= Amenia Township, North Dakota =

Township in North Dakota, US

- Township
- Location of Amenia Township within Cass County

- Location within North Dakota
- Coordinates: 47°01′15″N 97°15′37″W
- Country: United States
- State: North Dakota
- County: Cass

Area
  - Total: 34.57 sq mi (89.54 km^{2})
  - Land: 34.56 sq mi (89.52 km^{2})
  - Water: 0.0081 sq mi (0.021 km^{2})
- Elevation: 978 ft (298 m)

Population (2020)
  - Total: 90
  - Density: 2.6/sq mi (1.0/km^{2})
- Time zone: UTC-6 (Central (CST))
  - Summer (DST): UTC-5 (CDT)
- ZIP codes: 58004 (Amenia); 58006 (Arthur); 58012 (Casselton); 58079 (Wheatland)
- Area code: 701
- FIPS code: 38-01980
- GNIS feature ID: 1036385

Amenia Township is a township in Cass County, North Dakota, United States. It has a population of 90 as of the 2020 census.

The city of Amenia is entirely surrounded by the township.

== Geography ==
Amenia Township has a total area of 34.570 square miles (89.54 km^{2}), of which 34.562 square miles (89.52 km^{2}) is land and 0.008 square miles (0.021 km^{2}) is water.

=== Major highways ===
- North Dakota Highway 18

=== Adjacent townships ===
- Arthur Township (north)
- Gunkel Township (northeast)
- Rush River Township (east)
- Harmony Township (southeast)
- Casselton Township (south)
- Wheatland Township (southwest)
- Empire Township (west)
- Erie Township (northwest)

== Demographics ==
Historical population
Census	Pop.	Note	%±
1890	280		—
1900	381		36.1%
1910	443		16.3%
1920	382		−13.8%
1930	338		−11.5%
1940	322		−4.7%
1950	256		−20.5%
1960	182		−28.9%
1970	164		−9.9%
1980	135		−17.7%
1990	132		−2.2%
2000	112		−15.2%
2010	105		−6.2%
2020	90		−14.3%

As of the 2024 American Community Survey, there were an estimated 48 households, with a margin of error of 32.
