= Addison Township, North Dakota =

Township in North Dakota, US

- Township
- Location of Addison Township within Cass County

- Location within North Dakota
- Coordinates: 46°45′50″N 97°7′17″W
- Country: United States
- State: North Dakota
- County: Cass
- Named after: Addison Leach

Government
  - Clerk/Treasurer: Jon Erickson
  - Chairman: Dallas Glasow

Area
  - Total: 35.97 sq mi (93.17 km^{2})
  - Land: 35.97 sq mi (93.17 km^{2})
  - Water: 0 sq mi (0.00 km^{2})
- Elevation: 922 ft (281 m)

Population (2020)
  - Total: 99
  - Density: 2.8/sq mi (1.1/km^{2})
- Time zone: UTC-6 (Central (CST))
  - Summer (DST): UTC-5 (CDT)
- ZIP codes: 58021 (Davenport); 58059 (Mapleton)
- Area code: 701
- FIPS code: 38-00500
- GNIS feature ID: 1036362

Addison Township is a township in Cass County, North Dakota, United States. It has a population of 99 as of the 2020 census.

== History ==
Addison Township was named after landowner Addison Leach.

== Geography ==
Addison Township has a total area of 35.973 square miles (93.17 km^{2}), all land.

Despite officially having no water area according to the United States Census Bureau, Maple River runs through the western portion of the township.

=== Adjacent townships ===
- Durbin Township (north)
- Mapleton Township (northeast)
- Warren Township (east)
- Normanna Township (southeast)
- Davenport Township (south)
- Leonard Township (southwest)
- Maple River Township (west)
- Everest Township (northwest)

=== Churches ===
The township contains one church: Canaan Moravian Church.

== Demographics ==
As of the 2024 American Community Survey, there are an estimated 13 households.

Historical population
Census	Pop.	Note	%±
1890	272		—
1900	359		32.0%
1910	355		−1.1%
1920	236		−33.5%
1930	291		23.3%
1940	256		−12.0%
1950	215		−16.0%
1960	163		−24.2%
1970	113		−30.7%
1980	103		−8.8%
1990	95		−7.8%
2000	104		9.5%
2010	91		−12.5%
2020	99		8.8%
U.S. Decennial Census; 2020 Census
