= County roads in Cass County, North Dakota =

- Standard county road marker

Highway names
- Interstates: Interstate X (I-X)
- US Highways: U.S. Highway X (US X)
- State: State Highway X (ND X)
- County Roads: County Road X (CR X)

System links
- North Dakota State Highway System; Interstate; US; State

The following is a list of county-maintained roads in Cass County, North Dakota, United States.

== Route list ==
Number	Length (mi)	Length (km)	Southern or western terminus	Northern or eastern terminus	Local names	Formed	Removed	Notes
CR 1	—	—	Hill-Clifton township line	Cass-Steele county line in Rochester Township	133rd Avenue SE	—	—	
CR 2	—	—	Cass-Barnes county line in Rochester Township	ND 38 in Rochester Township	14th Street SE	—	—	1st segment
CR 2	—	—	CR 5 in Dows Township	CR 81 in Kinyon Township	15th Street SE	—	—	2nd segment
CR 2	—	—	CR 81 in Kinyon Township	CR 31 in Noble Township	14th Street SE	—	—	3rd segment
CR 3	—	—	I-94/US 52 in Howes Township	CR 26 at Rich-Page township line	142nd Avenue SE	—	—	Southern segment
CR 3	—	—	CR 26 at Rich-Page township line	Cass-Steele county line in Page Township	140th Avenue SE	—	—	Northern segment
CR 4	—	—	Cass-Barnes county line in Cornell Township	CR 31 in Harwood Township	25th Street SE	—	—	
CR 5	—	—	ND 46 at Cass-Ransom county line in Watson Township	CR 4 in Empire Township	149th Avenue SE, 34th Street SE, 148th Avenue SE	—	—	1st segment
CR 5	—	—	CR 4 in Empire Township	CR 26 at Erie-Dows township line	147th Avenue SE	—	—	2nd segment
CR 5	—	—	CR 26 at Erie-Dows township line	Cass-Traill county line in Dows Township	147th Avenue SE	—	—	3rd segment
CR 6	—	—	Cass-Barnes county line in Clifton Township	CR 38 in Alice	45th Street SE	—	—	1st segment
CR 6	—	—	CR 38 at Clifton-Eldred township line	CR 17 in Horace	44th Street SE, 76th Avenue S	—	—	2nd segment
CR 6	—	—	CR 17 at Horace-West Fargo city line	45th Street S in Fargo	52nd Avenue S	—	—	3rd segment
CR 7	—	—	ND 46 at Cass-Ransom county line on Highland-Watson township line	I-94/US 52 on Howes-Gill township line	145th Avenue SE	—	—	
CR 8	—	—	CR 15 in Mapleton Township	West Fargo city limits	41st Street SE	—	—	
CR 9	—	—	ND 46 at Cass-Richland county line on Leonard-Davenport township line	CR 16 at Leonard-Davenport-Addison-Maple River township lines	157th Avenue SE	—	—	1st segment
CR 9	—	—	CR 16 at Davenport-Addison township line	CR 6 in Addison Township	159th Avenue SE	—	—	2nd segment
CR 9	—	—	CR 6 in Addison Township	ND 10 in Durbin Township	158th Avenue SE	—	—	3rd segment
CR 10	—	—	Cass-Barnes county line in Tower City	ND 38 in Buffalo	Maiden Lane, 34th Street SE	—	—	1st segment
CR 10	—	—	ND 38 in Buffalo	ND 18 in Casselton	Main Street, 34th Street SE, 149th Avenue SE, 35th Street SE	—	—	2nd segment
CR 10	—	—	ND 18 in Casselton	CR 11 in Mapleton	5th Street N, 35th Street SE	—	—	3rd segment
CR 10	—	—	CR 11 in Mapleton	CR 11 in Mapleton	163rd Avenue SE, Meridian Road	—	—	4th segment
CR 10	—	—	CR 11 in Mapleton	West Fargo city limits	36th Street SE	—	—	5th segment
CR 11	—	—	I-94/US 52 in Mapleton	I-29/US 81 in Grandin	Meridian Road, 163rd Avenue SE, 12th Street SE	—	—	
CR 12	—	—	Cass-Barnes county line in Hill Township	CR 38 at Hill-Howes township line	41st Street SE	—	—	
CR 13	—	—	CR 20 in Raymond Township	CR 22 in Raymond Township	166th Avenue SE	—	—	
CR 14	—	—	CR 15 in Warren Township	CR 81 in Stanley Township	46th Street SE, 100th Avenue S	—	—	
CR 15	—	—	ND 46 in Kindred	CR 10 at Mapleton-Raymond township line	165th Avenue SE, 1st Avenue S, 1st Avenue N	—	—	
CR 16	—	—	Cass-Barnes county line in Pontiac Township	CR 7 at Highland-Watson township line	49th Street SE	—	—	1st segment
CR 16	—	—	CR 7 at Highland-Watson township line	CR 5 in Watson Township	50th Street SE	—	—	2nd segment
CR 16	—	—	CR 5 in Watson Township	CR 81 at Stanley-Pleasant township line	49th Street SE, 152nd Avenue SE, 48th Street SE, 124th Avenue S	—	—	3rd segment
CR 16	—	—	CR 81 at Stanley-Pleasant township line	CR 81 in Stanley Township	175th Avenue SE	—	—	4th segment
CR 16	—	—	CR 81 in Stanley Township	North Dakota-Minnesota state line in Stanley Township	112th Avenue S	—	—	5th segment
CR 17	—	—	ND 46 at Cass-Richland county line in Pleasant Township	CR 6 at Horace-West Fargo city line	170th Avenue SE, Main Street	—	—	Southern segment
CR 17	—	—	12th Avenue N in West Fargo	I-29/US 81 in Harwood	69th Street N, Dakota Avenue	—	—	Northern segment
CR 18	—	—	CR 17 in Pleasant Township	North Dakota-Minnesota state line in Pleasant Township	52nd Street SE	—	—	
CR 20	—	—	CR 11 at Harmony-Raymond township line	I-29/US 81 in Fargo	33rd Street SE, 40th Avenue N	—	—	
CR 21	—	—	CR 16 at Stanley-Pleasant township line	CR 14 in Stanley Township	173rd Avenue SE	—	—	
CR 22	—	—	CR 11 at Harmony-Raymond township line	CR 17 in Reed Township	31st Street SE	—	—	Western segment
CR 22	—	—	CR 17 in Reed Township	North Dakota-Minnesota state line at Reed-Harwood township line	69th Street N, Dakota Avenue, 76th Avenue N	—	—	Eastern segment
CR 23	—	—	I-94/US 52 in Everest Township	CR 10 in Casselton Township	153rd Avenue SE	—	—	
CR 26	—	—	Cass-Barnes county line at Lake-Rochester township line	CR 31 at Harwood-Noble township line	18th Street SE	—	—	1st segment; Former ND 26
CR 26	—	—	CR 31 at Harwood-Noble township line	CR 31 in Noble Township	173rd Avenue SE	—	—	2nd segment; Former ND 26
CR 26	—	—	CR 31 in Noble Township	North Dakota-Minnesota state line in Noble Township	16th Street SE	—	—	3rd segment; Former ND 26
CR 27	—	—	ND 46 at Cass-Richland county line in Davenport Township	CR 16 in Davenport	162nd Avenue SE, 1st Avenue, Main Street	—	—	
CR 28	—	—	West Fargo city limits	Main Avenue in Mapleton Township	13th Avenue W, 15th Street NW	—	—	
CR 31	—	—	40th Avenue N in Fargo	CR 22 at Reed-Harwood township line	16th Street N	—	—	Southern segment
CR 31	—	—	CR 22 at Reed-Harwood township line	Cass-Traill county line in Noble Township	173rd Avenue SE	—	—	Northern segment
CR 32	—	—	CR 1 at Tower-Cornell township line	CR 5 at Wheatland-Empire township line	30th Street SE	—	—	Western segment
CR 32	—	—	CR 5 in Empire Township	CR 81 in Harwood Township	28th Street SE	—	—	Western segment
CR 34	—	—	CR 5 in Erie Township	CR 81 in Gardner Township	21st Street SE	—	—	1st segment
CR 34	—	—	CR 81 in Gardner Township	CR 81 in Gardner Township		—	—	2nd segment
CR 34	—	—	CR 81 in Gardner Township	North Dakota-Minnesota state line in Wiser Township	22nd Street SE	—	—	3rd segment
CR 36	—	—	ND 18 in Leonard Township	167th Avenue SE in Normanna Township	51st Street SE	—	—	
CR 38	—	—	ND 46 at Cass-Ransom county line on Pontiac-Highland township line	I-94/US 52 at Hill-Howes township line	139th Avenue SE	—	—	
CR 81	—	—	ND 46 at Cass-Richland county line in Pleasant Township	Fargo city limits	174th Avenue SE, 175th Avenue SE	—	—	Southern segment; Former US 81
CR 81	—	—	40th Avenue N in Reed Township	Cass-Traill county line in Grandin	Truman Drive, 167th Avenue SE	—	—	Northern segment; Former US 81
