= Ayr Township, North Dakota =

Township in North Dakota, US

- Township
- Location of Ayr Township within Cass County

- Location within North Dakota
- Coordinates: 47°01′18″N 97°30′55″W
- Country: United States
- State: North Dakota
- County: Cass

Area
  - Total: 36.02 sq mi (93.29 km^{2})
  - Land: 36.02 sq mi (93.29 km^{2})
  - Water: 0 sq mi (0.00 km^{2})
- Elevation: 1,201 ft (366 m)

Population (2020)
  - Total: 65
  - Density: 1.8/sq mi (0.70/km^{2})
- Time zone: UTC-6 (Central (CST))
  - Summer (DST): UTC-5 (CDT)
- ZIP codes: 58007 (Ayr); 58011 (Buffalo); 56064 (Page)
- Area code: 701
- FIPS code: 38-04060
- GNIS feature ID: 1036389

Ayr Township is a township in Cass County, North Dakota, United States. The population was 65 at the 2020 census.

The city of Ayr is entirely surrounded by the township.

== Geography ==
Ayr Township has a total area of 36.020 square miles (93.29 km^{2}), all land.

=== Major highways ===
- North Dakota Highway 38
