= Rich Township =

Rich Township may refer to:

- Rich Township, Cook County, Illinois
- Rich Township, Anderson County, Kansas
- Rich Township, Lapeer County, Michigan
- Rich Township, Cass County, North Dakota, in Cass County, North Dakota
