= Dows Township, North Dakota =

Township in North Dakota, US

- Township
- Location of Dows Township within Cass County

- Location within North Dakota
- Coordinates: 47°11′44″N 97°23′16″W
- Country: United States
- State: North Dakota
- County: Cass

Area
  - Total: 36.01 sq mi (93.27 km^{2})
  - Land: 36.01 sq mi (93.27 km^{2})
  - Water: 0.00 sq mi (0 km^{2})
- Elevation: 1,096 ft (334 m)

Population (2020)
  - Total: 28
  - Density: 0.78/sq mi (0.30/km^{2})
- Time zone: UTC-6 (Central (CST))
  - Summer (DST): UTC-5 (CDT)
- ZIP codes: 58029 (Erie); 58035 (Galesburg); 58048 (Hunter)
- Area code: 701
- FIPS code: 38-20220
- GNIS feature ID: 1036397

Dows Township is a township in Cass County, North Dakota, United States. The population was 28 at the 2020 census, down from 43 in 2010.

== History ==
A former settlement and GNRR station called Mortimer was built in Dows Township between 1914 and 1915. Mortimer had a population of roughly 11 before the station was destroyed in 1940.

== Geography ==
Dows Township has a total area of 36.011 square miles (93.27 km^{2}), all land.

== Demographics ==
As of the 2024 American Community Survey, there were an estimated 2 households.
