= Page Township =

Page Township may refer to:

- Page Township, Mille Lacs County, Minnesota
- Page Township, Cass County, North Dakota, Cass County, North Dakota
