= Durbin, North Dakota =

Community in North Dakota, US

- Unincorporated community
- Location within North Dakota
- Coordinates: 46°48′31″N 97°08′58″W
- Country: United States
- State: North Dakota
- County: Cass
- Township: Durbin
- Elevation: 922 ft (281 m)
- Time zone: UTC-6 (Central (CST))
  - Summer (DST): UTC-5 (CDT)
- Area code: 701
- GNIS feature ID: 1028752

Durbin is an unincorporated community in Cass County, in the U.S. state of North Dakota.

== Geography ==
Durbin is 19 miles (31 km) from Fargo, the county seat.

== History ==
Durbin was founded in 1881, and was given the name of a railroad worker. A post office was established at Durbin in 1881.

Durbin was platted by C.W. Redmore. The population was estimated to be 100 in 1890. The population was 22 in 1940.

The Durbin post office closed on July 12, 1985. Its ZIP Code had been 58023.

== See also ==
- Norman, North Dakota
