= Rochester Township, Cass County, North Dakota =

Township in North Dakota, US

Rochester Township, North Dakota
- Township
- Location of Rochester Township within Cass County.

- Location within North Dakota
- Coordinates: 47°11′45″N 97°38′32″W
- Country: United States
- State: North Dakota
- County: Cass
- Named for: Rochester, England

Government
  - Clerk-Treasurer: Marvin Thorson
  - Chairman: Mike Whitmore

Area
  - Total: 36.03 sq mi (93.32 km^{2})
  - Land: 36.03 sq mi (93.32 km^{2})
  - Water: 0 sq mi (0.00 km^{2})
- Elevation: 1,165 ft (355 m)

Population (2020)
  - Total: 49
  - Density: 1.4/sq mi (0.53/km^{2})
- Time zone: UTC-6 (Central (CST))
  - Summer (DST): UTC-5 (CDT)
- ZIP codes: 58046 (Hope); 58064 (Page)
- Area code: 701
- FIPS code: 38-67260
- GNIS feature ID: 1036399

Rochester Township is the northwestern-most township of Cass County, North Dakota, United States. The population was 49 at the 2020 census, down from 53 in 2010.

== History ==
Rochester Township was named after the port town of Rochester in Kent, England.

A former GNRR loading station called Walden was located in Rochester Township. It was supposedly named after Walden Pond in Massachusetts.

== Geography ==
Rochester Township has a total of 36.030 square miles (93.32 km^{2}), all land.

=== Major highways ===
- North Dakota Highway 38

== Demographics ==
As of the 2024 American Community Survey, there are an estimated 20 households.
