= Gardner Township =

Gardner Township may refer to:

- Gardner Township, Sangamon County, Illinois
- Gardner Township, Johnson County, Kansas
- Gardner Township, Buffalo County, Nebraska
- Gardner Township, North Dakota
