= Tower Township, Cass County, North Dakota =

Township in North Dakota, US

Tower Township, North Dakota
- Township
- Location within North Dakota
- Coordinates: 46°56′03″N 97°37′09″W
- Country: United States
- State: North Dakota
- County: Cass

Area
  - Total: 34.59 sq mi (89.58 km^{2})
  - Land: 34.58 sq mi (89.57 km^{2})
  - Water: 0.0039 sq mi (0.01 km^{2})
- Elevation: 1,155 ft (352 m)

Population (2020)
  - Total: 123
  - Density: 3.56/sq mi (1.37/km^{2})
- Time zone: UTC-6 (Central (CST))
  - Summer (DST): UTC-5 (CDT)
- ZIP codes: 58011 (Buffalo); 58071 (Tower City)
- Area code: 701
- FIPS code: 38-75340
- GNIS feature ID: 1036378

Tower Township is a township in Cass County, North Dakota, United States. The population was 123 at the 2020 census.

== Geography ==
Tower Township has a total area of 34.59 square miles (89.6 km^{2}), of which 34.58 square miles (89.6 km^{2}) is land and 0.003 square miles (0.0078 km^{2}) is water.

The township surrounds the entire eastern portion of Tower City.

=== Major highways ===
- Interstate 94
- North Dakota Highway 38

== Demographics ==
As of the 2023 American Community Survey, there were an estimated 18 households.
