= Hunter Township, Cass County, North Dakota =

Township in North Dakota, US

Hunter Township, North Dakota
- Township
- Location of Hunter Township within Cass County

- Location within North Dakota
- Coordinates: 47°11′43″N 97°15′40″W
- Country: United States
- State: North Dakota
- County: Cass

Area
  - Total: 34.41 sq mi (89.1 km^{2})
  - Land: 34.35 sq mi (89.0 km^{2})
  - Water: 0.07 sq mi (0.18 km^{2})
- Elevation: 1,007 ft (307 m)

Population (2020)
  - Total: 68
  - Density: 2.0/sq mi (0.76/km^{2})
- Time zone: UTC-6 (Central (CST))
  - Summer (DST): UTC-5 (CDT)
- ZIP codes: 58035 (Galesburg); 58048 (Hunter)
- Area code: 701
- FIPS code: 38-39500
- GNIS feature ID: 1036396

Hunter Township is a township in Cass County, North Dakota, United States. The population was 68 at the 2020 census.

It was named after the neighboring city of Hunter.

== Geography ==
Hunter Township has a total area of 34.41 square miles (89.1 km^{2}), of which 34.35 square miles (89.0 km^{2}) is land and 0.065 square miles (0.17 km^{2}) is water.

=== Major highways ===
- North Dakota Highway 18

== Demographics ==
As of the 2024 American Community Survey, Hunter Township had an estimated 28 households, with a margin of error of 18.
