= Arthur Township, North Dakota =

Township in North Dakota, US

- Township
- Location of Arthur Township within Cass County

- Location within North Dakota
- Coordinates: 47°06′29.1″N 97°15′39.5″W
- Country: United States
- State: North Dakota
- County: Ward
- Organized: 1880s

Government
  - Chairman: Chris Murch
  - Clerk-Treasurer: Dee De Geest

Area
  - Total: 34.52 sq mi (89.41 km^{2})
  - Land: 34.52 sq mi (89.41 km^{2})
  - Water: 0 sq mi (0.00 km^{2})
- Elevation: 1,020 ft (310 m)

Population (2020)
  - Total: 61
  - Density: 1.8/sq mi (0.68/km^{2})
- Time zone: UTC-6 (Central (CST))
  - Summer (DST): UTC-5 (CDT)
- ZIP codes: 58006 (Arthur); 58029 (Erie); 58048 (Hunter)
- Area code: 701
- FIPS code: 38-03340
- GNIS feature ID: 1036386

Arthur Township is a civil township in Cass County, in the U.S. state of North Dakota. As of the 2020 census, it had a population of 61.

== History ==
Arthur Township was established in the 1880s.

== Geography ==
Arthur Township has a total area of 34.523 square miles (89.41 km^{2}), all land.

The city of Arthur is surrounded by the township.

=== Major highways ===
- North Dakota Highway 18

== Demographics ==
Historical population
Census	Pop.	Note	%±
1890	129		—
1900	269		108.5%
1910	380		41.3%
1920	447		17.6%
1930	272		−39.1%
1940	273		0.4%
1950	249		−8.8%
1960	209		−16.1%
1970	120		−42.6%
1980	103		−14.2%
1990	71		−31.1%
2000	82		15.5%
2010	78		−4.9%
2020	61		−21.8%

As of the 2024 American Community Survey, there were an estimated 23 households, with a margin of error of 18.
