= Kinyon Township, Cass County, North Dakota =

Township in North Dakota, US

Kinyon Township, North Dakota
- Township
- Location of Kinyon Township within Cass County

- Location within North Dakota
- Coordinates: 47°11′43″N 97°00′23″W
- Country: United States
- State: North Dakota
- County: Cass

Area
  - Total: 36.01 sq mi (93.27 km^{2})
  - Land: 36.01 sq mi (93.27 km^{2})
  - Water: 0 sq mi (0.00 km^{2})
- Elevation: 896 ft (273 m)

Population (2020)
  - Total: 113
  - Density: 3.14/sq mi (1.21/km^{2})
- Time zone: UTC-6 (Central (CST))
  - Summer (DST): UTC-5 (CDT)
- ZIP codes: 58036 (Gardner); 58038 (Grandin)
- Area code: 701
- FIPS code: 38-42980
- GNIS feature ID: 1036394

Kinyon Township is a township in Cass County, North Dakota, United States. The population was 113 at the 2020 census.

== Geography ==
Kinyon Township has a total area of 36.012 square miles (93.27 km^{2}), all land.

=== Major highways ===
- Interstate 29
- U.S. Highway 81
