= Bell Township, North Dakota =

Township in North Dakota, US

- Township
- Location of Bell Township within Cass County

- Location within North Dakota
- Coordinates: 47°11′43″N 97°08′03″W
- Country: United States
- State: North Dakota
- County: Cass

Government
  - Clerk-Treasurer: Jenna Kyser

Area
  - Total: 35.91 sq mi (93.0 km^{2})
  - Land: 35.91 sq mi (93.0 km^{2})
  - Water: 0.00 sq mi (0 km^{2})
- Elevation: 920 ft (280 m)

Population (2020)
  - Total: 44
  - Density: 1.2/sq mi (0.47/km^{2})
- Time zone: UTC-6 (Central (CST))
  - Summer (DST): UTC-5 (CDT)
- ZIP codes: 58038 (Grandin); 58048 (Hunter)
- Area code: 701
- FIPS code: 38-05900
- GNIS feature ID: 1036395

Bell Township is a township in Cass County, North Dakota, United States. The population was 44 at the 2020 census, up from 36 in 2010.

== Geography ==
Bell Township has a total area of 35.914 square miles (93.02 km^{2}), all land.

A portion of the South Branch Elm River runs through the township.

== Demographics ==
As of the 2024 American Community Survey, Bell Township had an estimated 16 households, with a margin of error of 11.
