= Noble Township, North Dakota =

Township in North Dakota, US

- Township
- Location of Noble Township within Cass County

- Location within North Dakota
- Coordinates: 47°11′40″N 96°53′14″W
- Country: United States
- State: North Dakota
- County: Cass
- Organized: April 15, 1884
- Named for: H. W. Noble

Area
  - Total: 31.40 sq mi (81.33 km^{2})
  - Land: 31.40 sq mi (81.33 km^{2})
  - Water: 0.00 sq mi (0 km^{2})
- Elevation: 876 ft (267 m)

Population (2020)
  - Total: 68
  - Density: 2.2/sq mi (0.84/km^{2})
- Time zone: UTC-6 (Central (CST))
  - Summer (DST): UTC-5 (CDT)
- ZIP codes: 58036 (Gardner); 58038 (Grandin)
- Area code: 701
- FIPS code: 38-57020
- GNIS feature ID: 1036393

Noble Township is a township in Cass County, North Dakota, United States. The population was 68 at the 2020 census.

== History ==
The township was named after H. W. Noble, a prominent local landowner who settled from Erie, Pennsylvania. It was officially organized on April 15, 1884.

A post office for a former settlement within the township, also called Noble, existed from 1882 to 1890. The settlement of Noble had a population of 41 in 1890.

== Geography ==
Noble Township has a total area of 31.403 square miles (81.33 km^{2}), all land.

== Demographics ==
As of the 2024 American Community Survey, there were an estimated 22 households with a margin of error of 14.
