= Barnes Township, North Dakota =

Township in North Dakota, US

- Township
- Location of Barnes Township (highlighted in red)

- Location within North Dakota
- Coordinates: 46°51′50″N 96°55′23″W
- Country: United States
- State: North Dakota
- County: Cass

Area
  - Total: 0.64 sq mi (1.65 km^{2})
  - Land: 0.62 sq mi (1.61 km^{2})
  - Water: 0.018 sq mi (0.047 km^{2})
- Elevation: 899 ft (274 m)

Population (2020)
  - Total: 36
  - Density: 58/sq mi (22/km^{2})
- Time zone: UTC-6 (Central (CST))
  - Summer (DST): UTC-5 (CDT)
- ZIP code: 58078 (West Fargo)
- Area code: 701
- FIPS code: 38-04900
- GNIS feature ID: 1036359

Barnes Township is a township in Cass County, North Dakota, United States. The population was 36 the 2020 census.

The Cass County Highway Department is located in Barnes Township.

== Geography ==
Barnes Township has a total area of 0.638 square miles (1.65 km^{2}), of which 0.620 square miles (1.61 km^{2}) is land and 0.018 square miles (0.047 km^{2}) is water.

=== Major highways ===
- Interstate 94
- U.S. Highway 52

=== Adjacent township ===
- Mapleton Township (west)
