= Norman, North Dakota =

Community in North Dakota, US

- Unincorporated community
- Location within North Dakota
- Coordinates: 46°39′32″N 96°56′36″W
- Country: United States
- State: North Dakota
- County: Cass
- Township: Normanna
- Elevation: 920 ft (280 m)
- Time zone: UTC-6 (Central (CST))
  - Summer (DST): UTC-5 (CDT)
- Area code: 701
- FIPS code: 57535
- GNIS feature ID: 1030432

Norman is an unincorporated community in Normanna Township, Cass County, North Dakota, United States.

== History ==
The area was first settled by white people in the 1870s. Cass County settler John Rustad built a store building south of the Sheyenne River. According to a county history, "When Mr. Rustad found that the town [of Kindred] could not be located at this point, he secured twelve yoke of oxen and transported the building to Norman, and then later to Kindred."

Norman grew up around the mill operated by Carl Norman. The post office was established on November 14, 1873. Soren Ottis was the postmaster.

Elling Ulness operated a store in Norman. The population was 12 in 1890. A stagecoach line connected Norman with Owego and Fargo.

The small community fell into decline; the Norman post office closed in 1900. Norman is still the site of the Norman Lutheran Church. This church was founded in 1872.

== Geography ==
It is 4 miles (6.4 km) east of Kindred.

== See also ==
- Hickson, North Dakota
