= Cornell Township, North Dakota =

Township in North Dakota, US

- Township
- Location within North Dakota
- Coordinates: 47°01′19″N 97°38′33″W
- Country: United States
- State: North Dakota
- County: Cass

Area
  - Total: 36.08 sq mi (93.44 km^{2})
  - Land: 36.08 sq mi (93.44 km^{2})
  - Water: 0 sq mi (0.00 km^{2})
- Elevation: 1,161 ft (354 m)

Population (2020)
  - Total: 42
  - Density: 1.2/sq mi (0.45/km^{2})
- Time zone: UTC-6 (Central (CST))
  - Summer (DST): UTC-5 (CDT)
- Area code: 701
- FIPS code: 38-16100
- GNIS feature ID: 1036391

Cornell Township is a township in Cass County, North Dakota, United States. The population was 42 at the 2020 census.

== Geography ==
Cornell Township has a total area of 36.08 square miles (93.4 km^{2}), all land.
