= Pontiac Township, North Dakota =

Township in North Dakota, US

- Township
- Location within North Dakota
- Coordinates: 46°40′24″N 97°37′10″W
- Country: United States
- State: North Dakota
- County: Cass

Area
  - Total: 35.9 sq mi (93.1 km^{2})
  - Land: 35.1 sq mi (91.0 km^{2})
  - Water: 0.81 sq mi (2.1 km^{2})
- Elevation: 1,150 ft (350 m)

Population (2020)
  - Total: 84
  - Density: 2.4/sq mi (0.92/km^{2})
- Time zone: UTC-6 (Central (CST))
  - Summer (DST): UTC-5 (CDT)
- Area code: 701
- FIPS code: 38-63580
- GNIS feature ID: 1036357

Pontiac Township is a township in Cass County, North Dakota, United States. The population was 84 at the 2020 census.

== Geography ==
Pontiac Township has a total area of 35.929 square miles (93.06 km^{2}), of which 35.133 square miles (90.99 km^{2}) is land and 0.796 square miles (2.06 km^{2}) is water.

== Demographics ==
As of the 2023 American Community Survey, there were an estimated 37 households.
