= Watson Township, North Dakota =

Township in North Dakota, US

- Township
- Location within North Dakota
- Coordinates: 46°40′23″N 97°22′02″W
- Country: United States
- State: North Dakota
- County: Cass

Area
  - Total: 36.0 sq mi (93.2 km^{2})
  - Land: 36.0 sq mi (93.2 km^{2})
  - Water: 0 sq mi (0.00 km^{2})
- Elevation: 1,047 ft (319 m)

Population (2020)
  - Total: 74
  - Density: 2.1/sq mi (0.79/km^{2})
- Time zone: UTC-6 (Central (CST))
  - Summer (DST): UTC-5 (CDT)
- Area code: 701
- FIPS code: 38-83940
- GNIS feature ID: 1036355

Watson Township is a township in Cass County, North Dakota, United States. The population was 74 at the 2020 census.

== Geography ==
Watson Township has a total area of 35.986 square miles (93.20 km^{2}), all land.

== Demographics ==
As of the 2023 American Community Survey, there were an estimated 0 households, down from an estimated 7 households in 2022.
