= Clifton Township, North Dakota =

Township in North Dakota, US

- Township
- Location within North Dakota
- Coordinates: 46°45′37″N 97°37′08″W
- Country: United States
- State: North Dakota
- County: Cass

Area
  - Total: 35.35 sq mi (91.55 km^{2})
  - Land: 35.12 sq mi (90.97 km^{2})
  - Water: 0.22 sq mi (0.57 km^{2})
- Elevation: 1,152 ft (351 m)

Population (2020)
  - Total: 89
  - Density: 2.5/sq mi (0.98/km^{2})
- Time zone: UTC-6 (Central (CST))
  - Summer (DST): UTC-5 (CDT)
- Area code: 701
- FIPS code: 38-14780
- GNIS feature ID: 1036370

Clifton Township is a township in Cass County, North Dakota, United States. The population was 89 at the 2020 census.

== Geography ==
Clifton Township has a total area of 35.35 square miles (91.6 km^{2}), of which 35.12 square miles (91.0 km^{2}) is land and 0.22 square miles (0.57 km^{2}) is water.
