= George Washington Cass =

American industrialist (1810–1888)

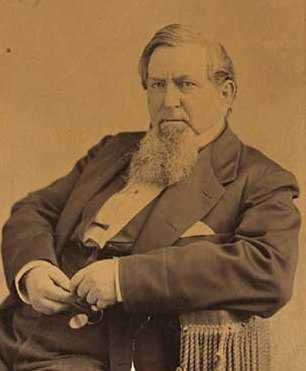
- Cass c. 1875

President of the Northern Pacific Railway
- In office 1872–1875
- Preceded by: J. Gregory Smith
- Succeeded by: Charles Barstow Wright

Personal details
- Born: March 12, 1810 near Dresden, Ohio, U.S.
- Died: March 21, 1888 (aged 78) New York City, U.S.
- Spouse: Louisa Dawson (m. 1842)
- Education: United States Military Academy
- Occupation: Industrialist

Military service
- Allegiance: United States
- Branch/service: United States Army (United States Army Corps of Engineers)

George Washington Cass (March 12, 1810 – March 21, 1888) was an American industrialist and president of the Northern Pacific Railway.

== Family ==
George Washington Cass was born near Dresden, Ohio, March 12, 1810, to George W. and Sophia (Lord) Cass. He married Louisa Dawson in 1842.

== Education ==
Cass attended Detroit Academy, 1824 to 1827, in Detroit, Michigan, while living with his uncle Lewis Cass, governor, Michigan Territory. He then graduated from U.S. Military Academy, West Point, New York, class of 1832.

== Career ==
Cass joined United States Army Corps of Engineers circa 1832, working on improvements to the Cumberland Road. Cass helped design Dunlap's Creek Bridge, the first cast iron arch bridge in the United States at Brownsville, Pennsylvania, later designated a National Historic Civil Engineering Landmark. Cass left the Army as a first lieutenant in 1836 and settled into private business in Brownsville, Pennsylvania.

From 1836 to 1855 Cass organized steamboat and stagecoach lines. Due to his efforts, he was appointed president of Adams & Co., predecessor to Adams Express. He expanded the Boston-based shipping company to points as far away as St. Louis, Missouri, and Richmond, Virginia.

From Adams, Cass went into railroading, becoming president of the Ohio and Pennsylvania Railroad in 1856, and the successor Pittsburgh, Fort Wayne and Chicago Railroad (PFW&C) in 1857. He held the latter position until 1883. During this period the PFW&C became part of the Pennsylvania Railroad.

Cass joined the Northern Pacific Railway as a director in 1867, four years before the company laid its first rail near Carlton, Minnesota. He was appointed president in 1872, and saw the company through the difficult years following the failure of Jay Cooke and Company and the Panic of 1873. He remained as president until 1875, when the company succumbed to its first bankruptcy. Cass was named its receiver and remained until Frederick Billings reorganized the company circa 1878. He died March 21, 1888, in New York City.

== Legacy ==
Cass County, North Dakota was named after him, as was the city of Casselton, North Dakota.

== See also ==
- List of railroad executives

== Sources ==
- Thomas C. Cochran, Railroad Leaders, 1845-1890 (1953).
- Eugene V. Smalley, History of the Northern Pacific Railroad (1883), pp. 190–97.

Preceded by John Gregory Smith	President of Northern Pacific Railway; 1872 – 1875	Succeeded by Charles Barstow Wright
