= Reile's Acres, North Dakota =

- City
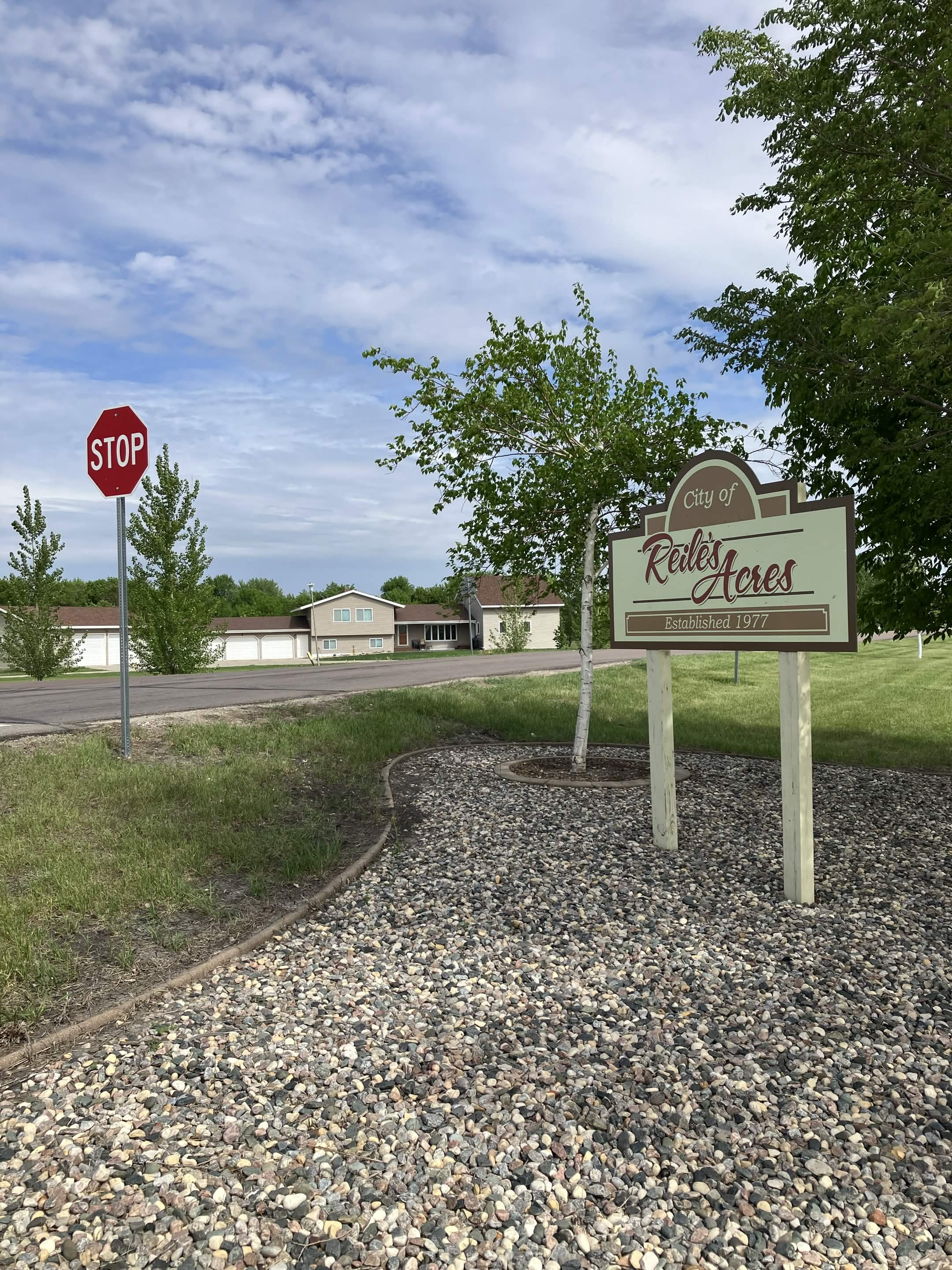

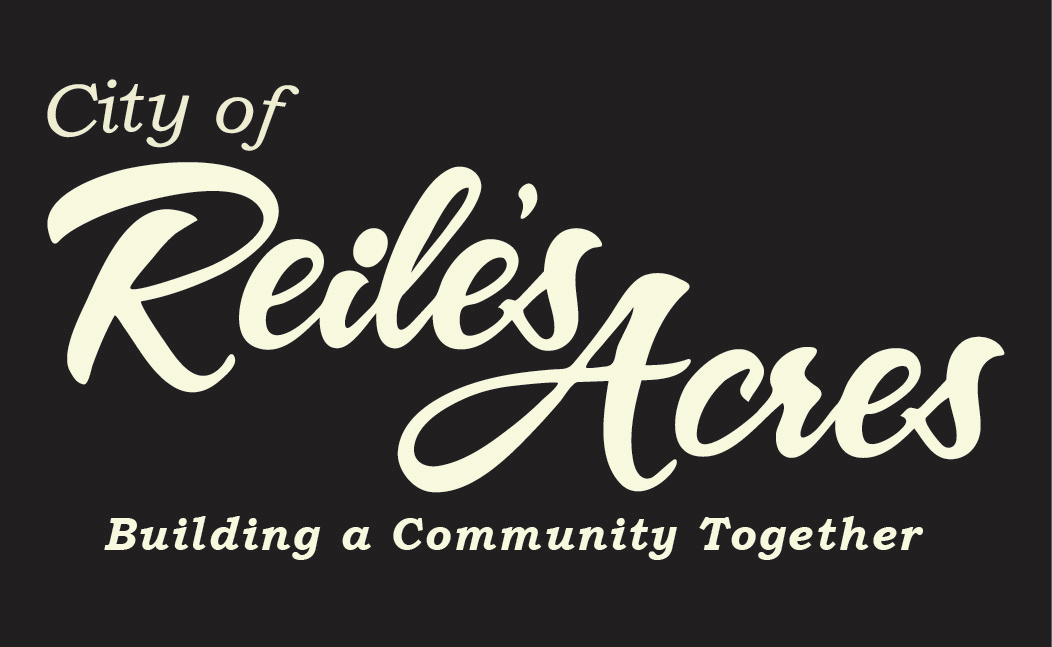
- Logo
- Motto: "Building a Community Together"
- Location of Reile's Acres, North Dakota
- Coordinates: 46.929064°N 96.870046°W
- Country: United States
- State: North Dakota
- County: Cass
- Founded: 1977
- Incorporated: February 22, 1977

Government
  - Mayor: Shane Amundson

Area
  - Total: 1.135 sq mi (2.939 km^{2})
  - Land: 1.135 sq mi (2.939 km^{2})
  - Water: 0 sq mi (0.000 km^{2}) 0.00%
- Elevation: 892 ft (272 m)

Population (2020)
  - Total: 703
  - Estimate (2024): 866
  - Density: 763.0/sq mi (294.59/km^{2})
- Time zone: UTC–6 (Central (CST))
  - Summer (DST): UTC–5 (CDT)
- ZIP Code: 58102
- Area code: 701
- FIPS code: 38-66040
- GNIS feature ID: 1036235
- Sales tax: 5.5%
- Website: reilesacresnd.org

Reile's Acres is a city in Cass County, North Dakota, United States. The population was 703 at the 2020 census, and was estimated to be 866 in 2024, It is a suburb of Fargo. Reile's Acres was founded in 1977.

== History ==
On February 22, 1977, at 9:30, Reile's Acres was incorporated as a city by order of the Cass County ND Commission with a population of 147. In 1976, just before the incorporation, the new city had 31 homes with a total value of $164,248.00 or an average value of roughly $5,300.00 per home. Reile's Acres is named for Reinhold Reile who originally owned the land and had a farmstead on the site. Therefore, the city is properly referred to with the apostrophe in Reile's. The move toward incorporation came about when the development of Reile's Acres reached a point where the Reed Township Board could not handle the costs of road maintenance. Residents of the Reile's Acres area said that through incorporation, state and federal funds as well as tax money would be available to take care of those needs.

On April 26, 1977, Reile's Acres held its very first election, at the Clark Zick residence. A total of 52 of the 82 eligible voters participating in the election chose Jim Lutz mayor, with 37 votes, the city chose four council members that night as well. Clarence Paschke, Susan Cleary, Millie Tareski and David Domier were the city's choices for four and two year terms.

== Geography ==
According to the United States Census Bureau, the city has a total area of 1.135 square miles (2.94 km^{2}), all land.

== Demographics ==
Historical population
Census	Pop.	Note	%±
1980	191		—
1990	210		9.9%
2000	254		21.0%
2010	513		102.0%
2020	703		37.0%
2024 (est.)	866		23.2%
U.S. Decennial Census; 2020 Census

According to realtor website Zillow, the average price of a home as of May 31, 2025, in Reile's Acres is $578,395.

As of the 2023 American Community Survey, there are 256 estimated households in Reile's Acres with an average of 3.47 persons per household. The city has a median household income of $198,333. Approximately 1.0% of the city's population lives at or below the poverty line. Reile's Acres has an estimated 89.5% employment rate, with 55.0% of the population holding a bachelor's degree or higher and 98.0% holding a high school diploma.

The top five reported ancestries (people were allowed to report up to two ancestries, thus the figures will generally add to more than 100%) were English (97.5%), Spanish (0.0%), Indo-European (2.5%), Asian and Pacific Islander (0.0%), and Other (0.0%).

The median age in the city was 35.5 years.

Reile's Acres, North Dakota racial and ethnic composition Note: the US Census treats Hispanic/Latino as an ethnic category. This table excludes Latinos from the racial categories and assigns them to a separate category. Hispanics/Latinos may be of any race.
Race / ethnicity (NH = non-Hispanic)	Number	Percent
White alone (NH)	665	94.59%
Black or African American alone (NH)	0	0.00%
Native American or Alaska Native alone (NH)	2	0.28%
Asian alone (NH)	6	0.85%
Pacific Islander alone (NH)	0	0.00%
Other race alone (NH)	1	0.14%
Mixed race or multiracial (NH)	25	3.56%
Hispanic or Latino (any race)	4	0.57%
Total	703	100.00%

=== 2020 census ===
As of the 2020 census, there were 703 people, 220 households, 201 families residing in the city. The population density was 1,400.40 inhabitants per square mile (540.7/km^{2}). There were 225 housing units at an average density of 448.21 per square mile (173.1/km^{2}). The racial makeup of the city was 95.02% White, 0.00% African American, 0.28% Native American, 0.85% Asian, 0.00% Pacific Islander, 0.14% from some other races and 3.70% from two or more races. Hispanic or Latino people of any race were 0.57% of the population.

=== 2010 census ===
As of the 2010 census, there were 513 people, 146 households, and 137 families residing in the city. The population density was 1,068.8 inhabitants per square mile (412.7/km^{2}). There were 147 housing units at an average density of 306.3 per square mile (118.3/km^{2}). The racial makeup of the city was 98.44% White, 0.19% African American, 0.19% Native American, 0.78% Asian, 0.00% Pacific Islander, 0.19% from some other races and 0.19% from two or more races. Hispanic or Latino people of any race were 0.78% of the population.

There were 146 households, of which 61.0% had children under the age of 18 living with them, 92.5% were married couples living together, 0.7% had a female householder with no husband present, 0.7% had a male householder with no wife present, and 6.2% were non-families. 4.1% of all households were made up of individuals, and 0.7% had someone living alone who was 65 years of age or older. The average household size was 3.51 and the average family size was 3.64.

The median age in the city was 34 years. 37.8% of residents were under the age of 18; 4.1% were between the ages of 18 and 24; 33.3% were from 25 to 44; 22.2% were from 45 to 64; and 2.5% were 65 years of age or older. The gender makeup of the city was 49.9% male and 50.1% female.

=== 2000 census ===
As of the 2000 census, there were 254 people, 72 households, and 68 families residing in the city. The population density was 528.6 inhabitants per square mile (204.1/km^{2}). There were 72 housing units at an average density of 149.8 per square mile (57.8/km^{2}). The racial makeup of the city was 98.43% White, 0.00% African American, 0.79% Native American, 0.00% Asian, 0.00% Pacific Islander, 0.00% from some other races and 0.79% from two or more races. Hispanic or Latino people of any race were 0.00% of the population.

There were 72 households, out of which 62.5% had children under the age of 18 living with them, 88.9% were married couples living together, 4.2% had a female householder with no husband present, and 4.2% were non-families. 4.2% of all households were made up of individuals, and none had someone living alone who was 65 years of age or older. The average household size was 3.53 and the average family size was 3.59.

In the city, the population was spread out, with 37.8% under the age of 18, 6.7% from 18 to 24, 29.5% from 25 to 44, 24.4% from 45 to 64, and 1.6% who were 65 years of age or older. The median age was 33 years. For every 100 females, there were 95.4 males. For every 100 females age 18 and over, there were 92.7 males.

The median income for a household in the city was $67,708, and the median income for a family was $68,958. Males had a median income of $46,250 versus $28,750 for females. The per capita income for the city was $22,367. About 4.2% of families and 2.4% of the population were below the poverty line, including none of those under the age of eighteen and 100.0% of those 65 or over.

== Law and government ==
Reile's Acres uses the city commission style of government. Four commissioners and a mayor are elected at large. The current mayor is Shane Amundson. The commission meets monthly. One municipal judge is also elected at large.

Reile's Acres fire services are provided by nearby West Fargo through an agreement.

== Economy ==
Reile's Acres does not have any commercial enterprise within the city limits. Workers commute to the Fargo-Moorhead area or beyond.

== Recreation ==
Reile's Acres has three city parks, one located on 45th St and 39th Ave that hosts a large park and little league ball diamond, one off of 35th Avenue which provides playground equipment, picnic areas, tennis courts, an ice skating rink, a baseball diamond and other typical park amenities. The city park shelter contains the city office and typically serves as the home of city commission meetings. The other park is located off of Landview Road and contains playground equipment and a picnic area.

== Education ==
All K-12 children attend either the West Fargo Public Schools, the Fargo Public Schools or the Northern Cass School District.
