= Absaraka, North Dakota =

Community in North Dakota, US

- Unincorporated community
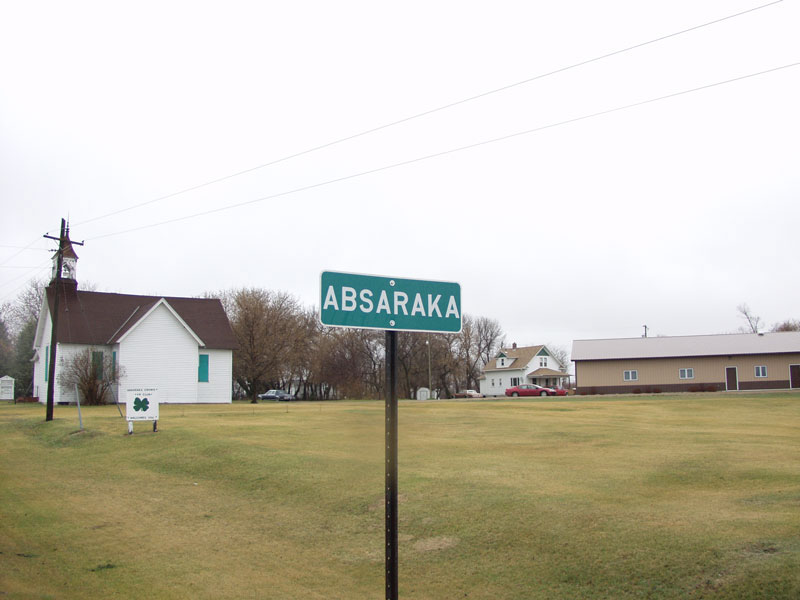
- Sign for Absaraka

- Location within North Dakota Location within the United States
- Coordinates: 46°58′41″N 97°23′40″W
- Country: United States
- State: North Dakota
- County: Cass
- Townships: Empire, Wheatland
- Elevation: 1,070 ft (330 m)
- Time zone: UTC-6 (Central (CST))
  - Summer (DST): UTC-5 (CDT)
- ZIP code: 58002
- Area code: 701
- GNIS feature ID: 1027648

Absaraka is an unincorporated community in central Cass County, North Dakota, United States. It lies northwest of the city of Fargo, the county seat of Cass County.

== History ==
The population was 48 in 1940.
