= Buffalo Township, North Dakota =

Township in North Dakota, US

- Township
- Location within North Dakota
- Coordinates: 46°56′01″N 97°29′35″W
- Country: United States
- State: North Dakota
- County: Cass

Area
  - Total: 35.7 sq mi (92 km^{2})
  - Land: 35.6 sq mi (92 km^{2})
  - Water: 0.1 sq mi (0.26 km^{2})
- Elevation: 1,158 ft (353 m)

Population (2020)
  - Total: 75
  - Density: 2.1/sq mi (0.81/km^{2})
- Time zone: UTC-6 (Central (CST))
  - Summer (DST): UTC-5 (CDT)
- Area code: 701
- GNIS feature ID: 1036377

Buffalo Township is a township in Cass County, North Dakota, United States. The population was 75 at the 2020 census.
