= Lake Township, North Dakota =

Township in North Dakota, US

- Township
- Location within North Dakota
- Coordinates: 47°06′32″N 97°38′32″W
- Country: United States
- State: North Dakota
- County: Cass

Area
  - Total: 36.02 sq mi (93.3 km^{2})
  - Land: 35.96 sq mi (93.1 km^{2})
  - Water: 0.05 sq mi (0.13 km^{2})
- Elevation: 1,155 ft (352 m)

Population (2020)
  - Total: 19
  - Density: 0.53/sq mi (0.20/km^{2})
- Time zone: UTC-6 (Central (CST))
  - Summer (DST): UTC-5 (CDT)
- Area code: 701
- FIPS code: 38-43780
- GNIS feature ID: 1036392

Lake Township is a township in Cass County, North Dakota, United States. The population was 19 at the 2020 census.

== Geography ==
Lake Township has a total area of 36.02 square miles (93.3 km^{2}), of which 35.96 square miles (93.1 km^{2}) is land and 0.05 square miles (0.13 km^{2}) is water.

== Demographics ==
As of the 2023 American Community Survey, there were an estimated 11 households.
