= Wheatland Township, Cass County, North Dakota =

Township in North Dakota, US

Wheatland Township, North Dakota
- Township
- Location within North Dakota
- Coordinates: 46°56′02″N 97°21′59″W
- Country: United States
- State: North Dakota
- County: Cass

Area
  - Total: 36.12 sq mi (93.6 km^{2})
  - Land: 36.11 sq mi (93.5 km^{2})
  - Water: 0.01 sq mi (0.026 km^{2})
- Elevation: 1,024 ft (312 m)

Population (2020)
  - Total: 182
  - Density: 5.04/sq mi (1.95/km^{2})
- Time zone: UTC-6 (Central (CST))
  - Summer (DST): UTC-5 (CDT)
- Area code: 701
- FIPS code: 38-85220
- GNIS feature ID: 1036376

Wheatland Township is a township in Cass County, North Dakota, United States. The population was 182 at the 2020 census.

The census-designated place of Wheatland is located in the township, as well as a portion of the unincorporated community of Absaraka.

== Geography ==
Wheatland Township has a total area of 36.12 square miles (93.6 km^{2}), of which 36.11 square miles (93.5 km^{2}) is land and 0.005 square miles (0.013 km^{2}) is water.

== Demographics ==
According to the 2010 census, there were 158 people living in Wheatland Township. The population density was 1.69/km^{2} (4.4/sq mi). The racial makeup of the township was 94.3% White, 1.9% African American, and 3.8% Native American. No residents were Hispanic or Latino of any race.
