= Amenia, North Dakota =

- City
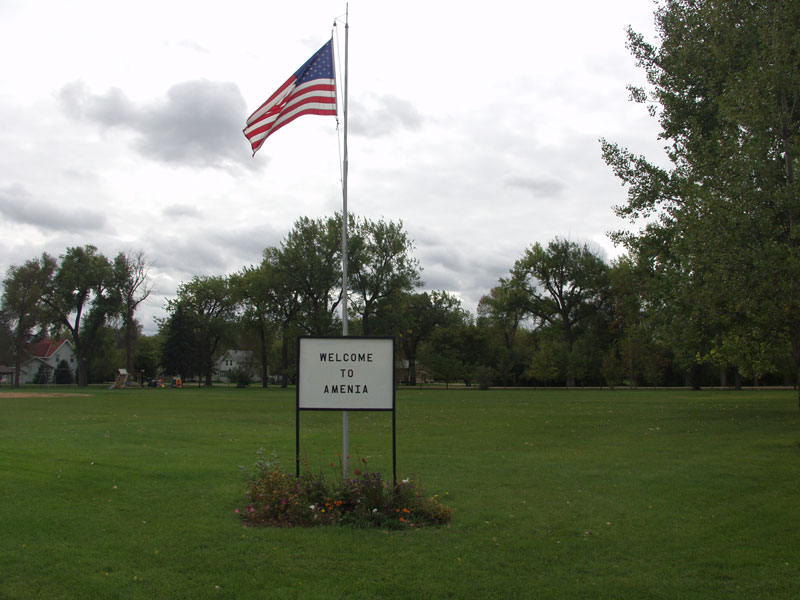
- Amenia, North Dakota
- Interactive map of Amenia, North Dakota
- Location within North Dakota
- Coordinates: 47.0065°N 97.2241°W
- Country: United States
- State: North Dakota
- County: Cass
- Founded: 1880
- Incorporated: 1927
- Named for: Amenia, New York

Government
  - Mayor: Tony Roth

Area
  - Total: 1.489 sq mi (3.857 km^{2})
  - Land: 1.489 sq mi (3.857 km^{2})
  - Water: 0 sq mi (0.000 km^{2}) 0.00%
- Elevation: 958 ft (292 m)

Population (2020)
  - Total: 85
  - Estimate (2025): 90
  - Density: 57/sq mi (22/km^{2})
- Time zone: UTC–6 (Central (CST))
  - Summer (DST): UTC–5 (CDT)
- ZIP Code: 58004
- Area code: 701
- FIPS code: 38-01940
- GNIS feature ID: 1035908
- Website: ameniand.com

Amenia (/əˈmiːniə/ ə-MEE-nee-ə) is a city in Cass County, North Dakota, United States. The population was 85 as of the 2020 census, and was estimated at 90 in 2025.

The town is the site of several transmitter towers of Fargo broadcast television and radio stations.

Amenia was the home of North Dakota governor William L. Guy before and after holding office.

== History ==
Amenia was founded in 1880. The town of Amenia traces its roots to a group of wealthy New England investors from the villages of Amenia, New York and Sharon, Connecticut which formed the Amenia and Sharon Land Company and, in July 1875, under the representation of Eben W. Chaffee, purchased 27,832 acres (11,263 ha) of land from the then bankrupt Northern Pacific Railroad. The stockholders' plan had been to develop the land enough to sell it to settlers, thus quickly realizing a return on the investors shares. However, taking notice of the success of the Cass-Cheney-Dalrymple bonanza farm near Casselton, and the exceptional fertility of the soil, Chaffee convinced the stockholders to hold the land and break the prairie sod for the production of wheat. The company built a depot and, in 1881, a grain elevator in order to move their product to market. Around them grew the village of Amenia. By the mid-1880s, the town had grown enough to require school services and to build a Congregational church. Chaffee was among its earliest residents and continued to be a central figure in the development of the town.

The city was officially incorporated in 1927.

== Geography ==
According to the United States Census Bureau, the city has a total area of 1.489 square miles (3.86 km^{2}), all land.

=== Climate ===
This climatic region is typified by large seasonal temperature differences, with warm to hot (and often humid) summers and cold (sometimes severely cold) winters. According to the Köppen Climate Classification system, Amenia has a humid continental climate, abbreviated "Dfb" on climate maps.

== Demographics ==
Historical population
Census	Pop.	Note	%±
1930	90		—
1940	104		15.6%
1950	127		22.1%
1960	117		−7.9%
1970	80		−31.6%
1980	93		16.3%
1990	82		−11.8%
2000	89		8.5%
2010	94		5.6%
2020	85		−9.6%
2025 (est.)	90		5.9%
U.S. Decennial Census; 2020 Census

=== 2020 census ===
As of the 2020 census, there were 85 people, 37 households, and 30 families residing in the city.

=== 2010 census ===
As of the 2010 census, there were 94 people, 34 households, and 31 families residing in the city. The population density was 65.7 inhabitants per square mile (25.4/km^{2}). There were 38 housing units at an average density of 26.6 per square mile (10.3/km^{2}). The racial makeup of the city was 92.6% White, 3.2% Native American, and 4.3% from two or more races.

There were 34 households, of which 38.2% had children under the age of 18 living with them, 88.2% were married couples living together, 2.9% had a male householder with no wife present, and 8.8% were non-families. 8.8% of all households were made up of individuals, and 5.8% had someone living alone who was 65 years of age or older. The average household size was 2.76 and the average family size was 2.90.

The median age in the city was 35.3 years. 26.6% of residents were under the age of 18; 8.5% were between the ages of 18 and 24; 29.7% were from 25 to 44; 26.6% were from 45 to 64; and 8.5% were 65 years of age or older. The gender makeup of the city was 48.9% male and 51.1% female.

=== 2000 census ===
As of the 2000 census, there were 89 people, 35 households, and 26 families residing in the city. The population density was 62.7 inhabitants per square mile (24.2/km^{2}). There were 35 housing units at an average density of 24.7 per square mile (9.5/km^{2}). The racial makeup of the city was 100.00% White.

There were 35 households, out of which 37.1% had children under the age of 18 living with them, 62.9% were married couples living together, 2.9% had a female householder with no husband present, and 25.7% were non-families. 25.7% of all households were made up of individuals, and 14.3% had someone living alone who was 65 years of age or older. The average household size was 2.54 and the average family size was 2.92.

In the city, the population was spread out, with 29.2% under the age of 18, 5.6% from 18 to 24, 23.6% from 25 to 44, 25.8% from 45 to 64, and 15.7% who were 65 years of age or older. The median age was 41 years. For every 100 females, there were 117.1 males. For every 100 females age 18 and over, there were 125.0 males.

The median income for a household in the city was $41,250, and the median income for a family was $51,250. Males had a median income of $31,250 versus $18,438 for females. The per capita income for the city was $16,462. There were no families and 2.3% of the population living below the poverty line, including no under eighteens and 15.4% of those over 64.
