= Gunkel Township, Cass County, North Dakota =

Township in North Dakota, US

Gunkel Township, North Dakota
- Township
- Location within North Dakota
- Coordinates: 47°06′30″N 97°08′01″W
- Country: United States
- State: North Dakota
- County: Cass

Area
  - Total: 36.19 sq mi (93.72 km^{2})
  - Land: 36.19 sq mi (93.72 km^{2})
  - Water: 0 sq mi (0.00 km^{2})
- Elevation: 938 ft (286 m)

Population (2020)
  - Total: 52
  - Density: 1.4/sq mi (0.55/km^{2})
- Time zone: UTC-6 (Central (CST))
  - Summer (DST): UTC-5 (CDT)
- Area code: 701
- FIPS code: 38-33820
- GNIS feature ID: 1036384

Gunkel Township is a township in Cass County, North Dakota, United States. The population was 52 at the 2020 census.

== Geography ==
Gunkel Township has a total area of 36.18 square miles (93.7 km^{2}), all land.

== Demographics ==
As of the 2023 American Community Survey, there were an estimated 28 households.
