= Leonard Township, North Dakota =

Township in North Dakota, US

- Township
- Location within North Dakota
- Coordinates: 46°40′22″N 97°14′29″W
- Country: United States
- State: North Dakota
- County: Cass

Area
  - Total: 35.22 sq mi (91.23 km^{2})
  - Land: 35.22 sq mi (91.23 km^{2})
  - Water: 0 sq mi (0.00 km^{2})
- Elevation: 988 ft (301 m)

Population (2020)
  - Total: 106
  - Density: 3.01/sq mi (1.16/km^{2})
- Time zone: UTC-6 (Central (CST))
  - Summer (DST): UTC-5 (CDT)
- Area code: 701
- FIPS code: 38-46020
- GNIS feature ID: 1036354

Leonard Township is a township in Cass County, North Dakota, United States. The population was 106 at the 2020 census. The city of Leonard is entirely surrounded by the township.

== Geography ==
Leonard Township has a total area of 35.223 square miles (91.23 km^{2}), all land.

== Demographics ==
As of the 2023 American Community Survey, there were an estimated 15 households.
