= Davenport Township, North Dakota =

Township in North Dakota, US

- Township
- Location within North Dakota
- Coordinates: 46°40′24″N 97°06′55″W
- Country: United States
- State: North Dakota
- County: Cass

Area
  - Total: 35.93 sq mi (93.05 km^{2})
  - Land: 35.93 sq mi (93.05 km^{2})
  - Water: 0 sq mi (0.00 km^{2})
- Elevation: 938 ft (286 m)

Population (2020)
  - Total: 184
  - Density: 5.12/sq mi (1.98/km^{2})
- Time zone: UTC-6 (Central (CST))
  - Summer (DST): UTC-5 (CDT)
- Area code: 701
- FIPS code: 38-18220
- GNIS feature ID: 1036353

Davenport Township is a township in Cass County, North Dakota, United States. The population was 184 at the 2020 census.

== Geography ==
Davenport Township has a total area of 35.93 square miles (93.05 square kilometers), all land.

== Demographics ==
As of the 2023 American Community Survey, there were an estimated 74 households.
