= Empire Township, North Dakota =

Township in North Dakota, US

- Township
- Location within North Dakota
- Coordinates: 47°01′17″N 97°23′19″W
- Country: United States
- State: North Dakota
- County: Cass

Area
  - Total: 35.94 sq mi (93.09 km^{2})
  - Land: 35.93 sq mi (93.05 km^{2})
  - Water: 0.015 sq mi (0.04 km^{2})
- Elevation: 1,073 ft (327 m)

Population (2020)
  - Total: 111
  - Density: 3.09/sq mi (1.19/km^{2})
- Time zone: UTC-6 (Central (CST))
  - Summer (DST): UTC-5 (CDT)
- Area code: 701
- FIPS code: 38-24140
- GNIS feature ID: 1036387

Empire Township is a township in Cass County, North Dakota, United States. The population was 111 at the 2020 census.

A portion of the unincorporated community of Absaraka lies within Empire Township.

== Geography ==
Empire Township has a total area of 35.94 square miles (93.1 km^{2}), of which 35.93 square miles (93.1 km^{2}) is land and 0.016 square miles (0.041 km^{2}) is water.

== Demographics ==
As of the 2023 American Community Survey, there were an estimated 45 households.
