= Harmony Township, North Dakota =

Township in North Dakota, US

- Township
- Location within North Dakota
- Coordinates: 46°56′05″N 97°06′58″W
- Country: United States
- State: North Dakota
- County: Cass

Area
  - Total: 34.53 sq mi (89.44 km^{2})
  - Land: 34.42 sq mi (89.16 km^{2})
  - Water: 0.11 sq mi (0.28 km^{2})
- Elevation: 920 ft (280 m)

Population (2020)
  - Total: 86
  - Density: 2.5/sq mi (0.96/km^{2})
- Time zone: UTC-6 (Central (CST))
  - Summer (DST): UTC-5 (CDT)
- Area code: 701
- FIPS code: 38-35580
- GNIS feature ID: 1036374

Harmony Township is a township in Cass County, North Dakota, United States. The population was 86 at the 2020 census.

== Geography ==
Harmony Township has a total area of 34.532 square miles (89.44 km^{2}), of which 34.425 square miles (89.16 km^{2}) is land and 0.107 square miles (0.28 km^{2}) is water.

== Demographics ==
As of the 2023 American Community Survey, there were an estimated 22 households.
