= Gardner Township, North Dakota =

Township in North Dakota, US

- Township
- Location within North Dakota
- Coordinates: 47°06′30″N 97°00′23″W
- Country: United States
- State: North Dakota
- County: Cass

Area
  - Total: 35.6 sq mi (92.2 km^{2})
  - Land: 35.6 sq mi (92.2 km^{2})
  - Water: 0 sq mi (0.00 km^{2})
- Elevation: 899 ft (274 m)

Population (2020)
  - Total: 131
  - Density: 3.68/sq mi (1.42/km^{2})
- Time zone: UTC-6 (Central (CST))
  - Summer (DST): UTC-5 (CDT)
- Area code: 701
- FIPS code: 38-29260
- GNIS feature ID: 2397799

Gardner Township is a township in Cass County, North Dakota, United States. The population was 131 at the 2020 census.

== Geography ==
Gardner Township has a total area of 35.596 square miles (92.19 km^{2}), all land.

=== Major highways ===
- Interstate 29
- U.S. Highway 81

== Demographics ==
As of the 2023 American Community Survey, there were an estimated 38 households.
