= Rich Township, Cass County, North Dakota =

Township in North Dakota, US

Rich Township, North Dakota
- Township
- Location within North Dakota
- Coordinates: 47°06′31″N 97°30′54″W
- Country: United States
- State: North Dakota
- County: Cass

Area
  - Total: 36.12 sq mi (93.6 km^{2})
  - Land: 36.08 sq mi (93.4 km^{2})
  - Water: 0.04 sq mi (0.10 km^{2})
- Elevation: 1,250 ft (381 m)

Population (2020)
  - Total: 72
  - Density: 2.0/sq mi (0.77/km^{2})
- Time zone: UTC-6 (Central (CST))
  - Summer (DST): UTC-5 (CDT)
- Area code: 701
- FIPS code: 38-66460
- GNIS feature ID: 1036390

Rich Township is a township in Cass County, North Dakota, United States. The population was 72 at the 2020 census.

== Geography ==
Rich Township has a total area of 36.12 square miles (93.6 km^{2}), of which 36.08 square miles (93.4 km^{2}) is land and 0.04 square miles (0.10 km^{2}) is water.

== Demographics ==
As of the 2023 American Community Survey, there were an estimated 26 households.
