= Warren Township, North Dakota =

Township in North Dakota, US

- Township
- Location within North Dakota
- Coordinates: 46°45′40″N 96°59′23″W
- Country: United States
- State: North Dakota
- County: Cass

Area
  - Total: 35.35 sq mi (91.55 km^{2})
  - Land: 35.35 sq mi (91.55 km^{2})
  - Water: 0.0039 sq mi (0.01 km^{2})
- Elevation: 912 ft (278 m)

Population (2020)
  - Total: 133
  - Density: 3.76/sq mi (1.45/km^{2})
- Time zone: UTC-6 (Central (CST))
  - Summer (DST): UTC-5 (CDT)
- Area code: 701
- FIPS code: 38-83500
- GNIS feature ID: 1036360

Warren Township is a township in Cass County, North Dakota, United States. The population was 133 at the 2020 census.

== Geography ==
Warren Township has a total area of 35.348 square miles (91.55 km^{2}), of which 35.346 square miles (91.55 km^{2}) is land and 0.002 square miles (0.0052 km^{2}) is water.

== Demographics ==
As of the 2023 American Community Survey, there were an estimated 60 households.
