= Ayr, North Dakota =

- City
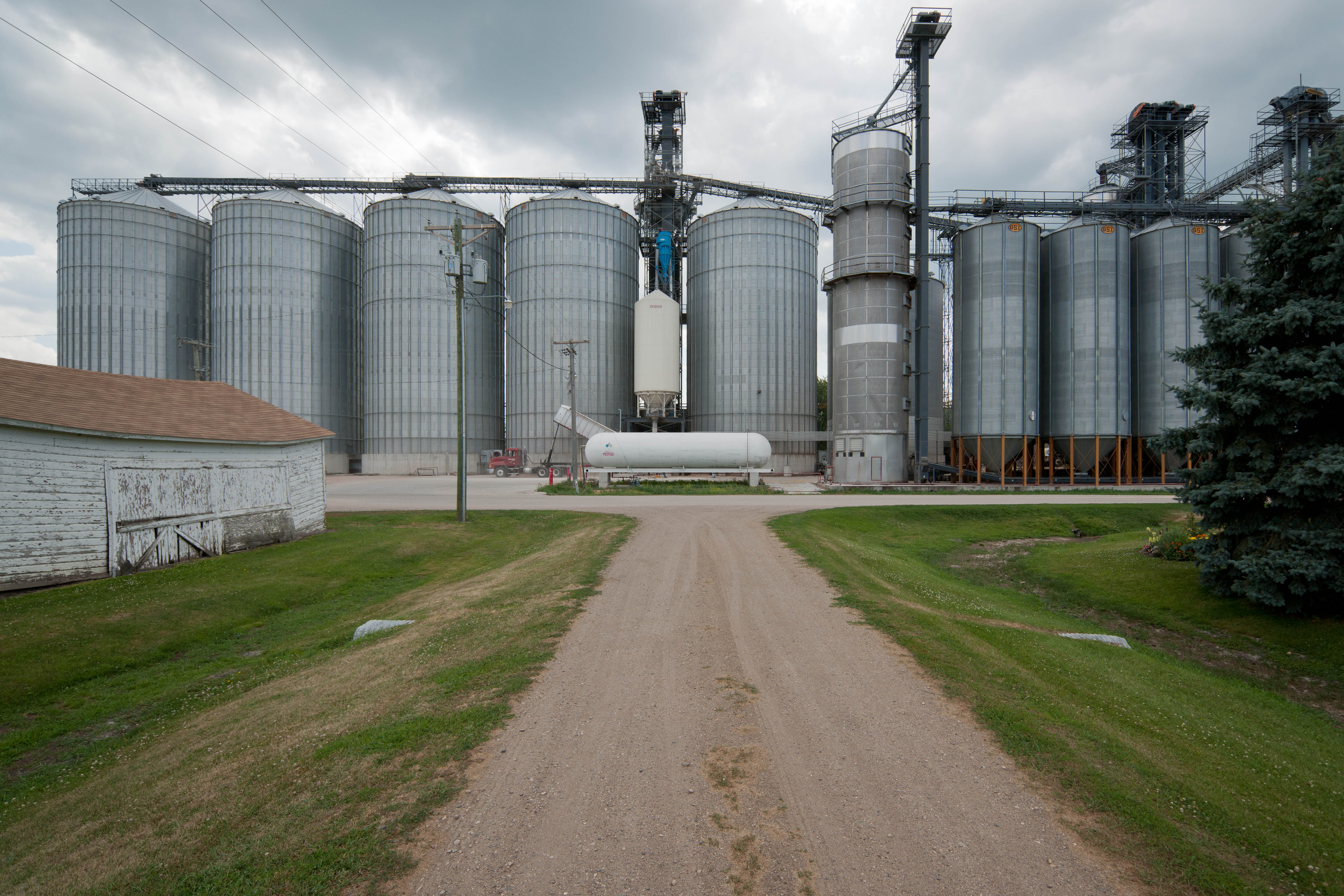
- Grain equipment in Ayr (July 2009)
- Interactive map of Ayr, North Dakota
- Location within North Dakota
- Coordinates: 47.0411°N 97.4909°W
- Country: United States
- State: North Dakota
- County: Cass
- First settled: 1879
- Founded: October 1883
- Incorporated: October 16, 1925

Government
  - Mayor: Terry Wills

Area
  - Total: 0.085 sq mi (0.219 km^{2})
  - Land: 0.085 sq mi (0.219 km^{2})
  - Water: 0 sq mi (0.000 km^{2}) 0.00%
- Elevation: 1,204 ft (367 m)

Population (2020)
  - Total: 11
  - Estimate (2025): 10
  - Density: 130/sq mi (50/km^{2})
- Time zone: UTC–6 (Central (CST))
  - Summer (DST): UTC–5 (CDT)
- ZIP Code: 58007
- Area code: 701
- FIPS code: 38-04020
- GNIS feature ID: 1035918

Ayr is a city in Cass County, North Dakota, United States. The population was 11 as of the 2020 census, and was estimated at 10 in 2025.

== History ==
The area was first settled in 1879 and called the area "The Park Farms". The settlers were from Scotland, specifically they came from Edinburgh and the town of Ayr.

The city, despite being settled earlier than that, was officially founded in October 1883, with the name of Dunlop.

The first permanent house in the area was built by Swedish who went by the name of "Mr. Pearson". Whilst, the first shop in the area was built in 1884 by a certain Dave Francis. The post office was established that same year, on January 7.

The town itself was renamed "Elgin" for a while, however from March 21, 1885 onwards, the town was named "Ayr" due to the presence of a town, which went by the same name, being present in a station of the Dakota territory. The choice for the new name was done by postmaster Frank Dickinson.

On October 16, 1925, the city was incorporated.

== Geography ==
According to the United States Census Bureau, the city has a total area of 0.085 square miles (0.22 km^{2}), all land.

== Demographics ==
Historical population
Census	Pop.	Note	%±
1930	106		—
1940	107		0.9%
1950	104		−2.8%
1960	81		−22.1%
1970	48		−40.7%
1980	42		−12.5%
1990	19		−54.8%
2000	23		21.1%
2010	17		−26.1%
2020	11		−35.3%
2025 (est.)	10		−9.1%
U.S. Decennial Census; 2020 Census

=== 2020 census ===
As of the 2020 census, there were 11 people, 0 households, and 0 families residing in the city.

=== 2010 census ===
As of the 2010 census, there were 17 people, 9 households, and 4 families living in the city. The population density was 212.5 inhabitants per square mile (82.0/km^{2}). There were 10 housing units at an average density of 125.0 per square mile (48.3/km^{2}). The racial makeup of the city was 100.00% White.

There were 9 households, of which 11.1% had children under the age of 18 living with them, 44.4% were married couples living together, and 55.6% were non-families. 55.6% of all households were made up of individuals, and 22.2% had someone living alone who was 65 years of age or older. The average household size was 1.89 and the average family size was 3.00.

The median age in the city was 56.3 years. 23.5% of residents were under the age of 18; 0.1% were between the ages of 18 and 24; 17.7% were from 25 to 44; 23.6% were from 45 to 64; and 35.3% were 65 years of age or older. The gender makeup of the city was 41.2% male and 58.8% female.

=== 2000 census ===
As of the 2000 census, there were 23 people, 11 households, and 7 families living in the city. The population density was 279.5 inhabitants per square mile (107.9/km^{2}). There were 13 housing units at an average density of 158.0 per square mile (61.0/km^{2}). The racial makeup of the city was 86.96% White, and 13.04% from two or more races.

There were 11 households, out of which 9.1% had children under the age of 18 living with them, 63.6% were married couples living together, and 27.3% were non-families. 27.3% of all households were made up of individuals, and 18.2% had someone living alone who was 65 years of age or older. The average household size was 2.09 and the average family size was 2.38.

In the city, the population was spread out, with 13.0% under the age of 18, 4.3% from 18 to 24, 21.7% from 25 to 44, 17.4% from 45 to 64, and 43.5% who were 65 years of age or older. The median age was 50 years. For every 100 females, there were 76.9 males. For every 100 females age 18 and over, there were 100.0 males.

The median income for a household in the city was $46,875, and the median income for a family was $139,068. Males had a median income of $33,750 versus $0 for females. The per capita income for the city was $55,567. None of the population and none of the families were below the poverty line.
