= Erie Township, North Dakota =

Township in North Dakota, US

- Township
- Location within North Dakota
- Coordinates: 47°06′29″N 97°23′16″W
- Country: United States
- State: North Dakota
- County: Cass

Area
  - Total: 36.03 sq mi (93.33 km^{2})
  - Land: 35.85 sq mi (92.86 km^{2})
  - Water: 0.18 sq mi (0.47 km^{2})
- Elevation: 1,109 ft (338 m)

Population (2020)
  - Total: 121
  - Density: 3.37/sq mi (1.30/km^{2})
- Time zone: UTC-6 (Central (CST))
  - Summer (DST): UTC-5 (CDT)
- Area code: 701
- FIPS code: 38-24660
- GNIS feature ID: 1036388

Erie Township is a township in Cass County, North Dakota, United States. The population was 121 at the 2020 census.

The census-designated place of Erie is located in Erie Township.

== Demographics ==
As of the 2023 American Community Survey, there were an estimated 22 households.
