= Page Township, Cass County, North Dakota =

Township in North Dakota, US

Page Township, North Dakota
- Township
- Location of Page Township within Cass County

- Location within North Dakota
- Coordinates: 47°11′43″N 97°30′53″W
- Country: United States
- State: North Dakota
- County: Cass

Area
  - Total: 35.02 sq mi (90.7 km^{2})
  - Land: 35.00 sq mi (90.6 km^{2})
  - Water: 0.02 sq mi (0.052 km^{2})
- Elevation: 1,188 ft (362 m)

Population (2020)
  - Total: 53
  - Density: 1.5/sq mi (0.58/km^{2})
- Time zone: UTC-6 (Central (CST))
  - Summer (DST): UTC-5 (CDT)
- ZIP codes: 58035 (Galesburg); 58064 (Page)
- Area code: 701
- FIPS code: 38-60540
- GNIS feature ID: 1036398

Page Township is a township in Cass County, North Dakota, United States. The population was 53 at the 2020 census.

== Geography ==
Page Township has a total area of 35.02 square miles (90.7 km^{2}), of which 35.00 square miles (90.6 km^{2}) is land and 0.02 square miles (0.052 km^{2}) (0.06%) is water.

== Demographics ==
As of the 2024 American Community Survey, there were an estimated 38 households.
