= Arthur, North Dakota =

- City
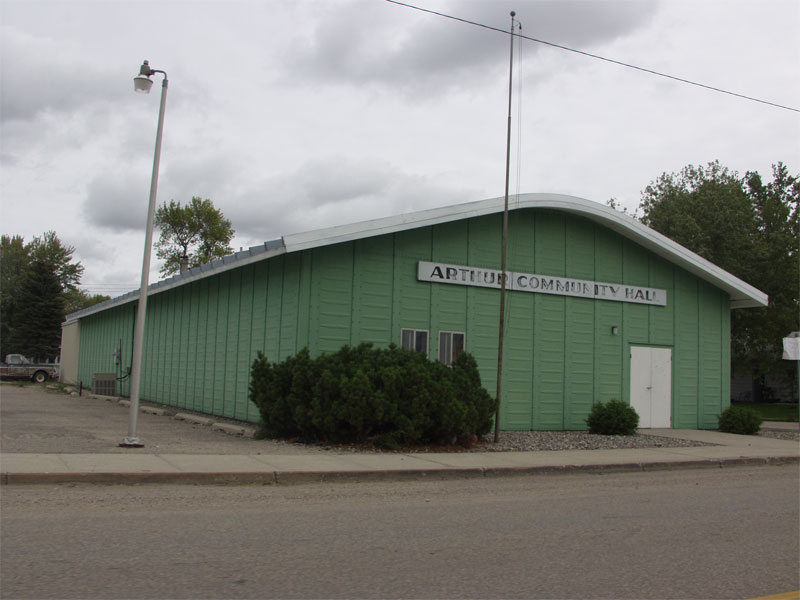
- The Arthur Community Hall (September 2003)
- Interactive map of Arthur, North Dakota
- Location within North Dakota
- Coordinates: 47.1043°N 97.2184°W
- Country: United States
- State: North Dakota
- County: Cass
- Metro: Fargo–Moorhead
- Founded: 1881
- Incorporated (village): June 15, 1921
- Incorporated (city): July 1, 1967
- Founded by: Samuel B. Johnson
- Named after: Chester A. Arthur

Government
  - Type: Mayor–council
  - Mayor: Greg Nelson
  - Auditor: Natalie Keller
  - Councilmembers: Bill Engelke; Todd Olson; Kevin Lautt; Shannon Floan

Area
  - Total: 1.530 sq mi (3.963 km^{2})
  - Land: 1.530 sq mi (3.963 km^{2})
  - Water: 0 sq mi (0.000 km^{2}) 0.00%
- Elevation: 994 ft (303 m)

Population (2020)
  - Total: 328
  - Estimate (2025): 328
  - Density: 214/sq mi (82.8/km^{2})
- Time zone: UTC–6 (Central (CST))
  - Summer (DST): UTC–5 (CDT)
- ZIP Code: 58006
- Area code: 701
- FIPS code: 38-03300
- GNIS feature ID: 1035916
- Highways: ND 18, CR 34
- Website: cityofarthur.com

Arthur is a city in Cass County, North Dakota, United States. The population was 328 as of the 2020 census, and was estimated at 328 in 2025.

== History ==
Arthur was founded in 1881, the town was called Rosedale after the sister of a prominent settler, but was renamed Arthur in honor of Chester A. Arthur.

The post office was established on October 1, 1881, and the town was platted in 1882 by Samuel B. Johnson. Arthur was incorporated as a village on June 15, 1921 and as a city on July 1, 1967.

== Geography ==
According to the United States Census Bureau, the city has a total area of 1.530 square miles (3.96 km^{2}), all land.

It is surrounded by Arthur Township.

== Demographics ==
Historical population
Census	Pop.	Note	%±
1930	322		—
1940	335		4.0%
1950	380		13.4%
1960	325		−14.5%
1970	412		26.8%
1980	445		8.0%
1990	400		−10.1%
2000	402		0.5%
2010	337		−16.2%
2020	328		−2.7%
2025 (est.)	328		0.0%
U.S. Decennial Census; 2020 Census

As of the 2024 American Community Survey, there were 158 estimated households in Arthur with an average of 2.32 persons per household. The city has a median household income of $88,393. Approximately 1.6% of the city's population lives at or below the poverty line. Arthur has an estimated 62.0% employment rate, with 33.7% of the population holding a bachelor's degree or higher and 92.2% holding a high school diploma. There were 165 housing units at an average density of 107.84 per square mile (41.6/km^{2}).

The top five reported languages (people were allowed to report up to two languages, thus the figures will generally add to more than 100%) were English (97.8%), Spanish (0.6%), Indo-European (1.7%), Asian and Pacific Islander (0.0%), and Other (0.0%).

The median age in the city was 42.9 years.

Arthur, North Dakota – racial and ethnic composition Note: the US Census treats Hispanic/Latino as an ethnic category. This table excludes Latinos from the racial categories and assigns them to a separate category. Hispanics/Latinos may be of any race.
Race / ethnicity (NH = non-Hispanic)	Pop. 2000	Pop. 2010	Pop. 2020	% 2000	% 2010	% 2020
White alone (NH)	369	330	315	91.79%	97.92%	96.04%
Black or African American alone (NH)	0	0	2	0.00%	0.00%	0.61%
Native American or Alaska Native alone (NH)	9	0	4	2.24%	0.00%	1.22%
Asian alone (NH)	0	0	1	0.00%	0.00%	0.30%
Pacific Islander alone (NH)	0	0	0	0.00%	0.00%	0.00%
Other race alone (NH)	0	0	1	0.00%	0.00%	0.30%
Mixed race or multiracial (NH)	3	5	3	0.75%	1.48%	0.91%
Hispanic or Latino (any race)	21	2	2	5.22%	0.59%	0.61%
Total	402	337	328	100.00%	100.00%	100.00%

=== 2020 census ===
As of the 2020 census, there were 328 people, 135 households, and 93 families residing in the city. The population density was 214.38 inhabitants per square mile (82.8/km^{2}). There were 146 housing units at an average density of 95.42 per square mile (36.8/km^{2}). The racial makeup of the city was 96.04% White, 0.61% African American, 1.22% Native American, 0.30% Asian, 0.00% Pacific Islander, 0.30% from some other races and 1.52% from two or more races. Hispanic or Latino people of any race were 0.61% of the population.

=== 2010 census ===
As of the 2010 census, there were 337 people, 130 households, and 82 families residing in the city. The population density was 222.44 inhabitants per square mile (85.9/km^{2}). There were 144 housing units at an average density of 95.05 per square mile (36.7/km^{2}). The racial makeup of the city was 98.52% White, 0.00% African American, 0.00% Native American, 0.00% Asian, 0.00% Pacific Islander, 0.00% from some other races and 1.48% from two or more races. Hispanic or Latino people of any race were 0.59% of the population.

There were 130 households, of which 33.1% had children under the age of 18 living with them, 50.0% were married couples living together, 10.0% had a female householder with no husband present, 3.1% had a male householder with no wife present, and 36.9% were non-families. 34.6% of all households were made up of individuals, and 18.5% had someone living alone who was 65 years of age or older. The average household size was 2.35 and the average family size was 3.04.

The median age in the city was 43.6 years. 25.5% of residents were under the age of 18; 6.8% were between the ages of 18 and 24; 19% were from 25 to 44; 22.3% were from 45 to 64; and 26.4% were 65 years of age or older. The gender makeup of the city was 46.3% male and 53.7% female.

=== 2000 census ===
As of the 2000 census, there were 402 people, 129 households, and 82 families residing in the city. The population density was 265.24 inhabitants per square mile (102.4/km^{2}). There were 140 housing units at an average density of 92.37 per square mile (35.7/km^{2}). The racial makeup of the city was 94.53% White, 0.00% African American, 2.24% Native American, 0.00% Asian, 0.00% Pacific Islander, 1.24% from some other races and 1.99% from two or more races. Hispanic or Latino people of any race were 5.22% of the population.

The top six ancestry groups in the city are German (49.3%), Norwegian (32.8%), Swedish (13.9%), Irish (10.7%), English (8.7%), French (6.0%).

There were 129 households, out of which 38.8% had children under the age of 18 living with them, 56.6% were married couples living together, 6.2% had a female householder with no husband present, and 35.7% were non-families. 32.6% of all households were made up of individuals, and 17.8% had someone living alone who was 65 years of age or older. The average household size was 2.56 and the average family size was 3.30.

In the city, the population was spread out, with 28.9% under the age of 18, 2.5% from 18 to 24, 23.6% from 25 to 44, 15.9% from 45 to 64, and 29.1% who were 65 years of age or older. The median age was 40 years. For every 100 females there were 85.3 males. For every 100 females age 18 and over, there were 83.3 males.

The median income for a household in the city was $36,250, and the median income for a family was $41,875. Males had a median income of $28,750 versus $19,583 for females. The per capita income for the city was $13,948. About 7.9% of families and 9.1% of the population were below the poverty line, including 15.9% of those under age 18 and 11.7% of those age 65 or over.

== Education ==
The Northern Cass Public School District 97 was organized in 1996.

- Northern Cass High School (9-12) in Hunter
- Northern Cass Middle School (6-8) in Hunter
- Northern Cass Elementary School (PK-5) in Hunter

The area is served by the Northern Cass Public School District 97. It operates the Hunter School. In the 2025-26 academic year, the district reported a total of 739 students.

== Notable person ==
- Doug Burgum (born 1956) – 33rd Governor of North Dakota and 55th United States Secretary of the Interior
