= Rush River Township, Cass County, North Dakota =

Township in North Dakota, US

Rush River Township, North Dakota
- Township
- Location within North Dakota
- Coordinates: 47°01′15″N 97°08′01″W
- Country: United States
- State: North Dakota
- County: Cass

Area
  - Total: 36.43 sq mi (94.36 km^{2})
  - Land: 36.42 sq mi (94.33 km^{2})
  - Water: 0.012 sq mi (0.03 km^{2})
- Elevation: 932 ft (284 m)

Population (2020)
  - Total: 83
  - Density: 2.3/sq mi (0.88/km^{2})
- Time zone: UTC-6 (Central (CST))
  - Summer (DST): UTC-5 (CDT)
- Area code: 701
- FIPS code: 38-69020
- GNIS feature ID: 1036383

Rush River Township is a township in Cass County, North Dakota, United States. The population was 83 at the 2020 census.

== Geography ==
Rush River Township has a total area of 36.434 square miles (94.36 km^{2}), of which 36.421 square miles (94.33 km^{2}) is land and 0.013 square miles (0.034 km^{2}) is water.

== Demographics ==
As of the 2023 American Community Survey, there were an estimated 36 households.
