= Casselton Township, North Dakota =

Township in North Dakota, US

- Township
- Location within North Dakota
- Coordinates: 46°56′03″N 97°14′31″W
- Country: United States
- State: North Dakota
- County: Cass

Area
  - Total: 33.83 sq mi (87.63 km^{2})
  - Land: 33.83 sq mi (87.63 km^{2})
  - Water: 0 sq mi (0.00 km^{2})
- Elevation: 945 ft (288 m)

Population (2020)
  - Total: 81
  - Density: 2.4/sq mi (0.92/km^{2})
- Time zone: UTC-6 (Central (CST))
  - Summer (DST): UTC-5 (CDT)
- Area code: 701
- FIPS code: 38-12740
- GNIS feature ID: 1036375

Casselton Township is a township in Cass County, North Dakota, United States. The population was 81 at the 2020 census.

== Geography ==
Casselton Township has a total area of 33.84 square miles (87.6 km^{2}), all land.

== Demographics ==
As of the 2023 American Community Survey, there were an estimated 43 households.
