= Alice, North Dakota =

- City
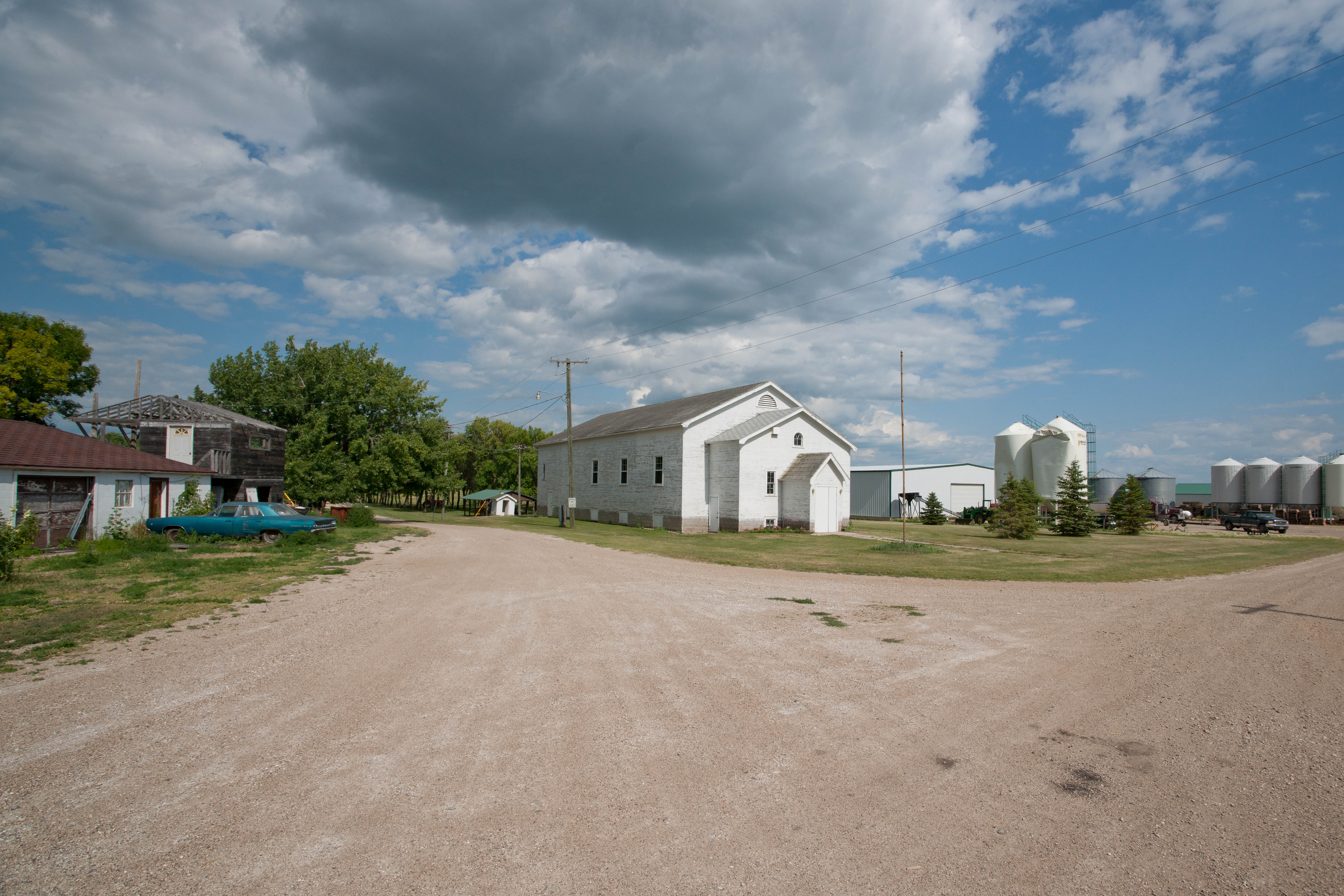
- Buildings in Alice
- Interactive map of Alice, North Dakota
- Location within North Dakota Location within the United States
- Coordinates: 46.7600°N 97.5562°W
- Country: United States
- State: North Dakota
- County: Cass
- Founded: 1900
- Incorporated: 1925

Government
  - Mayor: Dan Lund

Area
  - Total: 0.975 sq mi (2.524 km^{2})
  - Land: 0.975 sq mi (2.524 km^{2})
  - Water: 0 sq mi (0.000 km^{2}) 0.00%
- Elevation: 1,129 ft (344 m)

Population (2020)
  - Total: 41
  - Estimate (2025): 43
  - Density: 42/sq mi (16/km^{2})
- Time zone: UTC–6 (Central (CST))
  - Summer (DST): UTC–5 (CDT)
- ZIP Code: 58031
- Area code: 701
- FIPS code: 38-01420
- GNIS feature ID: 1035904
- Website: casscountynd.gov/alice

Alice is a city in Cass County, North Dakota, United States. The population was 41 as of the 2020 census, and was estimated at 43 in 2025.

== History ==
Alice was laid out and platted in 1900 when the railroad was extended to that point. The name Alice was bestowed in honor of the wife of North Dakota Lieutenant Governor R. S. Lewis. A post office was established at Alice in 1901, and remained in operation until it was discontinued in 1995.

Alice was incorporated in 1925.

John Steinbeck mentioned visiting Alice in Travels with Charley.

== Geography ==
According to the United States Census Bureau, the city has a total area of 0.974 square miles (2.52 km^{2}), all land.

== Demographics ==
Historical population
Census	Pop.	Note	%±
1930	169		—
1940	181		7.1%
1950	162		−10.5%
1960	124		−23.5%
1970	83		−33.1%
1980	62		−25.3%
1990	62		0.0%
2000	56		−9.7%
2010	40		−28.6%
2020	41		2.5%
2025 (est.)	43		4.9%
U.S. Decennial Census; 2020 Census

=== 2020 census ===
As of the 2020 census, there were 41 people, 14 households, and 13 families residing in the city.

=== 2010 census ===
As of the 2010 census, there were 40 people, 18 households, and 13 families living in the city. The population density was 41.7 inhabitants per square mile (16.1/km^{2}). There were 21 housing units at an average density of 21.9 per square mile (8.5/km^{2}). The racial makeup of the city was 100.0% White.

There were 18 households, of which 27.8% had children under the age of 18 living with them, 55.6% were married couples living together, 5.6% had a female householder with no husband present, 11.1% had a male householder with no wife present, and 27.8% were non-families. 27.8% of all households were made up of individuals, and 11.1% had someone living alone who was 65 years of age or older. The average household size was 2.22 and the average family size was 2.62.

The median age in the city was 45.5 years. 22.5% of residents were under the age of 18; 12.5% were between the ages of 18 and 24; 15% were from 25 to 44; 27.5% were from 45 to 64; and 22.5% were 65 years of age or older. The gender makeup of the city was 60.0% male and 40.0% female.

=== 2000 census ===
As of the 2000 census, there were 56 people, 23 households, and 18 families living in the city. The population density was 57.9 inhabitants per square mile (22.4/km^{2}). There were 25 housing units at an average density of 25.8 per square mile (10.0/km^{2}). The racial makeup of the city was 98.21% White, and 1.79% from two or more races.

There were 23 households, out of which 21.7% had children under the age of 18 living with them, 78.3% were married couples living together, and 21.7% were non-families. 17.4% of all households were made up of individuals, and 4.3% had someone living alone who was 65 years of age or older. The average household size was 2.43 and the average family size was 2.78.

In the city, the population was spread out, with 16.1% under the age of 18, 10.7% from 18 to 24, 16.1% from 25 to 44, 41.1% from 45 to 64, and 16.1% who were 65 years of age or older. The median age was 48 years. For every 100 females, there were 133.3 males. For every 100 females age 18 and over, there were 147.4 males.

The median income for a household in the city was $35,750, and the median income for a family was $36,750. Males had a median income of $26,250 versus $18,750 for females. The per capita income for the city was $13,753. None of the population and none of the families were below the poverty line.
