= Erie, North Dakota =

- Census-designated place
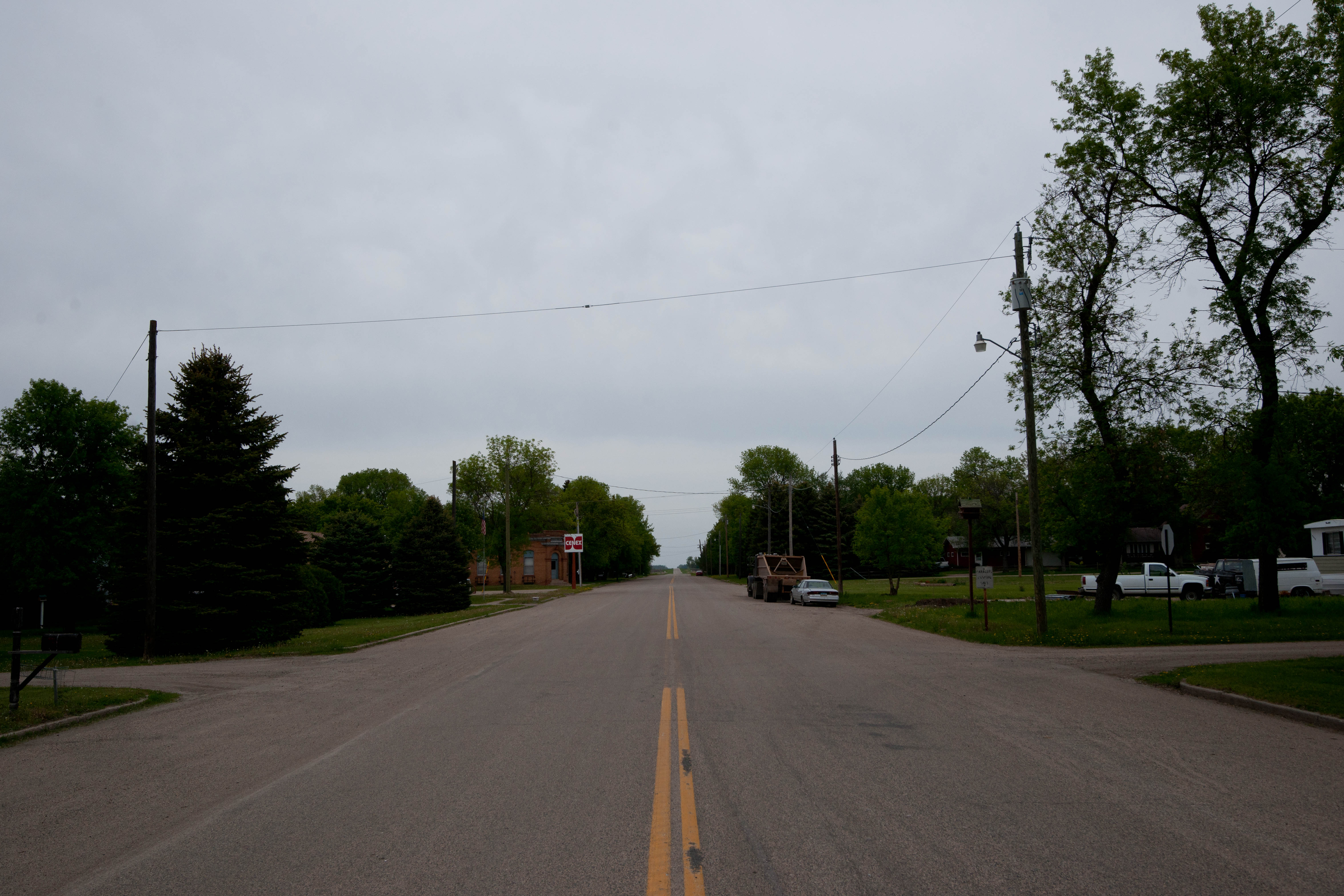
- Street in Erie

- Location within the state of North Dakota
- Coordinates: 47°06′55″N 97°23′16″W
- Country: United States
- State: North Dakota
- County: Cass
- Township: Erie

Area
  - Total: 2.00 sq mi (5.19 km^{2})
  - Land: 2.00 sq mi (5.19 km^{2})
  - Water: 0 sq mi (0.00 km^{2})
- Elevation: 1,135 ft (346 m)

Population (2020)
  - Total: 54
  - Density: 27/sq mi (10.4/km^{2})
- Time zone: UTC-6 (Central (CST))
  - Summer (DST): UTC-5 (CST)
- ZIP code: 58029
- Area code: 701
- FIPS code: 38-24620
- GNIS feature ID: 2392991

Erie is a census-designated place in Cass County, North Dakota, United States. The population was 54 at the 2020 census.

== Geography ==
According to the United States Census Bureau, the CDP has a total area of 2.0 square miles (5.2 km^{2}), all land.

== Demographics ==
Historical population
Census	Pop.	Note	%±
2020	54		—
U.S. Decennial Census

As of the census of 2000, there were 65 people, 29 households, and 18 families residing in the CDP. The population density was 32.6 inhabitants per square mile (12.6/km^{2}). There were 35 housing units at an average density of 17.6/sq mi (6.8/km^{2}). The racial makeup of the CDP was 100.00% White.

There were 29 households, out of which 20.7% had children under the age of 18 living with them, 55.2% were married couples living together, 3.4% had a female householder with no husband present, and 37.9% were non-families. 31.0% of all households were made up of individuals, and 17.2% had someone living alone who was 65 years of age or older. The average household size was 2.24 and the average family size was 2.83.

In the CDP, the population was spread out, with 23.1% under the age of 18, 3.1% from 18 to 24, 16.9% from 25 to 44, 30.8% from 45 to 64, and 26.2% who were 65 years of age or older. The median age was 47 years. For every 100 females, there were 116.7 males. For every 100 females age 18 and over, there were 108.3 males.

The median income for a household in the CDP was $41,250, and the median income for a family was $30,625. Males had a median income of $27,500 versus $18,750 for females. The per capita income for the CDP was $13,165. There were 17.4% of families and 14.6% of the population living below the poverty line, including no under eighteens and none of those over 64.

== Education ==
Erie is divided between Northern Cass Public School District 97 and Hope-Page Public Schools.
