= Normanna Township, Cass County, North Dakota =

Township in North Dakota, US

Normanna Township, North Dakota
- Township
- Location within North Dakota
- Coordinates: 46°40′25″N 96°59′23″W
- Country: United States
- State: North Dakota
- County: Cass

Area
  - Total: 34.44 sq mi (89.19 km^{2})
  - Land: 34.44 sq mi (89.19 km^{2})
  - Water: 0 sq mi (0.00 km^{2})
- Elevation: 935 ft (285 m)

Population (2020)
  - Total: 367
  - Density: 10.7/sq mi (4.11/km^{2})
- Time zone: UTC-6 (Central (CST))
  - Summer (DST): UTC-5 (CDT)
- Area code: 701
- FIPS code: 38-57620
- GNIS feature ID: 1036352

Normanna Township is a township in Cass County, North Dakota, United States. The population was 367 at the 2020 census.

The city of Kindred is entirely surrounded by Normanna Township.

== Geography ==
Normanna Township has a total area of 34.438 square miles (89.19 km^{2}), all land.

=== Major highways ===
- North Dakota Highway 46

== Demographics ==
As of the 2023 American Community Survey, there were an estimated 99 households.
