= Durbin Township, North Dakota =

Township in North Dakota, US

- Township
- Location within North Dakota
- Coordinates: 46°50′51″N 97°06′57″W
- Country: United States
- State: North Dakota
- County: Cass

Area
  - Total: 35.12 sq mi (90.97 km^{2})
  - Land: 35.07 sq mi (90.83 km^{2})
  - Water: 0.050 sq mi (0.13 km^{2})
- Elevation: 915 ft (279 m)

Population (2020)
  - Total: 83
  - Density: 2.4/sq mi (0.91/km^{2})
- Time zone: UTC-6 (Central (CST))
  - Summer (DST): UTC-5 (CDT)
- Area code: 701
- FIPS code: 38-21100
- GNIS feature ID: 1036363

Durbin Township is a township in Cass County, North Dakota, United States. The population was 83 at the 2020 census.

== Geography ==
Durbin Township has a total area of 35.12 square miles (91.0 km^{2}), of which 35.07 square miles (90.8 km^{2}) is land and 0.05 square miles (0.13 km^{2}) is water.

=== Major highways ===
- Interstate 94
- U.S. Highway 52

== Demographics ==
As of the 2023 American Community Survey, there were an estimated 26 households.
