= Gardner, North Dakota =

- City
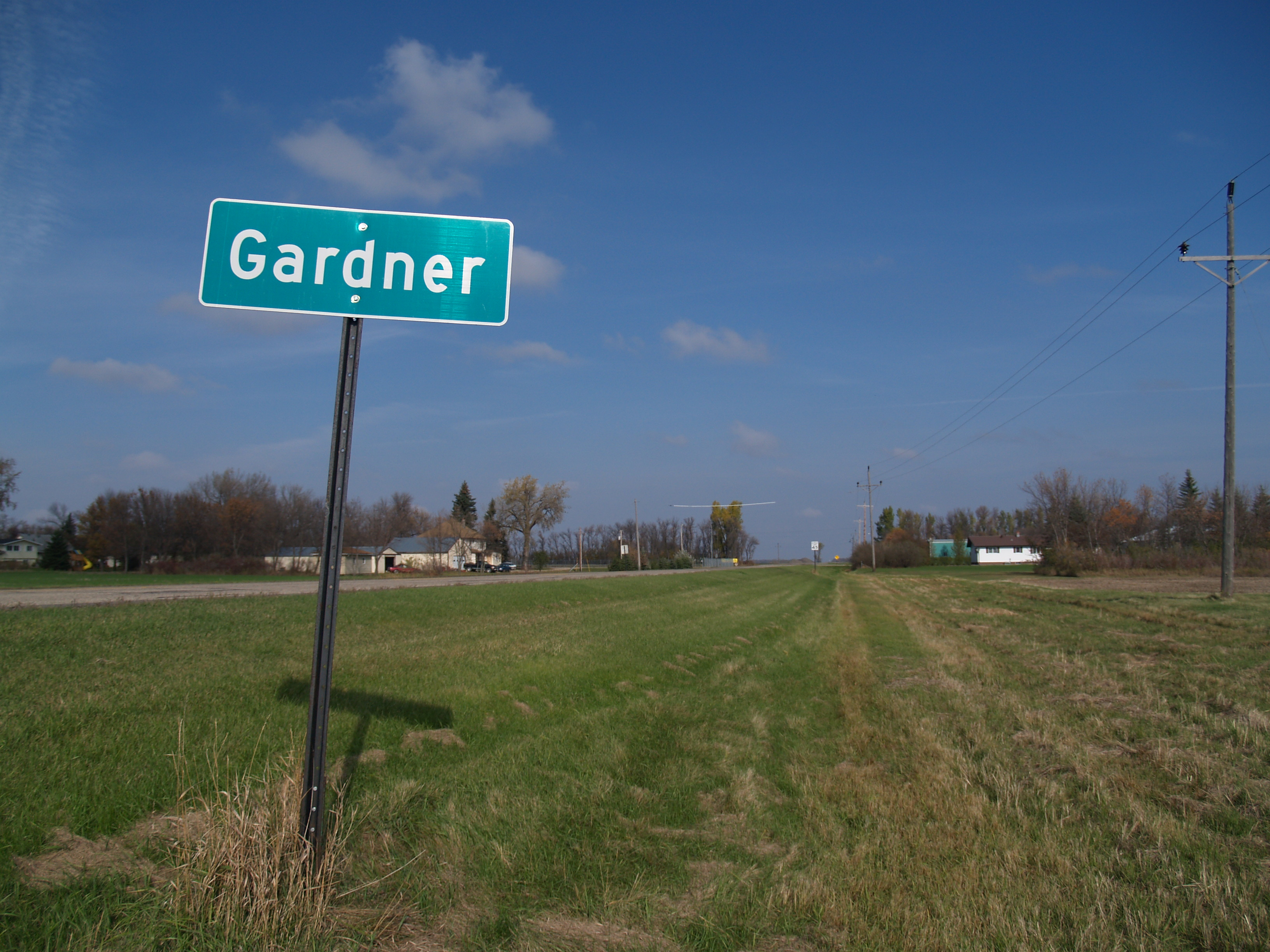
- Sign in Gardner

- Location of Gardner, North Dakota
- Coordinates: 47°08′40″N 96°58′07″W
- Country: United States
- State: North Dakota
- County: Cass
- Founded: 1880

Government
  - Mayor: Patrick Nelson
  - Public Works: Niles Roth

Area
  - Total: 0.50 sq mi (1.29 km^{2})
  - Land: 0.50 sq mi (1.29 km^{2})
  - Water: 0 sq mi (0.00 km^{2})
- Elevation: 889 ft (271 m)

Population (2020)
  - Total: 129
  - Estimate (2022): 127
  - Density: 259.7/sq mi (100.29/km^{2})
- Time zone: UTC-6 (Central (CST))
  - Summer (DST): UTC-5 (CDT)
- ZIP code: 58036
- Area code: 701
- FIPS code: 38-29220
- GNIS feature ID: 1036051

Gardner is a city in Cass County, North Dakota, United States. The population was 129 at the 2020 census.

== History ==
The first settlement at Gardner was made in 1880. A post office has been in operation at Gardner since 1881. Gardner was platted in 1882 when the railroad was extended to that point. Gardner was named in honor of Stephen Gardner, who owned the land where the city is located.

== Geography ==
According to the United States Census Bureau, the city has a total area of 0.50 square miles (1.29 km^{2}), all land.

== Demographics ==
Historical population
| Census | Pop. | Note | %± |
|---|---|---|---|
| 1930 | 108 | | — |
| 1940 | 103 | | −4.6% |
| 1950 | 136 | | 32.0% |
| 1960 | 107 | | −21.3% |
| 1970 | 96 | | −10.3% |
| 1980 | 94 | | −2.1% |
| 1990 | 85 | | −9.6% |
| 2000 | 80 | | −5.9% |
| 2010 | 74 | | −7.5% |
| 2020 | 129 | | 74.3% |
| 2022 (est.) | 127 | | −1.6% |
U.S. Decennial Census; 2020 Census

=== 2010 census ===
As of the census of 2010, there were 74 people, 29 households, and 24 families living in the city. The population density was 148.0 inhabitants per square mile (57.1/km^{2}). There were 35 housing units at an average density of 70.0 per square mile (27.0/km^{2}). The racial makeup of the city was 99.9% White. Hispanic or Latino of any race were 2.7% of the population.

There were 29 households, of which 34.5% had children under the age of 18 living with them, 72.4% were married couples living together, 6.9% had a female householder with no husband present, 3.4% had a male householder with no wife present, and 17.2% were non-families. 13.8% of all households were made up of individuals, and 3.4% had someone living alone who was 65 years of age or older. The average household size was 2.55 and the average family size was 2.83.

The median age in the city was 32.3 years. 25.7% of residents were under the age of 18; 4.1% were between the ages of 18 and 24; 36.5% were from 25 to 44; 24.4% were from 45 to 64; and 9.5% were 65 years of age or older. The gender makeup of the city was 45.9% male and 54.1% female.

=== 2000 census ===
As of the census of 2000, there were 80 people, 35 households, and 19 families living in the city. The population density was 173.3 inhabitants per square mile (66.9/km^{2}). There were 39 housing units at an average density of 84.5 per square mile (32.6/km^{2}). The racial makeup of the city was 100.00% White. Hispanic or Latino of any race were 5.00% of the population.

There were 35 households, out of which 31.4% had children under the age of 18 living with them, 45.7% were married couples living together, 5.7% had a female householder with no husband present, and 45.7% were non-families. 37.1% of all households were made up of individuals, and 14.3% had someone living alone who was 65 years of age or older. The average household size was 2.29 and the average family size was 3.16.

In the city, the population was spread out, with 27.5% under the age of 18, 3.8% from 18 to 24, 27.5% from 25 to 44, 27.5% from 45 to 64, and 13.8% who were 65 years of age or older. The median age was 39 years. For every 100 females, there were 100.0 males. For every 100 females age 18 and over, there were 100.0 males.

The median income for a household in the city was $31,250, and the median income for a family was $51,875. Males had a median income of $35,833 versus $26,250 for females. The per capita income for the city was $16,278. There were 7.7% of families and 20.3% of the population living below the poverty line, including 35.3% of under eighteens and 16.7% of those over 64.

== Transportation ==
Amtrak’s Empire Builder, which operates between Seattle/Portland and Chicago, passes through the town on BNSF tracks, but makes no stop. The nearest station is located in Fargo, 23 miles (37 km) to the south.
