= Mapleton Township, North Dakota =

Township in North Dakota, US

- Township
- Location within North Dakota
- Coordinates: 46°50′53″N 96°59′23″W
- Country: United States
- State: North Dakota
- County: Cass

Area
  - Total: 33.71 sq mi (87.31 km^{2})
  - Land: 33.60 sq mi (87.03 km^{2})
  - Water: 0.10 sq mi (0.27 km^{2})
- Elevation: 906 ft (276 m)

Population (2020)
  - Total: 191
  - Density: 5.68/sq mi (2.19/km^{2})
- Time zone: UTC-6 (Central (CST))
  - Summer (DST): UTC-5 (CDT)
- Area code: 701
- FIPS code: 38-50620
- GNIS feature ID: 1036361

Mapleton Township is a township in Cass County, North Dakota, United States. The population was 191 at the 2020 census.

== Geography ==
Mapleton Township has a total area of 33.709 square miles (87.31 km^{2}), of which 33.604 square miles (87.03 km^{2}) is land and 0.105 square miles (0.27 km^{2}) is water.

=== Major highways ===
- Interstate 94

== Demographics ==
As of the 2023 American Community Survey, there were an estimated 72 households.
