= North Dakota Highway 38 =

State highway in North Dakota, U.S.

North Dakota Highway 38
- ND 38 highlighted in red

Route information
- Maintained by NDDOT
- Length: 36.332 mi (58.471 km)
- Existed: 1926–present

Major junctions
- South end: I-94 / US 52 south of Buffalo
- North end: ND 32 west of Hope

Location
- Country: United States
- State: North Dakota
- Counties: Cass, Steele

Highway system
- North Dakota State Highway System; Interstate; US; State
← ND 37	→ ND 40

North Dakota Highway 38 (ND 38) is a 36.332-mile-long (58.471 km) north–south state highway in the U.S. state of North Dakota. ND 38's southern terminus is at Interstate 94 (I 94)/US Highway 52 (US 52) south of Buffalo, and the northern terminus is at ND 32 west of Hope.

== Major intersections ==
County	Location	mi	km	Destinations	Notes
Cass	Hill-Howes township line	0.000	0.000	I-94 / US 52 – Bismarck, Fargo CR 38 south – Alice	Southern terminus; roadway continues south as CR 38; I-94 Exit 314
Steele	Melrose-Carpenter township line	36.332	58.471	ND 32 – ND 200, Finley, Oriska CR 5 west – Luverne	Northern terminus; roadway continues west as CR 5
1.000 mi = 1.609 km; 1.000 km = 0.621 mi
