= Hunter, North Dakota =

- City
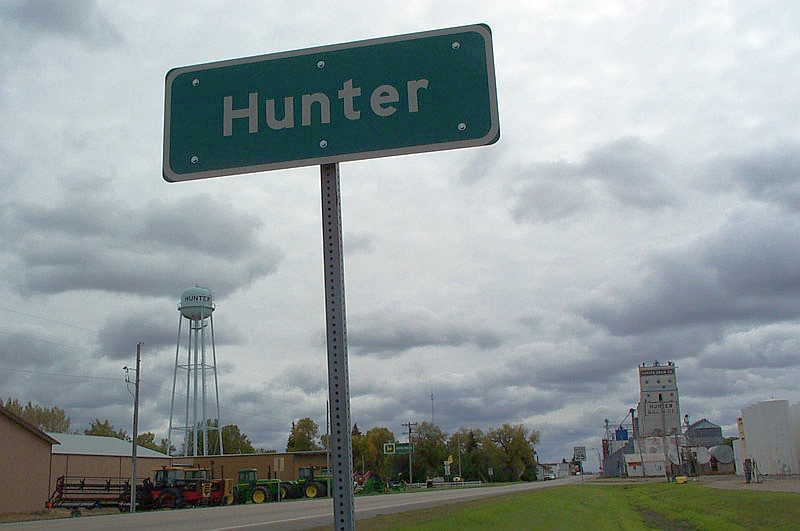
- Hunter, North Dakota

- Logo

- Location of Hunter, North Dakota
- Coordinates: 47°11′25″N 97°12′47″W
- Country: United States
- State: North Dakota
- County: Cass
- Founded: 1881
- Incorporated: 1885

Government
  - Mayor: Tim Nelson

Area
  - Total: 1.51 sq mi (3.90 km^{2})
  - Land: 1.49 sq mi (3.87 km^{2})
  - Water: 0.012 sq mi (0.03 km^{2})
- Elevation: 974 ft (297 m)

Population (2020)
  - Total: 332
  - Estimate (2022): 329
  - Density: 222.2/sq mi (85.81/km^{2})
- Time zone: UTC-6 (Central (CST))
  - Summer (DST): UTC-5 (CDT)
- ZIP code: 58048
- Area code: 701
- FIPS code: 38-39460
- GNIS feature ID: 1036097
- Website: cityofhunter.com

Hunter is a city in Cass County, North Dakota, United States. The population was 332 at the 2020 census.

The city was founded in 1881 and incorporated in 1885.

== History ==
Hunter was first called Delano, and under the latter name was platted in 1880 when the railroad was extended to that point. The name Hunter was adopted in 1881 for John Hunter, a local landowner. According to legend, John Hunter promised to help build the town a church in exchange for the naming rights.

== Geography ==
According to the United States Census Bureau, the city has a total area of 1.53 square miles (3.96 km^{2}), of which 1.52 square miles (3.94 km^{2}) is land and 0.01 square miles (0.03 km^{2}) is water.

== Demographics ==
Historical population
Census	Pop.	Note	%±
1890	194		—
1900	407		109.8%
1910	365		−10.3%
1920	424		16.2%
1930	400		−5.7%
1940	414		3.5%
1950	417		0.7%
1960	446		7.0%
1970	362		−18.8%
1980	369		1.9%
1990	341		−7.6%
2000	326		−4.4%
2010	261		−19.9%
2020	332		27.2%
2022 (est.)	329		−0.9%
U.S. Decennial Census; 2020 Census

=== 2010 census ===
As of the census of 2010, there were 261 people, 115 households, and 77 families living in the city. The population density was 171.7 inhabitants per square mile (66.3/km^{2}). There were 138 housing units at an average density of 90.8 per square mile (35.1/km^{2}). The racial makeup of the city was 97.7% White and 2.3% from two or more races.

There were 115 households, of which 27.0% had children under the age of 18 living with them, 54.8% were married couples living together, 3.5% had a female householder with no husband present, 8.7% had a male householder with no wife present, and 33.0% were non-families. 29.6% of all households were made up of individuals, and 12.2% had someone living alone who was 65 years of age or older. The average household size was 2.27 and the average family size was 2.69.

The median age in the city was 44.4 years. 23.4% of residents were under the age of 18; 6.4% were between the ages of 18 and 24; 21% were from 25 to 44; 30.3% were from 45 to 64; and 18.8% were 65 years of age or older. The gender makeup of the city was 52.9% male and 47.1% female.

=== 2000 census ===
As of the census of 2000, there were 326 people, 141 households, and 84 families living in the city. The population density was 212.4 inhabitants per square mile (82.0/km^{2}). There were 160 housing units at an average density of 104.2 per square mile (40.2/km^{2}). The racial makeup of the city was 98.47% White, and 1.53% from two or more races. Hispanic or Latino of any race were 1.23% of the population.

There were 141 households, out of which 24.8% had children under the age of 18 living with them, 51.8% were married couples living together, 5.0% had a female householder with no husband present, and 40.4% were non-families. 37.6% of all households were made up of individuals, and 22.7% had someone living alone who was 65 years of age or older. The average household size was 2.31 and the average family size was 3.00.

In the city, the population was spread out, with 27.9% under the age of 18, 3.7% from 18 to 24, 23.6% from 25 to 44, 19.6% from 45 to 64, and 25.2% who were 65 years of age or older. The median age was 40 years. For every 100 females there were 90.6 males. For every 100 females age 18 and over, there were 95.8 males.

The median income for a household in the city was $38,750, and the median income for a family was $47,500. Males had a median income of $31,477 versus $22,000 for females. The per capita income for the city was $25,100. None of the families and 1.7% of the population were living below the poverty line, including none under 18 and 5.5% of those over 64.

== Notable people ==
- James H. Critchfield (born 1917), Central Intelligence Agency officer
- Richard Critchfield (born 1931), journalist
- Edgar S. Furniss (born 1890), economist
- Roger L. Worsley (born 1937), educator
