= Cass County, North Dakota =

County in North Dakota, United States

- County
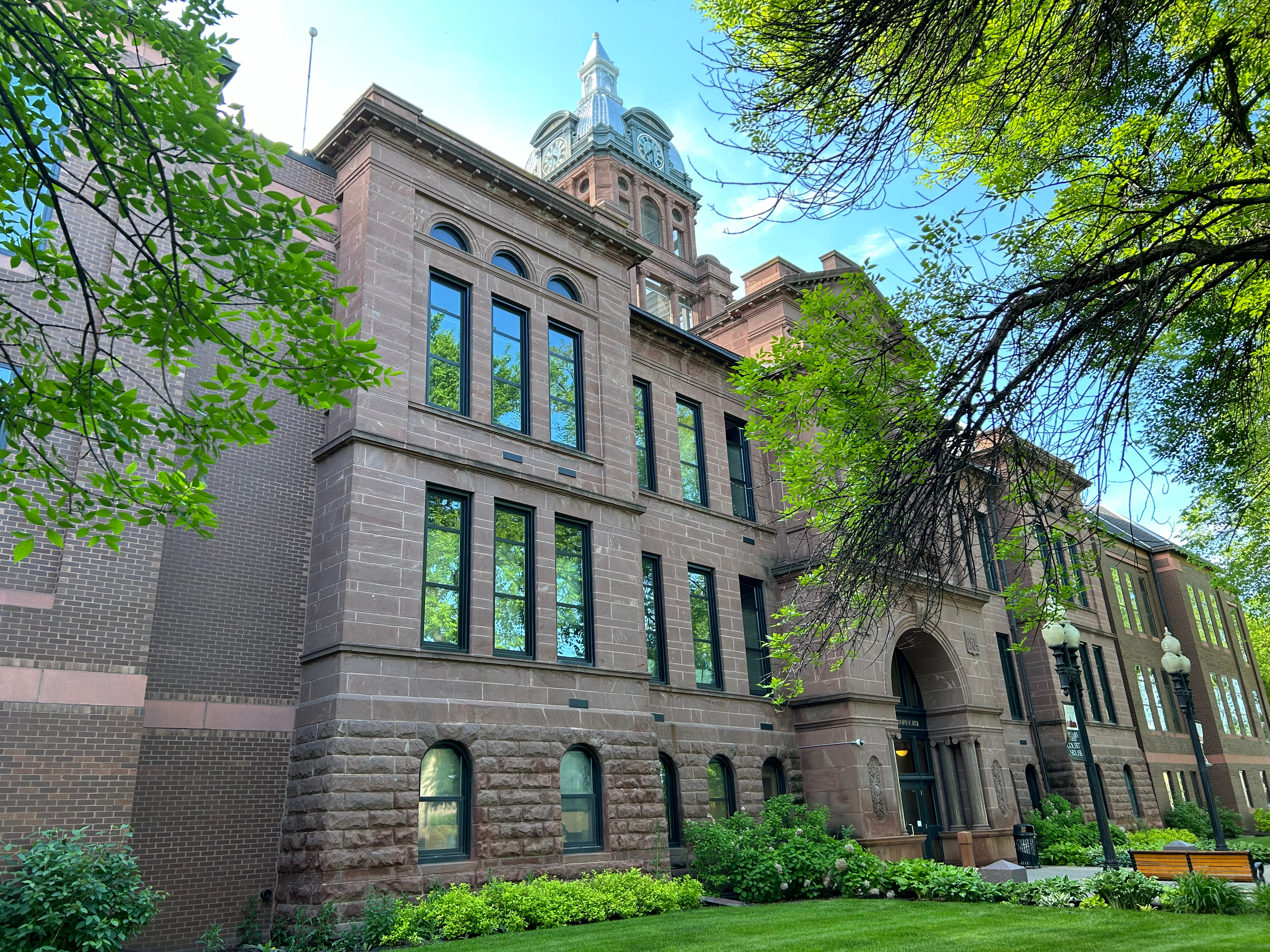
- Cass County Courthouse in Fargo

- Seal Logo

- Location within the U.S. state of North Dakota
- Coordinates: 46.9270°N 97.2524°W
- Country: United States
- State: North Dakota
- Founded: January 4, 1873 (created); October 27, 1873 (organized)
- Named for: George Washington Cass
- Seat: Fargo
- Largest city: Fargo

Area
  - Total: 1,767.811 sq mi (4,578.61 km^{2})
  - Land: 1,764.935 sq mi (4,571.16 km^{2})
  - Water: 2.876 sq mi (7.45 km^{2}) 0.16%

Population (2020)
  - Total: 184,525
  - Estimate (2025): 201,794 ▲
  - Density: 104.551/sq mi (40.3672/km^{2})
- Time zone: UTC−6 (Central)
  - Summer (DST): UTC−5 (CDT)
- Area code: 701
- Congressional district: At-large
- Website: casscountynd.gov

Cass County is a county in the U.S. state of North Dakota. As of the 2020 census, the population was 184,525, and was estimated to be 201,794 in 2025, making it the most populous county in North Dakota, almost twice the population of Burleigh County, the second most populated county in the state. The county seat and the largest city is Fargo, the most populous city in North Dakota and the 216th-most populous city in the United States. It contains over 25.24% of the state's population. The county is named for George Washington Cass, president of the Northern Pacific Railway from 1872 to 1875. It is the only Cass County in the United States that is not named after Lewis Cass.

Cass County is part of the Fargo, ND-Moorhead, MN Metropolitan Statistical Area.

== History ==
Cass County was defined by action of the Dakota Territory legislature on January 4, 1873, and its organization was affected on October 27 of that year. It was named for railroad executive George Washington Cass (1810–1888). Its boundaries were altered in 1875, and in 1961.

== Geography ==
Cass County lies on the east side of North Dakota. Its east boundary line abuts the west boundary line of the state of Minnesota across the river. The Red River flows northward along the county's east boundary, on its way to Lake Winnipeg and Hudson Bay. The county's terrain consists of low rolling hills, devoted to agriculture except around developed areas. Its terrain slopes to the north and east, with its highest point on the southwestern corner at 1,194 ft (364 m) ASL.

According to the United States Census Bureau, the county has a total area of 1,767.811 square miles (4,578.61 km^{2}), of which 1,764.935 square miles (4,571.16 km^{2}) is land and 2.876 square miles (7.45 km^{2}) (0.16%) is water. It is the 10th-county in North Dakota by total area.

=== Major highways ===
- Interstate 29
- Interstate 94
- U.S. Highway 10
- U.S. Highway 52
- U.S. Highway 81
- North Dakota Highway 10
- North Dakota Highway 18
- North Dakota Highway 38
- North Dakota Highway 46
- North Dakota Highway 294

=== Transit ===
- Amtrak Empire Builder (Fargo station)
- Jefferson Lines
- MATBUS

=== Adjacent counties ===
- Traill County - north
- Norman County, Minnesota - northeast
- Clay County, Minnesota - east
- Richland County - southeast
- Ransom County - southwest
- Barnes County - west
- Steele County - northwest

=== Lakes ===
Cass County has the following lakes:

- Brewer Lake
- Lake Bertha

== Demographics ==
Historical population
Census	Pop.	Note	%±
1880	8,998		—
1890	19,613		118.0%
1900	28,625		45.9%
1910	33,935		18.6%
1920	41,477		22.2%
1930	48,735		17.5%
1940	52,849		8.4%
1950	58,877		11.4%
1960	66,947		13.7%
1970	73,653		10.0%
1980	88,247		19.8%
1990	102,874		16.6%
2000	123,138		19.7%
2010	149,778		21.6%
2020	184,525		23.2%
2025 (est.)	201,794	▲	9.4%
U.S. Decennial Census; 1790–1960 1900–1990; 1990–2000 2010–2020

As of the third quarter of 2025, the median home value in Cass County was $315,841.

As of the 2024 American Community Survey, there are 90,427 estimated households in Cass County with an average of 2.15 persons per household. The county has a median household income of $76,056. Approximately 12.4% of the county's population lives at or below the poverty line. Cass County has an estimated 71.9% employment rate, with 42.5% of the population holding a bachelor's degree or higher and 95.0% holding a high school diploma. There were 92,455 housing units at an average density of 52.38 per square mile (20.2/km^{2}).

The top five reported languages (people were allowed to report up to two languages, thus the figures will generally add to more than 100%) were English (92.7%), Spanish (0.3%), Indo-European (0.2%), Asian and Pacific Islander (0.0%), and Other (6.7%).

The median age in the county was 33.7 years.

Cass County, North Dakota – racial and ethnic composition Note: the US Census treats Hispanic/Latino as an ethnic category. This table excludes Latinos from the racial categories and assigns them to a separate category. Hispanics/Latinos may be of any race.
Race / ethnicity (NH = non-Hispanic)	Pop. 1980	Pop. 1990	Pop. 2000	Pop. 2010	Pop. 2020	Pop. 2024
White alone (NH)	86,522 (98.05%)	99,986 (97.19%)	116,263 (94.42%)	135,530 (90.49%)	149,442 (80.99%)	162,413 (80.82%)
Black or African American alone (NH)	141 (0.16%)	274 (0.27%)	978 (0.79%)	3,372 (2.25%)	12,761 (6.92%)	15,652 (7.79%)
Native American or Alaska Native alone (NH)	501 (0.57%)	918 (0.89%)	1,277 (1.04%)	1,681 (1.12%)	2,367 (1.28%)	2,780 (1.38%)
Asian alone (NH)	392 (0.44%)	973 (0.95%)	1,543 (1.25%)	3,524 (2.35%)	6,034 (3.27%)	7,555 (3.76%)
Pacific Islander alone (NH)	—	—	42 (0.03%)	49 (0.03%)	79 (0.04%)	64 (0.03%)
Other race alone (NH)	176 (0.20%)	23 (0.02%)	96 (0.08%)	140 (0.09%)	459 (0.25%)	—
Mixed race or multiracial (NH)	—	—	1,421 (1.15%)	2,467 (1.65%)	7,201 (3.90%)	4,703 (2.34%)
Hispanic or Latino (any race)	515 (0.58%)	700 (0.68%)	1,518 (1.23%)	3,015 (2.01%)	6,182 (3.35%)	7,778 (3.87%)
Total	88,247 (100.00%)	102,874 (100.00%)	123,138 (100.00%)	149,778 (100.00%)	184,525 (100.00%)	200,945 (100.00%)

=== 2024 estimate ===
As of the 2024 estimate, there were 200,945 people, 90,427 households, and _ families residing in the county. The population density was 113.85 inhabitants per square mile (44.0/km^{2}). There were 92,455 housing units at an average density of 52.38 per square mile (20.2/km^{2}). The racial makeup of the county was 84.06% White, 7.92% African American, 1.61% Native American, 3.81% Asian, 0.05% Pacific Islander, _% from some other races and 2.54% from two or more races. Hispanic or Latino people of any race were 3.87% of the population.

=== 2020 census ===
As of the 2020 census, there were 184,525 people, 78,672 households, and 42,849 families residing in the county. The population density was 104.55 inhabitants per square mile (40.4/km^{2}). There were 85,397 housing units at an average density of 48.39 inhabitants per square mile (18.7/km^{2}). The racial makeup of the county was 82.00% White, 7.03% African American, 1.42% Native American, 3.29% Asian, 0.05% Pacific Islander, 1.08% from some other races and 5.14% from two or more races. Hispanic or Latino people of any race were 3.35% of the population.

There were 78,672 households in the county, of which 27.7% had children under the age of 18 living with them and 26.3% had a female householder with no spouse or partner present. About 35.0% of all households were made up of individuals and 9.0% had someone living alone who was 65 years of age or older.

Of the residents, 22.5% were under the age of 18 and 12.5% were 65 years of age or older; the median age was 33.4 years. For every 100 females there were 102.2 males, and for every 100 females age 18 and over there were 101.4 males.

There were 85,397 housing units, 7.9% were vacant. Among occupied housing units, 51.2% were owner-occupied and 48.8% were renter-occupied. The homeowner vacancy rate was 1.5% and the rental vacancy rate was 10.0%.

=== 2010 census ===
As of the 2010 census, there were 149,778 people, 63,899 households, and 35,215 families in the county. The population density was 84.86 inhabitants per square mile (32.8/km^{2}). There were 67,938 housing units at an average density of 38.49 inhabitants per square mile (14.9/km^{2}). The racial makeup of the county was 91.67% White, 2.29% African American, 1.22% Native American, 2.36% Asian, 0.03% Pacific Islander, 0.53% from some other races and 1.89% from two or more races. Hispanic or Latino people of any race were 2.01% of the population.

In terms of ancestry, 45.4% were German, 35.8% were Norwegian, 9.2% were Irish, 6.3% were Swedish, and 1.7% were American.

There were 63,899 households, 27.8% had children under the age of 18 living with them, 42.9% were married couples living together, 8.3% had a female householder with no husband present, 44.9% were non-families, and 33.0% of all households were made up of individuals. The average household size was 2.27 and the average family size was 2.94. The median age was 31.5 years.

The median income for a household in the county was $47,600 and the median income for a family was $68,858. Males had a median income of $42,557 versus $31,916 for females. The per capita income for the county was $28,184. About 5.8% of families and 12.8% of the population were below the poverty line, including 11.0% of those under age 18 and 10.1% of those age 65 or over.

== Government ==
=== County Commissioners ===
Cass County is governed by a board of commissioners elected to four-year terms. Other elected officials include the sheriff and state's attorney. Appointed officials include administrator, extension agent, director of tax equalization, finance auditor, highway engineer, human services officer, information technology coordinator, recorder, veterans service officer, and weed control officer.

District	Commissioner	Assumed office	Current term ends
1st	Tim Flakoll (Vice Chair)	2024	2028
2nd	Tony Grindberg (Chair)	2022	2026
3rd	Jim Kapitan	2020	2024
4th	Duane Breitling	2018	2026
5th	Joel Vettel	2024	2028

The current Sheriff is Jesse F. Jahner. Jahner has served as Sheriff of Cass County since January 2, 2019.

The voters of Cass County have historically tended to vote Republican. As recently as the 2004 presidential election, George W. Bush carried Cass County with nearly 60 percent of the vote. However, in recent elections, the county has become more politically diverse and competitive, particularly in Fargo. In 2008, Democratic candidate Barack Obama won the majority of votes in Cass County, with a voting percentage very close to the percentage Obama received in the entire nation, while John McCain won the majority of votes in North Dakota. Mitt Romney's winning margin in 2012 over Obama in Cass County was 49.9% to 47%, while Donald Trump received 49.3% of votes in 2016 (52.69% in 2024), compared to 38.8% for Hillary Clinton and 11.9% for third-party candidates. In 2018, Democratic Senator Heidi Heitkamp achieved a 14-point lead in Eastern North Dakota, although the state as a whole soundly elected Republican Kevin Cramer.

In the North Dakota Legislative Assembly, Fargo falls into 9 districts: 10th, 11th, 16th, 21st, 27th, 41st and 44th-46th. In the House, it's represented by 7 Democrats and 11 Republicans, in Senate by 4 Democrats and 5 Republicans.

United States presidential election results for Cass County, North Dakota
Year	Republican		Democratic		Third party(ies)	
Year	No.	%	No.	%	No.	%
1892	2,022	53.98%	0	0.00%	1,724	46.02%
1896	3,050	58.80%	2,089	40.27%	48	0.93%
1900	3,485	65.68%	1,636	30.83%	185	3.49%
1904	3,788	80.41%	609	12.93%	314	6.67%
1908	3,681	62.53%	2,000	33.97%	206	3.50%
1912	1,316	26.22%	1,814	36.14%	1,889	37.64%
1916	3,093	46.68%	3,303	49.85%	230	3.47%
1920	10,735	77.02%	2,817	20.21%	386	2.77%
1924	9,906	65.86%	1,352	8.99%	3,783	25.15%
1928	12,480	66.18%	6,315	33.49%	63	0.33%
1932	8,937	43.82%	11,094	54.40%	363	1.78%
1936	7,632	35.22%	12,400	57.22%	1,638	7.56%
1940	12,567	51.11%	11,911	48.45%	108	0.44%
1944	10,661	50.37%	10,390	49.09%	116	0.55%
1948	11,430	52.34%	9,937	45.51%	469	2.15%
1952	18,094	66.17%	9,193	33.62%	57	0.21%
1956	16,932	63.25%	9,821	36.69%	17	0.06%
1960	17,498	58.89%	12,213	41.11%	0	0.00%
1964	12,972	45.25%	15,674	54.67%	23	0.08%
1968	15,240	55.88%	10,819	39.67%	1,212	4.44%
1972	21,770	59.96%	14,073	38.76%	463	1.28%
1976	22,583	54.53%	17,879	43.17%	949	2.29%
1980	23,886	54.76%	13,562	31.09%	6,172	14.15%
1984	29,221	61.35%	18,054	37.91%	354	0.74%
1988	26,699	54.34%	22,107	44.99%	331	0.67%
1992	25,312	47.65%	18,077	34.03%	9,727	18.31%
1996	24,238	48.02%	21,693	42.98%	4,540	9.00%
2000	33,536	56.85%	21,451	36.36%	4,008	6.79%
2004	39,619	59.39%	26,010	38.99%	1,082	1.62%
2008	32,566	45.34%	37,622	52.37%	1,646	2.29%
2012	36,855	49.90%	34,712	47.00%	2,288	3.10%
2016	39,816	49.26%	31,361	38.80%	9,644	11.93%
2020	42,619	49.53%	40,311	46.84%	3,123	3.63%
2024	47,873	52.69%	40,304	44.36%	2,674	2.94%

== Communities ==
=== Cities ===
- Alice
- Amenia
- Argusville
- Arthur
- Ayr
- Briarwood
- Buffalo
- Casselton
- Davenport
- Enderlin
- Fargo (county seat)
- Frontier
- Gardner
- Grandin
- Harwood
- Horace
- Hunter
- Kindred
- Leonard
- Mapleton
- North River
- Oxbow
- Page
- Prairie Rose
- Reile's Acres
- Tower City
- West Fargo

=== Census-designated places ===
- Brooktree Park
- Embden
- Erie
- Wheatland

=== Unincorporated communities ===
- Absaraka
- Chaffee
- Durbin
- Everest
- Hickson
- Lynchburg
- Prosper
- Wild Rice

=== Townships ===
- Addison
- Amenia
- Arthur
- Ayr
- Barnes
- Bell
- Berlin
- Buffalo
- Casselton
- Clifton
- Cornell
- Davenport
- Dows
- Durbin
- Eldred
- Empire
- Erie
- Everest
- Fargo
- Gardner
- Gill
- Gunkel
- Harmony
- Harwood
- Highland
- Hill
- Howes
- Hunter
- Kinyon
- Lake
- Leonard
- Maple River
- Mapleton
- Noble
- Normanna
- Page
- Pleasant
- Pontiac
- Raymond
- Reed
- Rich
- Rochester
- Rush River
- Stanley
- Tower
- Walburg
- Warren
- Watson
- Wheatland
- Wiser

== Education ==
School districts include:

K-12:

- Central Cass Public School, District 17, Casselton
- Enderlin Area Public School, District 24, Enderlin
- Fargo Public Schools, District 1, Fargo
- Hope-Page Public Schools, District 85, Page
- Kindred Public School, District 2, Kindred
- Northern Cass Public School, District 97, Hunter
- Maple Valley Public School, District 4, Tower City
- May-Port CG Public School, District 14, Mayville
- West Fargo Public Schools, District 6, West Fargo

Elementary:

- Mapleton Public School, District 7, Mapleton

== See also ==
- National Register of Historic Places listings in Cass County, North Dakota
