= Bismarck metropolitan area =

Metropolitan area in North Dakota, US

Coordinates: 46°49′N 100°50′W

Bismarck Metropolitan Area
- Metropolitan Statistical Area
- Bismarck, ND Metropolitan Statistical Area
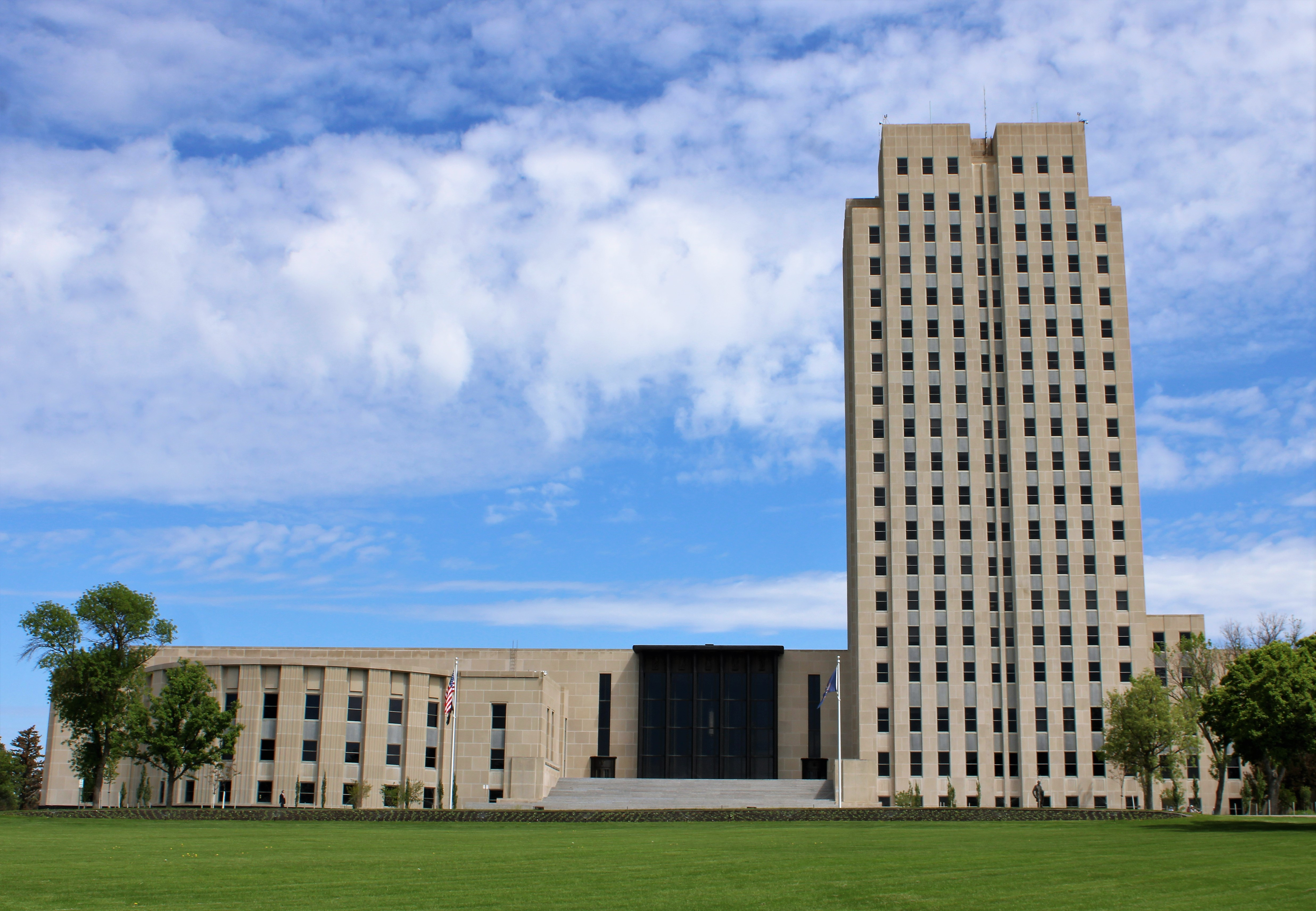
- North Dakota State Capitol
Interactive Map of Bismarck, ND MSA
City of Bismarck
City of Mandan
Bismarck, ND MSA
- Country: United States
- State: North Dakota
- Largest city: Bismarck
- Other city: Mandan

Population (2020)
  - Total: 133,626
  - Estimate (2023): 135,786
  - Rank: 305th in the U.S.
  - Density: 31.7/sq mi (12.25/km^{2})
- Time zones: UTC–6 (CST)
  - Summer (DST): UTC–5 (CDT)
- UTC–7 (MST)
  - Summer (DST): UTC–6 (MDT)
- Area code: 701

Bismarck–Mandan, colloquially referred to as BisMan, is the metropolitan area composed of Burleigh, Morton, and Oliver counties in the state of North Dakota.

Its core cities, Bismarck and Mandan, are located on opposite sides of the upper Missouri River. Lincoln is a suburb located immediately south-east of Bismarck. The 2023 population of the MSA was estimated at 135,786. The area grew considerably with the addition of Oliver and Sioux counties in 2013. However, with relatively sparse populations, the addition of Oliver and Sioux counties only added approximately 6,300 people to the metropolitan population, many of whom were later excluded when Sioux county was removed in 2018. The 2020 Bismarck–Mandan–Lincoln urban population is estimated at 98,198.

== Counties ==
In 2013, the Office of Management and Budget revised the definitions of metropolitan statistical areas; the Bismarck–Mandan MSA was enlarged by the inclusion of Oliver and Sioux counties from that year. In 2018, the same office removed Sioux county from the MSA.

- Burleigh County (100,012)
- Morton County (33,895)
- Oliver County (1,879)

== Core cities ==
- Bismarck (74,445)
- Mandan (22,519)
- Lincoln (4,358)

Historical population
Census	Pop.	Note	%±
1880	3,446		—
1890	9,439		173.9%
1900	15,140		60.4%
1910	41,953		177.1%
1920	42,025		0.2%
1930	48,365		15.1%
1940	51,198		5.9%
1950	51,755		1.1%
1960	61,280		18.4%
1970	66,978		9.3%
1980	86,103		28.6%
1990	89,973		4.5%
2000	100,828		12.1%
2010	114,778		13.8%
2020	133,626		16.4%
2023 (est.)	135,786		1.6%
U.S. Decennial Census; 2020 Census

== Other cities and towns ==
- Almont
- Arena
- Baldwin
- Breien
- Center
- Driscoll
- Fallon
- Flasher
- Fort Rice
- Glen Ullin
- Hannover
- Harmon
- Hebron
- Hensler
- Huff
- Lincoln
- McKenzie
- Menoken
- Moffit
- New Salem
- Price
- Regan
- Saint Anthony
- Sanger
- Sims
- Sterling
- Wilton
- Wing

== Demographics ==
As of the census of 2000, there were 100,828 people, 45,751 households, and 29,620 families residing within the MSA. The racial makeup of the MSA was 95.24% White, 0.23% African American, 3.04% Native American, 0.37% Asian, 0.02% Pacific Islander, 0.16% from other races, and 0.93% from two or more races. Hispanic or Latino of any race were 0.67% of the population.

The median income for a household in the MSA was $39,169, and the median income for a family was $48,339. Males had a median income of $32,726 versus $21,364 for females. The per capita income for the MSA was $18,819.

== See also ==
- North Dakota statistical areas
