= Rock Hill Township, North Dakota =

- Township
- Location within North Dakota
- Coordinates: 47°06′46″N 100°25′56″W
- Country: United States
- State: North Dakota
- County: Burleigh

Area
  - Total: 36.11 sq mi (93.52 km^{2})
  - Land: 36.11 sq mi (93.52 km^{2})
  - Water: 0 sq mi (0.00 km^{2})
- Elevation: 2,021 ft (616 m)

Population (2020)
  - Total: 17
  - Density: 0.47/sq mi (0.18/km^{2})
- Time zone: UTC-6 (Central (CST))
  - Summer (DST): UTC-5 (CDT)
- ZIP codes: 58477 (Regan); 58521 (Baldwin); 58494 (Wing)
- Area code: 701
- FIPS code: 38-67420
- GNIS feature ID: 1037144

Rock Hill Township is a township in Burleigh County, North Dakota, United States. The population was 17 at the 2020 census.

== Geography ==
Rock Hill Township has a total area of 36.110 square miles (93.52 km^{2}), all land.

=== Major highways ===
- ND 36

== Demographics ==
As of the 2023 American Community Survey, there was 1 estimated household.
