= Sterling Township, North Dakota =

Sterling Township
- Township
- Location within North Dakota
- Coordinates: 46°51′05″N 100°16′03″W
- Country: United States
- State: North Dakota
- County: Burleigh

Area
  - Total: 35.93 sq mi (93.06 km^{2})
  - Land: 35.93 sq mi (93.06 km^{2})
  - Water: 0 sq mi (0.00 km^{2})
- Elevation: 1,923 ft (586 m)

Population (2020)
  - Total: 160
  - Density: 4.5/sq mi (1.7/km^{2})
- Time zone: UTC-6 (Central (CST))
  - Summer (DST): UTC-5 (CDT)
- Area code: 701
- FIPS code: 38-75940
- GNIS feature ID: 1759347

Sterling Township is a township in Burleigh County, North Dakota, United States. The population was 160 at the 2020 census.

The unincorporated community of Sterling lies within Sterling Township.

== Geography ==
Sterling Township has a total area of 35.929 square miles (93.06 km^{2}), all land.

=== Major highways ===
- I-94
- US 83
- ND 14

== Demographics ==
As of the 2023 American Community Survey, there were an estimated 63 households.
