= Christiania Township, North Dakota =

- Township
- Location within North Dakota
- Coordinates: 46°56′17″N 100°15′57″W
- Country: United States
- State: North Dakota
- County: Burleigh

Area
  - Total: 36.00 sq mi (93.25 km^{2})
  - Land: 35.97 sq mi (93.15 km^{2})
  - Water: 0.039 sq mi (0.10 km^{2})
- Elevation: 1,906 ft (581 m)

Population (2020)
  - Total: 33
  - Density: 0.92/sq mi (0.35/km^{2})
- Time zone: UTC-6 (Central (CST))
  - Summer (DST): UTC-5 (CDT)
- ZIP codes: 58532 (Driscoll); 58572 (Sterling)
- Area code: 701
- FIPS code: 38-14060
- GNIS feature ID: 1759335

Christiania Township is a township in Burleigh County, North Dakota, United States. The population was 33 at the 2020 census.

== Geography ==
Christiania Township has a total area of 36.004 square miles (93.25 km^{2}), of which 35.966 square miles (93.15 km^{2}) is land and 0.038 square miles (0.098 km^{2}) is water.

=== Major highways ===
- ND 14

== Demographics ==
As of the 2023 American Community Survey, there were an estimated 5 households.
