= Ecklund Township, North Dakota =

- Township
- Location within North Dakota
- Coordinates: 47°06′49″N 100°43′04″W
- Country: United States
- State: North Dakota
- County: Burleigh

Area
  - Total: 53.94 sq mi (139.70 km^{2})
  - Land: 53.94 sq mi (139.70 km^{2})
  - Water: 0 sq mi (0.00 km^{2})
- Elevation: 2,185 ft (666 m)

Population (2020)
  - Total: 134
  - Density: 2.48/sq mi (0.959/km^{2})
- Time zone: UTC-6 (Central (CST))
  - Summer (DST): UTC-5 (CDT)
- ZIP code: 58521 (Baldwin); 58579 (Wilton)
- Area code: 701
- FIPS code: 38-21860
- GNIS feature ID: 1037134

Ecklund Township is a township in Burleigh County, North Dakota, United States. The population was 134 at the 2020 census.

== Geography ==
Ecklund Township has a total area of 53.938 square miles (139.70 km^{2}), all land.

=== Major highways ===
- US 83
- ND 36

== Demographics ==
As of the 2023 American Community Survey, there were an estimated 66 households.
