= Trygg Township, North Dakota =

- Township
- Location within North Dakota
- Coordinates: 47°01′33″N 100°25′55″W
- Country: United States
- State: North Dakota
- County: Burleigh

Area
  - Total: 36.03 sq mi (93.31 km^{2})
  - Land: 36.03 sq mi (93.31 km^{2})
  - Water: 0 sq mi (0.00 km^{2})
- Elevation: 2,041 ft (622 m)

Population (2020)
  - Total: 42
  - Density: 1.2/sq mi (0.45/km^{2})
- Time zone: UTC-6 (Central (CST))
  - Summer (DST): UTC-5 (CDT)
- ZIP codes: 58494 (Wing); 58521 (Baldwin); 58572 (Sterling)
- Area code: 701
- FIPS code: 38-79820
- GNIS feature ID: 1037132

Trygg Township is a township in Burleigh County, North Dakota, United States. The population was 42 at the 2020 census.

== Geography ==
Trygg Township has a total area of 36.028 square miles (93.31 km^{2}), all land.

== Demographics ==
As of the 2023 American Community Survey, there were an estimated 9 households.
