= Wing Township, North Dakota =

- Township
- Location within North Dakota
- Coordinates: 47°06′45″N 100°18′18″W
- Country: United States
- State: North Dakota
- County: Burleigh

Area
  - Total: 35.38 sq mi (91.64 km^{2})
  - Land: 35.37 sq mi (91.60 km^{2})
  - Water: 0.015 sq mi (0.04 km^{2})
- Elevation: 1,982 ft (604 m)

Population (2020)
  - Total: 19
  - Density: 0.54/sq mi (0.21/km^{2})
- Time zone: UTC-6 (Central (CST))
  - Summer (DST): UTC-5 (CDT)
- ZIP code: 58494 (Wing)
- Area code: 701
- FIPS code: 38-86820
- GNIS feature ID: 1037145

Wing Township is a township in Burleigh County, North Dakota, United States. The population was 19 at the 2020 census.

The city of Wing is entirely surrounded by Wing Township.

== Geography ==
Wing Township has a total area of 35.382 square miles (91.64 km^{2}), of which 35.367 square miles (91.60 km^{2}) is land and 0.015 square miles (0.039 km^{2}) is water.

=== Major highways ===
- ND 14
- ND 36

== Demographics ==
As of the 2023 American Community Survey, there were an estimated 14 households.
