= Harriet-Lien Township, North Dakota =

Harriet-Lein Township, North Dakota
- Township
- Location within North Dakota
- Coordinates: 47°04′08″N 100°10′41″W
- Country: United States
- State: North Dakota
- County: Burleigh

Area
  - Total: 71.97 sq mi (186.39 km^{2})
  - Land: 69.00 sq mi (178.70 km^{2})
  - Water: 2.97 sq mi (7.69 km^{2})
- Elevation: 1,985 ft (605 m)

Population (2020)
  - Total: 53
  - Density: 0.77/sq mi (0.30/km^{2})
- Time zone: UTC-6 (Central (CST))
  - Summer (DST): UTC-5 (CDT)
- Area code: 701
- FIPS code: 38-35670
- GNIS feature ID: 2397810

Harriet-Lein Township is a township in Burleigh County, North Dakota, United States. The population was 53 at the 2020 census.

The unincorporated community of Arena lies within Harriet-Lein Township.

== Geography ==
Harriet-Lein Township has a total area of 71.967 square miles (186.39 km^{2}), of which 68.998 square miles (178.70 km^{2}) is land and 2.969 square miles (7.69 km^{2}) is water.

=== Major highways ===
- ND 36

== Demographics ==
As of the 2023 American Community Survey, there were an estimated 18 households.
