= Richmond Township, North Dakota =

- Township
- Location within North Dakota
- Coordinates: 47°11′59″N 100°18′17″W
- Country: United States
- State: North Dakota
- County: Burleigh

Area
  - Total: 36.09 sq mi (93.47 km^{2})
  - Land: 35.00 sq mi (90.64 km^{2})
  - Water: 1.09 sq mi (2.83 km^{2})
- Elevation: 1,978 ft (603 m)

Population (2020)
  - Total: 31
  - Density: 0.89/sq mi (0.34/km^{2})
- Time zone: UTC-6 (Central (CST))
  - Summer (DST): UTC-5 (CDT)
- ZIP code: 58494 (Wing)
- Area code: 701
- FIPS code: 38-66635
- GNIS feature ID: 1759344

Richmond Township is a township in Burleigh County, North Dakota, United States. The population was 31 at the 2020 census.

== Geography ==
Richmond Township has a total area of 36.088 square miles (93.47 km^{2}), of which 34.997 square miles (90.64 km^{2}) is land and 1.091 square miles (2.83 km^{2}) is water.

=== Major highways ===
- ND 14

== Demographics ==
As of the 2023 American Community Survey, there were an estimated 13 households.
