= Menoken Township, North Dakota =

- Township
- Location within North Dakota
- Coordinates: 46°51′07″N 100°31′11″W
- Country: United States
- State: North Dakota
- County: Burleigh

Area
  - Total: 35.93 sq mi (93.05 km^{2})
  - Land: 35.87 sq mi (92.90 km^{2})
  - Water: 0.06 sq mi (0.16 km^{2})
- Elevation: 1,709 ft (521 m)

Population (2020)
  - Total: 177
  - Density: 4.93/sq mi (1.91/km^{2})
- Time zone: UTC-6 (Central (CST))
  - Summer (DST): UTC-5 (CDT)
- Area code: 701
- FIPS code: 38-52220
- GNIS feature ID: 1759340

Menoken Township is a township in Burleigh County, North Dakota, United States. The population was 177 at the 2020 census.

The census-designated place of Menoken is located on the southern edge of Menoken Township.

== Geography ==
Menoken Township has a total area of 35.928 square miles (93.05 km^{2}), of which 35.867 square miles (92.90 km^{2}) is land and 0.061 square miles (0.16 km^{2}) is water.

=== Major highways ===
- I-94
- US 83

== Demographics ==
As of the 2023 American Community Survey, there were an estimated 92 households.
