= Florence Lake, North Dakota =

- Unorganized territory
- Location within North Dakota
- Coordinates: 47°17′12″N 100°18′16″W
- Country: United States
- State: North Dakota
- County: Burleigh
- Dissolved: January 1, 2023

Area
  - Total: 34.96 sq mi (90.55 km^{2})
  - Land: 32.10 sq mi (83.15 km^{2})
  - Water: 2.86 sq mi (7.4 km^{2})

Population (2020)
  - Total: 6
  - Density: 0.19/sq mi (0.072/km^{2})
- Time zone: UTC-6 (Central (CST))
  - Summer (DST): UTC-5 (CDT)
- ZIP code: 58494 (Wing)
- Area code: 701
- FIPS code: 38-26860
- GNIS feature ID: 2831210

Florence Lake is an unorganized territory in Burleigh County, North Dakota, United States. The population was 6 at the 2020 census.

== History ==
Florence Lake was formerly a township, having officially dissolved on January 1, 2023.

== Geography ==
Florence Lake has a total area of 34.963 square miles (90.55 km^{2}), of which 32.103 square miles (83.15 km^{2}) is land and 2.86 square miles (7.4 km^{2}) is water.

=== Major highways ===
- ND 14

== Demographics ==
As of the 2023 American Community Survey, there was 1 estimated household.
