= Burnt Creek-Riverview, North Dakota =

- Unorganized territory
- Location within North Dakota
- Coordinates: 46°56′22″N 100°48′48″W
- Country: United States
- State: North Dakota
- County: Burleigh

Area
  - Total: 58.93 sq mi (152.62 km^{2})
  - Land: 58.01 sq mi (150.25 km^{2})
  - Water: 0.92 sq mi (2.37 km^{2})
- Elevation: 1,831 ft (558 m)

Population (2020)
  - Total: 2,568
  - Density: 44.27/sq mi (17.09/km^{2})
- Time zone: UTC-6 (Central (CST))
  - Summer (DST): UTC-5 (CDT)
- ZIP codes: 58503 (Bismarck); 58521 (Baldwin)
- Area code: 701
- FIPS code: 38-11045
- GNIS feature ID: 2393267

Burnt Creek-Riverview is an unorganized territory in Burleigh County, North Dakota, United States. The population was 2,568 at the 2020 census.

== Geography ==
Burnt Creek-Riverview has a total area of 58.926 square miles (152.62 km^{2}), of which 58.011 square miles (150.25 km^{2}) is land and 0.915 square miles (2.37 km^{2}) is water.

=== Major highways ===
- US 83

== Demographics ==
As of the 2023 American Community Survey, there were an estimated 887 households.
