= Lyman, North Dakota =

- Unorganized territory
- Location within North Dakota
- Coordinates: 47°01′32″N 100°18′18″W
- Country: United States
- State: North Dakota
- County: Burleigh

Area
  - Total: 36.14 sq mi (93.59 km^{2})
  - Land: 35.97 sq mi (93.16 km^{2})
  - Water: 0.16 sq mi (0.42 km^{2})

Population (2020)
  - Total: 25
  - Density: 0.70/sq mi (0.27/km^{2})
- Time zone: UTC-6 (Central (CST))
  - Summer (DST): UTC-5 (CDT)
- ZIP code: 58494 (Wing)
- Area code: 701
- FIPS code: 38-48620
- GNIS feature ID: 1036139

Lyman is an unorganized territory in Burleigh County, North Dakota, United States. The population was 25 at the 2020 census.

== Geography ==
Lyman has a total area of 36.134 square miles (93.59 km^{2}), of which 35.971 square miles (93.16 km^{2}) is land and 0.163 square miles (0.42 km^{2}) is water.

=== Major highways ===
- ND 14

== Demographics ==
As of the 2023 American Community Survey, there was 1 estimated household.
