= Moffit, North Dakota =

- Unincorporated community
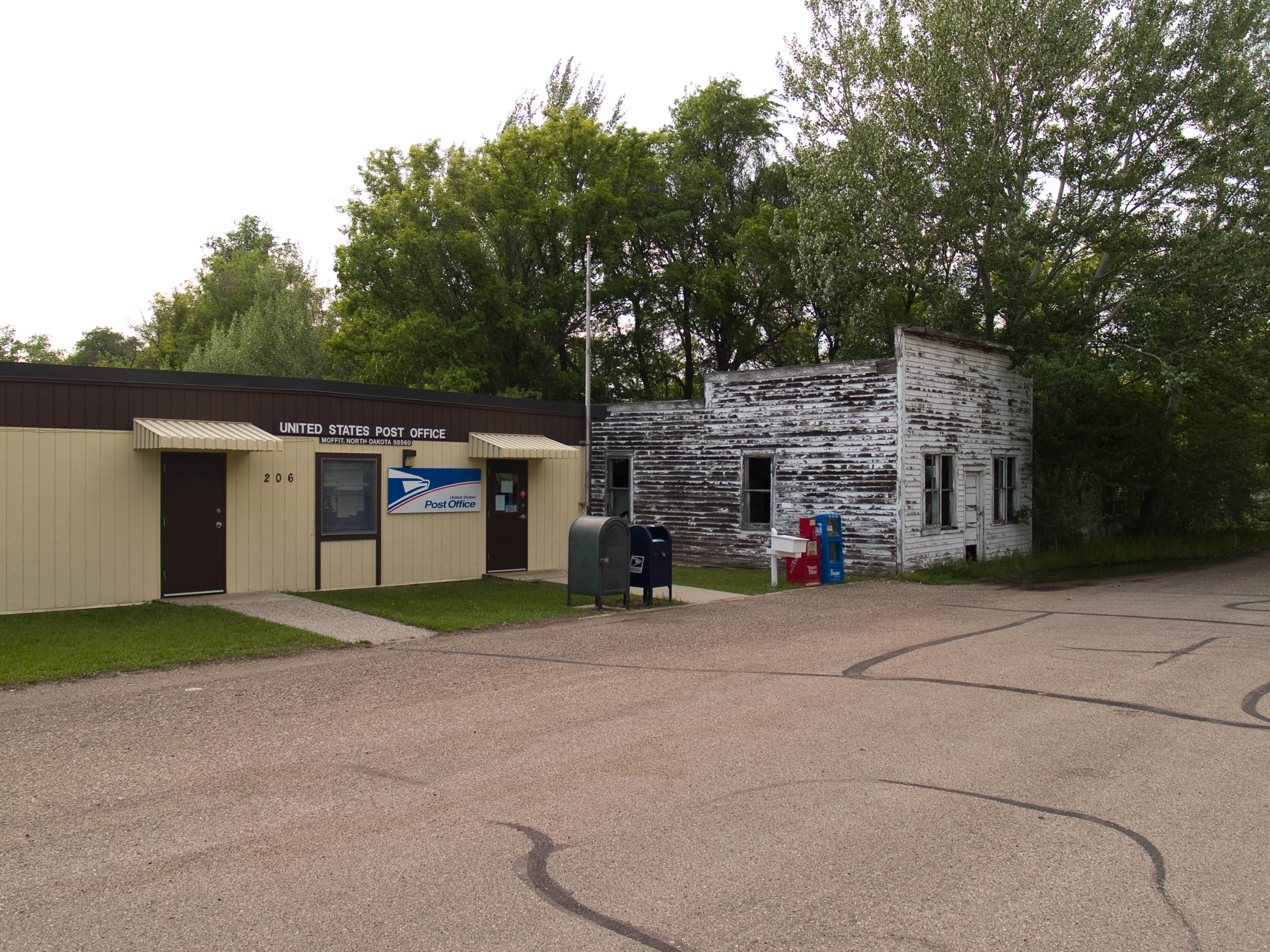

- Location within North Dakota Location within the United States
- Coordinates: 46°40′38″N 100°17′28″W
- Country: United States
- State: North Dakota
- County: Burleigh
- Township: Long Lake
- Elevation: 1,759 ft (536 m)
- Time zone: UTC-6 (Central (CST))
  - Summer (DST): UTC-5 (CDT)
- ZIP codes: 58560
- Area code: 701
- GNIS feature ID: 1030264

Moffit is an unincorporated community in Burleigh County, North Dakota, United States. It lies along US 83, 10 miles south of Sterling.

The post office at Moffit has been in operation since 1906. The community's name honors a family of settlers.
