= Hay Creek Township =

Hay Creek Township may refer to the following townships in the United States:

- Hay Creek Township, Goodhue County, Minnesota
- Hay Creek Township, Burleigh County, North Dakota
