= Painted Woods Township, North Dakota =

- Township
- Location within North Dakota
- Coordinates: 47°06′49″N 100°52′33″W
- Country: United States
- State: North Dakota
- County: Burleigh

Area
  - Total: 37.68 sq mi (97.60 km^{2})
  - Land: 36.34 sq mi (94.12 km^{2})
  - Water: 1.34 sq mi (3.48 km^{2})
- Elevation: 1,847 ft (563 m)

Population (2020)
  - Total: 114
  - Density: 3.14/sq mi (1.21/km^{2})
- Time zone: UTC-6 (Central (CST))
  - Summer (DST): UTC-5 (CDT)
- Area code: 701
- FIPS code: 38-60580
- GNIS feature ID: 1759343

Painted Woods Township is a township in Burleigh County, North Dakota, United States. The population was 114 at the 2020 census.

== Geography ==
Painted Woods Township has a total area of 37.684 square miles (97.60 km^{2}), of which 36.339 square miles (94.12 km^{2}) is land and 1.345 square miles (3.48 km^{2}) is water.

=== Major highways ===
- ND 1804

== Demographics ==
As of the 2023 American Community Survey, there were an estimated 41 households.
