= Phoenix, North Dakota =

- Unorganized territory
- Location within North Dakota
- Coordinates: 47°11′57″N 100°10′39″W
- Country: United States
- State: North Dakota
- County: Burleigh

Area
  - Total: 35.98 sq mi (93.19 km^{2})
  - Land: 34.87 sq mi (90.31 km^{2})
  - Water: 1.11 sq mi (2.88 km^{2})
- Elevation: 1,933 ft (589 m)

Population (2020)
  - Total: 9
  - Density: 0.26/sq mi (0.10/km^{2})
- Time zone: UTC-6 (Central (CST))
  - Summer (DST): UTC-5 (CDT)
- ZIP code: 58494 (Wing)
- Area code: 701
- FIPS code: 38-62160
- GNIS feature ID: 2393306

Phoenix is an unorganized territory in Burleigh County, North Dakota, United States. The population was 9 at the 2020 census.

== Geography ==
Phoenix has a total area of 35.979 square miles (93.19 km^{2}), of which 34.868 square miles (90.31 km^{2}) is land and 1.111 square miles (2.88 km^{2}) is water.

== Demographics ==
As of the 2023 American Community Survey, there were an estimated 5 households.
