= Plug-in electric vehicles in North Dakota =

As of June 2021, there were 266 electric vehicles (not including plug-in hybrid vehicles) registered in North Dakota. As of 2022, 0.44% of all new light-duty vehicles sold in the state were electric.

In 2022, North Dakota was ranked by Forbes Advisor as the best state in the United States for electric vehicle charging, due to the low numbers of EVs (~3) per charging station.

== Government policy ==
As of 2022, the state government does not offer any tax incentives for electric vehicle purchases.

== Charging stations ==
As of April 2022, there were 58 public charging stations in North Dakota.

The Infrastructure Investment and Jobs Act, signed into law in November 2021, allocates US$26 million to charging stations in North Dakota.

As of 2022, the state government recognizes I-29 and I-94 as "alternative fuel corridors" with plans for charging stations to be built every 50 miles (80 km).

== By region ==
=== Bismarck–Mandan ===
As of March 2022, there were two public charging stations in the Bismarck–Mandan metropolitan area.

=== Fargo ===
As of 2019, there were around 20 public charging stations in Fargo.
