= Sibley Butte Township, North Dakota =

- Township
- Location within North Dakota
- Coordinates: 46°56′19″N 100°23′32″W
- Country: United States
- State: North Dakota
- County: Burleigh

Area
  - Total: 36.00 sq mi (93.24 km^{2})
  - Land: 35.99 sq mi (93.21 km^{2})
  - Water: 0.011 sq mi (0.028 km^{2})
- Elevation: 1,896 ft (578 m)

Population (2020)
  - Total: 9
  - Density: 0.25/sq mi (0.097/km^{2})
- Time zone: UTC-6 (Central (CST))
  - Summer (DST): UTC-5 (CDT)
- ZIP code: 58572 (Sterling)
- Area code: 701
- FIPS code: 38-72900
- GNIS feature ID: 1759346

Sibley Butte Township is a township in Burleigh County, North Dakota, United States. The population was 9 at the 2020 census.

== Geography ==
Sibley Butte Township has a total area of 36.001 square miles (93.24 km^{2}), of which 35.990 square miles (93.21 km^{2}) is land and 0.011 square miles (0.028 km^{2}) is water.

== Demographics ==
As of the 2023 American Community Survey, there were an estimated 8 households.
