= Missouri Township, North Dakota =

- Township
- Location within North Dakota
- Coordinates: 46°41′06″N 100°38′34″W
- Country: United States
- State: North Dakota
- County: Burleigh

Area
  - Total: 29.36 sq mi (76.03 km^{2})
  - Land: 23.63 sq mi (61.21 km^{2})
  - Water: 5.72 sq mi (14.82 km^{2})
- Elevation: 1,740 ft (530 m)

Population (2020)
  - Total: 132
  - Density: 5.59/sq mi (2.16/km^{2})
- Time zone: UTC-6 (Central (CST))
  - Summer (DST): UTC-5 (CDT)
- Area code: 701
- FIPS code: 38-53620
- GNIS feature ID: 1759341

Missouri Township is a township in Burleigh County, North Dakota, United States. The population was 132 at the 2020 census.

== Geography ==
Missouri Township has a total area of 29.357 square miles (76.03 km^{2}), of which 23.634 square miles (61.21 km^{2}) (80.51%) is land and 5.723 square miles (14.82 km^{2}) (19.49%) is water.

=== Major highways ===
- ND 1804

== Demographics ==
As of the 2023 American Community Survey, there were an estimated 78 households.
