= Florence Lake National Wildlife Refuge =

Protected area in North Dakota, United States

- IUCN category IV (habitat/species management area)
- Location within North Dakota
- Location: Burleigh County, North Dakota, United States
- Nearest city: Wing, North Dakota
- Coordinates: 47.2936°N 100.31428°W
- Area: 1,888 acres (7.64 km^{2})
- Established: 1939
- Governing body: U.S. Fish and Wildlife Service
- Website: Florence Lake National Wildlife Refuge

The 1,888-acre (7.64 km^{2}) Florence Lake National Wildlife Refuge, in Burleigh County, North Dakota, United States, has almost 1,000 acres (4.0 km^{2}) of virgin native mixed-grass prairie and a 132-acre (0.53 km^{2}) lake. This high quality prairie habitat attracts grassland birds including grassland passerines that are sought by birders visiting the region. Florence Lake National Wildlife Refuge is administered by Long Lake National Wildlife Refuge as an unstaffed satellite refuge.
