= Hazel Grove Township, North Dakota =

- Township
- Location within North Dakota
- Coordinates: 47°17′10″N 100°10′39″W
- Country: United States
- State: North Dakota
- County: Burleigh

Area
  - Total: 34.95 sq mi (90.52 km^{2})
  - Land: 34.13 sq mi (88.39 km^{2})
  - Water: 0.82 sq mi (2.13 km^{2})
- Elevation: 2,018 ft (615 m)

Population (2020)
  - Total: 18
  - Density: 0.53/sq mi (0.20/km^{2})
- Time zone: UTC-6 (Central (CST))
  - Summer (DST): UTC-5 (CDT)
- ZIP code: 58494 (Wing)
- Area code: 701
- FIPS code: 38-36660
- GNIS feature ID: 1037156

Hazel Grove Township is a township in Burleigh County, North Dakota, United States. The population was 18 at the 2020 census.

== Geography ==
Hazel Grove Township has a total area of 34.950 square miles (90.52 km^{2}), of which 34.128 square miles (88.39 km^{2}) is land and 0.822 square miles (2.13 km^{2}) is water.

== Demographics ==
As of the 2023 American Community Survey, there were an estimated 5 households.
