= Driscoll Township, North Dakota =

- Township
- Location within North Dakota
- Coordinates: 46°51′03″N 100°08′27″W
- Country: United States
- State: North Dakota
- County: Burleigh

Area
  - Total: 36.05 sq mi (93.37 km^{2})
  - Land: 35.93 sq mi (93.05 km^{2})
  - Water: 0.12 sq mi (0.32 km^{2})
- Elevation: 1,854 ft (565 m)

Population (2020)
  - Total: 150
  - Density: 4.2/sq mi (1.6/km^{2})
- Time zone: UTC-6 (Central (CST))
  - Summer (DST): UTC-5 (CDT)
- ZIP codes: 58532 (Driscoll); 58572 (Sterling)
- Area code: 701
- FIPS code: 38-20540
- GNIS feature ID: 1037072

Driscoll Township is a township in Burleigh County, North Dakota, United States. The population was 150 at the 2020 census.

The census-designated place of Driscoll lies within Driscoll Township.

== Geography ==
Driscoll Township has a total area of 36.050 square miles (93.37 km^{2}), of which 35.925 square miles (93.05 km^{2}) is land and 0.125 square miles (0.32 km^{2}) is water.

=== Major highways ===
- I-94

== Demographics ==
As of the 2023 American Community Survey, there were an estimated 74 households.
