= Thelma Township, North Dakota =

- Township
- Location within North Dakota
- Coordinates: 46°40′50″N 100°08′32″W
- Country: United States
- State: North Dakota
- County: Burleigh

Area
  - Total: 36.12 sq mi (93.55 km^{2})
  - Land: 34.17 sq mi (88.51 km^{2})
  - Water: 1.95 sq mi (5.05 km^{2})
- Elevation: 1,844 ft (562 m)

Population (2020)
  - Total: 31
  - Density: 0.91/sq mi (0.35/km^{2})
- Time zone: UTC-6 (Central (CST))
  - Summer (DST): UTC-5 (CDT)
- ZIP code: 58532 (Driscoll)
- Area code: 701
- FIPS code: 38-78580
- GNIS feature ID: 1037070

Thelma Township is a township in Burleigh County, North Dakota, United States. The population was 31 at the 2020 census.

== Geography ==
Thelma Township has a total area of 36.120 square miles (93.55 km^{2}), of which 34.172 square miles (88.51 km^{2}) is land and 1.948 square miles (5.05 km^{2}) is water.

== Demographics ==
As of the 2023 American Community Survey, there were an estimated 5 households.
