= Lincoln-Fort Rice, North Dakota =

- Unorganized territory
- Location within North Dakota
- Coordinates: 46°43′21″N 100°44′37″W
- Country: United States
- State: North Dakota
- County: Burleigh

Area
  - Total: 28.13 sq mi (72.86 km^{2})
  - Land: 25.88 sq mi (67.03 km^{2})
  - Water: 2.25 sq mi (5.82 km^{2})
- Elevation: 1,654 ft (504 m)

Population (2020)
  - Total: 4,466
  - Density: 172.6/sq mi (66.63/km^{2})
- Time zone: UTC-6 (Central (CST))
  - Summer (DST): UTC-5 (CDT)
- ZIP code: 58501, 58504 (Bismarck)
- Area code: 701
- FIPS code: 38-46710
- GNIS feature ID: 2393292

Lincoln-Fort Rice is a township in Burleigh County, North Dakota, United States. The population was 4,466 at the 2020 census.

== Geography ==
Lincoln-Fort Rice has a total area of 28.130 square miles (72.86 km^{2}), of which 25.881 square miles (67.03 km^{2}) is land and 2.249 square miles (5.82 km^{2}) is water.

=== Major highways ===
- ND 1804

== Demographics ==
As of the 2023 American Community Survey, there were an estimated 1,155 households.

== Education ==
University of Mary, a private Benedictine university, is located in Lincoln-Fort Rice.
