= Long Lake Township =

Long Lake Township may refer to the following townships in the United States:

- Long Lake Township, Grand Traverse County, Michigan
- Long Lake Township, Crow Wing County, Minnesota
- Long Lake Township, Watonwan County, Minnesota
- Long Lake Township, Burleigh County, North Dakota

== See also ==
- Long Lake (disambiguation)
