= Cromwell Township, North Dakota =

- Township
- Location within North Dakota
- Coordinates: 47°01′34″N 100°33′32″W
- Country: United States
- State: North Dakota
- County: Burleigh

Area
  - Total: 36.21 sq mi (93.78 km^{2})
  - Land: 36.21 sq mi (93.78 km^{2})
  - Water: 0 sq mi (0.00 km^{2})
- Elevation: 1,913 ft (583 m)

Population (2020)
  - Total: 32
  - Density: 0.88/sq mi (0.34/km^{2})
- Time zone: UTC-6 (Central (CST))
  - Summer (DST): UTC-5 (CDT)
- ZIP code: 58521 (Baldwin)
- Area code: 701
- FIPS code: 38-16900
- GNIS feature ID: 1037133

Cromwell Township is a township in Burleigh County, North Dakota, United States. The population was 32 at the 2020 census.

== Geography ==
Cromwell Township has a total area of 36.208 square miles (93.78 km^{2}), all land.

== Demographics ==
As of the 2023 American Community Survey, there were an estimated 11 households.
