= Hay Creek Township, North Dakota =

Civil township in North Dakota, U.S.

- Township
- Location within North Dakota
- Coordinates: 46°53′00″N 100°43′56″W
- Country: United States
- State: North Dakota
- County: Burleigh

Area
  - Total: 24.88 sq mi (64.43 km^{2})
  - Land: 24.14 sq mi (62.51 km^{2})
  - Water: 0.74 sq mi (1.92 km^{2})
- Elevation: 1,919 ft (585 m)

Population
  - Total: 4,293
  - Density: 177.9/sq mi (68.68/km^{2})
- Area code: 701
- FIPS code: 38-36460
- GNIS feature ID: 1037123
- Website: haycreektownshipnd.org

Hay Creek Township is a civil township in Burleigh County in the U.S. state of North Dakota. As of the 2020 census, its population was 4,293.

The township is part of the Bismarck-Mandan metropolitan area.

== History ==
A small rural community with the name Hay Creek sprang up in this township in the 1890s. Since that time, the city of Bismarck has absorbed much of the township, including the remnants of the community of Hay Creek.

== Geography ==
Hay Creek Township has a total area of 24.876 square miles (64.43 km^{2}), of which 24.134 square miles (62.51 km^{2}) is land and 0.742 square miles (1.92 km^{2}) is water.

=== Major highways ===
- US 83
- ND 1804

== Demographics ==
As of the 2023 American Community Survey, there were an estimated 1,500 households.

Historical population
Census	Pop.	Note	%±
2010	4,057		—
2020	4,293		5.8%
U.S. Decennial Census
