= Telfer Township, North Dakota =

Telfer Township
- Township
- Location within North Dakota
- Coordinates: 46°40′41″N 100°31′19″W
- Country: United States
- State: North Dakota
- County: Burleigh

Area
  - Total: 36.05 sq mi (93.36 km^{2})
  - Land: 35.98 sq mi (93.20 km^{2})
  - Water: 0.062 sq mi (0.16 km^{2})
- Elevation: 1,801 ft (549 m)

Population (2020)
  - Total: 124
  - Density: 3.45/sq mi (1.33/km^{2})
- Time zone: UTC-6 (Central (CST))
  - Summer (DST): UTC-5 (CDT)
- Area code: 701
- FIPS code: 38-78300
- GNIS feature ID: 1759348

Telfer Township is a township in Burleigh County, North Dakota, United States. The population was 124 at the 2020 census.

== Geography ==
Telfer Township has a total area of 36.046 square miles (93.36 km^{2}), of which 35.984 square miles (93.20 km^{2}) is land and 0.062 square miles (0.16 km^{2}) is water.

=== Major highways ===
- ND 1804

== Demographics ==
As of the 2023 American Community Survey, there were an estimated 39 households.
