= Wilton School District =

Wilton School District or Wilton Public Schools may refer to:

- Wilton School District in Connecticut: See Wilton, Connecticut
- Wilton School District (North Dakota)
