= Crofte Township, North Dakota =

- Township
- Location within North Dakota
- Coordinates: 47°01′35″N 100°41′09″W
- Country: United States
- State: North Dakota
- County: Burleigh

Area
  - Total: 36.16 sq mi (93.66 km^{2})
  - Land: 36.16 sq mi (93.66 km^{2})
  - Water: 0 sq mi (0.00 km^{2})
- Elevation: 2,064 ft (629 m)

Population (2020)
  - Total: 133
  - Density: 3.68/sq mi (1.42/km^{2})
- Time zone: UTC-6 (Central (CST))
  - Summer (DST): UTC-5 (CDT)
- ZIP code: 58521 (Baldwin)
- Area code: 701
- FIPS code: 38-16860
- GNIS feature ID: 1037131

Crofte Township is a township in Burleigh County, North Dakota, United States. The population was 133 at the 2020 census.

A portion of the unincorporated community of Baldwin lies within Crofte Township.

== Geography ==
Crofte Township has a total area of 36.163 square miles (93.66 km^{2}), all land.

== Demographics ==
As of the 2023 American Community Survey, there were an estimated 75 households.
