= Taft Township, North Dakota =

Taft Township
- Township
- Location within North Dakota
- Coordinates: 46°45′52″N 100°16′07″W
- Country: United States
- State: North Dakota
- County: Burleigh

Area
  - Total: 35.95 sq mi (93.11 km^{2})
  - Land: 35.81 sq mi (92.74 km^{2})
  - Water: 0.14 sq mi (0.37 km^{2})
- Elevation: 1,818 ft (554 m)

Population (2020)
  - Total: 48
  - Density: 1.3/sq mi (0.52/km^{2})
- Time zone: UTC-6 (Central (CST))
  - Summer (DST): UTC-5 (CDT)
- Area code: 701
- FIPS code: 38-77780
- GNIS feature ID: 1037068

Taft Township is a township in Burleigh County, North Dakota, United States. The population was 48 at the 2020 census.

== Geography ==
Taft Township has a total area of 35.951 square miles (93.11 km^{2}), of which 35.809 square miles (92.74 km^{2}) is land and 0.142 square miles (0.37 km^{2}) is water.

=== Major highways ===
- US 83

== Demographics ==
As of the 2023 American Community Survey, there were an estimated 25 households.
