= Apple Creek Township, North Dakota =

- Township
- Motto: Rural living, close to the city.
- Interactive map of Apple Creek Township, North Dakota
- Location within North Dakota
- Coordinates: 46.7496°N 100.6339°W
- Country: United States
- State: North Dakota
- County: Burleigh

Area
  - Total: 33.467 sq mi (86.679 km^{2})
  - Land: 33.421 sq mi (86.559 km^{2})
  - Water: 0.047 sq mi (0.122 km^{2}) 0.14%
- Elevation: 1,808 ft (551 m)

Population (2020)
  - Total: 3,452
  - Estimate (2025): 3,515
  - Density: 103.3/sq mi (39.88/km^{2})
- Time zone: UTC–6 (Central (CST))
  - Summer (DST): UTC–5 (CDT)
- ZIP Codes: 58501 (Bismarck); 58504 (Bismarck/Lincoln); 58558 (Menoken)
- Area code: 701
- FIPS code: 38-02780
- GNIS feature ID: 1759333
- Website: applecreektownship.org

Apple Creek Township is a township in Burleigh County, North Dakota, United States. The population was 3,452 as of the 2020 census, and was estimated at 3,515 in 2025.

== Geography ==
According to the United States Census Bureau, the township has a total area of 33.467 square miles (86.68 km^{2}), of which 33.420 square miles (86.56 km^{2}) is land and 0.047 square miles (0.12 km^{2}) (0.14%) is water.

== Demographics ==
Historical population
Census	Pop.	Note	%±
1960	262		—
1970	270		3.1%
1980	843		212.2%
1990	1,039		23.3%
2000	1,243		19.6%
2010	2,652		113.4%
2020	3,452		30.2%
2025 (est.)	3,515		1.8%
U.S. Decennial Census; 2020 Census

As of the 2024 American Community Survey, there were 1,140 estimated households in Apple Creek Township with an average of 3.06 persons per household. The township has a median household income of $156,615. Approximately 2.2% of the township's population lives at or below the poverty line. Apple Creek Township has an estimated 77.7% employment rate, with 45.4% of the population holding a bachelor's degree or higher and 98.5% holding a high school diploma. There were 1,157 housing units at an average density of 34.62 per square mile (13.4/km^{2}).

The top five reported languages (people were allowed to report up to two languages, thus the figures will generally add to more than 100%) were English (98.8%), Spanish (1.1%), Indo-European (0.0%), Asian and Pacific Islander (0.0%), and Other (0.0%).

The median age in the township was 38.2 years.

=== 2020 census ===
As of the 2020 census, there were 3,452 people, 1,145 households, and 948 families residing in the township. The population density was 100.41 inhabitants per square mile (38.8/km^{2}). There were 1,170 housing units at an average density of 34.03 per square mile (13.1/km^{2}). The racial makeup of the township was 94.24% White, 0.12% African American, 1.83% Native American, 0.17% Asian, 0.00% Pacific Islander, 0.52% from some other races and 3.13% from two or more races. Hispanic or Latino people of any race were 1.10% of the population.
