= Ghylin Township, North Dakota =

- Township
- Location within North Dakota
- Coordinates: 47°06′47″N 100°33′32″W
- Country: United States
- State: North Dakota
- County: Burleigh

Area
  - Total: 35.64 sq mi (92.32 km^{2})
  - Land: 35.64 sq mi (92.32 km^{2})
  - Water: 0 sq mi (0.00 km^{2})
- Elevation: 2,116 ft (645 m)

Population (2020)
  - Total: 36
  - Density: 1.0/sq mi (0.39/km^{2})
- Time zone: UTC-6 (Central (CST))
  - Summer (DST): UTC-5 (CDT)
- Area code: 701
- FIPS code: 38-30100
- GNIS feature ID: 1037191

Ghylin Township is a township in Burleigh County, North Dakota, United States. The population was 36 at the 2020 census.

== Geography ==
Ghylin Township has a total area of 35.645 square miles (92.32 km^{2}), all land.

=== Major highways ===
- ND 36

== Demographics ==
As of the 2023 American Community Survey, there were an estimated 16 households.
