= Francis Township, North Dakota =

- Township
- Location within North Dakota
- Coordinates: 46°56′20″N 100°31′07″W
- Country: United States
- State: North Dakota
- County: Burleigh

Area
  - Total: 35.83 sq mi (92.81 km^{2})
  - Land: 35.83 sq mi (92.81 km^{2})
  - Water: 0 sq mi (0.00 km^{2})
- Elevation: 1,946 ft (593 m)

Population (2020)
  - Total: 17
  - Density: 0.47/sq mi (0.18/km^{2})
- Time zone: UTC-6 (Central (CST))
  - Summer (DST): UTC-5 (CDT)
- Area code: 701
- FIPS code: 38-28100
- GNIS feature ID: 1759337

Francis Township is a township in Burleigh County, North Dakota, United States. The population was 17 at the 2020 census.

== Geography ==
Francis Township has a total area of 35.833 square miles (92.81 km^{2}), all land.

== Demographics ==
As of the 2023 American Community Survey, there were an estimated 13 households.
