= Morton Township, North Dakota =

- Township
- Location within North Dakota
- Coordinates: 46°40′40″N 100°23′45″W
- Country: United States
- State: North Dakota
- County: Burleigh

Area
  - Total: 35.98 sq mi (93.20 km^{2})
  - Land: 35.97 sq mi (93.17 km^{2})
  - Water: 0.011 sq mi (0.028 km^{2})
- Elevation: 1,965 ft (599 m)

Population (2020)
  - Total: 55
  - Density: 1.5/sq mi (0.59/km^{2})
- Time zone: UTC-6 (Central (CST))
  - Summer (DST): UTC-5 (CDT)
- Area code: 701
- FIPS code: 38-54460
- GNIS feature ID: 1759342

Morton Township is a township in Burleigh County, North Dakota, United States. The population was 55 at the 2020 census.

The unincorporated community of Brittin lies within Morton Township.

== Geography ==
Morton Township has a total area of 35.986 square miles (93.20 km^{2}), of which 35.975 square miles (93.17 km^{2}) is land and 0.011 square miles (0.028 km^{2}) is water.

== Demographics ==
As of the 2023 American Community Survey, there were an estimated 40 households.
