= Burleigh County, North Dakota =

County in North Dakota, United States

- County
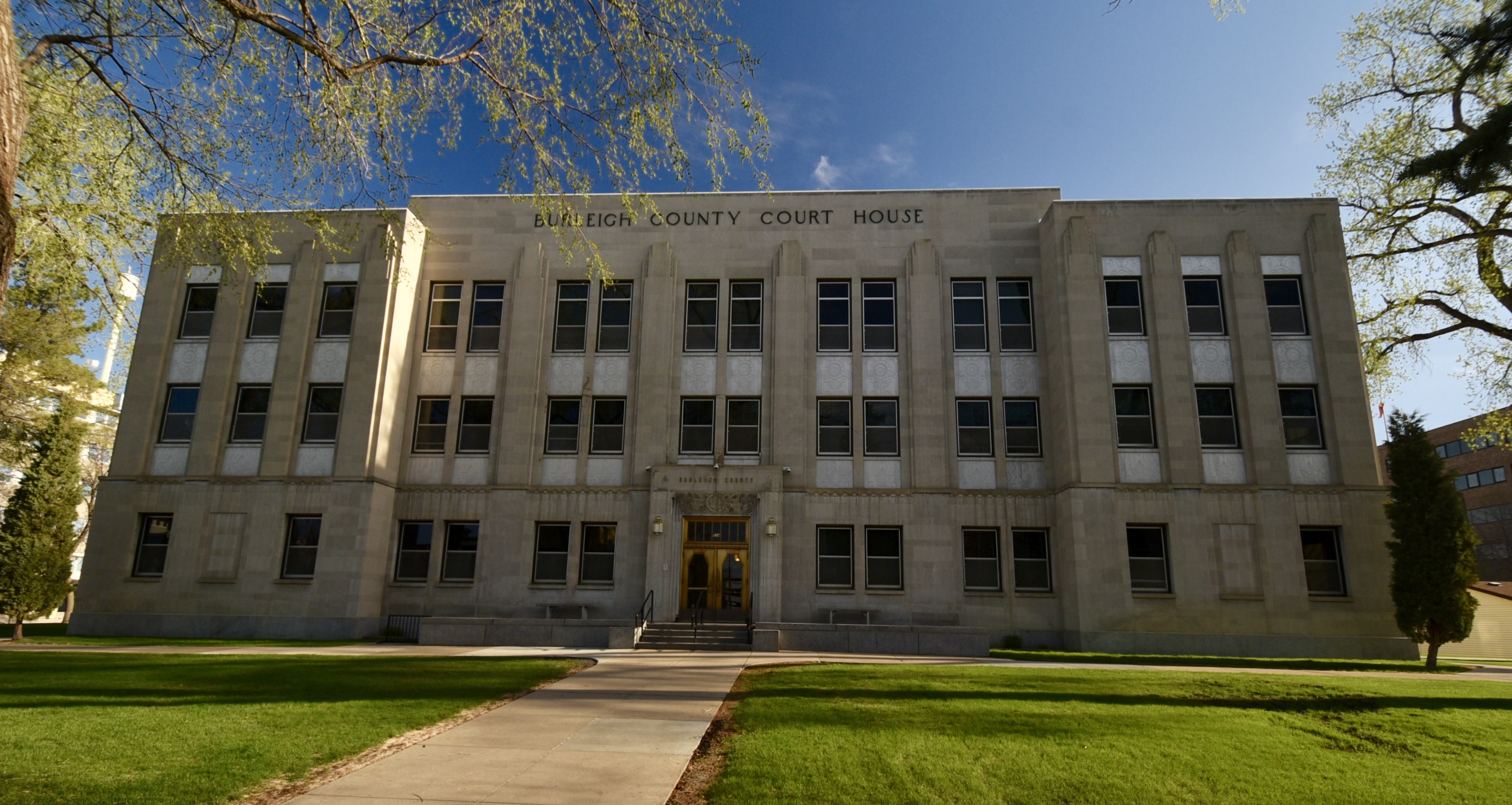
- The Burleigh County Courthouse in Bismarck

- Seal

- Location within the U.S. state of North Dakota
- Coordinates: 46.9788°N 100.4695°W
- Country: United States
- State: North Dakota
- Created: January 4, 1873
- Organized: July 16, 1873
- Named for: Walter A. Burleigh
- Seat: Bismarck
- Largest city: Bismarck

Area
  - Total: 1,668.482 sq mi (4,321.35 km^{2})
  - Land: 1,632.694 sq mi (4,228.66 km^{2})
  - Water: 35.788 sq mi (92.69 km^{2}) 2.14%

Population (2020)
  - Total: 98,458
  - Estimate (2025): 103,251 ▲
  - Density: 60.304/sq mi (23.284/km^{2})
- Time zone: UTC−6 (Central)
  - Summer (DST): UTC−5 (CDT)
- Area code: 701
- Congressional district: At-large
- Website: burleigh.gov

Burleigh County is a county in the U.S. state of North Dakota. As of the 2020 census, the population was 98,458, and was estimated to be 103,251 in 2025, making it the second-most populous county in North Dakota. The county seat and the largest city is Bismarck, the state capital and second-largest city in North Dakota. The county was named for Dakota Territory political figure Walter A. Burleigh.

Burleigh County is included in the Bismarck metropolitan area.

== History ==
Burleigh County was created on January 4, 1873, by the Dakota Territory legislature, annexing territory from Buffalo County. Burleigh was not organized at the time, but the organization began on July 16, 1873. Its boundaries were altered in 1879, 1881, 1883, and twice in 1885.

== Geography ==
The Missouri River flows south-southeasterly along the lower west boundary line of Burleigh County. The central part of the county is drained by south-flowing creeks. The county terrain consists of semi-arid low rolling hills, partially devoted to agriculture. The terrain slopes to the south, and its western portion also slopes to the river valley. The terrain's highest point is on the upper portion of the east boundary line, at 2,060 ft (630 m) ASL.

According to the United States Census Bureau, the county has a total area of 1,668.482 square miles (4,321.35 km^{2}), of which 1,632.694 square miles (4,228.66 km^{2}) is land and 35.788 square miles (92.69 km^{2}) (2.14%) is water. It is the 13th largest county in North Dakota by total area.

=== Major highways ===
- I-94
- US 83
- ND 14
- ND 36
- ND 41
- ND 1804

=== Transit ===
- Bis-Man Transit (Capital Area Transit)
- Jefferson Lines

=== Adjacent counties ===
- Sheridan County – north
- Kidder County – east
- Emmons County – south
- Morton County – southwest
- Oliver County – west
- McLean County – northwest

=== Protected areas ===
- Arena State Game Management Area
- Bunker Lake State Game Management Area
- Canfield Lake National Wildlife Refuge
- Florence Lake National Wildlife Refuge
- Long Lake National Wildlife Refuge (part)
- Sibley Nature Park
- Wilton Mine State Game Management Area (part)

=== Lakes ===
- Bunce Lake
- Bunker Lake
- Clear Lake
- Florence Lake
- Grass Lake
- Harriet Lake
- Horseshoe Lake
- Lonetree Lake
- Long Lake
- Mitchell Lake
- New Johns Lake (part)
- O'Brien Lake
- Pelican Lake
- Rice Lake

== Demographics ==
Historical population
Census	Pop.	Note	%±
1880	3,246		—
1890	4,247		30.8%
1900	6,081		43.2%
1910	13,087		115.2%
1920	15,578		19.0%
1930	19,769		26.9%
1940	22,736		15.0%
1950	25,673		12.9%
1960	34,016		32.5%
1970	40,714		19.7%
1980	54,811		34.6%
1990	60,131		9.7%
2000	69,416		15.4%
2010	81,308		17.1%
2020	98,458		21.1%
2025 (est.)	103,251	▲	4.9%
U.S. Decennial Census; 1790–1960 1900–1990; 1990–2000 2010–2020

As of the third quarter of 2025, the median home value in Burleigh County was $338,255.

As of the 2024 American Community Survey, there are 42,881 estimated households in Burleigh County with an average of 2.31 persons per household. The county has a median household income of $88,701. Approximately 7.5% of the county's population lives at or below the poverty line. Burleigh County has an estimated 66.7% employment rate, with 42.4% of the population holding a bachelor's degree or higher and 94.8% holding a high school diploma. There were 44,541 housing units at an average density of 27.28 per square mile (10.5/km^{2}).

The median age in the county was 39.7 years.

Burleigh County, North Dakota – racial and ethnic composition Note: the US Census treats Hispanic/Latino as an ethnic category. This table excludes Latinos from the racial categories and assigns them to a separate category. Hispanics/Latinos may be of any race.
Race / ethnicity (NH = non-Hispanic)	Pop. 1980	Pop. 1990	Pop. 2000	Pop. 2010	Pop. 2020	Pop. 2024
White alone (NH)	53,249 (97.15%)	57,919 (96.32%)	65,686 (94.63%)	75,054 (92.31%)	84,349 (85.67%)	88,204 (85.55%)
Black or African American alone (NH)	46 (0.08%)	66 (0.11%)	166 (0.24%)	476 (0.59%)	2,227 (2.26%)	2,446 (2.37%)
Native American or Alaska Native alone (NH)	1,028 (1.88%)	1,552 (2.58%)	2,236 (3.22%)	3,284 (4.04%)	4,053 (4.12%)	4,402 (4.27%)
Asian alone (NH)	193 (0.35%)	214 (0.36%)	271 (0.39%)	386 (0.47%)	1,043 (1.06%)	1,284 (1.25%)
Pacific Islander alone (NH)	—	—	18 (0.03%)	26 (0.03%)	316 (0.32%)	1,040 (1.01%)
Other race alone (NH)	92 (0.17%)	19 (0.03%)	21 (0.03%)	54 (0.07%)	210 (0.21%)	—
Mixed race or multiracial (NH)	—	—	550 (0.79%)	1,042 (1.28%)	3,176 (3.23%)	2,090 (2.03%)
Hispanic or Latino (any race)	203 (0.37%)	361 (0.60%)	468 (0.67%)	986 (1.21%)	3,084 (3.13%)	3,641 (3.53%)
Total	54,811 (100.00%)	60,131 (100.00%)	69,416 (100.00%)	81,308 (100.00%)	98,458 (100.00%)	103,251 (100.00%)

=== 2024 estimate ===
As of the 2024 estimate, there were 103,107 people, 42,881 households, and _ families residing in the county. The population density was 63.15 inhabitants per square mile (24.4/km^{2}). There were 44,541 housing units at an average density of 27.28 per square mile (10.5/km^{2}). The racial makeup of the county was 88.06% White, 2.51% African American, 4.88% Native American, 1.28% Asian, 1.05% Pacific Islander, _% from some other races and 2.22% from two or more races. Hispanic or Latino people of any race were 3.53% of the population.

=== 2020 census ===
As of the 2020 census, there were 98,458 people, 39,927 households, and 24,822 families residing in the county. The population density was 60.30 inhabitants per square mile (23.3/km^{2}). There were 42,692 housing units at an average density of 26.15 per square mile (10.1/km^{2}). The racial makeup of the county was 86.48% White, 2.32% African American, 4.32% Native American, 1.07% Asian, 0.32% Pacific Islander, 1.13% from some other races and 4.35% from two or more races. Hispanic or Latino people of any race were 3.13% of the population.

There were 39,927 households in the county, of which 28.9% had children under the age of 18 living with them and 24.4% had a female householder with no spouse or partner present. About 31.3% of all households were made up of individuals and 11.1% had someone living alone who was 65 years of age or older. Among occupied housing units, 69.0% were owner-occupied and 31.0% were renter-occupied. The homeowner vacancy rate was 1.4% and the rental vacancy rate was 9.0%.

Of the residents, 23.2% were under the age of 18 and 16.8% were 65 years of age or older; the median age was 37.6 years. For every 100 females there were 99.9 males, and for every 100 females age 18 and over there were 98.8 males.

=== 2010 census ===
As of the 2010 census, there were 81,308 people, 33,976 households, and 21,213 families residing in the county. The population density was 49.8 inhabitants per square mile (19.2/km^{2}). There were 35,754 housing units at an average density of 21.90 per square mile (8.5/km^{2}). The racial makeup of the county was 93.02% White, 0.59% African American, 4.17% Native American, 0.48% Asian, 0.03% Pacific Islander, 0.28% from some other races and 1.42% from two or more races. Hispanic or Latino people of any race were 1.21% of the population.

In terms of ancestry, 61.0% were German, 21.1% were Norwegian, 8.1% were Russian, 6.8% were Irish, and 2.6% were American.

There were 33,976 households, 29.0% had children under the age of 18 living with them, 50.2% were married couples living together, 8.7% had a female householder with no husband present, 37.6% were non-families, and 30.5% of all households were made up of individuals. The average household size was 2.31 and the average family size was 2.90. The median age was 37.3 years.

The median income for a household in the county was $53,465 and the median income for a family was $71,103. Males had a median income of $44,944 versus $31,943 for females. The per capita income for the county was $28,784. About 6.3% of families and 9.4% of the population were below the poverty line, including 11.6% of those under age 18 and 11.0% of those age 65 or over.

== Communities ==
=== Cities ===
- Bismarck (county seat)
- Lincoln
- Regan
- Wilton (partly in McLean County)
- Wing

=== Census-designated places ===
- Apple Valley
- Driscoll
- Menoken

=== Unincorporated communities ===
- Arena
- Baldwin
- McKenzie
- Moffit
- Sterling
- Wogansport

=== Townships ===
- Apple Creek
- Boyd
- Canfield
- Christiania
- Clear Lake
- Crofte
- Cromwell
- Driscoll
- Ecklund
- Estherville
- Francis
- Ghylin
- Gibbs
- Glenview
- Grass Lake
- Harriet-Lein
- Hazel Grove
- Hay Creek
- Logan
- Long Lake
- McKenzie
- Menoken
- Missouri
- Morton
- Naughton
- Painted Woods
- Richmond
- Rock Hill
- Schrunk-Steiber
- Sibley Butte
- Sterling
- Taft
- Telfer
- Thelma
- Trygg
- Wild Rose
- Wilson
- Wing

=== Unorganized territories ===
- Burnt Creek-Riverview
- Florence Lake
- Lincoln-Fort Rice
- Lyman
- Phoenix

== Politics ==
Burleigh County voters have voted Republican for several decades. With the exception of 1964, no Democratic Party candidate has received even 40 percent of the county's vote after 1940.

United States presidential election results for Burleigh County, North Dakota
Year	Republican		Democratic		Third party(ies)	
Year	No.	%	No.	%	No.	%
1900	679	66.44%	339	33.17%	4	0.39%
1904	1,340	83.23%	237	14.72%	33	2.05%
1908	1,375	65.82%	660	31.59%	54	2.58%
1912	720	36.20%	609	30.62%	660	33.18%
1916	1,182	45.46%	1,267	48.73%	151	5.81%
1920	4,300	77.28%	943	16.95%	321	5.77%
1924	3,152	53.17%	379	6.39%	2,397	40.44%
1928	3,955	55.59%	3,076	43.23%	84	1.18%
1932	2,687	31.84%	5,621	66.61%	131	1.55%
1936	2,447	25.17%	6,314	64.94%	962	9.89%
1940	5,858	57.06%	4,350	42.37%	58	0.56%
1944	4,616	59.95%	3,061	39.75%	23	0.30%
1948	5,049	59.45%	3,117	36.70%	327	3.85%
1952	9,526	79.55%	2,400	20.04%	49	0.41%
1956	9,199	73.79%	3,231	25.92%	37	0.30%
1960	9,492	62.13%	5,761	37.71%	25	0.16%
1964	7,239	46.95%	8,120	52.66%	60	0.39%
1968	10,661	64.03%	5,139	30.87%	849	5.10%
1972	13,909	67.38%	5,841	28.29%	894	4.33%
1976	13,680	58.09%	9,188	39.02%	681	2.89%
1980	18,437	67.94%	6,129	22.59%	2,571	9.47%
1984	19,913	68.25%	8,781	30.10%	482	1.65%
1988	18,000	61.89%	10,760	37.00%	324	1.11%
1992	16,484	50.90%	8,940	27.61%	6,960	21.49%
1996	15,464	51.74%	10,679	35.73%	3,747	12.54%
2000	22,467	65.16%	9,842	28.54%	2,173	6.30%
2004	26,577	68.47%	11,621	29.94%	616	1.59%
2008	25,443	60.58%	15,600	37.14%	956	2.28%
2012	27,951	64.42%	14,122	32.55%	1,314	3.03%
2016	32,532	67.80%	10,881	22.68%	4,566	9.52%
2020	34,744	68.46%	14,348	28.27%	1,661	3.27%
2024	36,595	70.02%	14,215	27.20%	1,453	2.78%

== Education ==
School districts include:

K-12:

- Bismarck Public Schools, District 1, Bismarck
- Hazelton-Moffit-Braddock Public School, District 6, Hazelton
- Kidder County School, District 1, Steele
- McClusky School District, District 19, McClusky
- Wilton School District, District 1, Wilton - Formerly known as the Montefiore Public School District 1
- Wing School District, District 28, Wing

Elementary:

- Apple Creek Public School, District 39, Apple Creek
- Manning Public School, District 45, Manning
- Menoken Public School, District 33, Menoken
- Naughton Public School, District 25, Naughton
- Sterling Public School, District 35, Sterling

== See also ==
- National Register of Historic Places listings in Burleigh County, North Dakota
