= Boyd Township, North Dakota =

- Township
- Location within North Dakota
- Coordinates: 46°45′54″N 100°31′15″W
- Country: United States
- State: North Dakota
- County: Burleigh

Area
  - Total: 35.99 sq mi (93.22 km^{2})
  - Land: 35.99 sq mi (93.22 km^{2})
  - Water: 0 sq mi (0.00 km^{2})
- Elevation: 1,755 ft (535 m)

Population (2020)
  - Total: 139
  - Density: 3.86/sq mi (1.49/km^{2})
- Time zone: UTC-6 (Central (CST))
  - Summer (DST): UTC-5 (CDT)
- Area code: 701
- FIPS code: 38-08780
- GNIS feature ID: 1759334

Boyd Township is a township in Burleigh County, North Dakota, United States. The population was 139 at the 2020 census.

== Geography ==
Boyd Township has a total area of 35.992 square miles (93.22 km^{2}), all land.

== Demographics ==
As of the 2023 American Community Survey, there were an estimated 33 households.
