= Estherville Township, North Dakota =

- Township
- Location within North Dakota
- Coordinates: 47°12′02″N 100°33′33″W
- Country: United States
- State: North Dakota
- County: Burleigh

Area
  - Total: 35.49 sq mi (91.92 km^{2})
  - Land: 35.49 sq mi (91.92 km^{2})
  - Water: 0 sq mi (0.00 km^{2})
- Elevation: 2,030 ft (620 m)

Population (2020)
  - Total: 43
  - Density: 1.2/sq mi (0.47/km^{2})
- Time zone: UTC-6 (Central (CST))
  - Summer (DST): UTC-5 (CDT)
- Area code: 701
- FIPS code: 38-24940
- GNIS feature ID: 1037140

Estherville Township is a township in Burleigh County, North Dakota, United States. The population was 43 at the 2020 census.

== Geography ==
Estherville Township has a total area of 35.489 square miles (91.92 km^{2}), all land.

== Demographics ==
As of the 2023 American Community Survey, there were an estimated 27 households.
