= Wing School District =

School district in North Dakota, United States

Address
- 4th and Main Wing, North Dakota, 58494; United States

District information
- Type: Public
- Grades: PreK–12
- NCES District ID: 3820130

Students and staff
- Students: 71
- Teachers: 14.85
- Staff: 15.55
- Student–teacher ratio: 4.78

Other information
- Website: www.wing.k12.nd.us

Wing Public School District 28 is a school district headquartered in Wing, North Dakota.

It is within Burleigh County.

A playground was built in 1965. In 2014 it was replaced with new equipment.

By 2020 the district began using a school week of four days instead of five. The district administration decided on this due to the low number of breaks in the spring season and the harsh winters.
