= Naughton Township, North Dakota =

- Township
- Location within North Dakota
- Coordinates: 46°56′22″N 100°38′42″W
- Country: United States
- State: North Dakota
- County: Burleigh

Area
  - Total: 35.98 sq mi (93.19 km^{2})
  - Land: 35.98 sq mi (93.19 km^{2})
  - Water: 0 sq mi (0.00 km^{2})
- Elevation: 1,969 ft (600 m)

Population (2020)
  - Total: 207
  - Density: 5.75/sq mi (2.22/km^{2})
- Time zone: UTC-6 (Central (CST))
  - Summer (DST): UTC-5 (CDT)
- Area code: 701
- FIPS code: 38-55540
- GNIS feature ID: 1037122

Naughton Township is a township in Burleigh County, North Dakota, United States. The population was 207 at the 2020 census.

== Geography ==
Naughton Township has a total area of 35.981 square miles (93.19 km^{2}), all land.

== Demographics ==
As of the 2023 American Community Survey, there were an estimated 56 households.

== Education ==
An elementary school, Naughton Elementary School, is located in the township's center. It was named after a former nearby landowner, John Patrick Naughton.
