= Logan Township, North Dakota =

- Township
- Location within North Dakota
- Coordinates: 46°45′53″N 100°23′41″W
- Country: United States
- State: North Dakota
- County: Burleigh

Area
  - Total: 36.03 sq mi (93.32 km^{2})
  - Land: 35.82 sq mi (92.78 km^{2})
  - Water: 0.21 sq mi (0.54 km^{2})
- Elevation: 1,713 ft (522 m)

Population (2020)
  - Total: 36
  - Density: 1.0/sq mi (0.39/km^{2})
- Time zone: UTC-6 (Central (CST))
  - Summer (DST): UTC-5 (CDT)
- Area code: 701
- FIPS code: 38-47500
- GNIS feature ID: 1759338

Logan Township is a township in Burleigh County, North Dakota, United States. The population was 36 at the 2020 census.

== Geography ==
Logan Township has a total area of 36.031 square miles (93.32 km^{2}), of which 35.823 square miles (92.78 km^{2}) is land and 0.208 square miles (0.54 km^{2}) is water.

== Demographics ==
As of the 2023 American Community Survey, there were an estimated 4 households.
