= Canfield Lake National Wildlife Refuge =

National Wildlife Refuge in North Dakota, US

Coordinates: 47°11′09″N 100°27′32″W

Canfield Lake National Wildlife Refuge is a National Wildlife Refuge in Burleigh County, North Dakota. It is a privately owned property with refuge easement rights for flooding with 1.2 ha (3 acres) owned in fee, and is one of six easement refuges managed under Long Lake National Wildlife Refuge. It is closed to hunting.

This is a limited-interest national wildlife refuge. The FWS has an easement on private property allowing it to manage wildlife habitat, but the land remains private property. There is no public access except from adjacent public roads. Limited-interest refuges were created in the 1930s and 1940s in response to declining waterfowl populations and the need to get people back to work during the Great Depression. Many landowners sold easements allowing the federal government to regulate water levels and restrict hunting.

The refuge centers on the 3,400-acre glacial Canfield Lake, which attracts concentrations waterfowl. It is adjacent to the Basaraba WPA, which consists of several hundred acres of tall dense tamegrass cover and interspersed wetlands.
