= Wilson Township, North Dakota =

Wilson Township
- Township
- Location within North Dakota
- Coordinates: 47°17′16″N 100°41′07″W
- Country: United States
- State: North Dakota
- County: Burleigh

Area
  - Total: 34.54 sq mi (89.46 km^{2})
  - Land: 33.72 sq mi (87.34 km^{2})
  - Water: 0.82 sq mi (2.12 km^{2})
- Elevation: 1,910 ft (580 m)

Population (2020)
  - Total: 51
  - Density: 1.5/sq mi (0.58/km^{2})
- Time zone: UTC-6 (Central (CST))
  - Summer (DST): UTC-5 (CDT)
- Area code: 701
- FIPS code: 38-86540
- GNIS feature ID: 1037135

Wilson Township is a township in Burleigh County, North Dakota, United States. The population was 51 at the 2020 census.

== Geography ==
Wilson Township has a total area of 34.541 square miles (89.46 km^{2}), of which 33.721 square miles (87.34 km^{2}) is land and 0.820 square miles (2.12 km^{2}) is water.

=== Major highways ===
- ND 41

== Demographics ==
As of the 2023 American Community Survey, there was 1 estimated household.
