= Canfield Township, North Dakota =

- Township
- Location within North Dakota
- Coordinates: 47°12′01″N 100°25′55″W
- Country: United States
- State: North Dakota
- County: Burleigh

Area
  - Total: 35.94 sq mi (93.09 km^{2})
  - Land: 35.51 sq mi (91.96 km^{2})
  - Water: 0.44 sq mi (1.13 km^{2})
- Elevation: 1,991 ft (607 m)

Population (2020)
  - Total: 27
  - Density: 0.76/sq mi (0.29/km^{2})
- Time zone: UTC-6 (Central (CST))
  - Summer (DST): UTC-5 (CDT)
- Area code: 701
- FIPS code: 38-11940
- GNIS feature ID: 1037143

Canfield Township is a township in Burleigh County, North Dakota, United States. The population was 27 at the 2020 census.

== Geography ==
Canfield Township has a total area of 35.941 square miles (93.09 km^{2}), of which 35.506 square miles (91.96 km^{2}) is land and 0.435 square miles (1.13 km^{2}) is water.

== Demographics ==
As of the 2023 American Community Survey, there were an estimated 6 total households.
