= Wild Rose Township, North Dakota =

Wild Rose Township
- Township
- Location within North Dakota
- Coordinates: 46°40′38″N 100°08′37″W
- Country: United States
- State: North Dakota
- County: Burleigh

Area
  - Total: 35.98 sq mi (93.20 km^{2})
  - Land: 31.69 sq mi (82.08 km^{2})
  - Water: 4.29 sq mi (11.12 km^{2})
- Elevation: 1,801 ft (549 m)

Population (2020)
  - Total: 18
  - Density: 0.57/sq mi (0.22/km^{2})
- Time zone: UTC-6 (Central (CST))
  - Summer (DST): UTC-5 (CDT)
- Area code: 701
- FIPS code: 38-85980
- GNIS feature ID: 1037066

Wild Rose Township is a township in Burleigh County, North Dakota, United States. The population was 18 at the 2020 census.

== Geography ==
Wild Rose Township has a total area of 35.986 square miles (93.20 km^{2}), of which 31.693 square miles (82.08 km^{2}) is land and 4.293 square miles (11.12 km^{2}) is water.

== Demographics ==
As of the 2023 American Community Survey, there were an estimated 7 households.
