= Grass Lake Township, North Dakota =

- Township
- Location within North Dakota
- Coordinates: 47°12′02″N 100°41′09″W
- Country: United States
- State: North Dakota
- County: Burleigh

Area
  - Total: 36.03 sq mi (93.32 km^{2})
  - Land: 35.46 sq mi (91.85 km^{2})
  - Water: 0.57 sq mi (1.47 km^{2})
- Elevation: 2,011 ft (613 m)

Population (2020)
  - Total: 47
  - Density: 1.3/sq mi (0.51/km^{2})
- Time zone: UTC-6 (Central (CST))
  - Summer (DST): UTC-5 (CDT)
- Area code: 701
- FIPS code: 38-32740
- GNIS feature ID: 1037184

Grass Lake Township is a township in Burleigh County, North Dakota, United States. The population was 47 at the 2020 census.

== Geography ==
Grass Lake Township has a total area of 36.030 square miles (93.32 km^{2}), of which 35.462 square miles (91.85 km^{2}) is land and 0.568 square miles (1.47 km^{2}) is water.

== Demographics ==
As of the 2023 American Community Survey, there were an estimated 4 households.
