= North Dakota Highway 37 =

State highway in North Dakota, U.S.

North Dakota Highway 37
- ND 37 highlighted in red

Route information
- Maintained by NDDOT
- Length: 61.920 mi (99.651 km)
- Existed: 1927–present

Major junctions
- West end: ND 23 / ND 1804 north of Parshall
- ND 28 northeast of White Shield
- East end: US 83 / ND 1804 east of Garrison

Location
- Country: United States
- State: North Dakota
- Counties: McLean, Mountrail

Highway system
- North Dakota State Highway System; Interstate; US; State
← ND 36	→ ND 38

North Dakota Highway 37 (ND 37) is a 61.920-mile-long (99.651 km) east–west state highway in the U.S. state of North Dakota. ND 37's western terminus is at ND 23 and ND 1804 north of Parshall, and the eastern terminus is at U.S. Route 83 (US 83) and ND 1804 east of Garrison.

== Major intersections ==
County	Location	mi	km	Destinations	Notes
Mountrail		0.000	0.000	ND 23 / ND 1804 north	Western terminus, western end of ND 1804 concurrency
McLean		16.887	27.177	ND 1804 south	Eastern end of ND 1804 concurrency
McLean		37.861	60.931	ND 28 north	Southern terminus of ND 28
McLean		43.883	70.623	ND 1804 north	Western end of ND 1804 concurrency
McLean		61.920	99.651	US 83 / ND 1804 south	Eastern terminus, Eastern end of ND 1804 concurrency
1.000 mi = 1.609 km; 1.000 km = 0.621 mi: Concurrency terminus
