= Anamoose, North Dakota =

- City
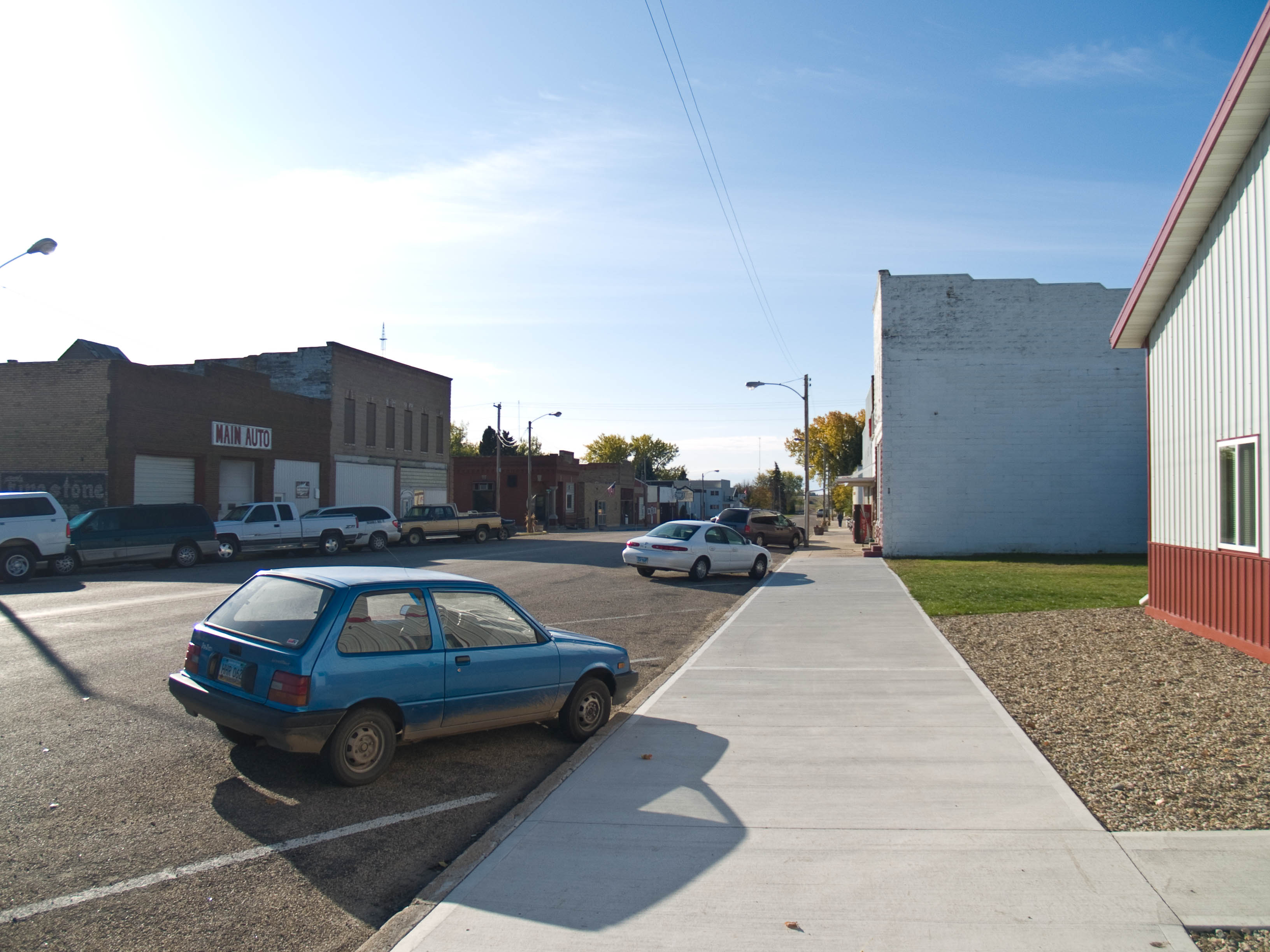
- Business district of Anamoose
- Interactive map of Anamoose, North Dakota
- Location within North Dakota
- Coordinates: 47.8831°N 100.2423°W
- Country: United States
- State: North Dakota
- County: McHenry
- Founded: 1898

Area
  - Total: 0.631 sq mi (1.634 km^{2})
  - Land: 0.623 sq mi (1.614 km^{2})
  - Water: 0.0081 sq mi (0.021 km^{2}) 1.27%
- Elevation: 1,624 ft (495 m)

Population (2020)
  - Total: 230
  - Estimate (2025): 216
  - Density: 370/sq mi (140/km^{2})
- Time zone: UTC–6 (Central (CST))
  - Summer (DST): UTC–5 (CDT)
- ZIP Code: 58710
- Area code: 701
- FIPS code: 38-02220
- GNIS feature ID: 1035910
- Website: anamoose.com

Anamoose is a city in McHenry County, North Dakota, United States. The population was 230 as of the 2020 census, and was estimated at 216 in 2025. It is part of the Minot metropolitan area.

== History ==
Anamoose was established along the main line of the Soo Line Railroad in 1898 by Romanians who had come from Saskatchewan, Canada. The name is a corruption of the Chippewa word uhnemoosh, which means "female dog."

== Geography ==
According to the United States Census Bureau, the city has a total area of 0.631 square miles (1.63 km^{2}), of which 0.623 square miles (1.61 km^{2}) is land and 0.008 square miles (0.02 km^{2}) (1.27%) is water.

== Demographics ==
Historical population
Census	Pop.	Note	%±
1910	669		—
1920	563		−15.8%
1930	495		−12.1%
1940	478		−3.4%
1950	542		13.4%
1960	503		−7.2%
1970	401		−20.3%
1980	355		−11.5%
1990	277		−22.0%
2000	282		1.8%
2010	227		−19.5%
2020	230		1.3%
2025 (est.)	216		−6.1%
U.S. Decennial Census; 2020 Census

=== 2020 census ===
As of the 2020 census, there were 230 people, 104 households, and 63 families residing in the city.

=== 2010 census ===
As of the 2010 census, there were 227 people, 108 households, and 72 families residing in the city. The population density was 372.1 inhabitants per square mile (143.7/km^{2}). There were 140 housing units at an average density of 229.5 per square mile (88.6/km^{2}). The racial makeup of the city was 99.6% White and 0.4% Native American.

There were 108 households, of which 19.4% had children under the age of 18 living with them, 58.3% were married couples living together, 5.6% had a female householder with no husband present, 2.8% had a male householder with no wife present, and 33.3% were non-families. 32.4% of all households were made up of individuals, and 18.5% had someone living alone who was 65 years of age or older. The average household size was 2.10 and the average family size was 2.61.

The median age in the city was 48.6 years. 18.5% of residents were under the age of 18; 6.6% were between the ages of 18 and 24; 19.8% were from 25 to 44; 25.1% were from 45 to 64; and 30% were 65 years of age or older. The gender makeup of the city was 50.7% male and 49.3% female.

=== 2000 census ===
As of the 2000 census, there were 282 people, 130 households, and 86 families residing in the city. The population density was 455.2 people per square mile (175.8 people/km^{2}). There were 149 housing units at an average density of 240.5 per square mile (92.9/km^{2}). The racial makeup of the city was 99.65% White, and 0.35% from two or more races. 0.00% of the population were Hispanic or Latino people of any race.

The top 6 ancestry groups in the city are German (66.0%), Norwegian (19.1%), English (5.7%), Swedish (4.3%), Czech (3.9%), United States (3.9%).

There were 130 households, out of which 21.5% had children under the age of 18 living with them, 56.9% were married couples living together, 5.4% had a female householder with no husband present, and 33.8% were non-families. 31.5% of all households were made up of individuals, and 22.3% had someone living alone who was 65 years of age or older. The average household size was 2.17 and the average family size was 2.73.

In the city, the population was spread out, with 19.9% under the age of 18, 5.3% from 18 to 24, 21.6% from 25 to 44, 21.3% from 45 to 64, and 31.9% who were 65 years of age or older. The median age was 47 years. For every 100 females, there were 94.5 males. For every 100 females age 18 and over, there were 96.5 males.

The median income for a household in the city was $28,438, and the median income for a family was $40,192. Males had a median income of $28,750 versus $19,688 for females. The per capita income for the city was $15,120. About 5.1% of families and 12.7% of the population were below the poverty line, including 11.9% of those under the age of eighteen and 22.8% of those 65 or over.
