= Drake, North Dakota =

- City
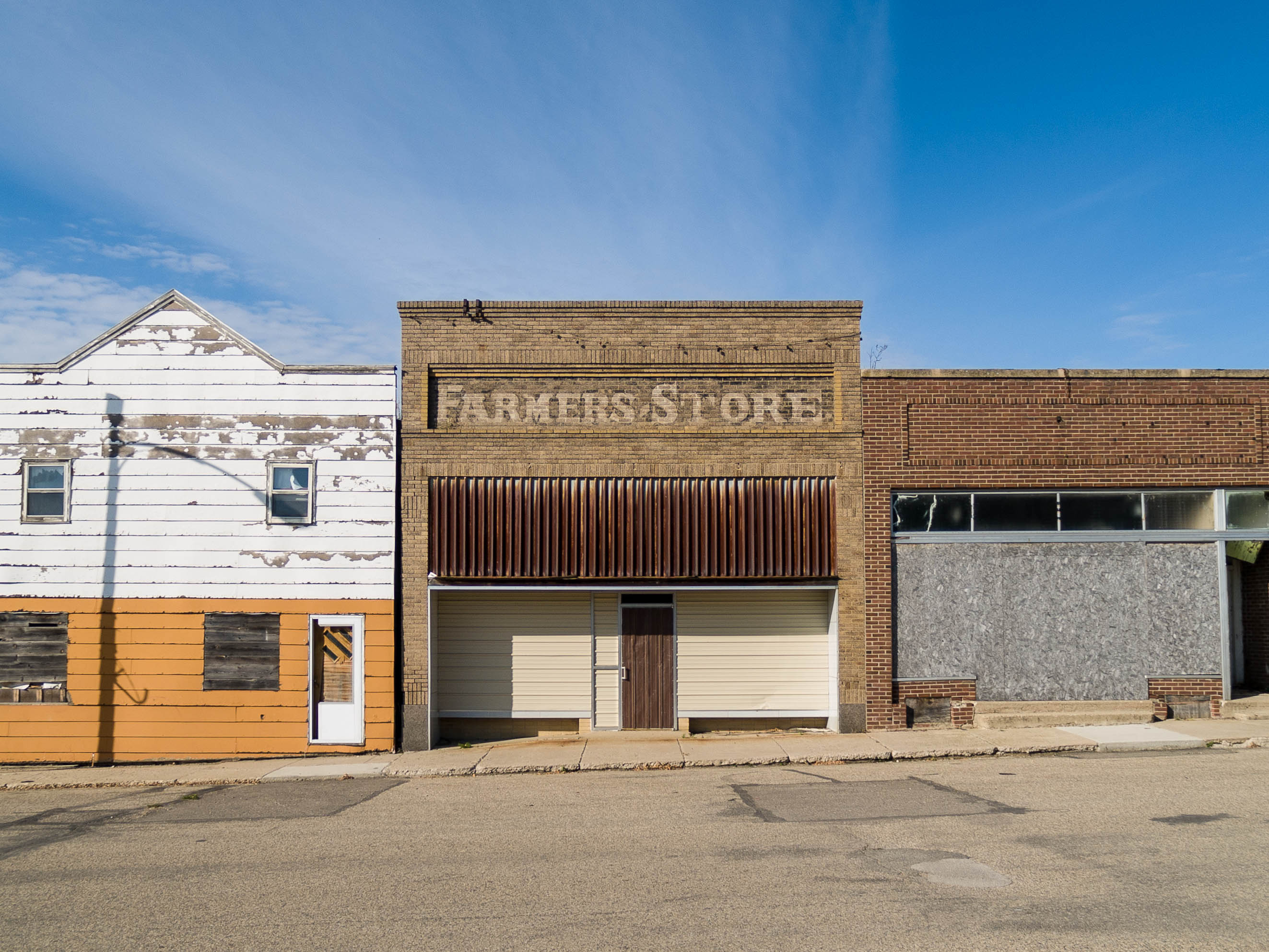
- Farmers Store in Drake

- Location of Drake, North Dakota
- Coordinates: 47°55′21″N 100°22′28″W
- Country: United States
- State: North Dakota
- County: McHenry
- Founded: 1902

Area
  - Total: 2.02 sq mi (5.23 km^{2})
  - Land: 1.97 sq mi (5.11 km^{2})
  - Water: 0.046 sq mi (0.12 km^{2})
- Elevation: 1,644 ft (501 m)

Population (2020)
  - Total: 292
  - Estimate (2022): 282
  - Density: 148.0/sq mi (57.13/km^{2})
- Time zone: UTC-6 (Central (CST))
  - Summer (DST): UTC-5 (CDT)
- ZIP code: 58736
- Area code: 701
- FIPS code: 38-20300
- GNIS feature ID: 1035997

Drake is a city in McHenry County, North Dakota, United States. The population was 292 at the 2020 census. It is part of the Minot Metropolitan Statistical Area. Drake was founded in 1902 and named after Herman Drake, a settler.

== Geography ==
According to the United States Census Bureau, the city has a total area of 2.02 square miles (5.23 km^{2}), of which 1.97 square miles (5.10 km^{2}) is land and 0.05 square miles (0.13 km^{2}) is water.

== Demographics ==
Historical population
Census	Pop.	Note	%±
1910	348		—
1920	517		48.6%
1930	644		24.6%
1940	654		1.6%
1950	831		27.1%
1960	752		−9.5%
1970	636		−15.4%
1980	479		−24.7%
1990	361		−24.6%
2000	322		−10.8%
2010	275		−14.6%
2020	292		6.2%
2022 (est.)	282		−3.4%
U.S. Decennial Census; 2020 Census

=== 2010 census ===
As of the census of 2010, there were 275 people, 144 households, and 70 families residing in the city. The population density was 139.6 inhabitants per square mile (53.9/km^{2}). There were 200 housing units at an average density of 101.5 per square mile (39.2/km^{2}). The racial makeup of the city was 97.8% White, 0.4% Native American, and 1.8% from two or more races. Hispanic or Latino of any race were 2.5% of the population.

There were 144 households, of which 17.4% had children under the age of 18 living with them, 39.6% were married couples living together, 5.6% had a female householder with no husband present, 3.5% had a male householder with no wife present, and 51.4% were non-families. 44.4% of all households were made up of individuals, and 27% had someone living alone who was 65 years of age or older. The average household size was 1.91 and the average family size was 2.70.

The median age in the city was 48.1 years. 17.8% of residents were under the age of 18; 4.7% were between the ages of 18 and 24; 23.7% were from 25 to 44; 26.2% were from 45 to 64; and 27.6% were 65 years of age or older. The gender makeup of the city was 50.5% male and 49.5% female.

=== 2000 census ===
As of the census of 2000, there were 322 people, 164 households, and 94 families residing in the city. The population density was 163.1 inhabitants per square mile (63.0/km^{2}). There were 201 housing units at an average density of 101.8 per square mile (39.3/km^{2}). The racial makeup of the city was 100.00% White. Hispanic or Latino of any race were 0.31% of the population.

There were 164 households, out of which 18.9% had children under the age of 18 living with them, 47.0% were married couples living together, 9.8% had a female householder with no husband present, and 42.1% were non-families. 38.4% of all households were made up of individuals, and 23.8% had someone living alone who was 65 years of age or older. The average household size was 1.96 and the average family size was 2.60.

In the city, the population was spread out, with 18.3% under the age of 18, 4.0% from 18 to 24, 19.3% from 25 to 44, 22.7% from 45 to 64, and 35.7% who were 65 years of age or older. The median age was 51 years. For every 100 females, there were 97.5 males. For every 100 females age 18 and over, there were 87.9 males.

The median income for a household in the city was $22,813, and the median income for a family was $34,844. Males had a median income of $23,250 versus $17,083 for females. The per capita income for the city was $13,023. About 8.2% of families and 15.2% of the population were below the poverty line, including 18.3% of those under age 18 and 16.3% of those age 65 or over.

== Book burning controversy ==
The school board ordered books considered obscene, including Slaughterhouse Five by Kurt Vonnegut and Deliverance by James Dickey, assigned to the sophomore English class, be confiscated and burned in 1973. The resulting national controversy surrounding burning 32 copies of Slaughterhouse Five resulted in an out of court settlement, including permission for the work to be taught to high school juniors and seniors.

== Climate ==
This climatic region is typified by large seasonal temperature differences, with warm to hot (and often humid) summers and cold (sometimes severely cold) winters. According to the Köppen Climate Classification system, Drake has a humid continental climate, abbreviated "Dfb" on climate maps.

Climate data for Drake 9 NE, North Dakota (1991–2020 normals, extremes 1964–present)
Month	Jan	Feb	Mar	Apr	May	Jun	Jul	Aug	Sep	Oct	Nov	Dec	Year
Record high °F (°C)	60 (16)	63 (17)	77 (25)	99 (37)	100 (38)	105 (41)	108 (42)	106 (41)	107 (42)	93 (34)	78 (26)	61 (16)	108 (42)
Mean daily maximum °F (°C)	17.2 (−8.2)	22.0 (−5.6)	34.4 (1.3)	51.9 (11.1)	65.9 (18.8)	75.0 (23.9)	80.9 (27.2)	81.0 (27.2)	71.0 (21.7)	54.3 (12.4)	36.0 (2.2)	22.7 (−5.2)	51.0 (10.6)
Daily mean °F (°C)	7.2 (−13.8)	11.5 (−11.4)	23.9 (−4.5)	39.6 (4.2)	53.3 (11.8)	63.5 (17.5)	68.5 (20.3)	67.4 (19.7)	57.5 (14.2)	42.5 (5.8)	26.2 (−3.2)	13.2 (−10.4)	39.5 (4.2)
Mean daily minimum °F (°C)	−2.8 (−19.3)	0.9 (−17.3)	13.4 (−10.3)	27.2 (−2.7)	40.7 (4.8)	51.9 (11.1)	56.1 (13.4)	53.8 (12.1)	44.0 (6.7)	30.6 (−0.8)	16.4 (−8.7)	3.7 (−15.7)	28.0 (−2.2)
Record low °F (°C)	−44 (−42)	−45 (−43)	−33 (−36)	−12 (−24)	8 (−13)	29 (−2)	34 (1)	28 (−2)	18 (−8)	−8 (−22)	−32 (−36)	−41 (−41)	−45 (−43)
Average precipitation inches (mm)	0.41 (10)	0.47 (12)	0.68 (17)	1.13 (29)	2.61 (66)	3.57 (91)	2.66 (68)	2.18 (55)	1.70 (43)	1.44 (37)	0.71 (18)	0.59 (15)	18.15 (461)
Average precipitation days (≥ 0.01 in)	5.2	4.7	4.7	5.6	8.8	10.4	8.6	7.2	6.5	6.3	5.2	5.7	78.9
Source: NOAA
