= Fallon, North Dakota =

- Unincorporated community
- Location within North Dakota Location within the United States
- Coordinates: 46°30′44″N 101°05′28″W
- Country: United States
- State: North Dakota
- County: Morton
- Elevation: 2,120 ft (650 m)
- Time zone: UTC-6 (Central (CST))
  - Summer (DST): UTC-5 (CDT)
- ZIP Code: 58535 (Flasher)
- Area code: 701
- GNIS feature ID: 1028943

Fallon is an unincorporated community in Morton County, North Dakota, United States. Fallon is located about 35 miles (56 km) southwest of Bismarck, roughly 10 miles (16 km) by road northeast of Flasher, on the former Mandan-Black Hills (also known as the Bismarck-Deadwood) stage trail. Another town located along this line is Saint Anthony Crossing, about 4 miles (6 km) northwest of Saint Anthony.

The settlement of Fallon started to develop in the late 1890s, and a post office was opened April 2, 1900, with James A. Fallon, a native of Ireland, as postmaster, who is also most likely the town's namesake. In 1909 it was relocated to the northeast with H. S. Freiz as postmaster. The peak population was only about 10 people, due to the town's inland location away from an operational railroad or highway, thus very little development ever occurred. The post office closed November 15, 1914, with mail to Flasher. Since then, the town has withered considerably. There was once a store, St. Peter and Paul Catholic Church, and a Catholic boarding school on site, and although they were torn down decades ago, multiple scattered foundations can still be found. Today, there are currently two buildings left at the site, a community center or possibly town/dance hall, and the former church parish house, which appears to have been last occupied in 2008. The St. Peter and Paul cemetery is located just to the west of the town, and is frequently maintained.

In summer 2017, a man briefly moved to the townsite in two RVs to the north of the house, but his presence didn't last long. In early 2018, the population was back to zero. The campers were overgrown with weeds, and there was so sign of him. He may have left for medical reasons, or possibly because of the unusually harsh 2017-18 winter.
