= Wilton School District (North Dakota) =

School district in North Dakota, United States

Wilton Public School District 1, also known as Wilton School District, is a school district in North Dakota, headquartered in Wilton.

Its facility is Wilton Public School. It is organized as Wilton Elementary School in elementary grades and Wilton High School in secondary grades.

The school district is partially in Burleigh County, where it includes a portion of Wilton and all of Regan. The rest of it is in McLean County, where it includes the rest of Wilton.

== History ==
The district was previously known as the Montefiore Public School District 1.

Starting in 2013, Andrew Jordan had been the principal of the secondary school division. He held this position until 2016. Effective July 1, 2018, he was to then become the superintendent.

In 2022 there were additional students at the school, partly due to students being sent from Bismarck, and so some classes were having too many students. That year, a bond referendum was held to finance an addition.
