= Long Lake Township, North Dakota =

Civil township in North Dakota, U.S.

Coordinates: 46°40′40″N 100°13′51″W

Long Lake Township is a civil township in Burleigh County in the U.S. state of North Dakota. As of the 2010 census, its population was 103.
