= North Dakota Highway 14 =

State highway in North Dakota, US

North Dakota Highway 14

Route information
- Maintained by NDDOT
- Length: 175.003 mi (281.640 km)
- Existed: 1926–present

Major junctions
- South end: I-94 / US 83 near Sterling
- ND 200 near Goodrich; US 52 from Anamoose to Drake; US 2 in Towner; ND 5 near Bottineau
- North end: PTH 21 at the Canadian border near Carbury

Location
- Country: United States
- State: North Dakota
- Counties: Burleigh, Sheridan, McHenry, Bottineau

Highway system
- North Dakota State Highway System; Interstate; US; State
← ND 13	→ ND 15

North Dakota Highway 14 (ND 14) is a 175.003-mile-long (281.640 km) north–south state highway in the U.S. state of North Dakota. ND 14's southern terminus is at Interstate 94 (I-94) and U.S. Route 83 (US 83) north of Sterling, and the northern terminus is a continuation as Manitoba Highway 21 (PTH 21) at the Canada–United States border.

== Route description ==
ND 14 begins at I-94 and US 83 near Sterling, and continues north for 73.2 miles until joining US 52 to go northwest just outside of Anamoose. Along the 73.2 miles, ND 14 intersects with ND 36 outside of Wing, and ND 200 in rural Sheridan County near Denhoff. On US 52, ND 14 leaves the highway a few miles west of Drake and proceeds northwards to US 2 for 26.8 miles. After a brief concurrency with US 2, ND 14 leaves the highway in Towner and heads northwest to ND 5 for almost 40 miles. After leaving the concurrency with ND 5 near Bottineau, ND 14 heads north to the Canadian Border for 12.8 miles, with the road into Canada continuing as Provincial Trunk Highway 21 towards Deloraine, Manitoba.

== Major intersections ==
County	Location	mi	km	Destinations	Notes
Burleigh		0.000	0.000	I-94 / US 83 – Bismarck, Fargo	Southern terminus, I-94 Exit 182, road continues south as US 83 south
Burleigh	Wing	21.289	34.261	ND 36 – Wing, Regan	
Sheridan		45.777	73.671	ND 200 – Goodrich, McClusky	
McHenry		73.323	118.002	US 52 east – Harvey	Southern end of US 52 concurrency
McHenry		83.796	134.857	US 52 west – Balfour, Velva, Minot	Northern end of US 52 concurrency
McHenry		110.581	177.963	US 2 west – Minot	Southern end of US 2 concurrency
McHenry	Towner	114.295	183.940	US 2 east – Rugby	Northern end of US 2 concurrency
Bottineau		154.201	248.162	ND 5 west – Mohall	Southern end of ND 5 concurrency
Bottineau		162.192	261.023	ND 5 east – Bottineau	Northern end of ND 5 concurrency
Bottineau		171.712	276.344	ND 43 east – Lake Metigoshe, Peace Garden	Western terminus of ND 43
Bottineau		175.003	281.640	PTH 21 north – Deloraine	Continues north into Canada
1.000 mi = 1.609 km; 1.000 km = 0.621 mi: Concurrency terminus
