= Arena, North Dakota =

Human settlement in North Dakota, United States of America

Coordinates: 47°07′38″N 100°09′44″W

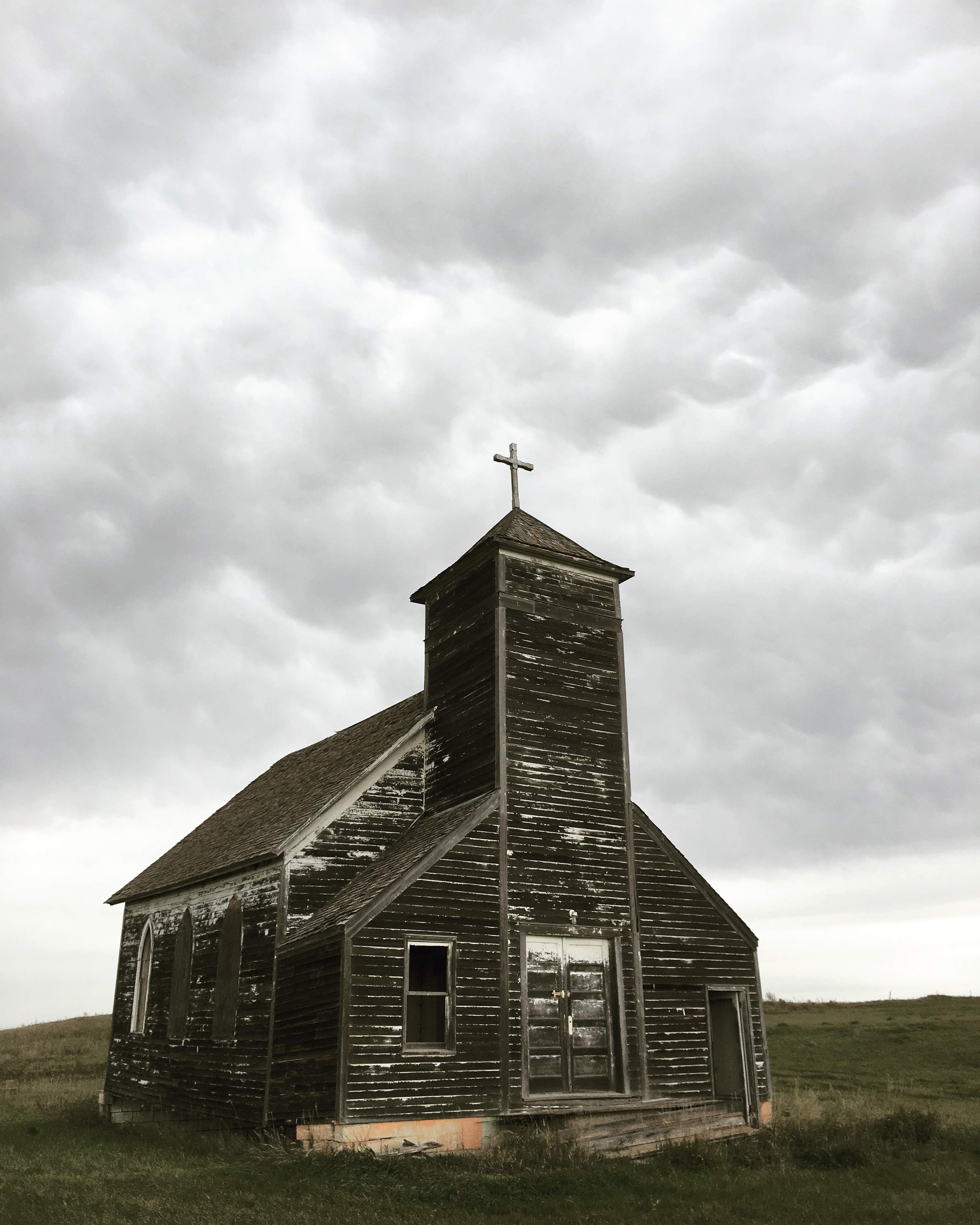
Church in Arena, ND

Arena is an extinct town in Burleigh County, North Dakota, United States. The GNIS classifies it as a populated place.

Arena was founded in January 1906 and never had a population of more than 150. It withered during the Great Depression, and, as of 2018, all that remained was St. John's Lutheran Church, an old wooden school house moved to the town in the 1970s for voting, multiple abandoned homes, a railcar, and several outbuildings. A post office called Arena was established in 1906, and remained in operation along with a general store until 1996 when the building was robbed and torched by vandals. Burnt remains of the store can still be found, but the site has been occupied by a house on blocks since 2016. The house fueled some speculation that the town would have its first residents in 35 years. However, the rumors stopped a year later when a visitor found the town still completely abandoned, no signs of anyone planning to live there. In the late 1990s, early 2000s the school was razed by George Pehl, the reason is said to be because the building was a "hazard". Upon hearing the news, the county school district reportedly said "Thanks!" Arena was named to note its location in a shallow valley surrounded by hills – a natural arena. Postcards from approximately 1924 show several businesses such as a hardware store, farmer's store, general merchandising, and a pool hall. At one time there were five cream buying stations and a large grain elevator in the town, of which only the elevator remains.

== See also ==
- List of ghost towns in North Dakota
