= Driscoll, North Dakota =

- Census-designated place
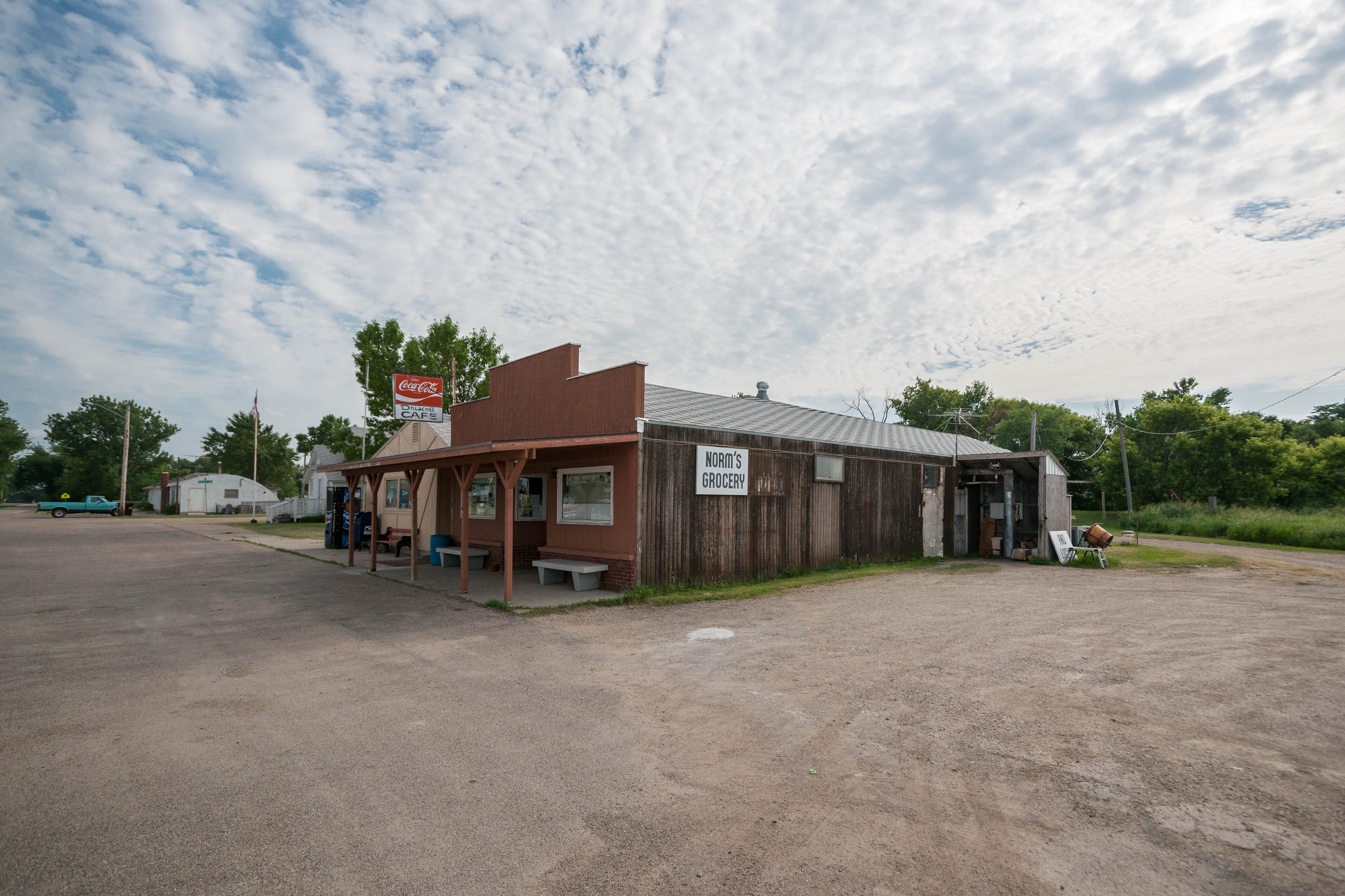
- The former Norm's Grocery in Driscoll

- Location within North Dakota Location within the United States
- Coordinates: 46°50′34″N 100°08′38″W
- Country: United States
- State: North Dakota
- County: Burleigh
- Township: Driscoll
- Named after: Frederick Driscoll

Area
  - Total: 0.58 sq mi (1.49 km^{2})
  - Land: 0.58 sq mi (1.49 km^{2})
  - Water: 0 sq mi (0.00 km^{2})
- Elevation: 1,870 ft (570 m)

Population (2020)
  - Total: 68
  - Density: 117.9/sq mi (45.53/km^{2})
- Time zone: UTC-6 (Central (CST))
  - Summer (DST): UTC-5 (CDT)
- ZIP code: 58532
- Area code: 701
- FIPS code: 38-20500
- GNIS feature ID: 2628574

Driscoll is a census-designated place in southeastern Burleigh County, North Dakota, United States. An unincorporated community, it was designated as part of the U.S. Census Bureau's Participant Statistical Areas Program on June 10, 2010. It was not counted separately during the 2000 Census, but was included in the 2010 Census, where a population of 82 was reported. In 2018, Driscoll was counted as a Census Designated Place, and had a population of 78. As of the 2020 Census, the population was reported to be 68.

Driscoll lies just off Interstate 94, east of the city of Bismarck, the county seat of Burleigh County. it had a post office, with the ZIP code 58532.

Journalist Era Bell Thompson grew up in Driscoll; hers was the only black family in town.

== History ==
Driscoll was named for Frederick Driscoll, a newspaper manager.

In June 2015, The Coal Car Diner closed. Three months later in September 2015, the owners of Norm's Grocery, and the cafe announced their retirement. On October 10, an auction was held and all remaining equipment and materials were sold. The grocery store had been a mainstay of the town, being open for 57 years. The towns Post Office was located in a small portion of the grocery store, which was forced to close as well. Donna Meland was postmaster and operated the cafe, while Norm Meland operated the store. Mail has since been changed to rural service.

== Demographics ==
Historical population
Census	Pop.	Note	%±
2020	68		—
U.S. Decennial Census
