= U.S. Route 83 in North Dakota =

Segment of American highway

U.S. Highway 83
- US 83 highlighted in red

Route information
- Maintained by NDDOT
- Length: 256.98 mi (413.57 km)
- Existed: 1926–present

Major junctions
- South end: US 83 south of Hague
- I-94 from Sterling to Bismarck; ND 200 in Underwood; US 2 / US 52 in Minot; ND 5 near Mohall
- North end: PTH 83 at the Canadian border north of Westhope

Location
- Country: United States
- State: North Dakota
- Counties: Emmons, Burleigh, McLean, Ward, Renville, Bottineau

Highway system
- United States Numbered Highway System; List; Special; Divided; North Dakota State Highway System; Interstate; US; State
← US 81	→ US 85

U.S. Route 83 (US 83) is a part of the U.S. Highway System that travels from the Mexico–United States border in Brownsville, Texas, to the Canada–United States border near Westhope, North Dakota. In the state of North Dakota, US 83 extends from the South Dakota border north to the Canada-United States border.

== Route description ==
US 83 enters North Dakota at the South Dakota state line, near the town of Hague, and runs northward for approximately 68 miles (109 km), serving the small cities of Strasburg, Linton, Temvik, Hazelton, and Moffit before reaching the junctions of Interstate 94 (I-94) and ND 14 near Sterling. It then follows I-94 west to exit 159 in Bismarck, while ND 14 continues north towards Wing. US 83 meets ND 1804 at exit 159. It resumes a generally northward course as a four-lane highway referred to as State Street. North of Bismarck, ND 1804 turns west and then heads north and meets Highway 83 again south of Washburn.

Headed toward Minot, US 83/ND 1804 traverses mostly agricultural land, passing through or near some small cities such as Baldwin, Wilton, Washburn (home of Fort Mandan and the Lewis and Clark Interpretive Center), where it meets ND 200 Alt., and Underwood, north to Max. It meets ND 200 proper north and east of Underwood. Leaving Underwood, US 83 passes by the Falkirk Mine, a large strip-mining coal (lignite) operation which can be seen from the roadway in the vicinity of Falkirk; a small viaduct carried coal over the highway for several years (the Falkirk Mine serves the nearby Coal Creek Station, also visible from the highway). It meets the northern segment of ND 48 in Coleharbor. North of Coleharbor, US 83 briefly merges both roadways and shares land with an adjacent railroad line in order to cross a causeway that separates Lake Sakakawea from Lake Audubon. North of the lakes, US 83 junctions with ND 37 about six miles east of the city of Garrison. ND 1804 leaves US 83 again and follows ND 37 west. The surroundings return to cropland and grazing land, though a wind farm is located south of Minot. It junctions with ND 23 between Max and Minot.

US 83 passes directly through Minot, where it meets US 2/US 52. US 2 goes west towards Williston and east towards Devils Lake. US 52 goes northwest to Canada and southeast towards Jamestown. US 83 in Minot is known as Broadway, although the US 83 Byp. Minot Bypass to the west is an alternate route. The northbound route passes the junction of US 2 Bus./US 52 Bus. in downtown (Burdick Expressway). It passes the airport and continues to Minot Air Force Base, where it returns to a two-lane highway. US 83 eventually meets up with eastbound North Dakota Highway 5 (ND 5) about thirty miles (50 km) north of the base at an intersection long referred to as 'Renville Corner'. US 83 and ND 5 continue east for approximately ten miles (16 km). The highway then diverges from ND 5 to head north to Westhope and the border with Canada at the 49th parallel, and enters southwestern Manitoba as Provincial Trunk Highway 83.

== Major intersections ==
County	Location	mi	km	Destinations	Notes
Emmons	South Emmons	0.000	0.000	US 83 south – Herreid, Selby	Continuation into South Dakota
Emmons	South Emmons	6.027	9.700	ND 11 east – Hague	Western terminus of ND 11
Emmons	Linton	24.942	40.140	ND 13 east – Wishek	Southern end of ND 13 concurrency
Emmons	Linton	25.958	41.775	ND 13 west	Northern end of ND 13 concurrency
Emmons	Hazelton	41.623	66.986	ND 34 east – Napoleon	Western terminus of ND 34
Burleigh	Sterling Township	65.934	106.110	I-94 east / ND 14 north – Fargo, Wing	Southern end of I-94 concurrency, southern terminus of ND 14
Burleigh	Bismarck	86.983	139.986	I-94 BL (Bismarck Expressway/Centennial Road) – Lincoln	I-94 exit 161
Burleigh	Bismarck	88.998	143.228	I-94 west / ND 1804 south – Bismarck, Billings	Northern end of I-94 concurrency, southern end of first ND 1804 concurrency
Burleigh	Hay Creek Township	92.463	148.805	ND 1804 north	Northern end of first ND 1804 concurrency
Burleigh	Ecklund Township	110.652	178.077	ND 36 east – Regan	Western terminus of ND 36
McLean	South McLean	112.712	181.392	ND 41 north – Mercer	Southern terminus of ND 41
McLean	South McLean	121.262	195.152	ND 1804 south	Southern end of second ND 1804 concurrency
McLean	Washburn	128.027	206.039	ND 200A – Turtle Lake	Access to Washburn Municipal Airport
McLean	Underwood	140.262	225.730	ND 200 east – Turtle Lake	Southern end of ND 200 concurrency
McLean	Underwood Township	147.556	237.468	ND 200 west – Riverdale, Pick City	Northern end of ND 200 concurrency
McLean	Coleharbor	151.354	243.581	ND 48 south – Riverdale, Pick City	Northern terminus of ND 48
McLean	Snow Township	159.621	256.885	ND 37 west / ND 1804 north – Garrison	Northern end of second ND 1804 concurrency, eastern terminus of ND 37, Access to CHI St. Alexius Health-Garrison
McLean	Max	171.616	276.189	ND 53 east – Benedict	Western terminus of ND 53
Ward	Gasman Township	182.717	294.055	ND 23 – Parshall, New Town, Velva	
Ward	Minot	198.581	319.585	US 2 / US 52 / US 83 Byp. west – Williston, Devils Lake, Jamestown	Southern terminus of US 83 Byp.
Ward	Minot	200.298	322.348	US 2 Bus. / US 52 Bus. (Burdick Expressway)	
Ward	Minot	203.842	328.052	US 83 Byp.	Northern terminus of US 83 Byp.
Renville	No major junctions				
Bottineau	Renville Township	237.020	381.447	ND 5 west / ND 256 north – Mohall, Port of Entry	Southern end of ND 5 concurrency, southern terminus of ND 256
Bottineau	Sergius Township	253.622	408.165	ND 5 east – Bottineau	Northern end of ND 5 concurrency
Bottineau	Richburg Township	256.980	413.569	PTH 83 north – Melita, Virden	Canadian border
1.000 mi = 1.609 km; 1.000 km = 0.621 mi: Concurrency terminus

U.S. Route 83
Previous state: South Dakota	North Dakota	Next state: Terminus
