= Regan, North Dakota =

- City
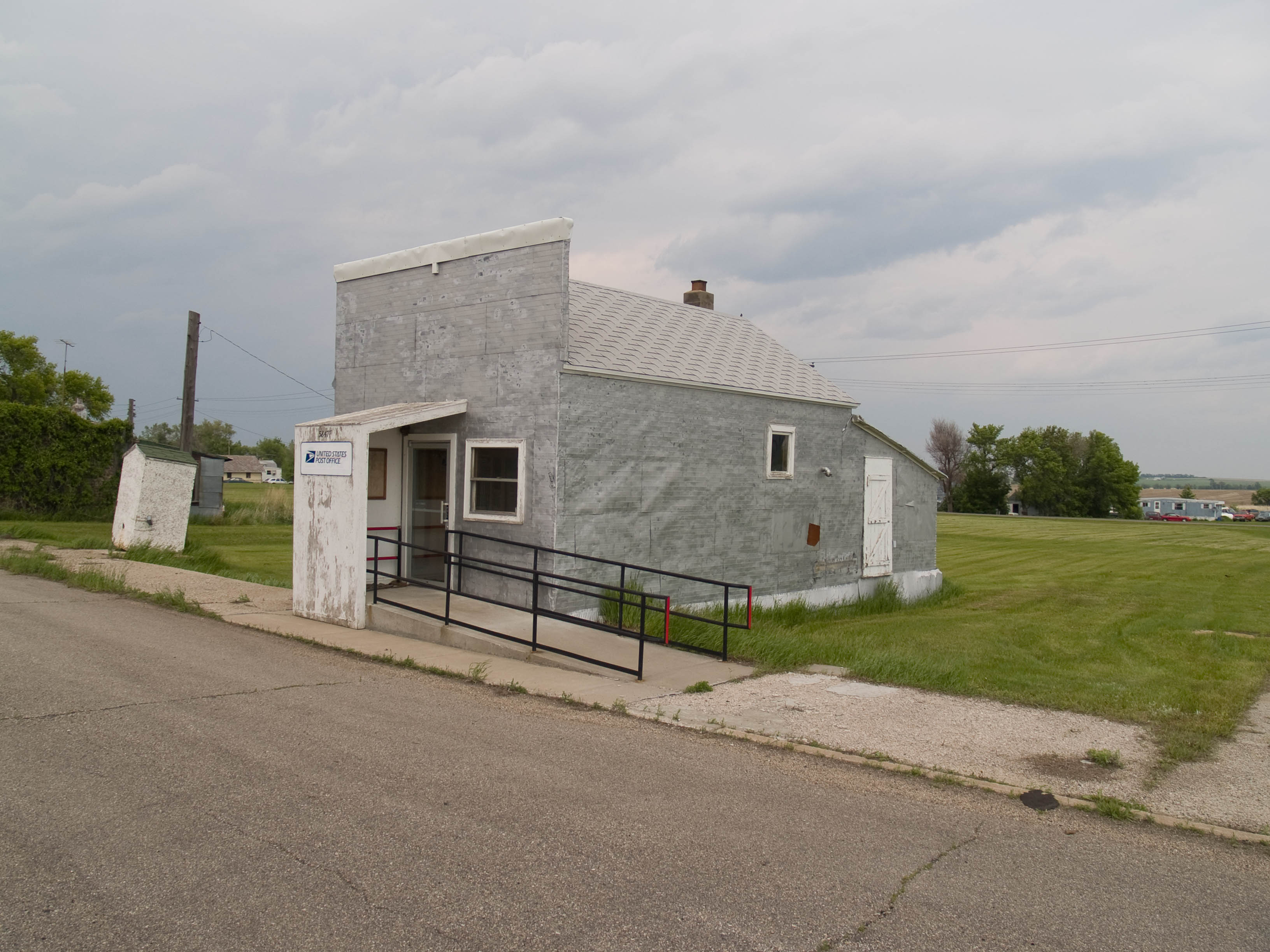
- US Post office Regan

- Location of Regan, North Dakota
- Coordinates: 47°09′24″N 100°31′38″W
- Country: United States
- State: North Dakota
- County: Burleigh
- Founded: 1912
- Incorporated (village): 1916

Area
  - Total: 1.02 sq mi (2.63 km^{2})
  - Land: 1.02 sq mi (2.63 km^{2})
  - Water: 0 sq mi (0.00 km^{2})
- Elevation: 2,031 ft (619 m)

Population (2020)
  - Total: 35
  - Estimate (2022): 34
  - Density: 34.5/sq mi (13.33/km^{2})
- Time zone: UTC-6 (Central (CST))
  - Summer (DST): UTC-5 (CDT)
- ZIP code: 58477
- Area code: 701
- FIPS code: 38-65980
- GNIS feature ID: 1036233

Regan is a city in Burleigh County, North Dakota, United States. Its population was 35 at the 2020 census. Regan was founded in 1912.

== History ==
Regan was established after the Northern Pacific Railway built a line through the area in 1912. The settlement was named for J. Austin Regan, a land company official who had platted the townsite in 1911. A post office and a church opened in 1912, and a newspaper, The Regan Headlight, was established in 1913. The Regan School opened in 1914 in a building previously used as a barbershop. The early town had two banks, a lumber yard, a blacksmith shop, a butcher shop, and a hotel. A telephone company was established in 1915, and Regan was incorporated as a village in 1916. An automobile garage opened in 1917.

== Geography ==
According to the United States Census Bureau, the city has a total area of 1.01 square miles (2.62 km^{2}), all land.

=== Climate ===
This climatic region is typified by large seasonal temperature differences, with warm to hot (and often humid) summers and cold (sometimes severely cold) winters. According to the Köppen Climate Classification system, Regan has a humid continental climate, abbreviated "Dfb" on climate maps.

== Demographics ==
Historical population
Census	Pop.	Note	%±
1920	202		—
1930	162		−19.8%
1940	149		−8.0%
1950	129		−13.4%
1960	104		−19.4%
1970	74		−28.8%
1980	71		−4.1%
1990	51		−28.2%
2000	43		−15.7%
2010	43		0.0%
2020	35		−18.6%
2022 (est.)	34		−2.9%
U.S. Decennial Census; 2020 Census

Regan is part of the "Bismarck, ND Metropolitan Statistical Area" or "Bismarck–Mandan".

=== 2010 census ===
As of the census of 2010, there were 43 people in 23 households, including 12 families, in the city. The population density was 42.6 inhabitants per square mile (16.4/km^{2}). There were 31 housing units at an average density of 30.7 per square mile (11.9/km^{2}). The racial makup of the city was 95.3% White and 4.7% from two or more races.

Of the 23 households 17.4% had children under the age of 18 living with them, 52.2% were married couples living together, and 47.8% were non-families. 43.5% of households were one person and 13% were one person aged 65 or older. The average household size was 1.87 and the average family size was 2.58.

The median age was 54.5 years. 16.3% of residents were under the age of 18; 4.7% were between the ages of 18 and 24; 23.2% were from 25 to 44; 27.9% were from 45 to 64; and 27.9% were 65 or older. The gender makeup of the city was 58.1% male and 41.9% female.

=== 2000 census ===
As of the census of 2000, there were 43 people in 23 households, including 12 families, in the city. The population density was 42.6 inhabitants per square mile (16.4/km^{2}). There were 32 housing units at an average density of 31.7 per square mile (12.2/km^{2}). The racial makup of the city was 100.00% White.

Of the 23 households 17.4% had children under the age of 18 living with them, 43.5% were married couples living together, 4.3% had a female householder with no husband present, and 43.5% were non-families. 34.8% of households were one person and none had someone living alone who was 65 or older. The average household size was 1.87 and the average family size was 2.31.

The age distribution was 11.6% under the age of 18, 9.3% from 18 to 24, 27.9% from 25 to 44, 25.6% from 45 to 64, and 25.6% 65 or older. The median age was 45 years. For every 100 females, there were 126.3 males. For every 100 females age 18 and over, there were 137.5 males.

The median household income was $17,083 and the median family income was $30,417. Males had a median income of $18,333 versus $21,250 for females. The per capita income for the city was $13,224. There were 30.8% of families and 36.7% of the population living below the poverty line, including 80.0% of under eighteens and none of those over 64.

== Education ==
It is in the Wilton Public School District 1.
