= Menoken, North Dakota =

- Census-designated place
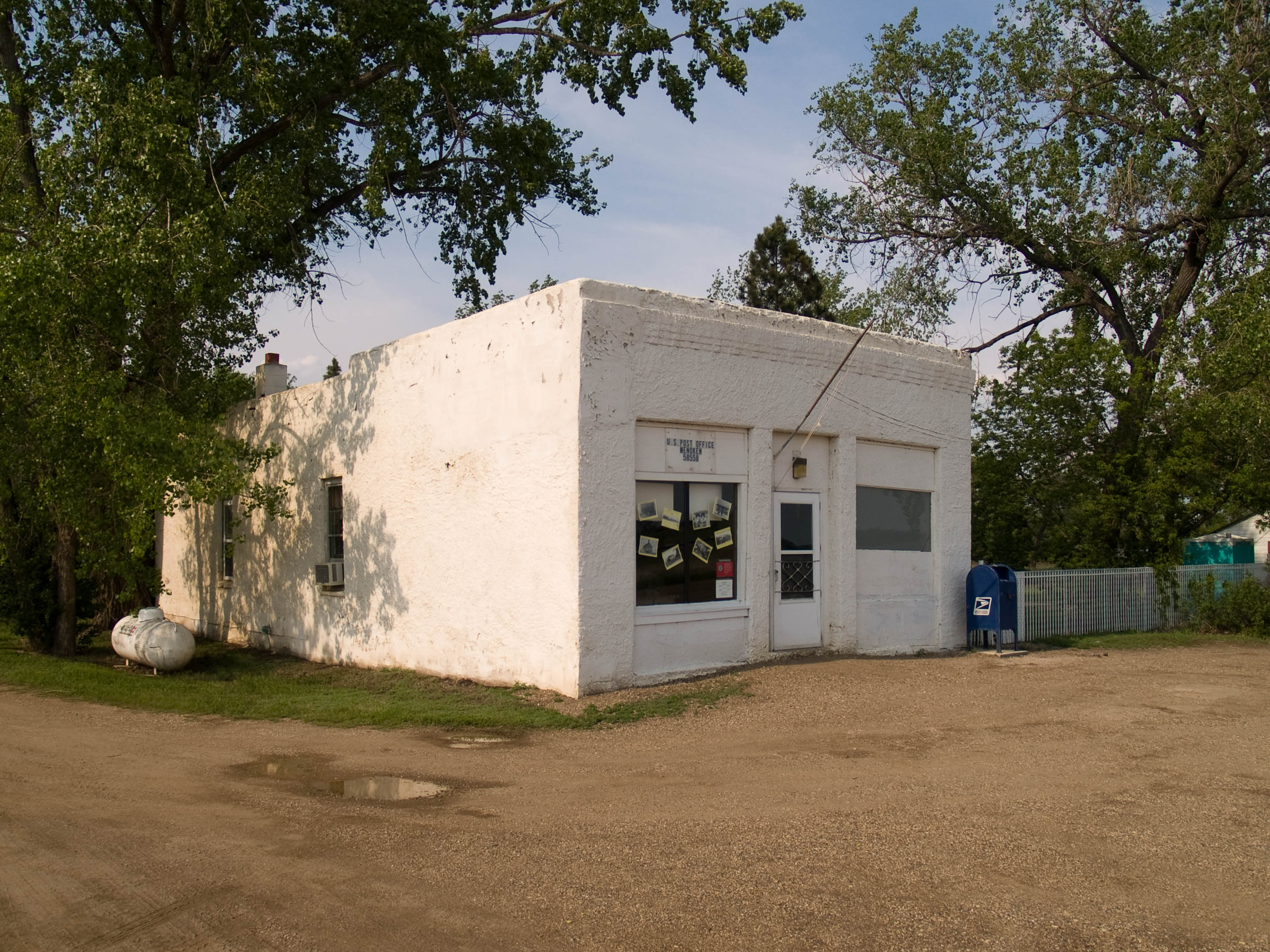
- Post office in Menoken

- Location within North Dakota Location within the United States
- Coordinates: 46°48′54″N 100°32′03″W
- Country: United States
- State: North Dakota
- County: Burleigh
- Township: Menoken

Area
  - Total: 2.24 sq mi (5.80 km^{2})
  - Land: 2.18 sq mi (5.64 km^{2})
  - Water: 0.062 sq mi (0.16 km^{2})
- Elevation: 1,736 ft (529 m)

Population (2020)
  - Total: 78
  - Density: 35.8/sq mi (13.84/km^{2})
- Time zone: UTC-6 (Central (CST))
  - Summer (DST): UTC-5 (CDT)
- ZIP codes: 58558
- Area code: 701
- FIPS code: 38-52180
- GNIS feature ID: 2628575

Menoken is an unincorporated community and a census-designated place (CDP) in southwestern Burleigh County, North Dakota, United States. As of the 2020 census, Menoken had a population of 78. It was designated as part of the U.S. Census Bureau's Participant Statistical Areas Program on June 10, 2010. It was not counted separately during the 2000 Census, but was included in the 2010 Census.

It lies east of the city of Bismarck, the county seat of Burleigh County. Its elevation is 1,722 feet (525 m). The community has had many different names, starting with Seventeenth Siding in 1873, then it was soon renamed Blaine for James G. Blaine, U.S. Senator from Maine, then when the post office opened in 1880, the town was renamed Clarke's Farm after C.J. Clarke of Pittsburgh, a local farmer. The town was finally renamed Menoken in 1883, which is an Indian name, but the Northern Pacific Railroad disliked the new name and changed the name of their station in 1891 to Burleigh (a.k.a. Burleigh Station), and the siding still carries this alternate name to this day. It had a post office with the ZIP code 58558. The post office closed on June 3, 2016.

== Climate ==
This climatic region is typified by large seasonal temperature differences, with warm to hot (and often humid) summers and cold (sometimes severely cold) winters. According to the Köppen Climate Classification system, Menoken has a humid continental climate, abbreviated "Dfb" on climate maps.

== Demographics ==
Historical population
Census	Pop.	Note	%±
2020	78		—
U.S. Decennial Census

== Education ==
It is in the Menoken Public School District 33.
