= North Dakota Highway 36 =

State highway in North Dakota, U.S.

North Dakota Highway 36
- ND 36 highlighted in red

Route information
- Maintained by NDDOT
- Length: 90.344 mi (145.395 km)
- Existed: 1926–present

Major junctions
- West end: US 83 south of Wilton
- ND 14 in Wing; ND 3 in Tuttle
- East end: US 52/ US 281 in Pingree

Location
- Country: United States
- State: North Dakota
- Counties: Burleigh, Kidder, Stutsman

Highway system
- North Dakota State Highway System; Interstate; US; State
← ND 35	→ ND 37

North Dakota Highway 36 (ND 36) is a 90.344-mile-long (145.395 km) east–west state highway in the U.S. state of North Dakota. ND 36's western terminus is at U.S. Route 83 (US 83) south of Wilton, and the eastern terminus is a US 52/US 281 in Pingree.

== Major Intersections ==
County	Location	mi	km	Destinations	Notes
Burleigh		0.000	0.000	US 83 – Wilton, Bismarck	Western terminus
Burleigh	Wing	23.907	38.475	ND 14 – Denhoff, Sterling	
Kidder		38.916	62.629	ND 3 – Hurdsfield, Steele	
Stutsman	Pingree	90.344	145.395	US 52/ US 281 – Carrington, Jamestown	Eastern terminus
1.000 mi = 1.609 km; 1.000 km = 0.621 mi
