= North Dakota Highway 1804 =

Highway in North Dakota

North Dakota Highway 1804
- Lewis and Clark Trail
- ND 1804 highlighted in red

Route information
- Maintained by NDDOT
- Length: 342.805 mi (551.691 km)

Major junctions
- South end: SD 1804 near Pollock at South Dakota border
- I-94 in Bismarck; US 83 from Bismarck to east of Garrison; ND 200 in Underwood; US 85B west of Williston; US 2 in Williston; US 85 in Williston
- North end: S-327 at Fort Union Trading Post at Montana border

Location
- Country: United States
- State: North Dakota
- Counties: Emmons, Burleigh, McLean, Mountrail, Williams

Highway system
- North Dakota State Highway System; Interstate; US; State
← ND 810	→ ND 1806

North Dakota Highway 1804 (ND 1804) is a state highway in the U.S. state of North Dakota. ND 1804 and ND 1806 were named to reflect the years of Lewis and Clark's travels through the area, and together constitute the portion of the Lewis and Clark Trail that runs through North Dakota along the northeast and southwest sides of Lake Sakakawea and the Missouri River, respectively.

== Route description ==
Highway 1804 begins at the border between North Dakota and South Dakota near Pollock, South Dakota, and continues uninterrupted along the north east side of the Missouri River through Emmons, Burleigh, McLean, Mountrail, and Williams counties. At the intersection of Bismarck Expressway in Bismarck, the highway temporarily splits into a separate northbound route (concurrent with 9th Street) and southbound route (concurrent with 7th Street) until both roads terminate at E Boulevard Avenue in front of the North Dakota State Capitol grounds. Further north in Bismarck, ND 1804 intersects Interstate 94, from which it runs concurrent with US 83 for a short distance.

Just north of Bismarck, ND 1804 diverges from US 83 to closely follow the Missouri River. It once again runs concurrent with US 83 until just northeast of Lake Sakakawea, where ND 1804 permanently diverges west to closely follow the lake. At Williston, a brief concurrence with US 2 and US 85 begins and ends as ND 1804 dips south alongside the Missouri River to meet its final terminus at Montana Secondary Highway 327 in the Fort Union Trading Post National Historic Site.

== Major intersections ==
County	Location	mi	km	Destinations	Notes
Emmons		0.000	0.000	SD 1804 – Pollock	Continuation into South Dakota
Emmons		28.902	46.513	ND 13 east / Lewis and Clark Trail ends – Linton	Southern end of LCT concurrency; western terminus of ND 13
Burleigh	Bismarck	78.575	126.454	Bismarck Expressway / ND 1804 north (9th Street)	South end of southbound concurrency with Bismarck Expwy.
Burleigh	Bismarck			Bismarck Expressway west	North end of southbound concurrency with Bismarck Expwy.
Burleigh	Bismarck			Main Avenue (I-94 BL)	
Burleigh	Bismarck	81.221	130.713	I-94 / US 83 south – Fargo, Billings	Southern end of US 83 concurrency; I-94 exit 159
Burleigh		82.973	133.532	US 83 north – Minot	Northern end of US 83 concurrency
McLean		113.383	182.472	US 83 south – Wilton, Bismarck	Southern end of US 83 concurrency
McLean	Washburn	120.147	193.358	ND 200A – Turtle Lake, Stanton, Hazen	
McLean		132.382	213.048	ND 200 east – Turtle Lake	Southern end of ND 200 concurrency
McLean		139.676	224.787	ND 200 west – Riverdale, Pick City	Northern end of ND 200 concurrency
McLean	Coleharbor	143.474	230.899	ND 48 (32nd Avenue NW) – Riverdale, Pick City	
McLean	Lake Sakakawea			Bridge	
McLean		151.741	244.203	US 83 north / ND 37 west – Minot, Garrison	Northern end of US 83 concurrency; southern end of ND 37 concurrency; eastern terminus of ND 37
McLean		185.218	298.079	ND 37 west – Ryder, Parshall	Northern end of ND 37 concurrency
McLean		213.688	343.898	ND 37 east	Southern end of ND 37 concurrency
Mountrail		230.575	371.074	ND 23 / ND 37 east – US 83	Northern end of ND 37 concurrency; southern end of ND 23 concurrency; western terminus of ND 37
Mountrail		240.540	387.112	ND 8 north / CR 15 – Stanley, Van Hook	Roundabout; southern terminus of ND 8; northern terminus of CR 15
Mountrail				ND 23B west (Truck Route)	Eastern terminus of NC 23B
Mountrail	New Town	247.145	397.741	ND 23 west – Watford City	Northern end of ND 23 concurrency
Mountrail		248.391	399.747	ND 23B (Truck Route)	
Williams				CR 9 south	Southern end of CR 9 concurrency
Williams	Williston			US 85B north / CR 9 north (Truck Route) – Landfill	Southern terminus of US 85B; northern end of CR 9 concurrency
Williams	Williston	317.979	511.738	US 2 Bus. east	Southern end of US 2 Bus. concurrency
Williams	Williston	319.826	514.710	US 2 west / US 2 Bus. east	Southern end of US 2 concurrency, northern end of US 2 Bus. concurrency, western terminus of US 2 Bus.
Williams	Williston	322.521	519.047	US 85 – Watford City	
Williams		324.991	523.022	US 2 west – Bainville	Northern end of US 2 concurrency
Williams	Buford	341.054	548.873	ND 58 south / Lewis and Clark Trail west – Sidney, Fairview	Northern end of LCT concurrency; northern terminus of ND 58
Williams		342.805	551.691	S-327 – Bainville	Continuation into Montana
1.000 mi = 1.609 km; 1.000 km = 0.621 mi: Concurrency terminus
