= Baldwin, North Dakota =

- Unincorporated community
- Location within North Dakota Location within the United States
- Coordinates: 47°01′36″N 100°44′58″W
- Country: United States
- State: North Dakota
- County: Burleigh
- Elevation: 1,939 ft (591 m)
- Time zone: UTC-6 (Central (CST))
  - Summer (DST): UTC-5 (CDT)
- ZIP codes: 58521
- Area code: 701
- GNIS feature ID: 1027796

Baldwin is an unincorporated community in western Burleigh County, North Dakota, United States. It lies along U.S. Route 83 north of the city of Bismarck, the county seat of Burleigh County. Baldwin's elevation is 1,939 feet (591 m). Baldwin has a post office with the ZIP code 58521.

== History ==
The population was 150 in 1940.

Baldwin is referenced in the Highway to Heaven episode 1:23, entitled "The Right Thing." A grandfather character, played by Lew Ayres, talks about a plaque with his name "back on the wall of the YMCA in Baldwin, North Dakota," even though there has never been a YMCA in the town. Although a railroad cuts straight through town, the grain elevators were torn down in the late 1990s or early 2000s. There were once multiple business buildings across from the grain elevators, but they were also torn down sometime between 2003 and 2005. Highway 83 bypassed the town, so there is little traffic. In 2018, the population was estimated to be less than 25. A post office and rural fire department are currently in operation, along with Baldwin greenhouse/nursery roughly 1/2 mile west of town.
