= Sterling, North Dakota =

- Unincorporated community
- Location within North Dakota Location within the United States
- Coordinates: 46°48′50″N 100°17′29″W
- Country: United States
- State: North Dakota
- County: Burleigh

Area
  - Total: 36.0 sq mi (93.2 km^{2})
  - Land: 36.0 sq mi (93.2 km^{2})
  - Water: 0 sq mi (0.0 km^{2})
- Elevation: 1,828 ft (557 m)

Population (2000)
  - Total: 172
  - Density: 4.78/sq mi (1.85/km^{2})
- Time zone: UTC-6 (Central (CST))
  - Summer (DST): UTC-5 (CDT)
- ZIP code: 58572
- Area code: 701
- FIPS code: 38-75940
- GNIS feature ID: 1032304

Sterling is an unincorporated community in Burleigh County, North Dakota, United States at the intersection of Interstate 94 and U.S. Route 83. Sterling is part of the "Bismarck, ND Metropolitan Statistical Area" or "Bismarck-Mandan".

== Demographics ==
Historical population
Census	Pop.	Note	%±
1900	198		—
1910	190		−4.0%
1920	176		−7.4%
1930	170		−3.4%
1940	134		−21.2%
1950	110		−17.9%
1960	119		8.2%
1970	124		4.2%
1980	102		−17.7%
1990	67		−34.3%
2000	46		−31.3%
2010	35		−23.9%
2017 (est.)	32		−8.6%
U.S. Decennial Census; 2015 Estimate
