= Wing, North Dakota =

- City
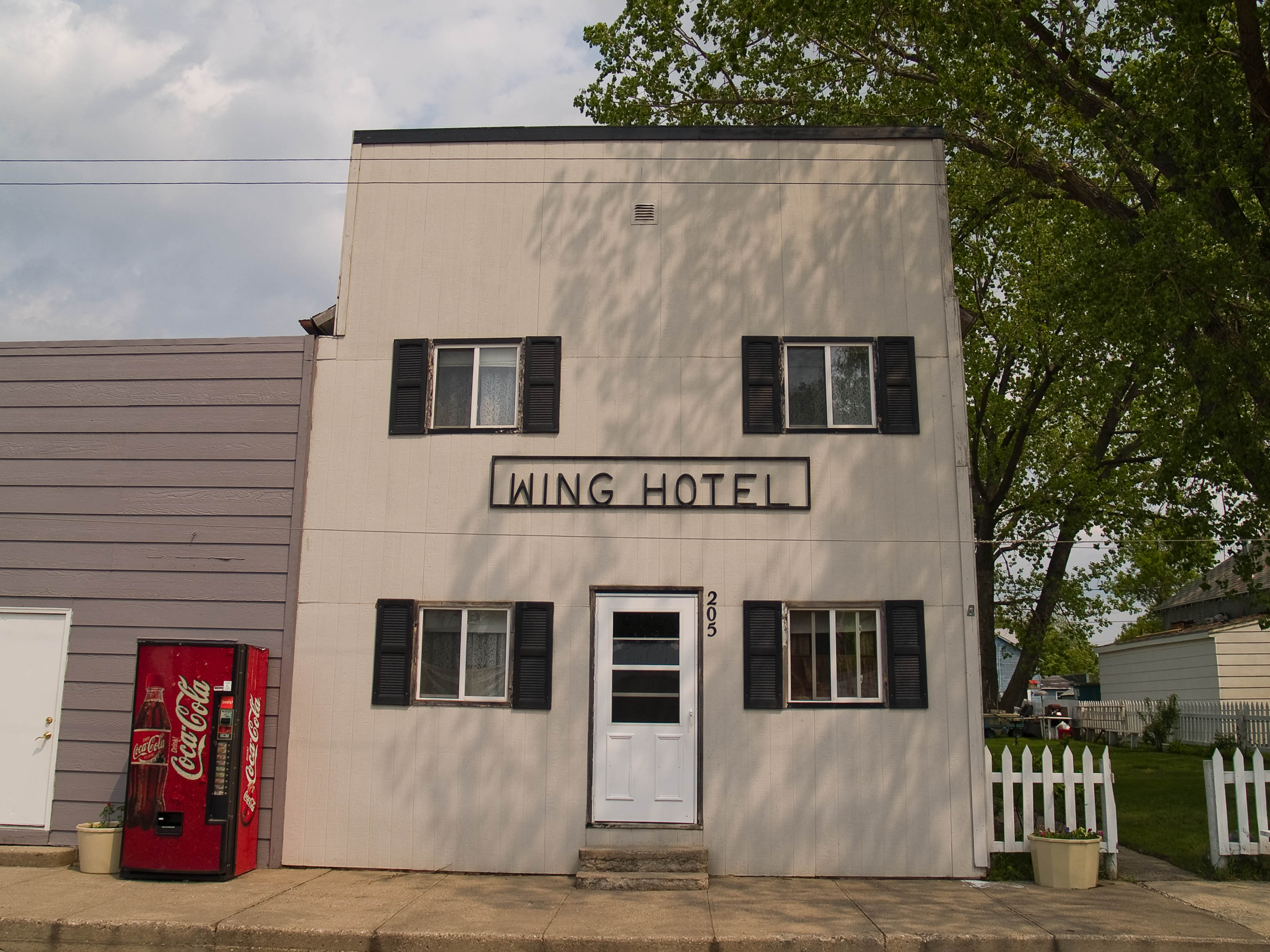
- Wing Hotel
- Interactive map of Wing, North Dakota
- Location within North Dakota
- Coordinates: 47.1423°N 100.2823°W
- Country: United States
- State: North Dakota
- County: Burleigh
- Metro: Bismarck–Mandan
- Founded: 1911
- Incorporated (village): July 7, 1921
- Incorporated (city): July 1, 1967
- Named for: Charles K. Wing

Government
  - Mayor: Julie Hein

Area
  - Total: 0.638 sq mi (1.653 km^{2})
  - Land: 0.638 sq mi (1.653 km^{2})
  - Water: 0 sq mi (0.000 km^{2}) 0.00%
- Elevation: 1,890 ft (576 m)

Population (2020)
  - Total: 132
  - Estimate (2025): 137
  - Density: 207/sq mi (79.9/km^{2})
- Time zone: UTC–6 (Central (CST))
  - Summer (DST): UTC–5 (CDT)
- ZIP Code: 58494
- Area code: 701
- FIPS code: 38-86780
- GNIS feature ID: 1036339
- Highway: ND 14, ND 36
- Website: cityofwingnd.com

Wing is a city in Burleigh County, North Dakota, United States. The population was 132 at the 2020 census, and was estimated at 137 in 2025. It is part of the "Bismarck metropolitan area" or "Bismarck–Mandan".

== History ==
Wing was founded in 1911. It was named for Charles K. Wing, who platted the area. Wing was incorporated as a village on July 7, 1921 and as a city on July 1, 1967.

== Geography ==
According to the United States Census Bureau, the city has a total area of 0.638 square miles (1.65 km^{2}), all land.

== Demographics ==
Historical population
Census	Pop.	Note	%±
1930	237		—
1940	235		−0.8%
1950	312		32.8%
1960	303		−2.9%
1970	223		−26.4%
1980	220		−1.3%
1990	208		−5.5%
2000	124		−40.4%
2010	152		22.6%
2020	132		−13.2%
2025 (est.)	137		3.8%
U.S. Decennial Census; 2020 Census

=== 2020 census ===
As of the 2020 census, there were 132 people, 69 households, and 39 families residing in the city. The population density was 206.90 inhabitants per square mile (79.9/km^{2}). There were 84 housing units at an average density of 131.66 per square mile (50.8/km^{2}). The racial makeup of the city was 92.42% White, 0.00% African American, 3.03% Native American, 0.00% Asian, 0.00% Pacific Islander, 0.76% from some other races, and 3.79% from two or more races. Hispanic or Latino people of any race were 0.00% of the population.

=== 2010 census ===
As of the 2010 census, there were 152 people, 66 households, and 41 families residing in the city. The population density was 259.39 inhabitants per square mile (100.2/km^{2}). There were 90 housing units at an average density of 153.58 per square mile (59.3/km^{2}). The racial makeup of the city was 94.08% White, 0.00% African American, 2.63% Native American, 0.00% Asian, 0.00% Pacific Islander, 0.00% from some other races, and 3.29% from two or more races. Hispanic or Latino people of any race were 0.66% of the population.

There were 66 households, 24.2% had children under the age of 18 living with them, 50.0% were married couples living together, 7.6% had a female householder with no husband present, 4.5% had a male householder with no wife present, and 37.9% were non-families. 31.8% of households were one person and 12.1% were one person aged 65 or older. The average household size was 2.30 and the average family size was 2.98.

The median age was 45.5 years. 26.3% of residents were under the age of 18; 3.3% were between the ages of 18 and 24; 19.8% were from 25 to 44; 31.6% were from 45 to 64; and 19.1% were 65 or older. The gender makeup of the city was 52.0% male and 48.0% female.

=== 2000 census ===
As of the 2000 census, there were 124 people, 68 households, and 32 families residing in the city. The population density was 210.26 inhabitants per square mile (81.2/km^{2}). There were 89 housing units at an average density of 150.91 per square mile (58.3/km^{2}). The racial makeup of the city was 99.19% White, 0.00% African American, 0.00% Native American, 0.00% Asian, 0.00% Pacific Islander, 0.00% from some other races, and 0.81% from two or more races. Hispanic or Latino people of any race were 0.00% of the population.

51.3% were of German, 16.8% Norwegian, 7.6% Scandinavian and 5.0% Finnish ancestry.

There were 68 households, 14.7% had children under the age of 18 living with them, 44.1% were married couples living together, 2.9% had a female householder with no husband present, and 51.5% were non-families. 48.5% of households were one person and 30.9% were one person aged 65 or older. The average household size was 1.82 and the average family size was 2.64.

The age distribution was 13.7% under the age of 18, 4.0% from 18 to 24, 16.9% from 25 to 44, 32.3% from 45 to 64, and 33.1% 65 or older. The median age was 53 years. For every 100 females, there were 90.8 males. For every 100 females age 18 and over, there were 87.7 males.

The median household income was $14,688 and the median income for a family was $44,167. Males had a median income of $26,750 versus $23,438 for females. The per capita income for the city was $14,970. There were 10.5% of families and 19.7% of the population living below the poverty line, including 20.0% of under eighteens and 35.7% of those over 64.

== Education ==
Wing is served by the Wing Public School District 28. It operates the Wing School. In the 2025-26 academic year, the district reported a total of 56 students.
