= Interstate 94 in North Dakota =

Section of Interstate Highway in North Dakota, United States

Interstate 94
- I-94 highlighted in red

Route information
- Maintained by NDDOT
- Length: 352.39 mi (567.12 km)
- NHS: Entire route

Major junctions
- West end: I-94 at the Montana state line in Beach
- US 85 in Belfield; I-194 in Mandan; US 83 / ND 1804 in Bismarck; ND 3 from Steele to Dawson; US 52 / US 281 in Jamestown; ND 1 near Valley City; ND 32 in Oriska; ND 18 in Casselton; US 10 / I-94 BL in West Fargo; I-29 / US 81 in Fargo
- East end: I-94 / US 52 at the Minnesota state line in Fargo

Location
- Country: United States
- State: North Dakota
- Counties: Golden Valley, Billings, Stark, Morton, Burleigh, Kidder, Stutsman, Barnes, Cass

Highway system
- Interstate Highway System; Main; Auxiliary; Suffixed; Business; Future; North Dakota State Highway System; Interstate; US; State
← ND 89	→ ND 97

Interstate 94 (I-94) runs east–west for 352.4 miles (567.1 km) through the southern half of the US state of North Dakota, from the Montana state line east to the Red River at Fargo. The route generally follows the route of the Northern Pacific Railway.

== Route description ==
Eastbound, the route enters from Montana just west of Beach and passes Medora, Dickinson, Mandan, Bismarck, Jamestown, where US 52 joins I-94, Valley City, and West Fargo before entering Fargo, where it exits the state at the Red River of the North and continues into Minnesota at Moorhead, then turns southeast to Minneapolis.

The route passes to the south of Theodore Roosevelt National Park's southern unit; access to the northern unit is by US Highway 85 (US 85) north from Belfield, exit 42. Eastbound, I-94 changes timezones at the Stark–Morton county line southwest of Hebron. Mountain time (UTC−7) is observed in Stark County (and most of the southwest corner of the state) and Central time (UTC−6) in the rest of the state.

The speed limit on I-94 is 80 mph (130 km/h) in rural areas. Between exits 152 and 161 in the Bismarck–Mandan area, the speed limit is 60 mph (97 km/h). In the Dickinson, Jamestown and Valley City areas, the speed limit is 70 mph (110 km/h). In the West Fargo–Fargo area, the speed limit is 65 mph (105 km/h) at mile 345, and 55 mph (89 km/h) from exit 346 to the Red River of the North.

I-94 has two lanes in each direction through most of the state, expanding briefly to three lanes in each direction in the Bismarck–Mandan area (from exit 155 to 156) and in Fargo from 45th Street (exit 348) to the Red River of the North.

The elevation of the highway at the Montana border is approximately 2,820 feet (860 m) above sea level, and approximately 900 feet (270 m) at its crossing of the north-flowing Red River, entering Minnesota at Moorhead.

=== Points of interest ===
The route enters at Beach and passes through the badlands near Medora and the south unit of Theodore Roosevelt National Park. A public rest area about seven miles (11 km) east of Medora provides an awe-inspiring view, especially at sunset, and an opportunity to hike through some of the scenery on the Painted Canyon Trail. Further east, I-94 provides access to the north unit of the national park, then passes through the cities of Dickinson, Mandan–Bismarck, Jamestown, and Valley City on the way to West Fargo and Fargo, where it leaves the state and crosses into Minnesota.

Through North Dakota, I-94 travels nearly due east–west, generally following both the railroad route and the former route of US 10 (called "The Old Red Trail" or "The National Parks Trail") to exit 343 in West Fargo, where the current US 10 has its western terminus.

The highway intersects with the Enchanted Highway 11 miles (18 km) east of Dickinson at exit 72 near Gladstone. At Richardton, exit 84, it passes the historic Assumption Abbey. At New Salem, exit 127, it passes Salem Sue, a 38-foot-high (12 m) sculpture of a Holstein cow that is clearly visible on the south side of the highway; the road to Sue allows a vantage point to view a panoramic landscape. It intersects with I-194 in Mandan. Between Mandan and Bismarck, I-94 crosses the Missouri River on the Grant Marsh Bridge, with a view of the historic Northern Pacific (now BNSF) Railway Bridge to the south. At Steele, it passes the world's largest sculpture of a sandhill crane, 40 feet (12 m) tall and named "Sandy", on the south side of I-94, just east of exit 200. At Jamestown, it passes the world's largest sculpture of a buffalo (actually bison) named "Dakota Thunder", 28 feet (8.5 m) in height and on the north of the highway. Valley City is known for its nickname, "City of Bridges", and is home to the Hi-Line Railroad Bridge.

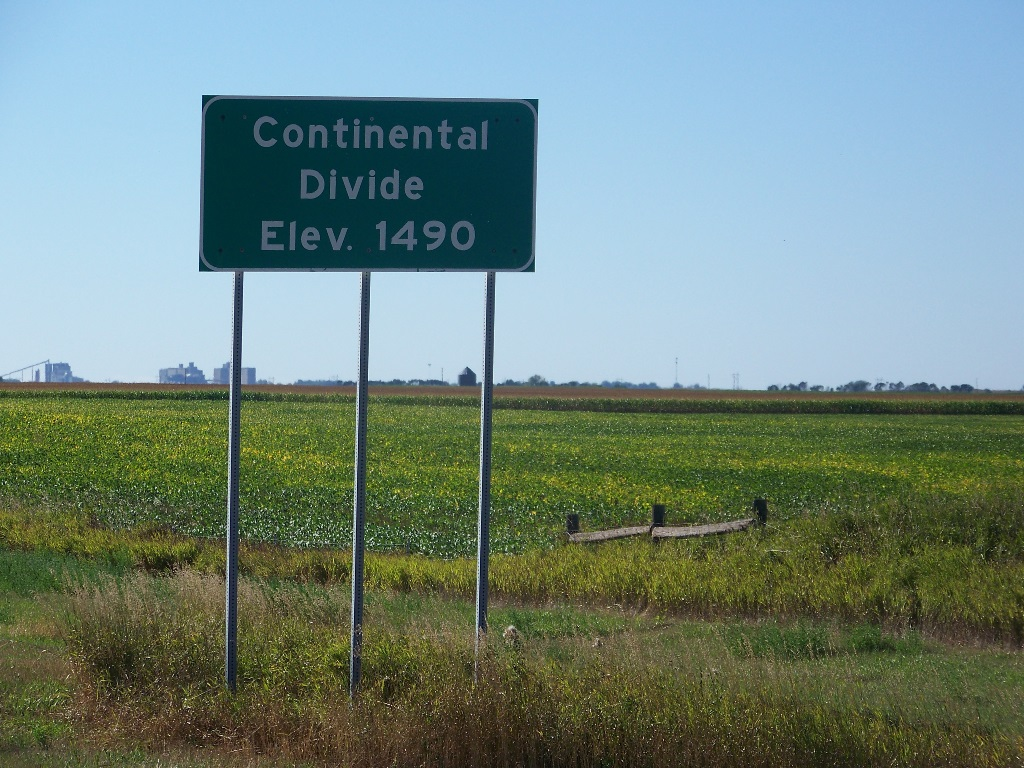
Laurentian Divide sign, westbound on I-94

At approximately milemarker 275 on the westbound lanes between Jamestown and Valley City, the highway crosses the Laurentian Divide, at an elevation of 1,490 feet (450 m) above sea level. The rivers that are west of this divide flow south into the Atlantic Ocean from the Gulf of Mexico, while the rivers that are east of the divide flow north into Hudson Bay. The James River, that flows through Jamestown, feeds into the Atlantic Ocean, while the Sheyenne River, that flows through Valley City (36 miles (58 km) east of Jamestown), feeds into Hudson Bay. A mile east of Exit 283 (ND 1 north), diagonally arranged trees and other objects implies that an exit had once existed or had been planned for that intersection.

In Fargo, a well-known yet unnamed pedestrian bridge crosses over I-94; opened 50 years ago in 1976, in time for the US Bicentennial. While providing a unique crossing for the surrounding neighborhoods, it serves as a landmark for commuters and travelers. Westbound, it is one of the first North Dakota landmarks visible from the highway.

== History ==
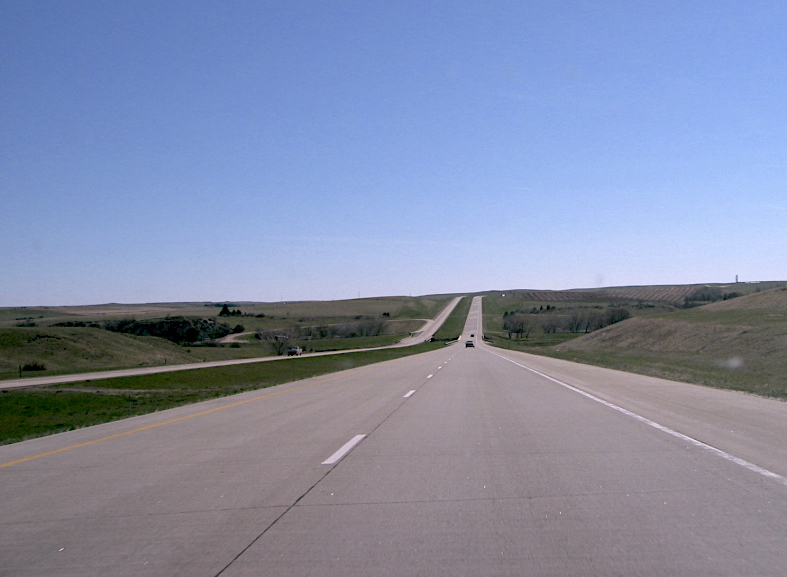
East bound on I-94, the main highway east–west through North Dakota

Through the state, I-94 follows the route once taken by US 10 west from Fargo. This route was originally called "The Old Red Trail". Prairie Public Television in North Dakota produced a documentary about US 10 and the building of I-94 through the state.

I-94 roughly follows the route of the former Northern Pacific Railway mainline (now a BNSF Railway route) across North Dakota. Many of the towns and cities that I-94 serves first grew as railroad towns in the 19th and early 20th centuries.

The first section of I-94 completed with funds from the Federal-Aid Highway Act of 1956 was a 39-mile (63 km) section between Jamestown and Valley City. It was opened on October 16, 1958, and cost $15 million (equivalent to $128 million in 2025) to construct. On October 7, 1964, a 112-mile (180 km) section of I-94 between North Dakota Highway 25 and Fryburg was dedicated, with traffic permitted to use the section from New Salem to Dickinson.

== Future ==
In January 2024, the North Dakota Department of Transportation (NDDOT) announced that they had begun a study to replace the Grant Marsh Bridge over the Missouri River in Bismarck. The bridge was built in 1965 and has not seen any major improvements since that time. NDDOT engineers will look into what some possible replacements for the bridge could be, including the possibility of demolishing the bridge and replacing it with a tunnel. NDDOT also said that the study will also include improving some of the ramps and surrounding roadways. The study is projected to be completed by the end of the year.

== Exit list ==
County	Location	mi	km	Exit	Destinations	Notes
Golden Valley	Beach Township	0.000	0.000		I-94 west – Billings	Continuation into Montana
Golden Valley	Beach	1.849	2.976	1	ND 16 – Beach	Rest area just south of exit. Access to Sidney and Williston
Golden Valley	Beach Township	7.368	11.858	7	Home on the Range	
Golden Valley	Sentinel Township	10.478	16.863	10	Camel Hump Lake, Sentinel Butte	
Golden Valley	Sentinel Township	18.452	29.696	18	Buffalo Gap	
Billings	North Billings–South Billings line	23.001	37.017	23	West River Road	Eastbound exit and westbound entrance
Billings	North Billings–South Billings line	24.315	39.131	24	I-94 BL east – Theodore Roosevelt National Park, Medora	Access to North Dakota Cowboy Hall of Fame, Theodore Roosevelt Presidential Library, Bully Pulpit Golf Course, Rough Rider State Park, Medora Musical
Billings	North Billings–South Billings line	27.243	43.843	27	I-94 BL west – Theodore Roosevelt National Park, Medora	Westbound exit and eastbound entrance; access to North Dakota Cowboy Hall of Fame, Theodore Roosevelt Presidential Library, Bully Pulpit Golf Course, Rough Rider State Park, Medora Musical
Billings	North Billings–South Billings line	32.963	53.049	32	Painted Canyon Visitor Center/Rest area	
Billings	North Billings–South Billings line	36.861	59.322	36	Fryburg	
Stark	Belfield	42.366	68.181	42	US 85 – Watford City, Belfield	Interchange with Theodore Roosevelt Expressway; access to Williston; access to Theodore Roosevelt National Park (north unit); access to Bowman
Stark	West Stark–Dickinson North line	51.476	82.843	51	South Heart	
Stark	Dickinson North	56.414	90.790	56	ND 22 north (North Bypass)	
Stark	Dickinson	59.485	95.732	59	I-94 BL east / ND 22 south (South Bypass) / 30th Avenue West – Dickinson	Eastern end of ND 22 Bypass concurrency; Access to Dickinson State University, CHI St. Alexius Health Dickinson Medical Center; access to Patterson Lake Recreation Area
Stark	Dickinson	61.476	98.936	61	ND 22 – Killdeer, Dickinson	Access to Dickinson Theodore Roosevelt Regional Airport, Biesiot Activities Center, Manning and New England
Stark	Dickinson	64.204	103.326	64	I-94 BL west – Dickinson City Center	
Stark	Dickinson North			Former Green River rest area		
Stark	Dickinson North–East Stark line	72.253	116.280	72	Gladstone, Lefor	Enchanted Highway exit; access to Regent
Stark	East Stark	78.901	126.979	78	Taylor	
Stark	East Stark	84.885	136.609	84	ND 8 – Richardton, Mott	Access to Schnell Recreation Area, Assumption Abbey
Stark	East Stark	90.110	145.018	90	No name exit	
Morton	West Morton	97.188	156.409	97	Hebron	
Morton	West Morton	102.914	165.624	102	Glen Ullin, Hebron	Half-cloverleaf exit; signed for Glen Ullin eastbound and Hebron westbound; access to Lake Tschida
Morton	West Morton	108.354	174.379	108	Glen Ullin	
Morton	West Morton	110.367	177.618	110	ND 49 – Beulah, Glen Ullin	Access to Lake Tschida
Morton	West Morton	113.389	182.482	113	No name exit	
Morton	West Morton	117.197	188.610	117	No name exit	
Morton	West Morton	120.204	193.450	120	No name exit	Access to Danzig Dam
Morton	West Morton	123.200	198.271	123	Almont	
Morton	New Salem	127.662	205.452	127	ND 31 north – Hazen, New Salem	Access to Garrison Dam, Center, Stanton, Knife River Indian Villages
Morton	West Morton–East Morton line	134.115	215.837	134	Sweet Briar Lake, Judson	Scenic View just east of exit on westbound side
Morton	East Morton	140.118	225.498	140	No name exit	Access to Crown Butte Dam
Morton	East Morton	147.183	236.868	147	I-94 BL east to ND 6 – Mandan ND 25 north – Center, Stanton	Western terminus of I-94 BL; southern terminus of ND 25, Local Truck Route; signed for Mandan eastbound, signed for Center and Stanton westbound
Morton	Mandan	152.329	245.150	152	Sunset Drive – Mandan	Access to City Center
Morton	Mandan	153.988	247.820	153	ND 1806 (Mandan Avenue)	Access to North Dakota Veterans Cemetery, Fort Lincoln State Park, Dacotah Centennial Park
Morton	Mandan	155.026	249.490	155	Main Street to I-94 BL / ND 6	Westbound exit and eastbound entrance; access to North Dakota Veterans Cemetery, Fort Lincoln State Park, Dacotah Centennial Park
Morton	Mandan	156.069	251.169	156	Bismarck Expressway (I-194) to I-94 BL – Bismarck, Mandan	Western terminus of Bismarck Expwy.; access to Bismarck Municipal Airport, Dakota Zoo, University of Mary, unsigned I-194 and ND 810
Missouri River				Grant Marsh Bridge		
Burleigh	Bismarck	157.344	253.221	157	Divide Avenue	Modified half-cloverleaf interchange; access to Tyler Parkway, Bismarck State College, Gateway to Science
Burleigh	Bismarck	159.419	256.560	159	US 83 north (ND 1804) – Bismarck, Minot	Western end of US 83 concurrency; access to State Capitol, North Dakota Heritage Center, CHI St. Alexius Health Bismarck, Sanford Health, Lewis and Clark Interpretive Center (Washburn), Wilton
Burleigh	Bismarck	161.439	259.811	161	Bismarck Expressway (I-94 BL west) Lincoln / Centennial Road	Eastern terminus of I-94 BL/Bismarck Expwy; signed as exits 161A (south) and 161B (north) eastbound; access to Bismarck Municipal Airport, Dakota Zoo, University of Mary
Burleigh	Menoken	170.519	274.424	170	Menoken	Access to McDowell Dam
Burleigh	McKenzie Township	176.501	284.051	176	McKenzie	
Burleigh	Sterling Township	182.488	293.686	182	US 83 south / ND 14 north – Wing, Sterling	Eastern end of US 83 concurrency, southern end of ND 14
Burleigh	Driscoll Township	190.110	305.952	190	Driscoll	
Kidder	Pleasant Hill Township	195.090	313.967	195	No name exit	
Kidder	Steele	200.760	323.092	200	ND 3 north – Tuttle, Steele	Western end of ND 3 concurrency
Kidder	Woodlawn–Sibley township line	205.071	330.030	205	Robinson	
Kidder	Dawson	208.702	335.873	208	ND 3 south – Dawson	Eastern end of ND 3 concurrency; access to Camp Grassick
Kidder	Tappen	214.126	344.602	214	Tappen	
Kidder	Crystal Springs–Tappen township line	217.145	349.461	217	Pettibone	
Kidder	Crystal Springs Township	221.733	356.845	221	Crystal Springs	Access to Crystal Springs Lake
Stutsman	St. Paul Township	228.321	367.447	228	ND 30 south – Streeter	
Stutsman	Chicago Township	230.288	370.613	230	Medina	Access to Woodworth
Stutsman	Chicago Township	233.343	375.529	233	No name exit	
Stutsman	Cleveland	238.793	384.300	238	Cleveland, Gackle	
Stutsman	Windsor–Moon Lake township line	242.672	390.543	242	Windsor	
Stutsman	Windsor–Moon Lake township line	245.191	394.597	245	No name exit	
Stutsman	Eldridge–Lippert township line	248.991	400.712	248	No name exit	
Stutsman	Eldridge–Lippert township line	251.686	405.049	251	Eldridge	
Stutsman	Jamestown	256.224	412.353	256	US 52 Truck west (By-pass) / US 281 Truck north (By-pass)	Western end of US 52 Truck Byp./US 281 Truck Byp. concurrency; access to Jamestown Regional Medical Center, Anne Carlsen Center
Stutsman	Jamestown	257.002	413.605	257	Jamestown	Eastbound left exit and westbound entrance; former east I-94 Bus.
Stutsman	Jamestown	258.055	415.299	258	US 52 west / US 281 – Jamestown US 52 Truck ends (By-pass) / US 281 Truck ends (By-pass)	Eastern end of US 52 Truck Byp./US 281 Truck Byp. concurrency; western end of US 52 concurrency; access to University of Jamestown, Frontier Village
Stutsman	Jamestown	260.125	418.631	260	Jamestown	Access to State Hospital, former west I-94 Bus., former west US 52
Stutsman	Jamestown	262.361	422.229	262	Bloom	Access to Jamestown Regional Airport
Stutsman	Spiritwood–Winfield township line	269.355	433.485	269	Spiritwood	
Barnes	Eckelson–Mansfield township line	272.369	438.335	272	No name exit	Access to Urbana
Barnes	Eckelson–Mansfield township line	276.385	444.799	276	Eckelson, Marion	
Barnes	Potter Township	281.640	453.256	281	Sanborn, Litchville	
Barnes	Potter Township	283.139	455.668	283	ND 1 north – Rogers	Western end of ND 1 concurrency
Barnes	Hobart Township	288.636	464.515	288	ND 1 south – Verona, Oakes	Eastern end of ND 1 concurrency; access to Fort Ransom State Park
Barnes	Valley City	290.803	468.002	290	I-94 BL east – Valley City	
Barnes	Valley City	292.072	470.044	292	Valley City	Access to Baldhill Dam, Valley City State University, Kathryn, Sheyenne River Valley National Scenic Byway
Barnes	Valley City	294.283	473.603	294	I-94 BL west – Valley City	
Barnes	Alta Township	296.741	477.558	296	No name exit	Access to Peak
Barnes	Alta Township	298.746	480.785	298	No name exit	Access to Cuba
Barnes	Oriska	302.712	487.168	302	ND 32 – Oriska, Fingal	
Barnes	Tower City	307.679	495.161	307	Tower City	
Cass	Hill Township	310.456	499.631	310	No name exit	
Cass	Hill–Howes township line	314.863	506.723	314	ND 38 north – Buffalo, Alice	Southern terminus of ND 38; continues south as CR 38
Cass	Howes Township	317.846	511.524	317	Ayr	
Cass	Howes–Gill township line	320.837	516.337	320	Embden	
Cass	Gill Township	322.827	519.540	322	Absaraka	
Cass	Gill Township	324.821	522.749	324	Wheatland, Chaffee	
Cass	Everest Township	328.710	529.007	328	Lynchburg	
Cass	Casselton	331.226	533.057	331	ND 18 – Casselton, Leonard	Access to Governors Drive, Casselton Reservoir, Casselton Robert Miller Regional Airport
Cass	Mapleton	338.737	545.144	338	Mapleton	Access to Durbin
Cass	Mapleton Township	340.717	548.331	340	Kindred	Access to Davenport
Cass	Mapleton Township	342.721	551.556	342	No name exit	
Cass	West Fargo	343.803	553.297	343	US 10 / I-94 BL east (Main Avenue) – West Fargo, Fargo	Western terminus of US 10
Cass	West Fargo	346.442	557.544	346	Sheyenne Street	Signed as exits 346A (south) and 346B (north) westbound; local trucks only; access to Horace
Cass	West Fargo	347.786	559.707	347	Veterans Boulevard / 9th Street East	Signed as 9th Street East north of I-94 and Veterans Boulevard south of I-94
Cass	Fargo	348.481	560.826	348	45th Street	Access to Red River Zoo
Cass	Fargo	349.584	562.601	349	I-29 / US 81 – Grand Forks, Sioux Falls	Signed as exits 349A (south) and 349B (north); I-29 exit 63; access to Wahpeton
Cass	Fargo	350.586	564.213	350	25th Street	
Cass	Fargo	351.590	565.829	351	US 81 Bus. (University Drive) – Downtown Fargo	
Red River of the North		352.454	567.220	North Dakota–Minnesota line		
Red River of the North		352.454	567.220		I-94 east (US 52 east) – Minneapolis	Continuation into Minnesota
1.000 mi = 1.609 km; 1.000 km = 0.621 mi: Closed/former; Concurrency terminus; Incomplete access

== Auxiliary routes ==
- I-194—a short spur route into Bismarck (Bismarck Expressway); unsigned

== Business routes ==
- I-94 BL Medora Business Loop—Pacific Avenue
- I-94 BL Dickinson Business Loop—30th Avenue West, Villard Street, and 36th Street Southwest
- I-94 BL Mandan–Bismarck Business Loop—Business Loop 94, Main Street, Memorial Highway, Main Avenue, and Bismarck Expressway
- I-94 BL former Jamestown Business Loop- 17th Street Southwest, Business Loop West, US 52/281, 10th Street SE, 12th Avenue Southeast, Business Loop East
- I-94 BL Valley City Business Loop—Main Street
- I-94 BL West Fargo-Fargo–Moorhead Business Loop—Main Avenue, 24th Avenue South, and 34th Street South

Interstate 94
Previous state: Montana	North Dakota	Next state: Minnesota
