= North Dakota Highway 10 =

Highway in North Dakota

North Dakota Highway 10
- ND 10 highlighted in red

Route information
- Maintained by NDDOT
- Length: 14.552 mi (23.419 km)

Major junctions
- West end: I-94 / US 52 southwest of Casselton
- ND 18 in Casselton
- East end: I-94 / US 52 in West Fargo

Location
- Country: United States
- State: North Dakota
- Counties: Cass

Highway system
- North Dakota State Highway System; Interstate; US; State
← US 10	→ ND 11

North Dakota Highway 10 (ND 10) is a 14.552-mile-long (23.419 km) east–west state highway in the U.S. state of North Dakota. It is an unsigned state highway. ND 10's western terminus is at Interstate 94 (I-94) and U.S. Route 52 (US 52) southwest of Casselton, and the eastern terminus is at I-94 and US 52 in West Fargo. The highway was formerly part of U.S. Route 10 (US 10).

== Major intersections ==
The entire route is in Cass County.

Location	mi	km	Destinations	Notes
	0.000	0.000	I-94 / US 52	Western terminus, I-94 Exit 328
Casselton	2.541	4.089	ND 18 north	Western end of ND 18 concurrency
	2.684	4.319	I-94 / US 52 – Fargo, Valley City, Bismarck	I-94 Exit 331
	2.830	4.554	ND 18 south – Leonard	Eastern end of ND 18 concurrency
West Fargo	14.552	23.419	I-94 / US 52 – Fargo, Bismarck	Eastern terminus, I-94 Exit 342
1.000 mi = 1.609 km; 1.000 km = 0.621 mi
