= Interstate 94 =

Interstate Highway across the upper Midwestern US

Interstate 94
- I-94 highlighted in red

Route information
- Length: 1,555.43 mi (2,503.22 km)
- Existed: August 14, 1957–present
- NHS: Entire route

Major junctions
- West end: I-90 / US 87 / US 212 in Lockwood, MT
- I-29 / US 81 in Fargo, ND; I-35W in Minneapolis, MN; I-35E in St. Paul, MN; I-39 / I-90 from Portage to Madison, WI; I-41 / I-43 in Milwaukee, WI; I-55 in Chicago, IL; I-65 in Gary, IN; I-80 / I-90 / US 6 in Lake Station, IN; I-69 in Marshall, MI; I-75 in Detroit, MI
- East end: Highway 402 at Canadian border on Blue Water Bridge in Port Huron, MI

Location
- Country: United States
- States: Montana, North Dakota, Minnesota, Wisconsin, Illinois, Indiana, Michigan

Highway system
- Interstate Highway System; Main; Auxiliary; Suffixed; Business; Future

Interstate 94 (I-94) is an east–west Interstate Highway connecting the Great Lakes and northern Great Plains regions of the United States. Its western terminus is just east of Billings, Montana, at a junction with I-90; its eastern terminus is in Port Huron, Michigan, where it meets with I-69 and crosses the Blue Water Bridge into Sarnia, Ontario, Canada, where the route becomes Ontario Highway 402. It thus lies along the primary overland route from Seattle (via I-90) to Toronto (via Ontario Highway 401) and is the only east–west Interstate Highway to have a direct connection to Canada. It is the longest Interstate whose route number is not divisible by 5.

I-94 intersects with I-90 several times: at its western terminus; Tomah to Madison in Wisconsin; in Chicago, Illinois; and in Lake Station, Indiana. Major cities that I-94 connects to are Billings, Bismarck, Fargo, St. Cloud, Minneapolis–Saint Paul, Eau Claire, Madison, Milwaukee, Chicago, and Detroit.

== Route description ==
Lengths
	mi	km
MT	219.38	353.06
ND	352.39	567.12
MN	259.49	417.61
WI	341.02	548.82
IL	61.53	99.02
IN	46.13	74.24
MI	275.49	443.36
Total	1,555.43	2,503.22

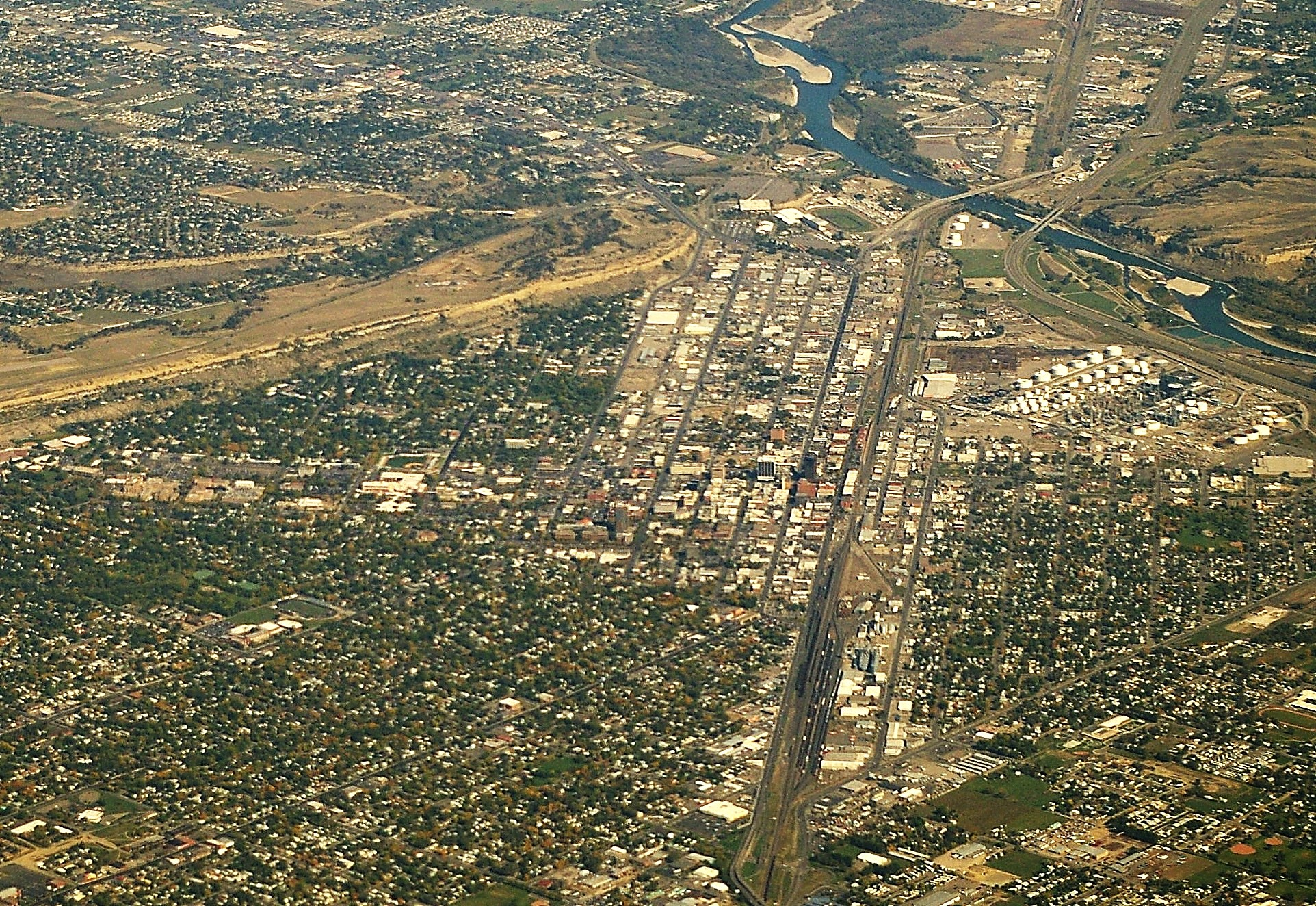
Part of Billings, Montana, the western terminus of I-94

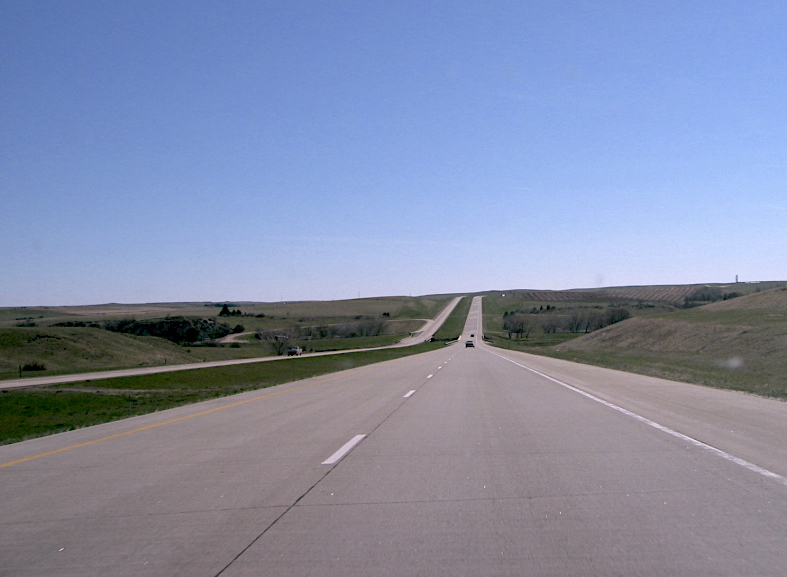
Eastbound on I-94, the main highway east–west through North Dakota

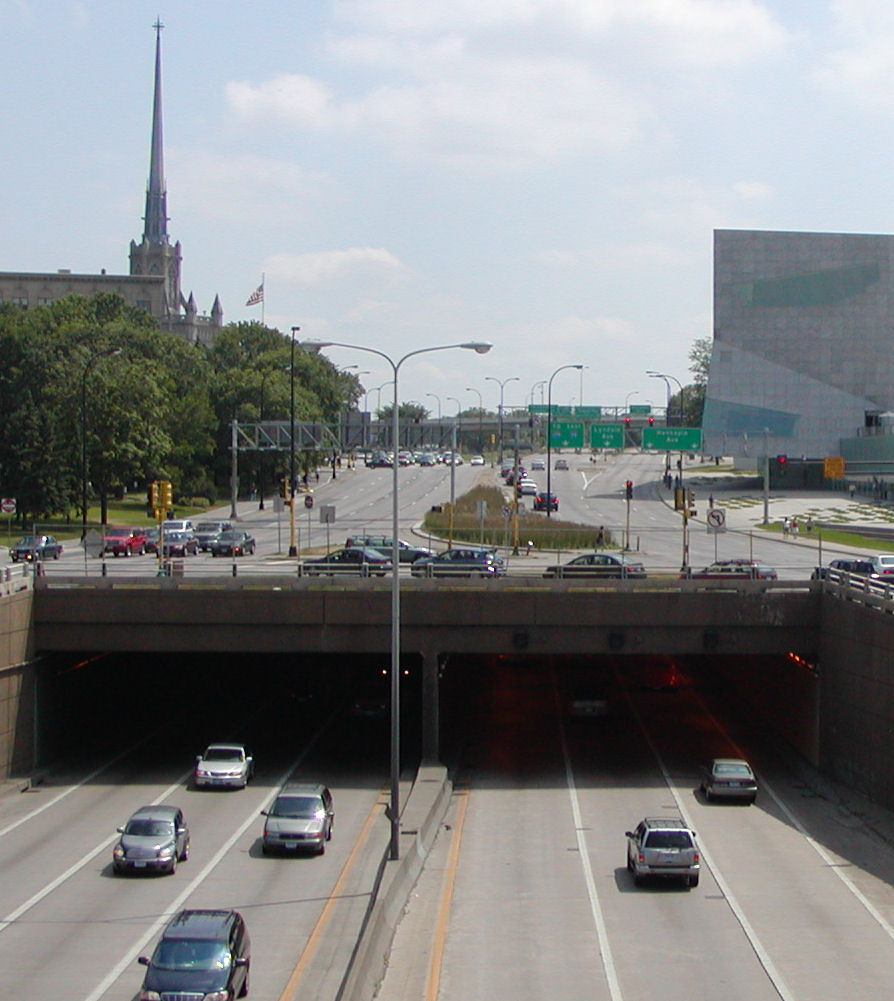
Lowry Hill Tunnel in Minneapolis, Minnesota

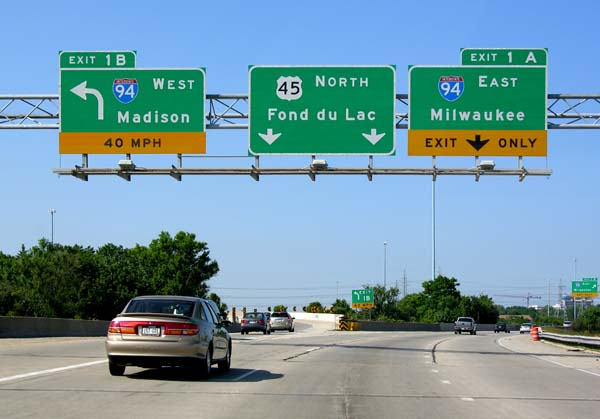
I-894 west at the Zoo Interchange (I-94) in 2008

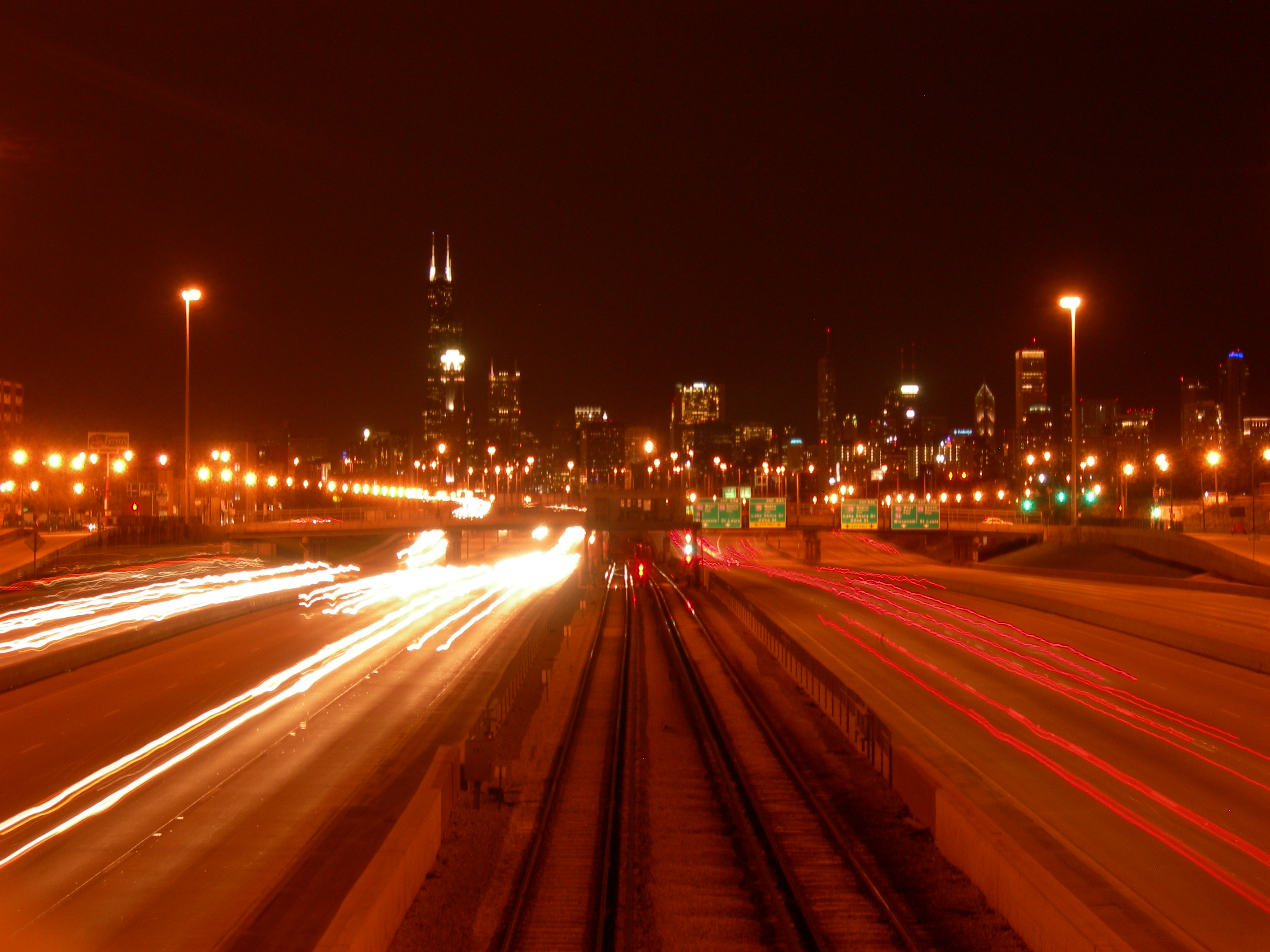
Dan Ryan Expressway in Chicago

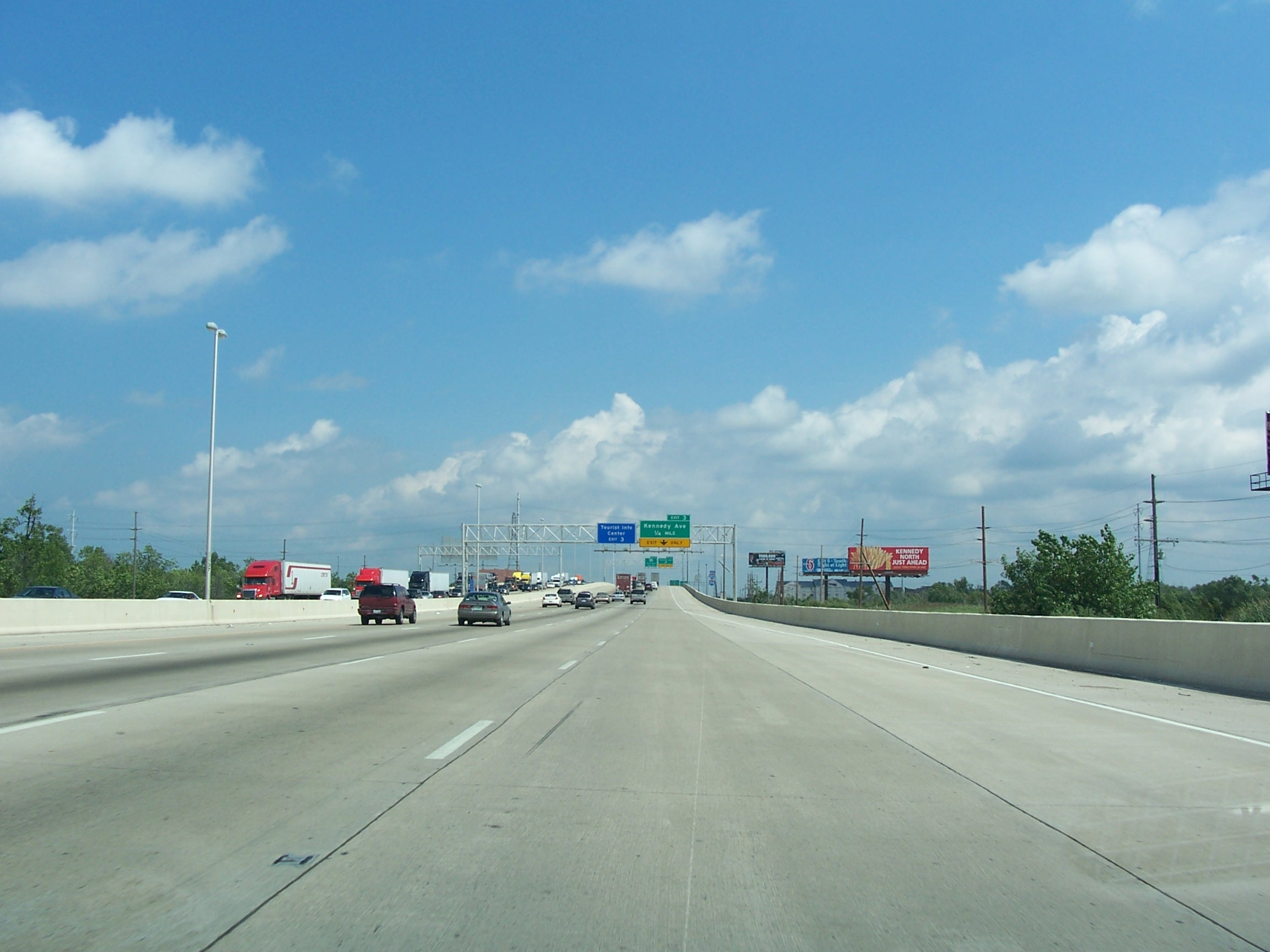
Borman Expressway (I-80/I-94) in Hammond, Indiana, approaching exit 3

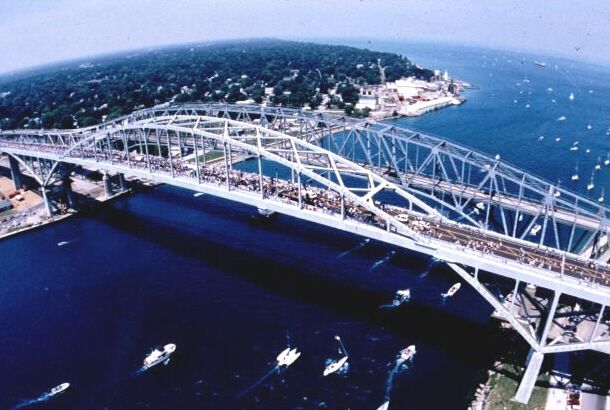
I-69/I-94's eastern terminus on the Blue Water Bridge at the Canadian border in Port Huron, Michigan, connecting it to Highway 402 in Point Edward, Ontario

=== Montana ===
I-94 begins at Billings and travels northeastward toward Miles City and Glendive before exiting the state to the east. I-94 links seven counties, which are Yellowstone, Treasure, Rosebud, Custer, Prairie, Dawson, and Wibaux counties and passes near or through Forsyth, Miles City and Glendive while connecting with I-90 in Billings. The highway is notable for following the Yellowstone River from Billings through Glendive. Beyond the western terminus of I-94, I-90 connects westbound I-94 travelers to points west such as Butte; Missoula; Coeur d'Alene, Idaho; Spokane, Washington; and Seattle, Washington.

=== North Dakota ===
The route enters at Beach and passes through the Badlands near Medora (near the Theodore Roosevelt National Park South Unit). Further east, at Belfield and US 85, I-94 provides access to the North Unit of Theodore Roosevelt National Park, then passes through the cities of Dickinson, Mandan, Bismarck, Jamestown, and Valley City on the way to West Fargo and Fargo, where it leaves the state and crosses into Minnesota. Throughout the state, the route generally travels relatively straight east and west following both the railroad route and the former route of US Route 10 (US 10, called "The Old Red Trail") where its western terminus is at exit 343 in West Fargo.

The highway intersects with the Enchanted Highway 11 miles (18 km) east of Dickinson at exit 72 near Gladstone. At Richardton, it passes near the historic Assumption Abbey. At New Salem, it passes Salem Sue, a 38-foot-high (12 m) sculpture of a Holstein cow and is clearly visible from I-94 on the south side of the road. A drive up the road to Sue will take visitors to a vantage point where they can see a panoramic landscape for many miles. Between Mandan and Bismarck, I-94 crosses the Missouri River with a view of the Northern Pacific/BNSF Railway Bridge on the south side of the road. At Steele, it passes the world's largest sculpture of a sandhill crane (named Sandy), which is 40 feet (12 m) tall and visible from I-94 on the south side of the road, just to the east of exit 200. At Jamestown, it passes the world's largest sculpture of the buffalo (actually bison) named "Dakota Thunder", which is 28 feet (8.5 m) tall and is visible from I-94 on the north side of the road. US 52 is concurrent with I-94 from Jamestown to the Minnesota state line. At approximately mile marker 275 on the westbound lanes between Jamestown and Valley City, there is a small green sign marking the Laurentian Divide, which marks a continental divide where rivers south of the divide drain into the Gulf of Mexico, while the rivers north flow into the Arctic Ocean. The highway reaches West Fargo and Fargo, before the Red River.

=== Minnesota ===
Leaving Fargo and entering Moorhead, Minnesota, I-94/US 52 crosses the Red River. East of the Moorhead Municipal Airport, the Interstate travels in a northwest–southeast trajectory past Fergus Falls, Alexandria, Sauk Centre, St. Cloud, and Monticello on the way to the Twin Cities and eastward out of the state.

The road crosses the Mississippi River in Minneapolis between the Prospect Park and Seward neighborhoods. Here, it crosses over the only true gorge along the Mississippi's entire 2,350-mile (3,780 km) length, where steep bluffs extend to the waterline. The highway joins Minneapolis and Saint Paul together where it meets Minnesota State Highway 280 (MN 280). US 52 leaves I-94 after running concurrently with I-94 from the North Dakota state line and heads southbound toward Rochester. In the Twin Cities, the routing of the highway is politically charged, primarily through many historic working-class and Black neighborhoods. In Saint Paul, the routing of I-94 is set through and displaces the historic Rondo neighborhood, which prior to the highway construction was the largest Black community in Saint Paul.

East of Saint Paul, I-94 leaves Minnesota between Lakeland, Minnesota, and Hudson, Wisconsin, while crossing the St. Croix River.

=== Wisconsin ===
I-94 enters Wisconsin east of the Twin Cities at Hudson. It traverses the hilly terrain of northwest Wisconsin, crossing the Red Cedar River near Menomonie. East of Menomonie, I-94 junctions with WIS 29, a major East–West expressway connecting I-94 with Wausau, and Green Bay. It then passes Eau Claire before turning southeastward and joining with I-90 in Tomah. Southeast of Tomah, the highway passes the major tourist area of Wisconsin Dells. Here, vacationers can find a multitude of water parks, camping, amusement parks, zoos, river excursions, as well as lodging and shopping. Further southeast, I-94 joins up with I-39 in Portage at the base of Cascade Mountain, a popular ski area. Just south of Cascade Mountain, I-94 crosses over the Wisconsin River. I-94 leaves I-90 and I-39 east of the state capitol of Madison and resumes its easterly path toward Milwaukee. I-94 weaves its way into Downtown Milwaukee before turning south and heading to Chicago, entering Illinois at Pleasant Prairie.

=== Illinois ===
In the state of Illinois, I-94 runs south from Wisconsin to Indiana via downtown Chicago. It is tolled on the Tri-State Tollway to the I-94/I-294 split; it then runs east to the Edens Expressway, where it soon joins again with I-90 on the Kennedy Expressway and turns south through the city of Chicago. I-90 leaves south of downtown Chicago to the Chicago Skyway. At I-80, I-94 runs east to Indiana on the Kingery Expressway.

=== Indiana ===
In the state of Indiana, I-94 runs east from Illinois concurrently with I-80. It crosses I-90 (Indiana Toll Road), where I-80 joins I-90 east toward Ohio. I-94 continues northeasterly, paralleling the Lake Michigan shoreline into Michigan. The 55-mile-per-hour (89 km/h) speed limit used to continue east of exit 26; now it ends a mile (1.6 km) east of I-80/I-90, where the speed limit goes up to 70 mph (110 km/h) on eastbound I-94. Between milemarkers 0.0 and 15.5, the highway is also posted along with I-80. Between milemarkers 15.6 and 19.0, I-94 is posted alone.

=== Michigan ===
I-94 runs north along Lake Michigan to St. Joseph and Benton Harbor where it meets US 31 and I-196 before heading east toward Detroit. It turns northeast to Port Huron where it meets I-69 and ends at the Blue Water Bridge, where it becomes Ontario Highway 402 in Point Edward, Ontario.

== History ==
The first section of I-94 completed with Interstate funds (under the Federal-Aid Highway Act of 1956) was a 12-mile (19 km) section between Jamestown and Valley City, North Dakota, in 1958.

North of Chicago, I-94 has been widened from six to eight lanes from Illinois Route 22 (IL 22, Half Day Road) to just south of the Wisconsin state line at IL 173 and 95th Street to 159th Street. Construction began in 2009 to completely rebuild I-94, including expansion to eight lanes, from the Wisconsin–Illinois border through the Mitchell Interchange in Milwaukee. This construction is expected to be completed in 2021.

In 2005, the I-94 bridge over the Crow River near St. Michael, Minnesota, about 35 miles (56 km) northwest of Minneapolis, was rebuilt. In 2006, a project to widen I-94 east of Downtown Saint Paul between MN 120 and McKnight Road from four to six lanes was completed. The interchange at 95th Avenue North (Hennepin County Road 30) in Maple Grove, Minnesota, was replaced by the new Maple Grove Parkway (later designated as Hennepin County Road 121) between 2006 and 2007. A separate overpass bridge was built between 2001 and 2002, while a new, wider bridge replaced the two-lane bridge there, which was demolished in July 2006.

The expanded Marquette Interchange in Downtown Milwaukee was completed in August 2008 at a cost of $810 million (equivalent to $1.16 billion in 2024).

In Detroit, I-94 was routed over the existing Edsel Ford Freeway and remained signed as such until the late 1980s when Michigan deemphasized proper names on Interstate guide signs. Its interchange with the Lodge Freeway, built in 1953, is significant as the first full-speed freeway-to-freeway interchange built in the US.

From September 2007 to October 2008, the Minnesota Department of Transportation (MnDOT) added a temporary extra lane to I-94 between northbound I-35W and Minnesota State Highway 280 in the Twin Cities to help relieve traffic congestion caused by the collapse of the I-35W Mississippi River bridge. As a result, this portion of I-94 was not up to Interstate Highway standards during this time period.

== Major intersections ==
Montana
I-90 / US 87 / US 212 in Billings
US 12 near Miles City
North Dakota
US 85 in Belfield
I-194 in Bismarck (unsigned, carried by the Bismarck Expressway)
US 83 in Bismarck
US 52 / US 281 in Jamestown; US 52 is concurrent until St. Paul, Minnesota; US 281 is concurrent for 1 mile (1.6 km)
US 10 in West Fargo
I-29 / US 81 in Fargo
Minnesota
US 75 in Moorhead
US 59 in Fergus Falls; concurrent for 11 miles (18 km)
US 71 in Sauk Centre
US 169 in Brooklyn Park
I-494 / I-694 in Maple Grove
I-394 in Minneapolis; the spur route from Minneapolis to Minnetonka
I-35W in Minneapolis; concurrent for less than one mile (1.6 km)
I-35E / US 10 in St. Paul; I-35E is concurrent for less than one-half mile (0.80 km); US 10 is concurrent for 2 miles (3.2 km)
US 61 in St. Paul; concurrent for 1 mile (1.6 km)
I-494 / I-694 in Oakdale
Wisconsin
US 63 in Baldwin
US 12 near Elk Mound
US 53 in Eau Claire
US 10 in Osseo
I-90 in Tomah; concurrent until Madison
US 12 near Lake Delton
I-39 in Portage; concurrent until Madison
US 51 near Windsor
US 151 in Madison
US 18 in Waukesha
I-41 / I-894 / US 41 / US 45 in West Allis
I-43 / I-794 in Milwaukee; I-43 is concurrent for 6 miles (9.7 km)
I-41 / I-43 / I-894 / US 41 in Milwaukee; I-41/US 41 are concurrent until Zion, Illinois
Illinois
I-294 in Deerfield
US 41 in Northbrook; concurrent until Wilmette
US 14 in Chicago
I-90 in Chicago; concurrent for 16 miles (26 km)
I-290 in Chicago
I-55 in Chicago
US 12 / US 20 in Chicago
I-57 in Chicago
US 6 in South Holland
I-80 / I-294 in South Holland; I-80 is concurrent until Lake Station, Indiana
US 6 in Calumet City; concurrent until Lake Station, Indiana
Indiana
US 41 in Hammond
I-65 in Gary
I-80 / I-90 in Lake Station
US 20 in Burns Harbor
US 421 near Michigan City
US 20 / US 35 near Michigan City
Michigan
US 12 near New Buffalo
I-196 / US 31 near Benton Harbor
US 131 in Kalamazoo
I-194 in Battle Creek
I-69 in Marshall
US 127 in Jackson
US 23 near Ann Arbor
US 12 in Ypsilanti; concurrent for 4 miles (6.4 km)
I-275 in Romulus
US 24 in Taylor
US 12 in Dearborn
I-96 in Detroit
I-75 in Detroit
I-696 in Roseville
I-69 in Port Huron; concurrent for 4 miles (6.4 km)
Highway 402 at Canadian border

== Auxiliary routes ==
Source: FHWA

- Bismarck, North Dakota: I-194 (unsigned)
- Minneapolis–Saint Paul, Minnesota: I-394, I-494, I-694
- Milwaukee, Wisconsin: I-794, I-894
- Chicago, Illinois: I-294
- Battle Creek, Michigan: I-194
