= U.S. Route 10 in North Dakota =

Segment of American highway

U.S. Highway 10
- US 10 highlighted in red

Route information
- Maintained by NDDOT
- Length: 8.043 mi (12.944 km)
- Existed: 1926–present

Major junctions
- West end: I-94 / US 52 near West Fargo
- I-29 / US 81 in Fargo
- East end: US 10 / I-94 BL in Moorhead, MN

Location
- Country: United States
- State: North Dakota
- Counties: Cass

Highway system
- United States Numbered Highway System; List; Special; Divided; North Dakota State Highway System; Interstate; US; State
← ND 9	→ ND 10

U.S. Highway 10 (US 10) in North Dakota runs 8.042 miles (12.942 km) from Interstate 94 (I-94)/US 52 near West Fargo east through Fargo before crossing the Red River of the North and entering Moorhead, Minnesota. US 10 serves as a primary east–west corridor through the Fargo–Moorhead (Main Avenue) and is concurrent with I-94 Business for its entire length in North Dakota.

== Route description ==
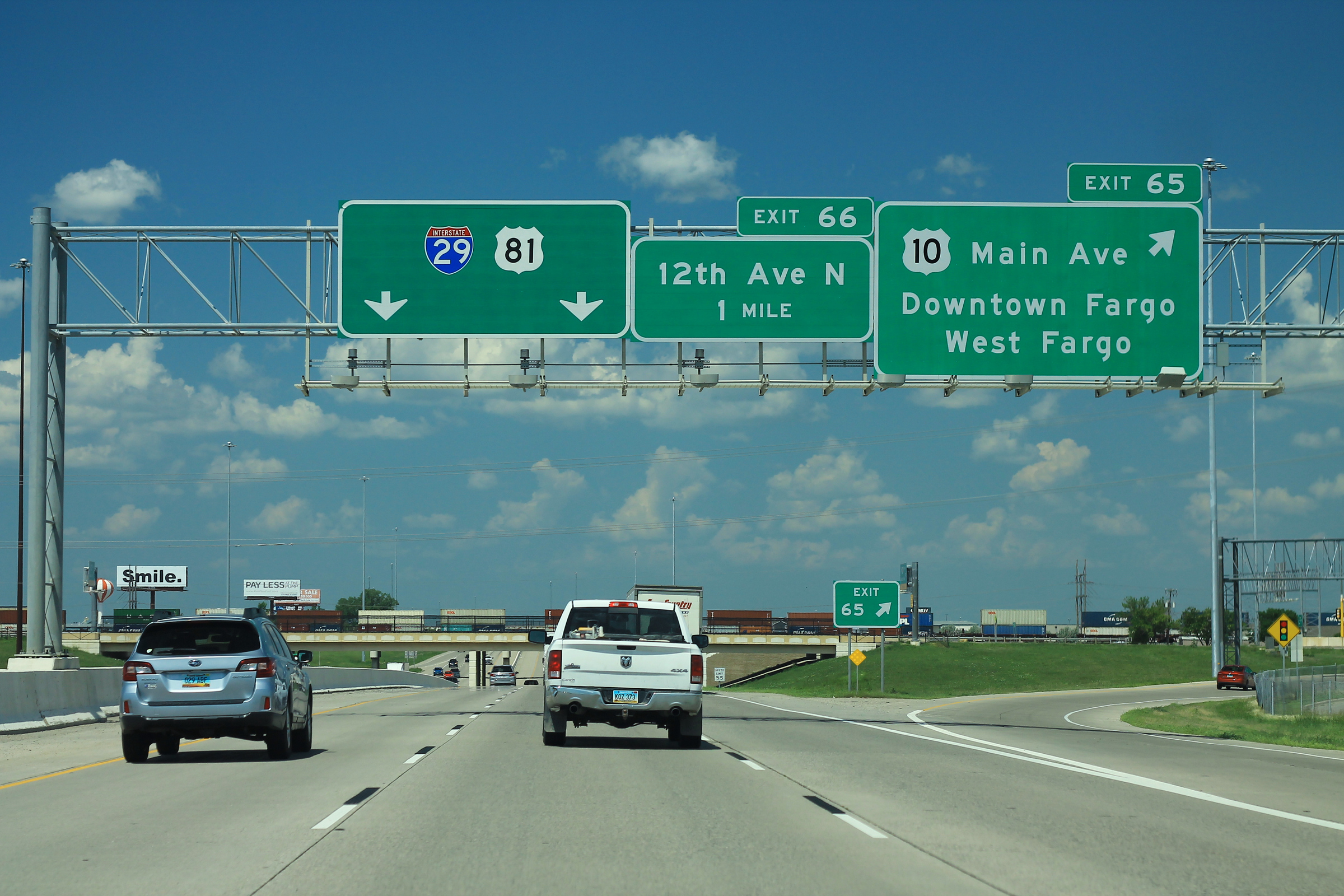
Crossing of US 10 as seen from I-29/US 81 near West Fargo

US 10 begins as a four-lane highway with a median at a trumpet interchange with I-94/US 52 (exit 343) just west of West Fargo. Once entering West Fargo, US 10 runs on Main Avenue (also I-94 Bus.), passes to the north of Bonanzaville, USA, a history museum complex before entering the downtown area of West Fargo. Continuing east, US 10 enters Fargo at its intersection with 45th Street and then intersects I-29/US 81 (exit 65) at a partial cloverleaf interchange a mile (1.6 km) later. East of this interchange, US 10 loses its median but remains two lanes each direction after intersecting 25th Street. After this intersection, US 10 curves slightly southeast and runs along the Northern Transcon railroad tracks, heading into downtown. In downtown Fargo, US 10 passes to the south of the former Fargo station, which is listed on the National Register of Historic Places. At the east end of downtown Fargo, US 10 intersects 2nd Street at a roundabout before crossing over the Red River of the North and into Moorhead, Minnesota, on the Veterans Memorial Bridge.

All of US 10 in North Dakota is part of the National Highway System, a network of highways that are considered essential to the country's economy, defense, and mobility by the Federal Highway Administration.

== History ==
Prior to 1986, US 10 ran along or near I-94, past Valley City, Jamestown, Bismarck, Mandan, Dickinson, and Medora, then west into Montana. When the interstate was built, a lot of towns got bypassed by the freeway. US 10 ran along Main Avenue, Memorial Highway, and Main Street in the Bismarck-Mandan area. The route was decommissioned west of West Fargo in 1986. From Mandan to Dickinson, approximately 90 miles, the old US 10 alignment is now known as the Old Red Trail/Old Ten Scenic Byway, and it passes through towns that the interstate bypassed, including New Salem, Glen Ullin, Hebron, Richardton, and Taylor.

== Major intersections ==
The entire route is in Cass County.

Location	mi	km	Destinations	Notes
West Fargo	0.000	0.000	I-94 / US 52 – Bismarck, Fargo I-94 BL begins	Western terminus of US 10; western end of I-94 Bus. concurrency; I-94 exit 343
Fargo	5.009	8.061	I-29 / US 81 – Sioux Falls, Grand Forks	I-29 exit 65
Fargo	7.025	11.306	US 81 Bus. south (University Drive)	
Fargo	7.221	11.621	To US 81 Bus. north / 9th Street	
Red River of the North	8.043	12.944	Veterans Memorial Bridge; North Dakota–Minnesota line	
Red River of the North	8.043	12.944	I-94 BL east / US 10 east – Moorhead	Continuation into Minnesota
1.000 mi = 1.609 km; 1.000 km = 0.621 mi: Concurrency terminus

U.S. Route 10
Previous state: Terminus	North Dakota	Next state: Minnesota
