= New Liberty Memorial Bridge =

Road bridge in North Dakota, US

- Coordinates: 46°48′29″N 100°49′8″W
- Crosses: Missouri River
- Next upstream: Northern Pacific Railway Bridge
- Next downstream: Bismarck Expressway

History
- Construction start: 2006
- Construction end: 2008
- Inaugurated: November 11, 2008
- Replaces: Liberty Memorial Bridge

Location
- Interactive map of New Liberty Memorial Bridge

The New Liberty Memorial Bridge is a new bridge replacing the Liberty Memorial Bridge in 2008. The bridge connects the two cities of Bismarck and Mandan via car. It crosses the Missouri River downstream from the Grant Marsh Bridge carrying Interstate 94 and the Northern Pacific Railway Bridge. It is upstream from the Expressway Bridge carrying the Bismarck Expressway (Interstate 194).
