= Grant Marsh Bridge =

Bridge in North Dakota, US

- Coordinates: 46°49′23.8″N 100°49′49″W
- Crosses: Missouri River
- Other name: Interstate 94 Bridge
- Named for: Grant Marsh
- Next upstream: Missouri River Bridge
- Next downstream: New Liberty Memorial Bridge

History
- Construction end: 1965
- Inaugurated: 1965

Location
- Interactive map of Grant Marsh Bridge

The Grant Marsh Bridge, or informally as the Interstate 94 Bridge, is a bridge for cars connecting the cities of Bismarck and Mandan, North Dakota, together. The bridge crosses the Missouri River upstream from the Northern Pacific Railway Bridge, New Liberty Memorial Bridge, and the Expressway Bridge. The nearest upstream bridge to the Grant Marsh Bridge is the Missouri River Bridge in Washburn. It is also named after riverboat captain Grant Marsh.

According to a study by the North Dakota Department of Transportation about the bridge, the Grant Marsh Bridge and the surrounding areas have not been improved since its inauguration in 1965.

== History ==
When the Grant Marsh Bridge was finished in 1965, it heavily altered traffic in Bismarck. Before the bridge's construction, all traffic was routed on the Liberty Memorial Bridge to cross the Missouri River. When the Grant Marsh Bridge was finished and opened for drivers, a lot of businesses in downtown Bismarck were impacted from the lack of traffic in the area.
