= North Dakota Highway 41 =

State highway in North Dakota, U.S.

North Dakota Highway 41

Route information
- Maintained by NDDOT
- Length: 86.222 mi (138.761 km)
- Existed: 1926–present

Major junctions
- South end: US 83 north of Wilton
- ND 200 from Mercer to Turtle Lake; US 52 in Velva
- North end: US 2 east of Surrey

Location
- Country: United States
- State: North Dakota
- Counties: McLean, McHenry

Highway system
- North Dakota State Highway System; Interstate; US; State
← ND 40	→ ND 42

North Dakota Highway 41 (ND 41) is an 86.222-mile-long (138.761 km) north–south state highway in the U.S. state of North Dakota. ND 41's southern terminus is at U.S. Route 83 (US 83) north of Wilton, and the northern terminus is at US 2 east of Surrey.

== Major intersections ==
County	Location	mi	km	Destinations	Notes
McLean		0.000	0.000	US 83 – Washburn, Bismarck	Southern terminus
McLean	Mercer	24.995	40.226	ND 200 east – McClusky	Southern end of ND 200 concurrency
McLean		32.995	53.100	ND 200 west – Underwood	Northern end of ND 200 concurrency
McLean		57.098	91.890	ND 53 west – Benedict, Max	Southern end of ND 53 concurrency
McLean		58.101	93.504	ND 53 east – Butte	Northern end of ND 53 concurrency
McHenry		69.126	111.248	ND 23 west – US 83	Eastern terminus of ND 23
McHenry		71.151	114.506	ND 97 east	Western terminus of ND 97
McHenry	Velva	73.417	118.153	US 52 – Harvey, Minot	
McHenry		86.222	138.761	US 2 – Rugby, Surrey, Minot	Northern terminus
1.000 mi = 1.609 km; 1.000 km = 0.621 mi: Concurrency terminus
