= McKenzie Township, North Dakota =

- Township
- Location within North Dakota
- Coordinates: 46°51′06″N 100°23′37″W
- Country: United States
- State: North Dakota
- County: Burleigh

Area
  - Total: 35.92 sq mi (93.04 km^{2})
  - Land: 35.87 sq mi (92.89 km^{2})
  - Water: 0.06 sq mi (0.16 km^{2})
- Elevation: 1,745 ft (532 m)

Population (2020)
  - Total: 114
  - Density: 3.18/sq mi (1.23/km^{2})
- Time zone: UTC-6 (Central (CST))
  - Summer (DST): UTC-5 (CDT)
- Area code: 701
- FIPS code: 38-49380
- GNIS feature ID: 1759339

McKenzie Township is a township in Burleigh County, North Dakota, United States. The population was 114 at the 2020 census.

The unincorporated community of McKenzie lies within McKenzie Township.

== Geography ==
McKenzie Township has a total area of 35.923 square miles (93.04 km^{2}), of which 35.864 square miles (92.89 km^{2}) is land and 0.06 square miles (0.16 km^{2}) is water.

=== Major highways ===
- I-94
- US 83

== Demographics ==
As of the 2023 American Community Survey, there were an estimated 34 households.
