= North Dakota Highway 97 =

State highway in North Dakota, U.S.

North Dakota Highway 97

Route information
- Maintained by NDDOT
- Length: 2.539 mi (4.086 km)

Major junctions
- West end: ND 41 south of Velva
- East end: US 52 west of Voltaire

Location
- Country: United States
- State: North Dakota
- Counties: McHenry

Highway system
- North Dakota State Highway System; Interstate; US; State
← ND 91	→ ND 127

North Dakota Highway 97 (ND 97) is a 2.539-mile-long (4.086 km) east–west state highway in the U.S. state of North Dakota. ND 97's western terminus is at ND 41 south of Velva, and the eastern terminus is at U.S. Route 52 (US 52) west of Voltaire.

== Major intersections ==
The entire route is in McHenry County.

Location	mi	km	Destinations	Notes
	0.000	0.000	ND 41	Western terminus
	2.539	4.086	US 52	Eastern terminus
1.000 mi = 1.609 km; 1.000 km = 0.621 mi
