= Eldred Township, North Dakota =

Township in North Dakota, US

- Township
- Location within North Dakota
- Coordinates: 46°45′36″N 97°29′40″W
- Country: United States
- State: North Dakota
- County: Cass

Area
  - Total: 35.44 sq mi (91.80 km^{2})
  - Land: 35.30 sq mi (91.42 km^{2})
  - Water: 0.15 sq mi (0.38 km^{2})
- Elevation: 1,086 ft (331 m)

Population (2020)
  - Total: 91
  - Density: 2.6/sq mi (1.0/km^{2})
- Time zone: UTC-6 (Central (CST))
  - Summer (DST): UTC-5 (CDT)
- Area code: 701
- FIPS code: 38-22860
- GNIS feature ID: 1036368

Eldred Township is a township in Cass County, North Dakota, United States. The population was 91 at the 2020 census.

The southern portion of the census-designated place of Embden is located in Eldred Township.

== Demographics ==
As of the 2023 American Community Survey, there were an estimated 16 total housing units.
