= Business routes of Interstate 94 =

Interstate 94 Business

Location
- Country: United States

Highway system
- Interstate Highway System; Main; Auxiliary; Suffixed; Business; Future

There are 19 business routes of Interstate 94 (I-94) in the United States. These business routes connect the downtown business districts of cities to the freeway along I-94.

== Montana ==
There are five business routes (two current and three former) in Montana for Hysham, Forsyth, Miles City, Glendive, and Wibaux.

=== Former Hysham business spur ===
Interstate 94 Business
- Location: Hysham

Interstate 94 Business (I-94 Bus.) was a former business spur of I-94 for Hysham that ran along Old US Route 312 (US 312) and Buford Street from exit 67 on I-94 and Secondary Highway 311 (S-311).

=== Former Forsyth business loop ===
Interstate 94 Business
- Location: Forsyth

Interstate 94 Business (I-94 Bus.) was a former business loop of I-94 for Forsyth that ran from exit 93 at US 12, then onto Old US 10 (also known as Front Street) along the north side of I-94, and then onto 18th Avenue to end at exit 95.

=== Miles City business loop ===
Interstate 94 Business
- Location: Miles City

Interstate 94 Business (I-94 Bus.) for Miles City runs from exits 135 and 141 on I-94. It consists of Main Street, Valley Drive East, and a former segment of US 12.

I-94 Bus. in Miles City begins at a trumpet interchange with I-94 and heads northeast where it passes by the Miles City State Fish Hatchery. The road continues in the same direction as it climbs a bridge over a former Northern Pacific Railway (NP) line, until it turns more to the east, running between the Range Riders Museum and the Miles City Fairground. The route does not officially enter the city limits until it crosses a bridge over the Tongue River, and even then cuts between Riverside Park before running through the Main Street Historic District, which begins at Fourth Street and includes an intersection with Seventh Avenue where it encounters Montana Highway 59 (MT 59), and that route joins it in a concurrency. The historic district ends just before the bridge under the same NP line, and then turns left onto Valley Drive East, while MT 59 continues east along Main Street.

Along this segment, I-94 Bus. flanks the east side of that former NP line and serves as the terminus of numerous local streets, except for Leighton Boulevard. North of the intersection of Haynes Avenue, I-94 Bus. turns right onto a former segment of US 12, while Valley Road East continues to the northeast flanking that former NP line. From there, the road passes by a truck weigh station next to a self-storage facility but continues to run relatively east mostly through local farmland. After passing by a local RV park, I-94 Bus. ends at a diamond interchange with I-94, and the road continues onto US 12 toward Baker and through the North Dakota state line.

=== Glendive business loop ===
Interstate 94 Business
- Location: Glendive

Interstate 94 Business (I-94 Bus.) for Glendive runs between exits 210 and 215 on I-94. It includes West Towne Street and North Merrill Avenue, both of which are former segments of US 10.

I-94 Bus. begins at an unorthodox trumpet interchange known as exit 210 south of West Glendive and branches off to an upper right angle along West Towne Street. North of the interchange, the route is mostly a four-lane undivided highway with a center-left turn lane, except at the bridge over the Upper Seven Mile Creek, where it briefly becomes a four-lane divided highway. From there, it passes by a pair of agriculture-related factories. Though signs on I-94 direct motorists to MT 200S, the road does not encounter that route until Alder Avenue in West Glendive, north of a parallel railroad crossing. Dividing again at another bridge over Dry Creek, the route begins to curve to the east, and the road starts to run along the north side of some parkland, which also borders a former section of the road named Crisafulli Drive just before approaching the southern terminus of MT 16 and immediately crosses a railroad line on the border of West Glendive and Glendive.

The road narrows down from four lanes with a center left-turn lane to two lanes before crossing the bridge over the Yellowstone River and, at the intersection of River Avenue and Douglas Street, enters the Merrill Avenue Historic District. West Towne Street ends at Merrill Avenue where South Merrill Avenue is marked as S-335, while I-94 Bus./MT 200S makes a sharp north turn onto North Merrill Avenue. Two blocks later at Clement Street, the historic district fades away within the vicinity of a former NP station now owned by BNSF Railway. Some BNSF related buildings can be found north of there before the route passes by the chamber of commerce along the tracks, and later across from that, the grounds of Dawson County High School. North of that point, the surroundings become slightly more rural. I-94 Bus. and MT 200S end at the diamond interchange with I-94 known as exit 215, while North Merrill Avenue continues as a local street, with an immediate intersection of a road leading to the Glendive Dinosaur and Fossil Museum and Frontier Gateway Museum.

=== Former Wibaux business loop ===
Interstate 94 Business
- Location: Wibaux

Interstate 94 Business (I-94 Bus.) was a former business loop of I-94 for Wibaux that ran from exit 241 on I-94 at S-261. The interchange is a half diamond interchange with an eastbound only offramp and westbound only onramp. South of there, the route then turned onto Old US 10 (Second Avenue) in the middle of the city, and then onto MT 7 which joins the former route from North Wibaux Street as they cross a bridge over the Beaver Creek. A rest area for I-94 can be found on the southwest corner of Second Avenue and Log Cabin Road, which is only accessible from Second Avenue. The former I-94 Bus. and MT 7 make a left turn onto Log Cabin Road and both routes end at exit 242 on I-94, which is another half diamond interchange that, in this case, has only a westbound offramp and eastbound onramp. Due to the fact that the rest area extends as far north as the embankment on the southwest corner of the bridge, it obstructs any potential conversion into a full interchange if the Montana Department of Transportation were to decide to make such a conversion.

== North Dakota and Minnesota ==
There are five business routes (one former) wholly in North Dakota with a sixth that crosses into Minnesota. They connect to Medora, Dickinson, Mandan–Bismarck, Jamestown (former), Valley City in North Dakota and the cities of West Fargo, Fargo and Moorhead, Minnesota.

=== Medora business loop ===
Interstate 94 Business
- Location: Medora, North Dakota
- Length: 3.448 mi (5.549 km)

Interstate 94 Business (I-94 Bus.) for Medora, North Dakota, runs from exits 24 to 27 on I-94 within Theodore Roosevelt National Park's South Unit. Named "Pacific Avenue", I-94 Bus. is the main road through Medora.

I-94 Bus. begins at a quarter cloverleaf interchange with I-94 on the southwest banks of the Little Missouri River. After crossing a bridge over a tributary of that river named Andrew's Creek, it runs southeast as it follows the northeastern edge of a former NP line. Simultaneously, the "Maah Daah Hey Trail" runs along the opposite side of the road. After the entrance to the Medora Camp Grounds, and the Chateau De Mores Visitor Center, I-94 Bus. crosses its own bridge over the Little Missouri River and enters "downtown" Medora. Various Western-themed structures and tourist attractions can be found within the community. East of 6th Street, I-94 Bus./Pacific Avenue begins to curve away from the railroad line toward the northeast. I-94 Bus. ends at a flyover ramp on I-94 (exit 27), but only for eastbound traffic reentering the Interstate and westbound traffic leaving the Interstate.

=== Dickinson business loop ===
Interstate 94 Business
- Location: Dickinson, North Dakota
- Length: 5.162 mi (8.307 km)

Interstate 94 Business (I-94 Bus.) for Dickinson, North Dakota, runs from exits 59 to 64 on I-94. It consists of 30th Avenue West, Villard Street, and 36th Street Southwest.

I-94 Bus. begins at a diamond interchange with 30th Avenue West (I-94 exit 59) and runs south-southeast then passes by housing developments built only within the 2010s as it curves toward the east approaching Villard Street (Old US 10, now Stark County Road 10 [CR 10]). Almost immediately after the route moves onto Villard Street, it approaches a signalized intersection with State Avenue, which is North Dakota Highway 22 Truck (ND 22 Truck) south. I-94 Bus. soon reaches the next signalized intersection, ND 22 (3rd Avenue West) itself. At the next signalized intersection with 10th Avenue East, I-94 Bus. leaves Villard Street and shifts onto 36th Street Southwest, which is signed as "I-94 Business" along street name signs. This segment runs northeast mainly passing car, truck, RV, farm equipment, and trailer dealerships and other local industries. I-94 Bus. ends at another diamond interchange, specifically exit 64 on I-94, but 36th Street Southwest (old US 10) continues to run along the far north side of I-94.

=== Mandan–Bismarck business loop ===
Interstate 94 Business
- Location: Mandan–Bismarck, North Dakota
- Length: 17.4 mi (28.0 km)

Interstate 94 Business (I-94 Bus.) for both Mandan and Bismarck, North Dakota, runs from exit 147 west of Mandan to exit 161 in Bismarck.

The route begins at exit 147, a diamond interchange with ND 25 in Mandan and runs south from that interchange to an intersection with Morton CR 139 (formerly US 10), where it turns southeast. Continuing over the hills of North Dakota, it approaches the north side of a former NP line now owned by BNSF Railway, and both the road and railway cross bridges over the Heart River, as the eventually enter the unincorporated community of Sunny. The route crosses a second bridge over the Heart River, where it officially enters Mandan and becomes West Main Street. The first signalized intersection in the city is with the northern terminus of ND 6 at the intersection with 10th Avenue Northwest. West Main Street becomes East Main Street at Collins Avenue. Starting at 6th Avenue Southeast, it has a concurrency with ND 1806 and is also replaced by an overlap with the Lewis and Clark National Historic Trail. At Mandan Avenue, ND 1806 and the Lewis and Clark National Historic Trail turns north, and East Main Street heads to exit 155 on I-94, but I-94 Bus. turns southeast again onto Memorial Highway, crossing under and then running along the south side of that same former NP line. The line curves east away from the road just before the intersection with 32nd Avenue Southeast across from that, then I-94 Bus. curves to the east as it approaches an unorthodox interchange with I-194 (Bismarck Expressway) before it crosses the new Liberty Memorial Bridge over the Missouri River to enter Bismarck.

On the east side of this bridge, Memorial Highway turns south across from the intersection with Frannie Barracks Road, and I-94 Bus. smoothly moves onto West Main Avenue. After a pedestrian bridge, the route encounter a bridge for the same former NP line just before an at-grade interchange with West Rosser Avenue and turns southeast as it runs along the north side of those tracks once again. The road and the tracks turn east again at Washington Street. At North 1st Street, West 1st Avenue becomes East 1st Avenue across from Camp Hancock State Historic Site Further in town, the road continues not only to run along that old NP line but even the beginning of a former Soo Line Railroad (SOO) line, now owned by Canadian Pacific Railway. That line has a spur leading to a grade crossing between East 24th and 26th streets. At 7th Street, it meets southbound ND 1804 (one way). At 9th Street, it meets northbound ND 1804 (one way). The road curves slightly to the southeast then the northeast as it encounters another SOO spur west of Eastdale Avenue. The northeastward curve of the road almost ends just before I-94 Bus. turns north onto the "East Bismarck Expressway". I-94 Bus. ends at exit 161, another diamond interchange on I-94/US 83, then turns into a local street named Centennial Road.

=== Former Jamestown business loop ===
Interstate 94 Business
- Location: Jamestown, North Dakota
- Existed: April 7, 2004

Interstate 94 Business (I-94 Bus.) was a former business loop of I-94 that existed within Jamestown between exits 257 and 260. It consisted of 17th Street Southwest, US 281, US 52, 10th Street Southeast, 12th Avenue Southeast, and Business Loop East until it was decommissioned on April 7, 2004.

=== Valley City business loop ===
Interstate 94 Business
- Location: Valley City, North Dakota
- Length: 4.383 mi (7.054 km)

Interstate 94 Business (I-94 Bus.) for Valley City runs from exits 290 to 294 on I-94/US 52. It is also concurrent with US 10 Bus. and US 52 Bus. The route begins at exit 290, a half diamond/quarter cloverleaf interchange. More specifically, its the eastbound lanes have half the diamond interchange onto CR 19 (24th Avenue Southwest), while the westbound lanes contain an elongated right-in/right-out ramps onto Main Street west of the bridge over CR 19. The two segments of I-94 Bus. intersect with one another and run eastbound along Main Street, which contains a flanking frontage road along the south side. It curves to the northeast almost immediately after the intersection with CR 18 and the frontage road becomes a dead end just south of 4th Street West. From 9th Avenue West to 7th Avenue West, Main Street curves back to straight east again, but, in between at 8th Avenue, the routes are joined by another overlap, specifically with CR 21. East of 5th Avenue West, I-94 Bus./US 10 Bus./US 52 Bus./CR 21 curves around the edge of the Sheyenne River, just south of the former NP station (now the "Rosebud Visitors Center"), then resumes its previous trajectory.

The overlap with CR 21 ends at Central Avenue, where that route turns north, and downtown Valley City begins to fade away at the intersection with 6th Avenue Northeast, where it passes a trailer park just before encountering the Sheyenne River again at the Rainbow Arch Bridge. East of the bridge, the surroundings are less urban, but not entirely undeveloped, until the road curves to the southeast. Just after the intersection with 7th Street Southeast and "Old US 10", I-94 Bus./US 10 Bus./US 52 Bus. ends at exit 294, a diamond interchange that replaced a former Y interchange located east of the former NP and SOO bridges on I-94 east of the current interchange.

=== West Fargo-Fargo–Moorhead business loop ===
Interstate 94 Business
- Location: West Fargo, North Dakota-Fargo, North Dakota–Moorhead, Minnesota

Interstate 94 Business (I-94 Bus.) for West Fargo, North Dakota, Fargo, North Dakota, and Moorhead, Minnesota, is the only I-94 business route that runs between two states. It begins at exit 343 on I-94/US 52 in Mapleton Township, and runs on Main Avenue through West Fargo and Fargo. Upon crossing the Red River of the North into Moorhead, Minnesota, I-94 Bus. continues on Main Avenue until reaching 24th Avenue South, at which point it turns east over to 34th Street South. The route then turns south and ends at exit 2B on I-94/US 52 in Moorhead, Minnesota. The route is concurrent with US 10 in both states, but, in Moorhead, US 10 makes a left turn at US 75 for one block north.

== Michigan ==
There are eight business routes in Michigan. They connect Benton Harbor–St. Joseph, Kalamazoo, Battle Creek, Marshall, Albion, Jackson, Ann Arbor and Port Huron to the freeway mainline.
