= McKenzie, North Dakota =

- Unincorporated community
- Location within North Dakota Location within the United States
- Coordinates: 46°49′27″N 100°24′48″W
- Country: United States
- State: North Dakota
- County: Burleigh
- Township: McKenzie

Area
  - Total: 35.9 sq mi (93.1 km^{2})
  - Land: 35.9 sq mi (93.0 km^{2})
  - Water: 0.077 sq mi (0.2 km^{2})
- Elevation: 1,706 ft (520 m)

Population (2000)
  - Total: 83
  - Density: 2.3/sq mi (0.89/km^{2})
- Time zone: UTC-6 (Central (CST))
  - Summer (DST): UTC-5 (CDT)
- ZIP code: 58572 (Sterling)
- Area code: 701
- FIPS code: 38-49380
- GNIS feature ID: 1030151

McKenzie is an unincorporated community in McKenzie Township, Burleigh County, North Dakota, United States. It lies approximately 20 miles east of Bismarck along I-94/US 83.

A post office called McKenzie was established in 1887, and remained in operation until 1965. The community was named after early North Dakota politician Alexander McKenzie.
