= Hill Township, North Dakota =

Township in North Dakota, US

- Township
- Location within North Dakota
- Coordinates: 46°50′50″N 97°37′04″W
- Country: United States
- State: North Dakota
- County: Cass

Area
  - Total: 35.86 sq mi (92.87 km^{2})
  - Land: 35.86 sq mi (92.87 km^{2})
  - Water: 0 sq mi (0.00 km^{2})
- Elevation: 1,135 ft (346 m)

Population (2020)
  - Total: 44
  - Density: 1.2/sq mi (0.47/km^{2})
- Time zone: UTC-6 (Central (CST))
  - Summer (DST): UTC-5 (CDT)
- Area code: 701
- FIPS code: 38-38060
- GNIS feature ID: 1036371

Hill Township is a township in Cass County, North Dakota, United States. The population was 44 at the 2020 census.

== Geography ==
Hill Township has a total area of 35.859 square miles (92.87 km^{2}), all land.

== Demographics ==
As of the 2023 American Community Survey, there were an estimated 27 households.
