= Enchanted Highway =

Tourist attraction in North Dakota

Route of the Enchanted Highway

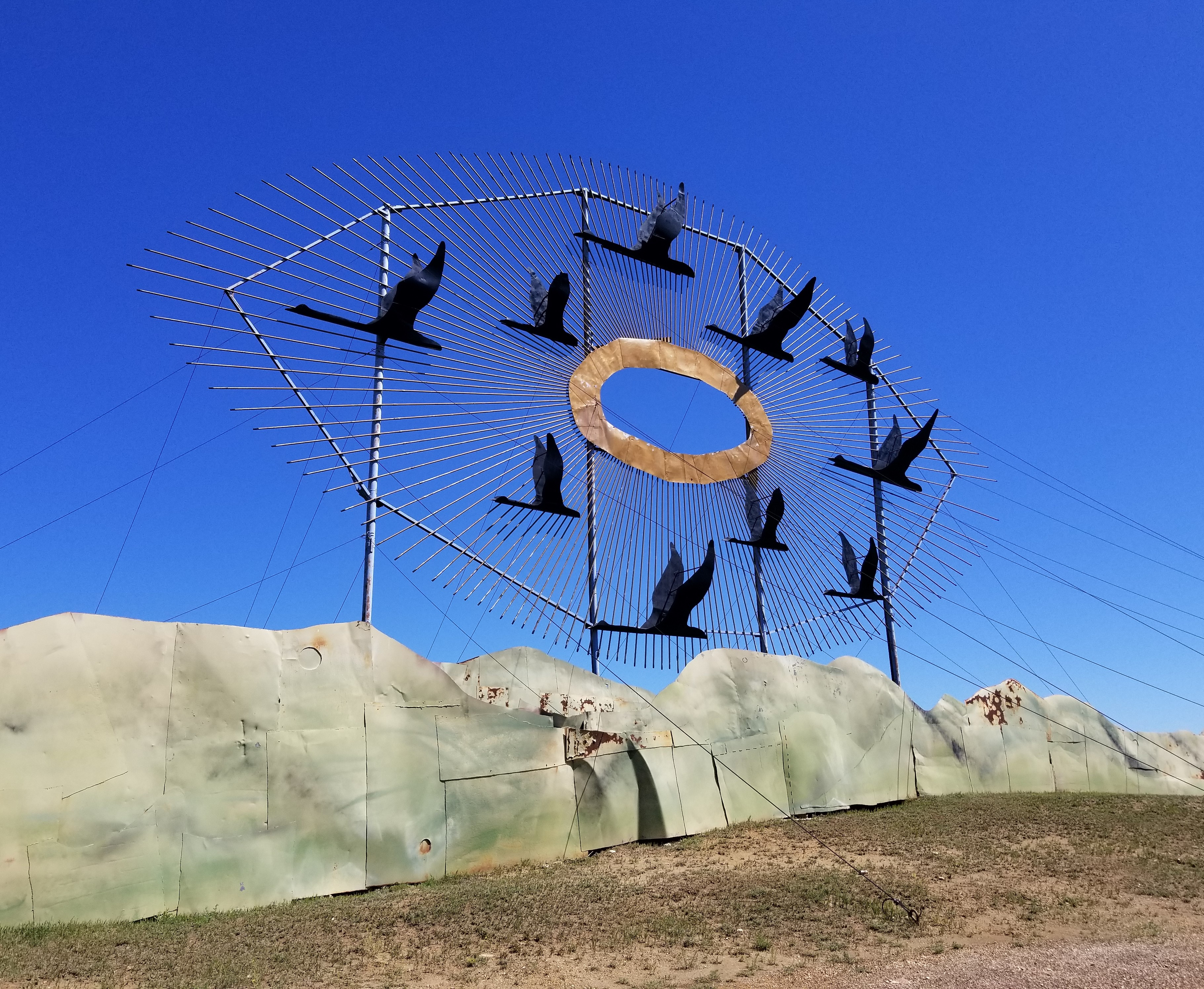
Geese in Flight sculpture

The Enchanted Highway is a route adorned with scrap metal sculptures constructed by Gary Greff at intervals along a 32-mile (51 km) stretch of a two-lane highway in southwestern North Dakota. It is the world's largest collection of scrap metal sculptures.

== Description ==
The Enchanted Highway extends north from Regent to the Gladstone exit on Interstate 94 east of Dickinson. The road has no highway number, although its northern portion is 100 M Avenue SW (counting from Bismarck, which is 85 miles [137 km] to the east). Each sculpture has a developed pull-out and several have picnic shelters; the highway passes through scenic farm country with intermittent buttes. Geese in Flight is visible from I-94, standing 110 feet tall and 150 feet wide. In 2002, it was recognized as the world's largest scrap metal sculpture by the Guinness Book of World Records.

== History ==
Local artist Gary Greff conceived of the project and began building it in 1989, and continues to maintain the sculptures. He took inspiration from local wildlife and historical figures, including Theodore Roosevelt. Greff's intention was to revive his hometown of Regent, after decades of population and economic decline. In 2012, Greff opened a motel, The Enchanted Castle, in Regent, continuing the theme of the Enchanted Highway. The State of North Dakota provided $75,000 in its 2019-2020 budget to assist Greff in maintaining the sculptures; prior to that year, he had used his own money and donations to pay for upkeep. The highway attracts approximately 6,000 tourist cars per year.

== Sculptures ==
- The Tin Family (1991)
- Teddy Roosevelt Rides Again (1993)
- Pheasants on the Prairie (1996)
- Grasshoppers in the Field (1999)
- Geese in Flight (2001)
- Deer Crossing (2002)
- Fisherman's Dream (2006)
- Wirly Gigs (Unknown)
- Sir Albert and the Dragon (In progress)
- Spider Webs (In progress)

== Gallery ==
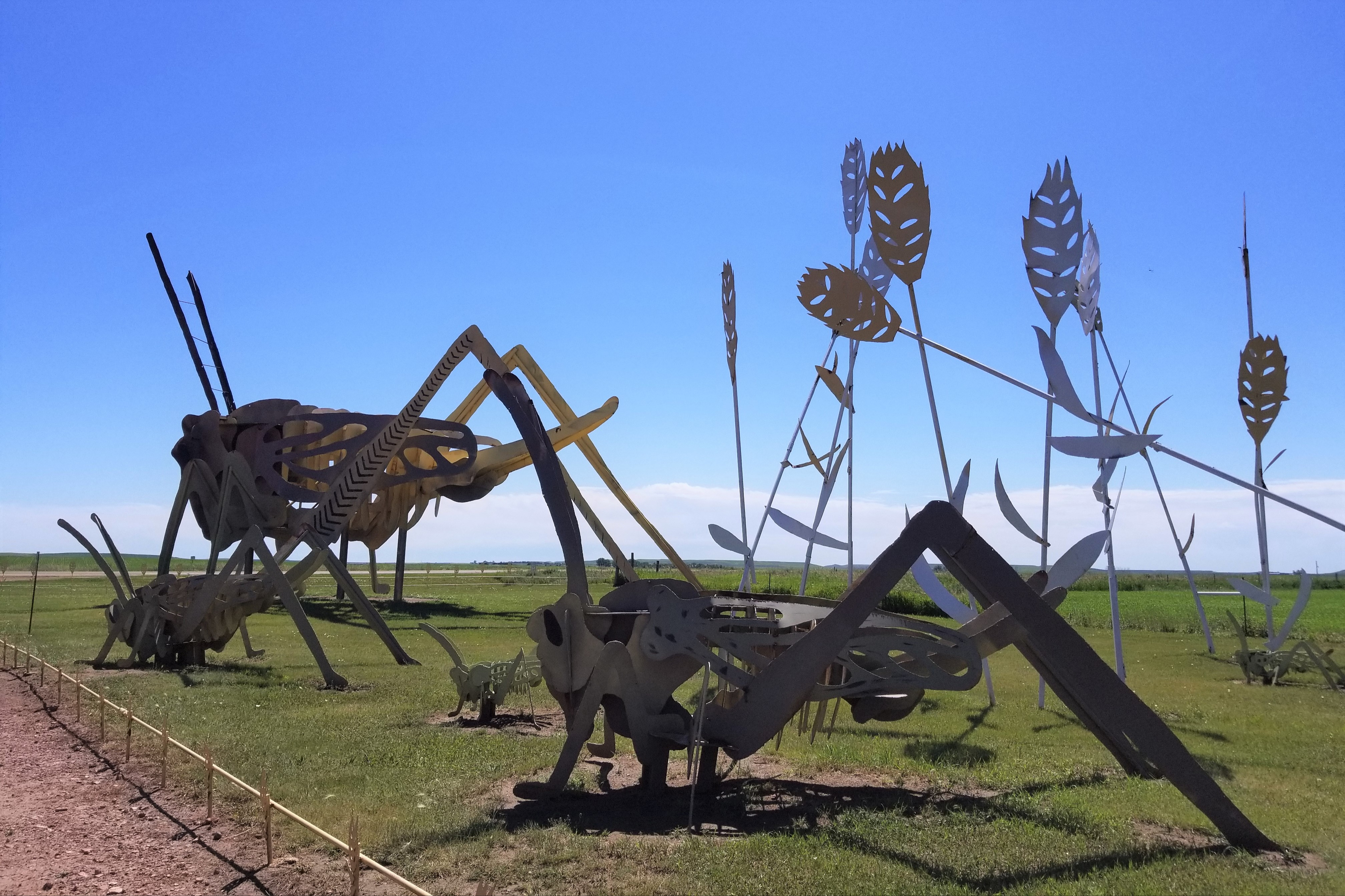
Grasshoppers in the Field

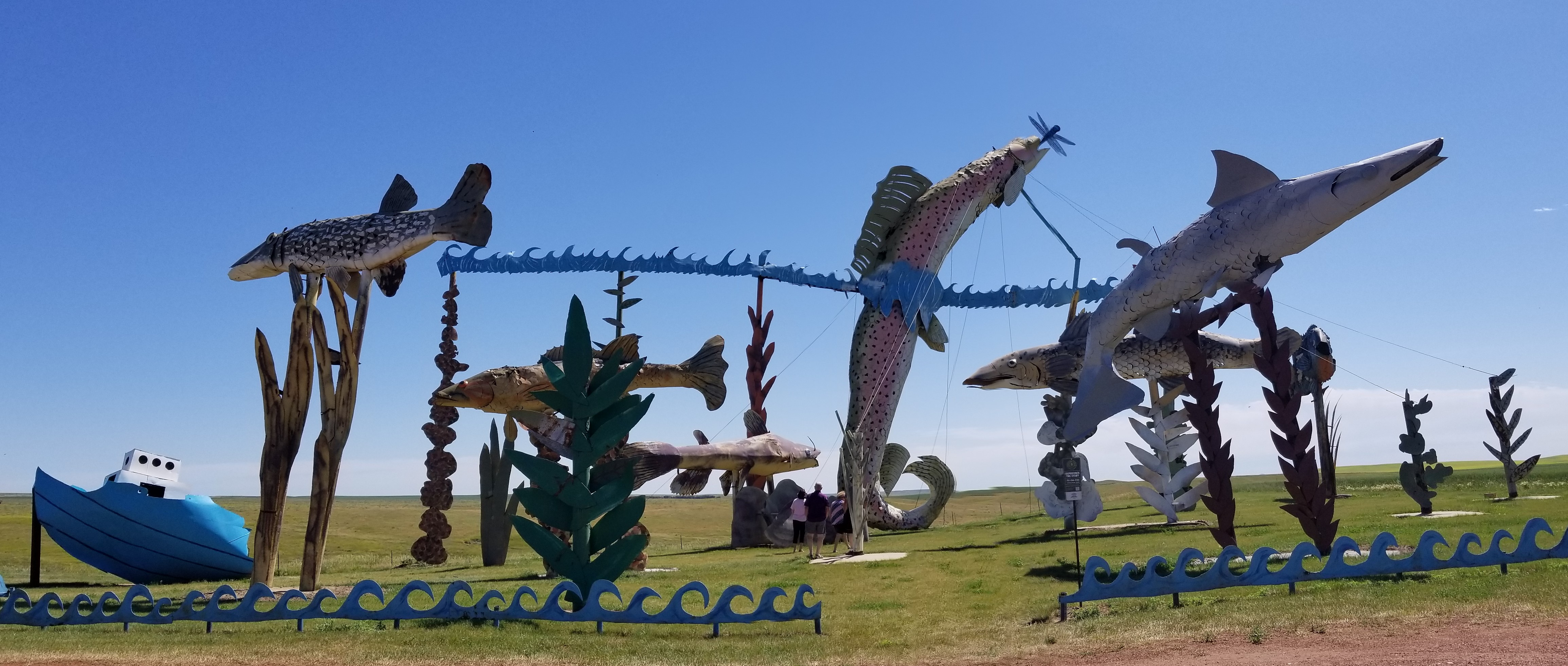
Fisherman's Dream

Pheasants on the Prairie

The Tin Family
