= Howes Township, North Dakota =

Township in North Dakota, US

- Township
- Location within North Dakota
- Coordinates: 46°50′49″N 97°29′35″W
- Country: United States
- State: North Dakota
- County: Cass

Area
  - Total: 35.82 sq mi (92.78 km^{2})
  - Land: 35.70 sq mi (92.46 km^{2})
  - Water: 0.12 sq mi (0.31 km^{2})
- Elevation: 1,120 ft (340 m)

Population (2020)
  - Total: 86
  - Density: 2.4/sq mi (0.93/km^{2})
- Time zone: UTC-6 (Central (CST))
  - Summer (DST): UTC-5 (CDT)
- Area code: 701
- FIPS code: 38-39140
- GNIS feature ID: 1036369

Howes Township is a township in Cass County, North Dakota, United States. The population was 86 at the 2020 census.

The northern portion of the census-designated place of Embden is located in Howes Township.

== Geography ==
Howes Township has a total area of 35.821 square miles (92.78 km^{2}), of which 35.700 square miles (92.46 km^{2}) is land and 0.121 square miles (0.31 km^{2}) is water.

== Demographics ==
As of the 2023 American Community Survey, there were an estimated 25 households.
