= Tappen, North Dakota =

- City
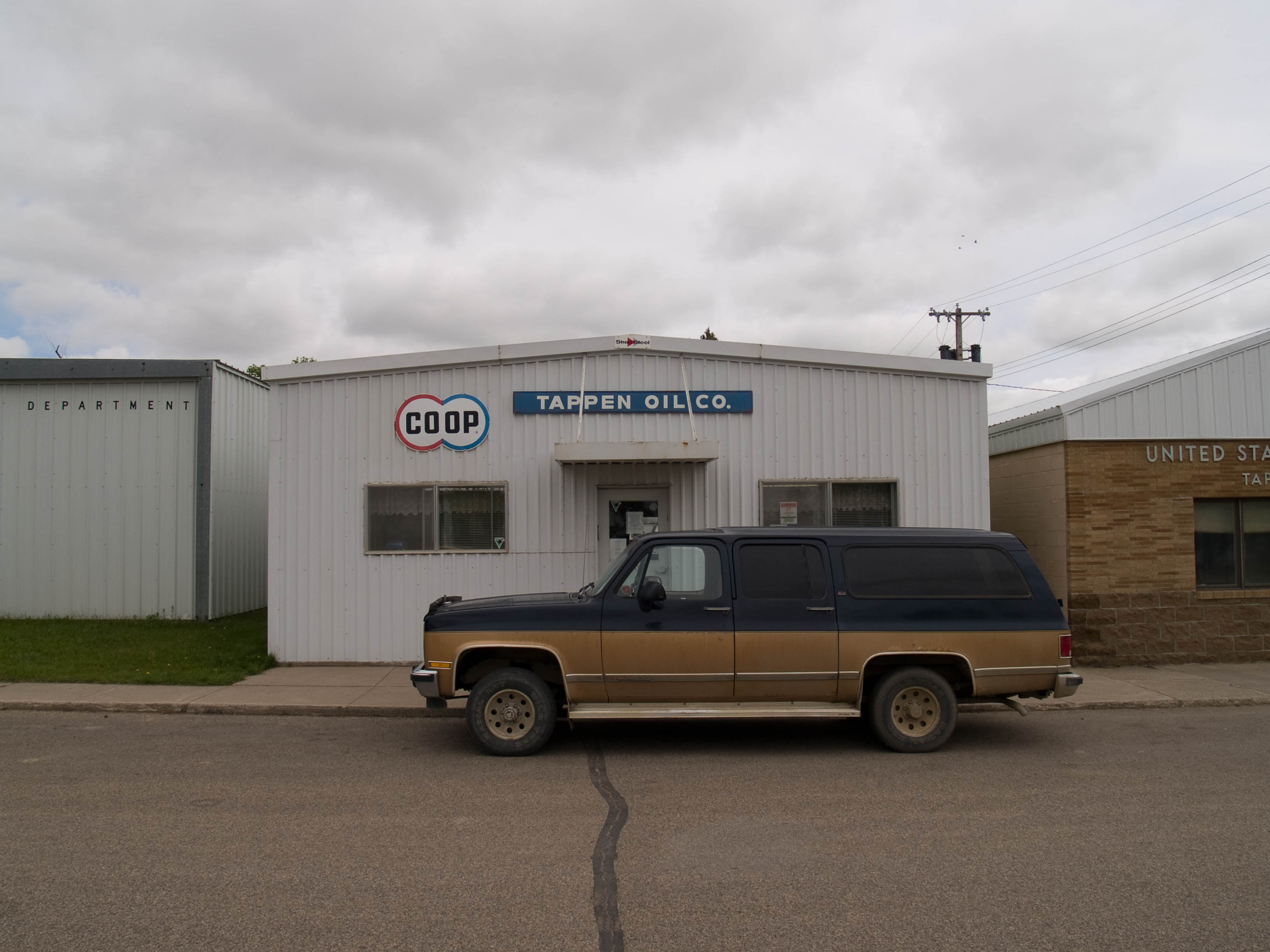
- Tappen Oil Company - Tappen

- Location of Tappen, North Dakota
- Coordinates: 46°52′33″N 99°37′55″W
- Country: United States
- State: North Dakota
- County: Kidder
- Founded: 1882

Area
  - Total: 1.05 sq mi (2.72 km^{2})
  - Land: 1.05 sq mi (2.72 km^{2})
  - Water: 0 sq mi (0.00 km^{2})
- Elevation: 1,770 ft (540 m)

Population (2020)
  - Total: 217
  - Estimate (2022): 216
  - Density: 206.9/sq mi (79.89/km^{2})
- Time zone: UTC-6 (Central (CST))
  - Summer (DST): UTC-5 (CDT)
- ZIP code: 58487
- Area code: 701
- FIPS code: 38-77980
- GNIS feature ID: 1036292

Tappen is a city in Kidder County, North Dakota, United States. The population was 217 at the 2020 census.

== History ==
Tappen was founded in 1882. The city was named for Sheppard Tappen, a local landowner. A post office has been in operation at Tappen since 1882.

== Geography ==
According to the United States Census Bureau, the city has a total area of 1.05 square miles (2.72 km^{2}), all land.

== Demographics ==
Historical population
Census	Pop.	Note	%±
1920	182		—
1930	208		14.3%
1940	323		55.3%
1950	379		17.3%
1960	326		−14.0%
1970	294		−9.8%
1980	271		−7.8%
1990	239		−11.8%
2000	210		−12.1%
2010	197		−6.2%
2020	217		10.2%
2022 (est.)	216		−0.5%
U.S. Decennial Census; 2020 Census

=== 2010 census ===
As of the census of 2010, there were 197 people, 89 households, and 52 families residing in the city. The population density was 187.6 inhabitants per square mile (72.4/km^{2}). There were 106 housing units at an average density of 101.0 per square mile (39.0/km^{2}). The racial makeup of the city was 97.0% White, 0.5% African American, 1.5% from other races, and 1.0% from two or more races. Hispanic or Latino of any race were 2.5% of the population.

There were 89 households, of which 28.1% had children under the age of 18 living with them, 42.7% were married couples living together, 5.6% had a female householder with no husband present, 10.1% had a male householder with no wife present, and 41.6% were non-families. 34.8% of all households were made up of individuals, and 8.9% had someone living alone who was 65 years of age or older. The average household size was 2.21 and the average family size was 2.81.

The median age in the city was 40.3 years. 23.4% of residents were under the age of 18; 9.1% were between the ages of 18 and 24; 25.4% were from 25 to 44; 27.4% were from 45 to 64; and 14.7% were 65 years of age or older. The gender makeup of the city was 52.8% male and 47.2% female.

=== 2000 census ===
As of the census of 2000, there were 210 people, 88 households, and 54 families residing in the city. The population density was 167.7 inhabitants per square mile (64.7/km^{2}). There were 100 housing units at an average density of 79.9 per square mile (30.8/km^{2}). The racial makeup of the city was 99.52% White and 0.48% African American. Hispanic or Latino of any race were 0.48% of the population.

There were 88 households, out of which 29.5% had children under the age of 18 living with them, 52.3% were married couples living together, 6.8% had a female householder with no husband present, and 38.6% were non-families. 35.2% of all households were made up of individuals, and 13.6% had someone living alone who was 65 years of age or older. The average household size was 2.39 and the average family size was 3.15.

In the city, the population was spread out, with 29.5% under the age of 18, 6.2% from 18 to 24, 24.8% from 25 to 44, 23.8% from 45 to 64, and 15.7% who were 65 years of age or older. The median age was 38 years. For every 100 females, there were 107.9 males. For every 100 females age 18 and over, there were 114.5 males.

The median income for a household in the city was $31,625, and the median income for a family was $34,444. Males had a median income of $30,250 versus $15,000 for females. The per capita income for the city was $14,453. About 5.2% of families and 10.1% of the population were below the poverty line, including 6.8% of those under the age of eighteen and 11.4% of those 65 or over.

== Climate ==
This climatic region is typified by large seasonal temperature differences, with warm to hot (and often humid) summers and cold (sometimes severely cold) winters. According to the Köppen Climate Classification system, Tappen has a humid continental climate, abbreviated "Dfb" on climate maps.
