= Dakota Zoo =

Zoo in Bismarck, North Dakota, United States

- Interactive map of Dakota Zoo
- 46.7995°N 100.8068°W
- Date opened: 3 June 1961
- Location: Bismarck, North Dakota, United States
- Land area: 90 acres (36 ha)
- No. of animals: 600+
- No. of species: 125
- Annual visitors: 150,000
- Memberships: AZA
- Public transit: Bis-Man Transit
- Website: www.dakotazoo.org

The Dakota Zoo is a zoo in Bismarck, North Dakota located on the banks of the Missouri River. It is the third zoo built in North Dakota. The Dakota Zoo is accredited by the Association of Zoos and Aquariums (AZA).

== History ==
The Dakota Zoo began on a 67-acre (27 ha) farm owned by Marc and Betty Christianson on the northern edge of Bismarck. At first, the farm boarded domestic animals such as dogs, cats, and horses. At one point, the farm was used to raise mink for profit. Over time, people who knew of the Christiansons' love for animals began dropping off strays and injured animals, knowing that they would be well taken care of. As the number of animals increased, word got out and more and more people came to see them.

After some publicity from a local TV station, petitions were signed by 780 people supporting the idea of a community zoo in Bismarck. Marc Christianson took these to the Bismarck Park Board to present the concept of a self-supporting community zoo. In 1958, the Park Board made 88 acres (36 ha) of Park District land in Sertoma Park available to the zoo.

The majority of construction was initially done by Marc and his crew with donated materials. The zoo opened on June 3, 1961, with 75 mammals, 23 birds, and about 15 acres (61,000 m^{2}) of developed land. In the first year, 40,000 people paid ten cents each to visit the zoo. By 2007, there were about 3,400 zoo members, and more than 100,000 visitors per year to view 125 species of animals and birds. By 2020, the zoo had grown to over 90 acres in size and averaged over 150,000 annual visitors.

The Dakota Zoo has been accredited by the Association of Zoos and Aquariums (AZA) since 1991. It is unlike many nationwide zoos in that it is self-supportive and operates solely on funds raised through admissions, concession sales, adopt an animal programs, memberships, and donations. The zoo is supported by its visitors and community sponsors and is not tax supported.

== Animals ==
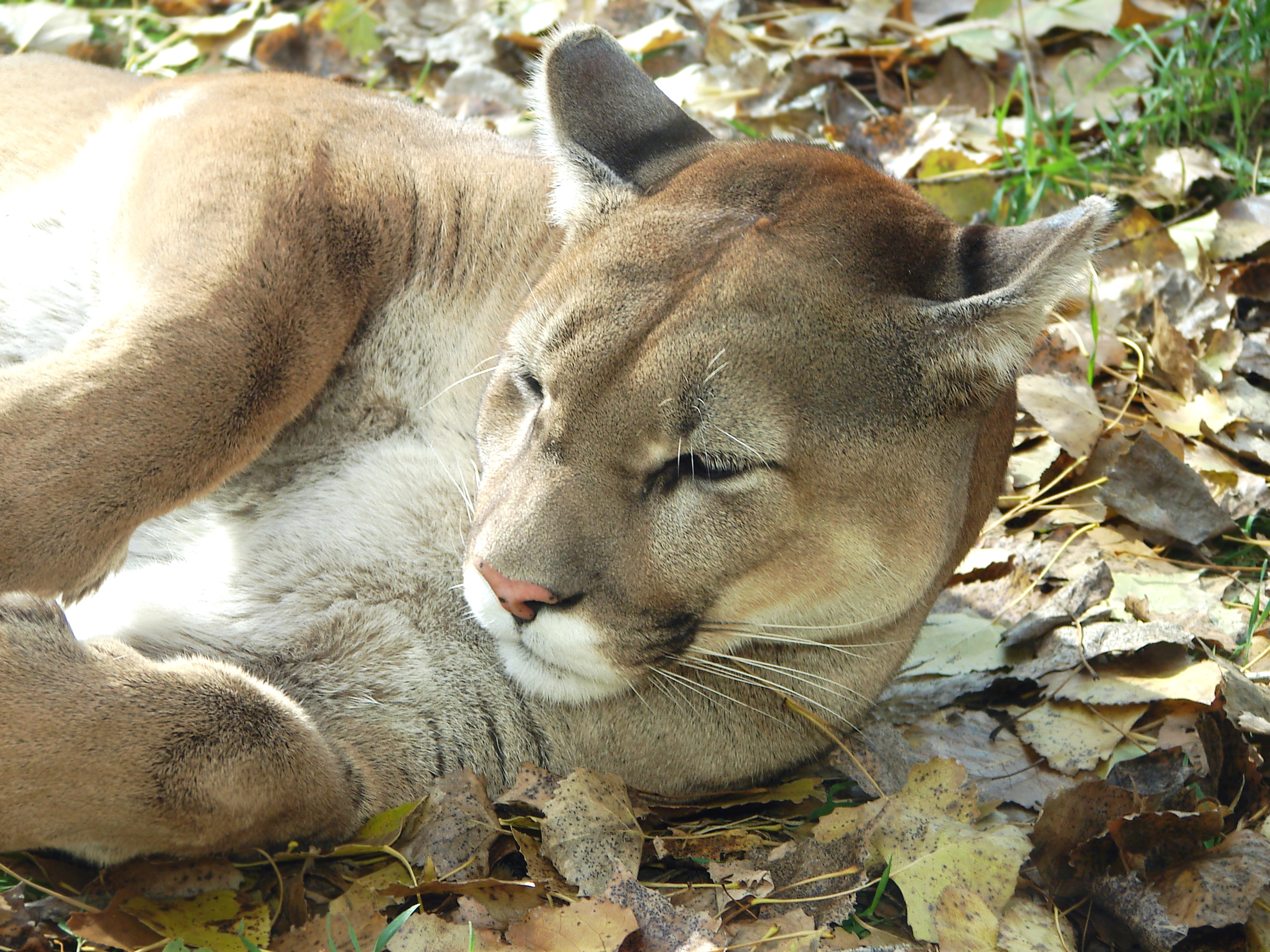
A cougar at the Dakota Zoo

Ungulates are mostly housed in the southern part of the zoo in large, open enclosures. Animals in this area include goats, pigs, miniature horses, miniature donkeys, Highland cattle, bison, pronghorn, Przewalski's horse, Bactrian camel, Dall sheep, bighorn sheep, mountain goats, moose, reindeer, longhorn cattle, Clydesdale horses, and elk. Llama, mouflon, and aoudad are in the northeast section of the zoo.

Predators are housed in the northern part of the zoo, and include tigers, snow leopards, wolves, bears, Canada lynx, bobcats, cougars, coyotes, foxes, badgers, and servals.

Birds are housed in a variety of smaller enclosures and aviaries, mostly in the center of the zoo, and include eagles, emus, many South American birds, turkey vultures, wild turkeys, owls, penguins, and various water birds.

Monkeys are mostly housed in the Primate Center near the center of the zoo and include cotton-top tamarins, Goeldi’s monkey, golden-headed lion tamarin, pygmy marmoset, red ruffed lemurs, white-fronted marmosets, and spider monkeys.

The zoo also includes an exhibit of reptiles and small mammals, a butterfly house, a prairie dog town, and a monkey barn.

== Facilities ==
The Bismarck Tribune Discovery Center is inside the zoo from the entrance gate, and contains reptiles, small mammals, fish, a honeybee colony, and educational areas for children. The zoo also features a gift shop, concession stand, ice cream parlor, two playgrounds, and a petting zoo. Two trains are used to provide tours of the zoo.

== Conservation ==
The zoo participates in the AZA Species Survival Plan (SSP).

In 2013, the Dakota Zoo created a Conservation Fund, with 50¢ from each admission and $5 from each membership being added to the fund. The Fund has contributed over $250,000 to various conservation efforts, including 16 Species Survival Plans, 9 Population Management Plans, and the AZA Conservation Grants Fund.

The Zoo operates a Raptor Rehabilitation program, assisting an average of 40 to 60 injured and orphaned birds of prey each year.

== Clyde the Bear ==
The Dakota Zoo was home to Clyde, the largest captive Kodiak brown bear ever recorded. Clyde was believed to have been born in January 1965. The Federal government originally studied Clyde as a research animal to determine the effect of the radioactive isotope Strontium-90 on wildlife. He was 180 pounds (81 kilograms), still a cub, when brought to Bismarck later that year. He grew to weigh in excess of 2,130 pounds (960 kilograms), stood over 9 feet tall (2.7 meters), and lived until 1987.

The Bismarck Tribune Discovery Center features a 1:1 scale wood carving of Clyde, created by artist Dave Ely.

== The future ==
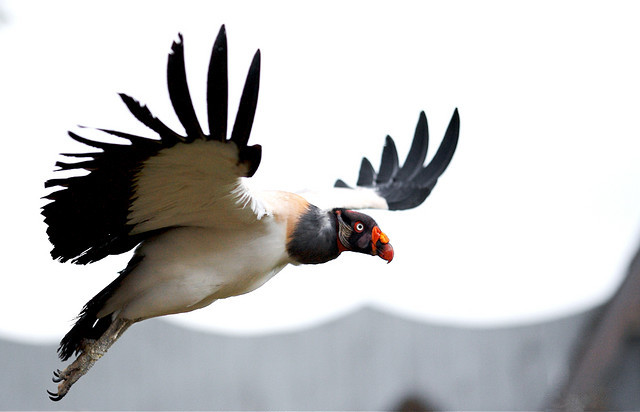
King vulture (Sarcoramphus papa) in flight.

In 1987, the Bismarck Tribune challenged the zoo to develop a master plan to outline the future course of the zoo. The zoo board developed a plan which is reviewed and updated regularly, with the last review having been in 2005. There have been three major capital campaigns since the master plan was initiated, to raise money for the zoo.

The "Beyond the Bear Necessities" capital campaign started in 1988 and raised money for exhibits such as the bear habitat, river otter exhibit, canine, and small animal exhibits. The second campaign, called "Discovery 2000 - Turning Dollars Into Senses," raised $1.5 million for exhibits including moose, mountain goat, mountain lion, bobcat, lynx and the Discovery Zoo. in 2002, "Make the Big Cats Roar" was launched to raise $1.9 million. This goal was reached in late 2005, and an extended goal of $2.3 million was added.
