= Embden, North Dakota =

- Census-designated place & Unincorporated community
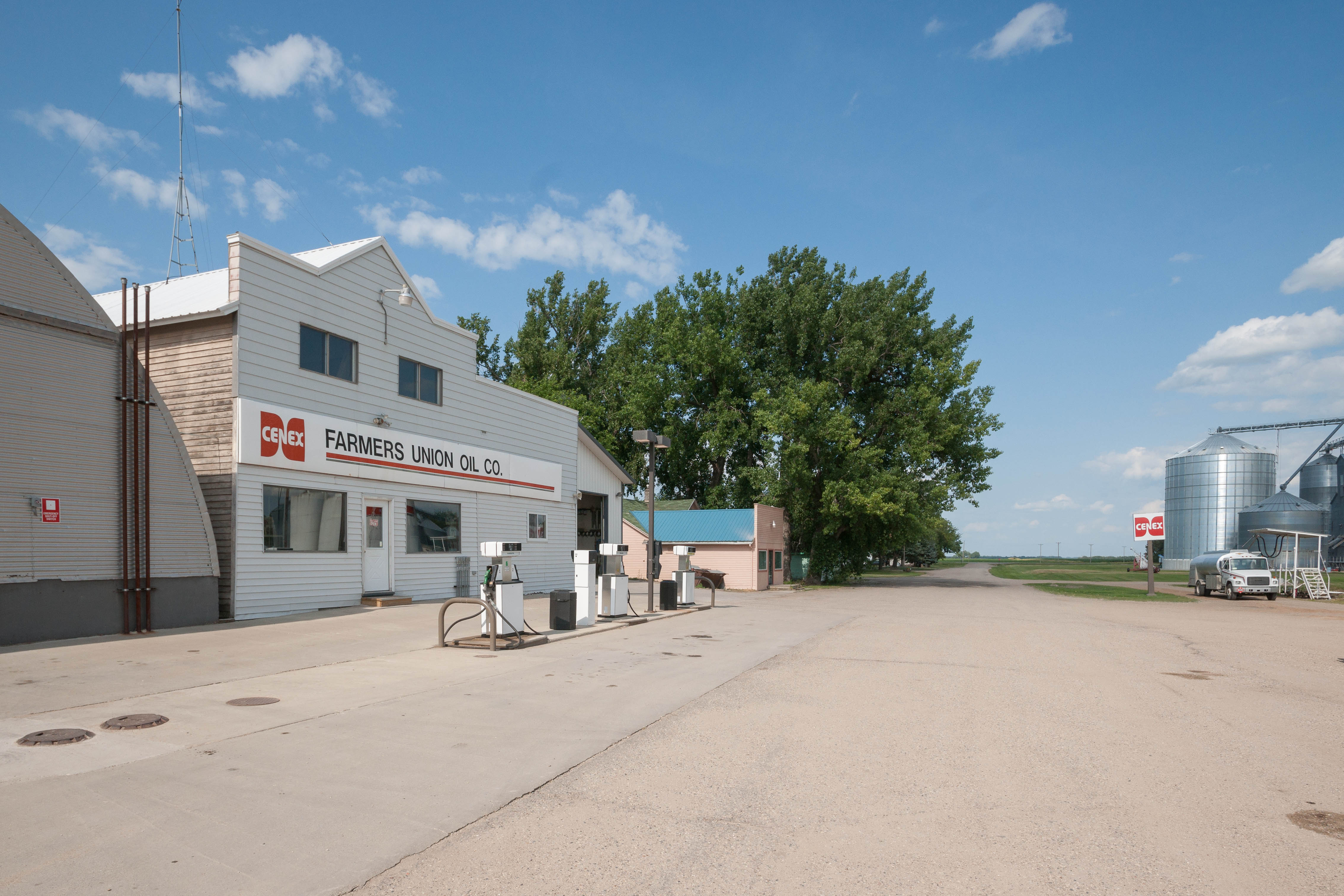
- Gas station in Embden

- Location within North Dakota
- Coordinates: 46°48′18″N 97°26′22″W
- Country: United States
- State: North Dakota
- County: Cass
- Townships: Howes, Eldred

Area
  - Total: 0.72 sq mi (1.86 km^{2})
  - Land: 0.72 sq mi (1.86 km^{2})
  - Water: 0 sq mi (0.00 km^{2})
- Elevation: 1,060 ft (320 m)

Population (2020)
  - Total: 41
  - Density: 57.1/sq mi (22.04/km^{2})
- Time zone: UTC-6 (Central (CST))
  - Summer (DST): UTC-5 (CDT)
- ZIP code: 58079 (Wheatland)
- Area code: 701
- GNIS feature ID: 2585498

Embden is a census-designated place and unincorporated community in Cass County, North Dakota, United States. Its population was 41 as of the 2020 census.

== History ==
Embden contained a post office between 1883 and 1969. The community was named after Embden, Maine, the native home of an early settler. The population was 70 in 1940.

== Demographics ==
Historical population
Census	Pop.	Note	%±
2010	59		—
2020	41		−30.5%
U.S. Decennial Census
