= Gill Township, Cass County, North Dakota =

Township in North Dakota, US

Gill Township, North Dakota
- Township
- Location within North Dakota
- Coordinates: 46°50′49″N 97°22′00″W
- Country: United States
- State: North Dakota
- County: Cass

Area
  - Total: 36.01 sq mi (93.3 km^{2})
  - Land: 35.96 sq mi (93.1 km^{2})
  - Water: 0.05 sq mi (0.13 km^{2})
- Elevation: 978 ft (298 m)

Population (2020)
  - Total: 115
  - Density: 3.20/sq mi (1.23/km^{2})
- Time zone: UTC-6 (Central (CST))
  - Summer (DST): UTC-5 (CDT)
- Area code: 701
- FIPS code: 38-30260
- GNIS feature ID: 1036367

Gill Township is a township in Cass County, North Dakota, United States. The population was 115 at the 2020 census.

== Demographics ==
As of the 2023 American Community Survey, there were an estimated 25 households.
