= Assumption Abbey (North Dakota) =

Religious house in North Dakota

Assumption Abbey of North Dakota
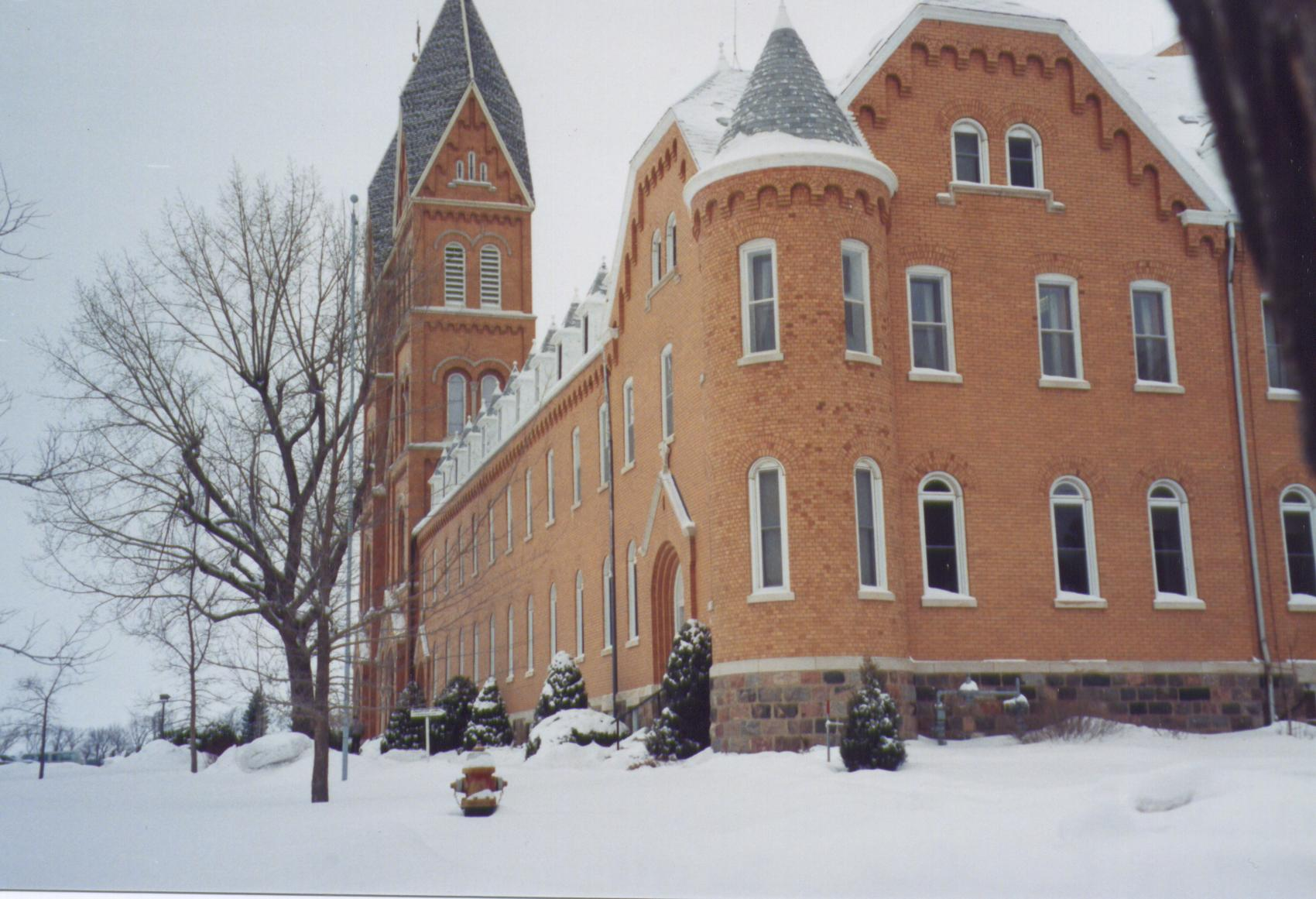
- Assumption Abbey Richardton ND as seen from the east.

- Location within North Dakota Location within the United States

Monastery information
- Other name: St. Mary’s Priory
- Established: 1893

Site
- Coordinates: 46.889°N 102.320°W

Assumption Abbey, located in Richardton, North Dakota, is a Benedictine abbey of the American-Cassinese Congregation (different from the Subiaco Cassinese Congregation), founded in 1893 by a monk from the Einsiedeln Abbey in Switzerland.

== History ==
The North Dakota community became a conventual priory on February 18, 1894. Originally called St. Gall’s, the monks relocated from the north shore of Devils Lake to the city of Richardton on June 24, 1899, and changed the name to St. Mary’s Priory.

In 1903 the Holy See raised the community to the rank of abbey and Vincent de Paul Wehrle, the founder, was elected first abbot. Wehrle would go on to become the first bishop of the Diocese of Bismarck in 1910.

On October 29, 1928, the community and its property was incorporated under the title Assumption Abbey. By decree of the Holy See, the Abbey was transferred from the Swiss-American Congregation to the American-Cassinese Congregation on October 18, 1932.

As of December 2009, there were 56 monks in the community. Assumption Abbey has a dependent daughter monastery in Bogotá, Colombia: Monasterio Benedictino de Tibatí, which runs the prestigious Colegio San Carlos.
