= Liberty Memorial Bridge =

Former bridge in North Dakota, US

- Formerly listed on the U.S. National Register of Historic Places
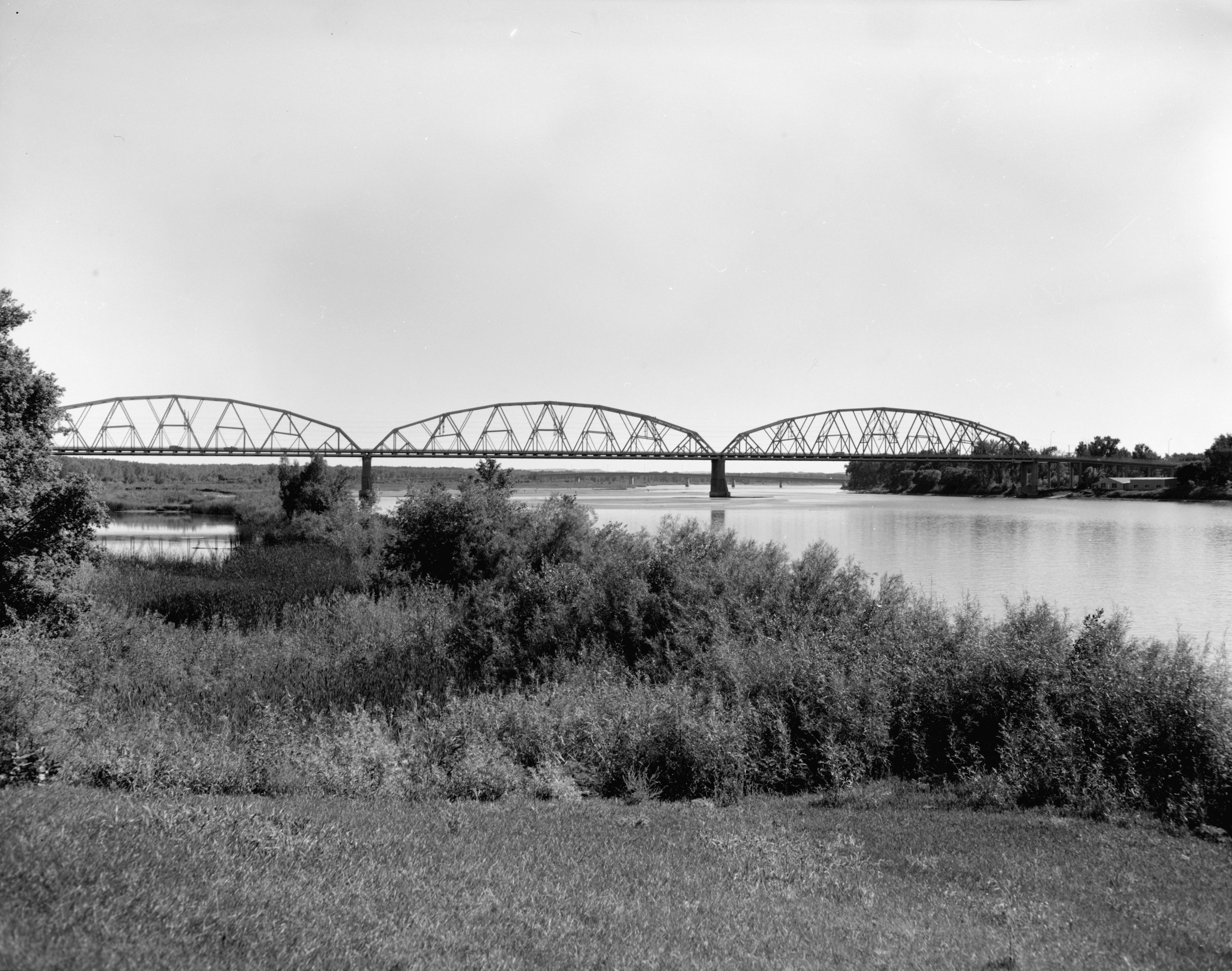

- Location within North Dakota Location within the United States
- Location: I-94 BL, across the Missouri River, Bismarck, North Dakota
- Area: 19 acres (7.7 ha)
- Built: 1920
- Built by: American Bridge Company
- Architectural style: Warren-Turner through truss
- Demolished: 2008
- MPS: Historic Roadway Bridges of North Dakota MPS
- NRHP reference No.: 97000172

Significant dates
- Added to NRHP: March 11, 1997
- Removed from NRHP: March 25, 2009

The Liberty Memorial Bridge, across the Missouri River connecting the "twin cities" of Bismarck and Mandan, North Dakota, also known as Missouri River Bridge, was a Warren-Turner through truss structure that was built in 1920. It was listed on the National Register of Historic Places in 1997. It was replaced by a new bridge in 2008 and removed from the National Register in 2009.

It was "the first roadway bridge constructed across the Missouri River, one of the most important waterways in the state" of North Dakota. Not only did the bridge connect the 'twin cities' of Bismarck and Mandan, but for the first time eastern and western North Dakota were joined by a continuous roadway. Moreover, the bridge was a final link in the coast-to-coast roadway later designated as U.S. Highway 10." Also, it is the only Warren-Turner through truss bridge ever built in the state.

== See also ==
- List of bridges documented by the Historic American Engineering Record in North Dakota
