= U.S. Route 52 in North Dakota =

Highway in North Dakota

U.S. Highway 52
- US 52 highlighted in red

Route information
- Maintained by NDDOT
- Length: 362.031 mi (582.632 km)
- Existed: 1935–present

Major junctions
- West end: Highway 39 at the Canadian border in Portal
- US 2 at Minot; US 83 in Minot; US 281 / ND 200 in Carrington; I-94 / US 281 in Jamestown; US 10 in West Fargo; I-29 / US 81 in Fargo
- East end: I-94 / US 52 at the Minnesota state line in Fargo

Location
- Country: United States
- State: North Dakota
- Counties: Burke, Renville, Ward, McHenry, Pierce, Sheridan, Wells, Foster, Stutsman, Barnes, Cass

Highway system
- United States Numbered Highway System; List; Special; Divided; North Dakota State Highway System; Interstate; US; State
| ← ND 50 | → ND 53 |

U.S. Highway 52 (US 52) is a 362-mile-long (583 km) United States Numbered Highway in the U.S. state of North Dakota, which travels from the Canada–United States border east to the Red River at Fargo. The highway connects the cities of Minot, Jamestown, Valley City, West Fargo and Fargo and travels concurrent with Interstate 94 (I-94) between Jamestown and the Minnesota state line.

== Route description ==
In North Dakota, US 52 continues from Saskatchewan Highway 39 from the Canada–United States border at North Portal, Saskatchewan and Portal, North Dakota to the Red River in Fargo, a distance of 361 miles (581 km). US 52 passes through Burke, Ward, Renville, McHenry, Pierce, Sheridan, Wells, Foster, Stutsman, Barnes, and Cass counties.

US 52 is a two-lane highway in most areas, except for four lane segments between Burlington and Minot, Jamestown to Buchanan, and Jamestown to Fargo. Some segments in Fargo are six lanes.

From a point halfway between Foxholm and Burlington, and the southeast edge of Minot, US 52 is co-signed with US 2. As US 2/US 52 passes through the south part of Minot, it intersects with the US 83 Bypass, and then US 83 itself. Further south, US 52 is also co-signed with US 281 for 44 miles (71 km) between Carrington and Jamestown. The route through Jamestown follows 5th St. NW, 1st Ave., and the former I-94 Business Loop (the signs previously followed the eastern half, but now follow the shorter western half). From Jamestown east to the Minnesota border at Fargo, the highway is co-signed with Interstate 94.

== Major intersections ==
| County | Location | mi | km | Destinations | Notes |
|---|---|---|---|---|---|
| Canada–United States border | | 0.000 | 0.000 | Highway 39 north – Estevan | Continuation into Saskatchewan, Canada |
| Canada–United States border | | 0.000 | 0.000 | Portal–North Portal Border Crossing | |
| Burke | | 7.416 | 11.935 | ND 5 west – Crosby | West end of ND 5 concurrency |
| Burke | | 20.361 | 32.768 | ND 8 north – Northgate | West end of ND 8 concurrency |
| Burke | Bowbells | 27.138 | 43.674 | ND 8 south – Bowbells, Stanley | East end of ND 8 concurrency |
| Ward | | 36.847 | 59.299 | ND 5 east – Mohall | East end of ND 5 concurrency |
| Ward | | 53.831 | 86.633 | ND 50 west – Coulee, Powers Lake | |
| Renville | No major junctions | | | | |
| Ward | Carpio | 67.910 | 109.291 | ND 28 – Berthold | |
| Ward | | 82.696 | 133.086 | US 2 west – Williston | West end of US 2 concurrency |
| Ward | Minot | 92.181 | 148.351 | US 83 Byp. north – Air Base | |
| Ward | Minot | 92.625 | 149.065 | US 2 Bus. east / US 52 Bus. east (W Burdick Expressway) | |
| Ward | Minot | 94.665 | 152.349 | US 83 (S Broadway Street) – Air Base, Bismarck | |
| Ward | Minot | 97.052 | 156.190 | US 2 east – Devils Lake US 52 Bus. west (Valley Street) | East end of US 2 concurrency |
| McHenry | Velva | 116.858 | 188.065 | ND 41 – Turtle Lake | |
| McHenry | | 120.210 | 193.459 | ND 97 west | |
| McHenry | | 137.723 | 221.644 | ND 53 south – Kief, Butte | |
| McHenry | | 141.411 | 227.579 | ND 14 north – Towner | West end of ND 14 concurrency |
| McHenry | Anamoose | 151.884 | 244.434 | ND 14 south – Denhoff | East end of ND 14 concurrency |
| Pierce | No major junctions | | | | |
| Sheridan | No major junctions | | | | |
| Wells | Harvey | 167.181 | 269.052 | ND 91 east (7th Street W) – Harvey, Rugby | |
| Wells | Harvey | 167.711 | 269.905 | US 52 Bus. east (10th Street W) | |
| Wells | Harvey | 167.952 | 270.293 | ND 3 north – Harvey, Rugby | West end of ND 3 concurrency |
| Wells | | 169.979 | 273.555 | US 52 Bus. west / ND 3 south – Hurdsfield | East end of ND 3 concurrency |
| Wells | Fessenden | 185.548 | 298.611 | ND 15 east – New Rockford | |
| Wells | | 198.717 | 319.804 | ND 200 west – McClusky | West end of ND 200 concurrency |
| Wells | | 208.720 | 335.902 | ND 30 north – Cathay | Mile marker 207 - 208 is vulnerable to flooding by pipestem river. Which happen in spring of 2009, and Fall of 2019. |
| Foster | Carrington | 222.719 | 358.431 | US 281 north / ND 200 east – New Rockford, Cooperstown | East end of ND 200 concurrency; west end of US 281 concurrency |
| Foster–Stutsman county line | | 232.410 | 374.028 | ND 9 east – Kensal | |
| Stutsman | Pingree | 244.865 | 394.072 | ND 36 west – Woodworth | |
| Stutsman | | 263.034 | 423.312 | US 52 Truck (By-pass) east / US 281 Truck (By-pass) south | Jamestown Truck Bypass to I-94 |
| Stutsman | Jamestown | 265.635 | 427.498 | ND 20 north (4th Street NE) | |
| Stutsman | Jamestown | 267.632 | 430.712 | I-94 / US 52 Truck (By-pass) west / US 281 Truck (By-pass) north – Bismarck US 281 south – Edgeley, Ellendale | Exit 258 on I-94; east end of US 281 concurrency; west end of I-94 concurrency |
See I-94
| Red River of the North | | 362.031 | 582.632 | North Dakota–Minnesota line | |
| Red River of the North | | 362.031 | 582.632 | I-94 east / US 52 east – Minneapolis | Continuation into Minnesota |
1.000 mi = 1.609 km; 1.000 km = 0.621 mi: Concurrency terminus

== Minot business route ==
U.S. Highway 52 Business
- Location: Minot, North Dakota
- Length: 5.865 mi (9.439 km)

U.S. Highway 52 Business (US 52 Bus.) in Minot, North Dakota, begins at US 2/US 52. It is known as the Burdick Expressway, and Valley Street Southeast. US 52 is a bypass of the downtown area while US 52 Bus. goes through the downtown area. It then intersects US 83 (Broadway) in downtown. A few miles later, US 52 Bus. separates from US 2 Bus. US 52 Bus. heads southeast and meets US 52 southeast of Minot, while US 2 Bus. heads east to meet US 2 east of Minot.

=== Major intersections ===
The entire route is in Ward County.

| Location | mi | km | Destinations | Notes |
|---|---|---|---|---|
| | 0.000 | 0.000 | US 52 / US 2 / US 83 Byp. / Sundown Drive | Western terminus; west end of US 2 Bus. concurrency |
| Minot | 2.108 | 3.392 | US 83 (South Broadway) | |
| Minot | 2.613 | 4.205 | US 2 Bus. east / Burdick Expressway E | East end of US 2 Bus. concurrency |
| Minot city limit | | | US 52 – Jamestown | Eastern terminus |
1.000 mi = 1.609 km; 1.000 km = 0.621 mi: Concurrency terminus

== Former Minot bypass route ==
U.S. Highway 52 Bypass
- Location: Minot, North Dakota

== Harvey business route ==
U.S. Highway 52 Business
- Location: Harvey
- Length: 2.048 mi (3.296 km)

U.S. Highway 52 Bus. (US 52 Business) is a 2.048-mile-long (3.296 km)north–south US highway in the U.S. state of North Dakota. US 52 Bus. southern terminus is at U.S. Highway 52/ND 3 south of Harvey, and the northern terminus is at US 52 north of Harvey. It runs on 10th St. and Brewster St. through Harvey.

The entire route is in Wells County.

| Location | mi | km | Destinations | Notes |
|---|---|---|---|---|
| | 0.000 | 0.000 | ND 3 south | Southern terminus |
| | 2.048 | 3.296 | US 52 – Minot, Jamestown | Northern terminus |
1.000 mi = 1.609 km; 1.000 km = 0.621 mi

== See also ==
U.S. Route 52
| Previous state: Terminus | North Dakota | Next state: Minnesota |
