= Bismarck Expressway =

Highway in North Dakota

- Bismarck Expressway highlighted: I-194 in blue; ND 810 in red; I-94 Bus. in green

Route information
- Maintained by NDDOT
- Length: 8.5 mi (13.7 km)
- Component highways: I-194 in Mandan; ND 810 in Mandan and Bismarck; I-94 BL in Bismarck

Major junctions
- West end: I-94 in Mandan
- East end: I-94 / US 83 in Bismarck

Location
- Country: United States
- State: North Dakota
- Counties: Morton, Burleigh

Highway system
- Interstate Highway System; Main; Auxiliary; Suffixed; Business; Future; North Dakota State Highway System; Interstate; US; State
| ← ND 297 | → ND 1804 |

The Bismarck Expressway is a state highway in Mandan and Bismarck, North Dakota, in the United States. It carries two unsigned highways: Interstate 194 (I-194) from its west end at exit 156 of I-94 to I-94 Business (I-94 Bus.) in Mandan, and North Dakota Highway 810 (ND 810) from I-94 Bus. in Mandan, around the south side of Bismarck back to I-94 Bus. in Bismarck. I-94 Bus. takes the designation from the end of ND 810 to the designation's eastern terminus at I-94 and US Highway 83 (US 83). The portion in Mandan, even where it is ND 810, is a freeway; once it crosses the Missouri River into Bismarck, it becomes a four-lane surface road.

== Route description ==
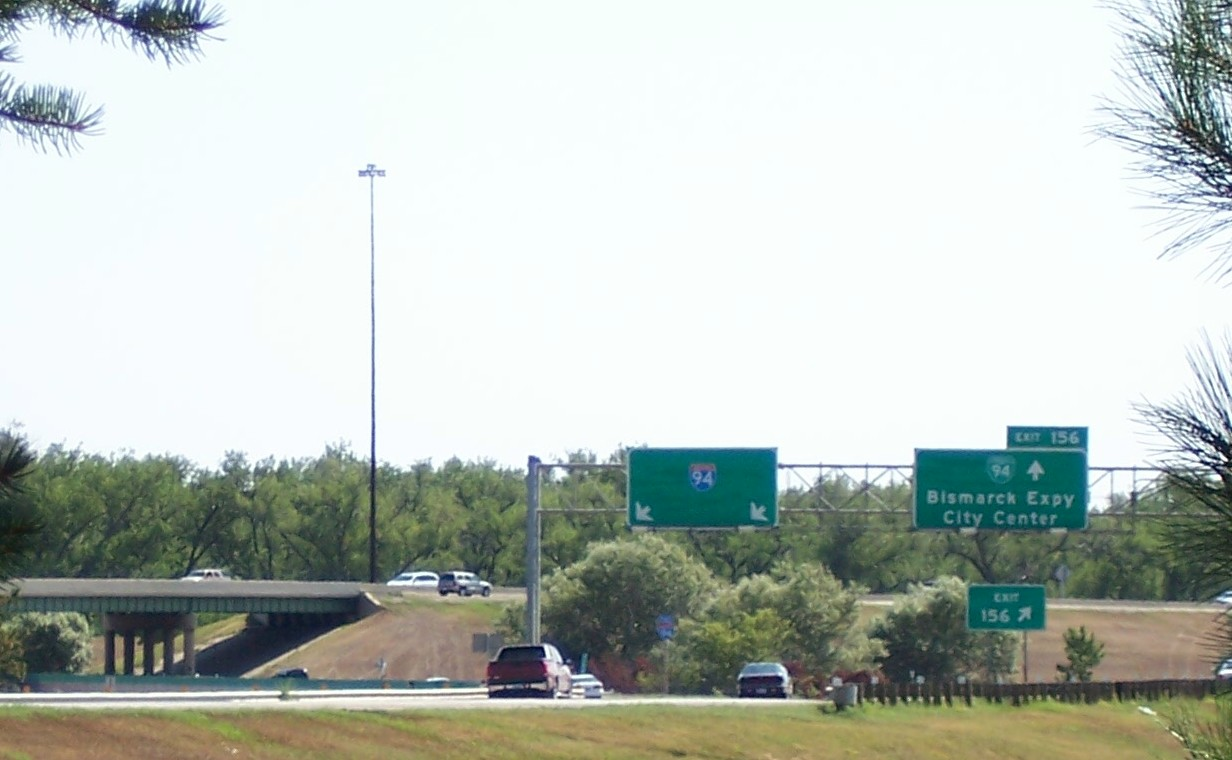
Eastbound I-94 exit 156 to the Bismarck Expressway

The Bismarck Expressway starts at a trumpet interchange with I-94's exit 156 and begins to run southeast through the eastern portion of the city of Mandan. The road parallels the Missouri River as it passes under a railroad operated by BNSF Railway. Farther south, the highway interchanges with I-94 Bus. (Memorial Highway), where the I-194 designation ends. ND 810 shares a diamond interchange with McKenzie Drive, then curves to the east and crosses the Missouri River. Upon doing so, it leaves Mandan and Morton County, and enters Bismarck and Burleigh County.

The roadway becomes a four-lane surface road east of the Missouri River, beginning at the road's first intersection east of the river, with Washington Street. The Bismarck Expressway and ND 810 continue east and intersect ND 1804 at a one way pair with 9th and 7th streets. The roadway then rolls farther to the east, before bending to the northeast and passing over the BNSF line and Hay Creek. It then turns north and intersects Main Avenue. At this intersection, ND 810 terminates, while I-94 Bus. joins from the east and continues north. I-94 Bus. and the Bismarck Expressway terminate about two miles (3.2 km) north of here at a diamond interchange with I-94 and US 83.

== Exit list ==
All exits are unnumbered.

| County | Location | mi | km | Destinations | Notes |
|---|---|---|---|---|---|
| Morton | Mandan | 0.0 | 0.0 | I-94 – Fargo, Billings | Westbound exit and eastbound entrance |
| Morton | Mandan | 1.1 | 1.8 | I-94 BL (Main Avenue, Memorial Highway) – Bismarck, Mandan | East end of I-194; west end of ND 810 |
| Morton | Mandan | 1.6 | 2.6 | McKenzie Drive – Mandan | |
| Missouri River | | | | Expressway Bridge | |
| Burleigh | Bismarck | 3.3 | 5.3 | Washington Street | At-grade intersection |
| Burleigh | Bismarck | | | East end of freeway | |
| Burleigh | Bismarck | 3.9 | 6.3 | ND 1804 (7th Street) | A one-way street only going southbound between Boulevard Avenue and Bismarck Expressway |
| Burleigh | Bismarck | 4.2 | 6.8 | ND 1804 (9th Street North, University Drive South) – Bismarck Municipal Airport, United Tribes, University of Mary | 9th Street is a one-way street only going northbound between Bismarck Expressway and Boulevard Avenue |
| Burleigh | Bismarck | 6.8 | 10.9 | I-94 BL west (Main Avenue) | East end of ND 810; south end of BL I-94 concurrency |
| Burleigh | Bismarck | 8.5 | 13.7 | I-94 / US 83 – Fargo, Billings | Eastern terminus |
1.000 mi = 1.609 km; 1.000 km = 0.621 mi: Incomplete access; Route transition
