= List of Interstate Highways in North Dakota =

- Sample markers

- Map of North Dakota highway system with Interstates highlighted in blue

Highway names
- Interstates: Interstate X (I-X)
- US Highways: U.S. Route X (US X)
- State: N.D. Highway X (ND X)

System links
- North Dakota State Highway System; Interstate; US; State

The Interstate Highways in North Dakota are the segments of the Dwight D. Eisenhower National System of Interstate and Defense Highways owned and maintained by the North Dakota Department of Transportation (NDDOT) in the US state of North Dakota.

== Mainline highways ==
Number	Length (mi)	Length (km)	Southern or western terminus	Northern or eastern terminus	Formed	Removed	Notes
I-29	217.517	350.060	I-29/U.S. 81 at South Dakota state line	PTH 75 at Canada–US border near Pembina	1958	current	
I-31	154	248	I-94/U.S. 52 in Fargo	PTH 75 at Canada–US border near Pembina	1957	1958	Replaced by I-29
I-94	352.454	567.220	I-94 at Montana state line	I-94 / US 52 at Minnesota state line	1958	current	
I-194	1.072	1.725	I-94 in Mandan	ND 810 in Bismarck	1958	current	Part of the Bismarck Expressway; I-194 is unsigned
Former

== Business routes ==
Number	Length (mi)	Length (km)	Southern or western terminus	Northern or eastern terminus	Formed	Removed	Notes
I-94 BL	—	—	—	—	—	—	Serves Medora
I-94 BL	—	—	—	—	—	—	Serves Dickinson
I-94 BL	—	—	—	—	—	—	Serves Mandan and Bismarck
I-94 BL	—	—	—	—	—	2004	Served Jamestown
I-94 BL	—	—	—	—	—	—	Serves Valley City
I-94 BL	—	—	—	—	—	—	Serves Fargo
