= Hazelton Township, Emmons County, North Dakota =

Coordinates: 46°31′00″N 100°13′01″W

Hazelton Township is a former township of Emmons County, North Dakota, United States. The township disbanded on January 1, 2001, and is now part of the unorganized territory of North Emmons. The township recorded a population of 70 during the 2000 Census.

It lay in the northern part of the county, surrounding the city of Hazelton, and it bordered the following other townships within Emmons County:

- Lincoln Township (defunct) — east
- Buchanan Valley Township — northwest corner
