= Carl Larvick =

American politician

Carl Larvick (June 19, 1882 – April 10, 1960) was a United States politician and state representative from North Dakota. He served in the North Dakota House of Representatives from 1927 to 1930.

== Political career ==
Larson represented the 26th Legislative District, which included Emmons County and Kidder County.

== Personal life ==
He was married to Clara (Holm) Larvick (1887–1972). They were the parents of three children; Martin, Harold and Margaret. He and his family operated a farm in Temvik, North Dakota. He was buried in Greenwood Cemetery in Bayfield County, Wisconsin.
