= Campbell Township, Emmons County, North Dakota =

Township in Emmons County, North Dakota

Coordinates: 46°36′00″N 099°57′31″W

Campbell Township is the only township in Emmons County, North Dakota, United States. Its population as of the 2000 Census was 66. It lies in the northeastern corner of the county and borders the following other former townships within Emmons County:

- Tell Township (defunct) — south
- Lincoln Township (defunct) — southwest corner
