= Temvik, North Dakota =

- Ghost town
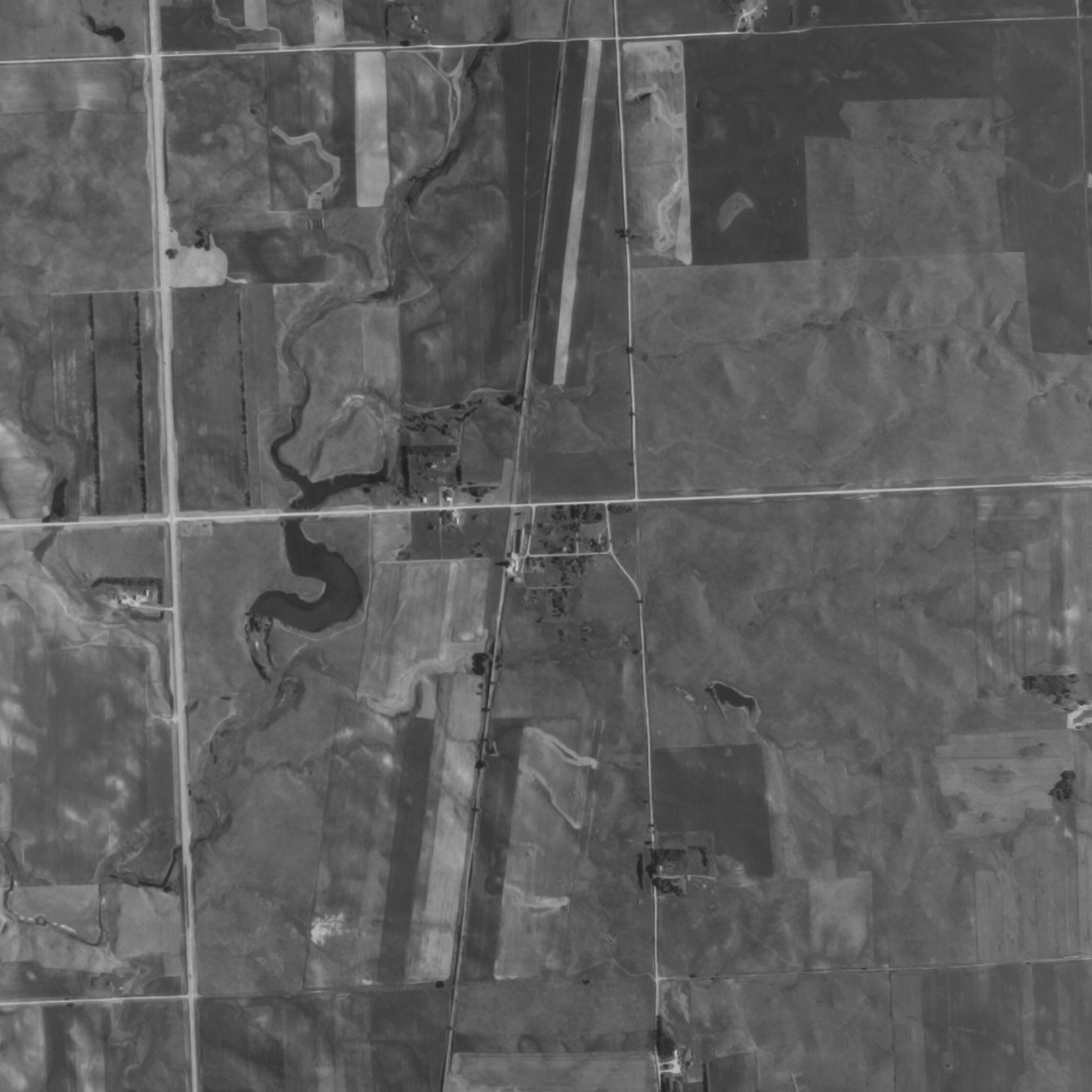
- Aerial photo of Temvik as it appeared in 1991

- Location within the state of North Dakota
- Coordinates: 46°22′11″N 100°15′30″W
- Country: United States
- State: North Dakota
- County: Emmons
- Founded: 1904
- Elevation: 1,939 ft (591 m)

Population (2000)
  - Total: 0
- Time zone: UTC-6 (Central (CST))
  - Summer (DST): UTC-5 (CDT)
- ZIP Code: 58574 (Until 1968); 58552
- Area code: 701
- FIPS code: 38-78420
- GNIS feature ID: 1032451

Temvik is a ghost town in Emmons County, North Dakota, United States. It is situated between Linton and Hazelton. The town had a school and several grain elevators early in the twentieth century; all that remains today is a farm.

Temvik Cemetery is located west of the town along U.S. Route 83.

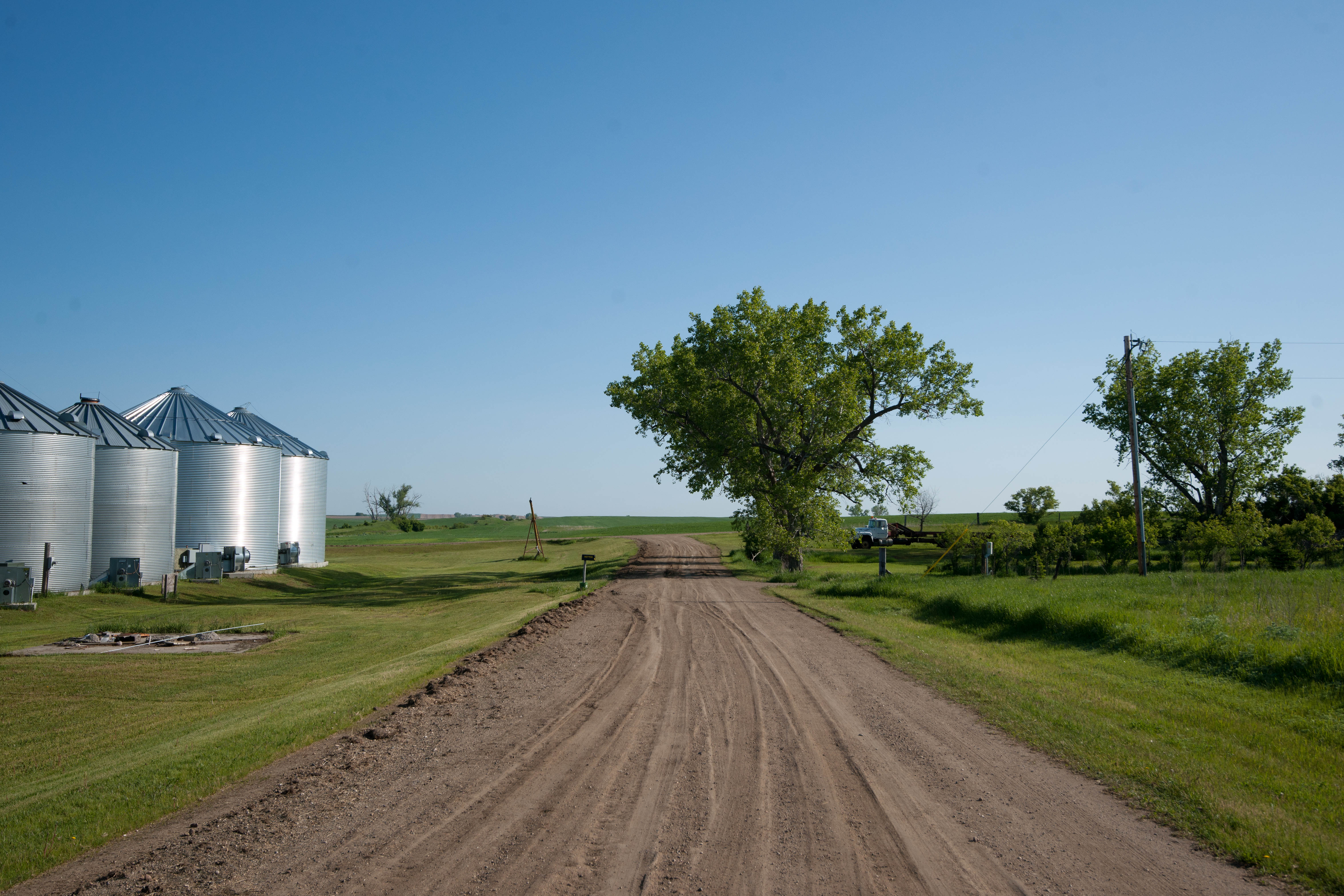
Dirt road in Temvik

== History ==
Temvik was founded in 1904 as the town of Godkin. It was alternatively known as Brophy after local store owner L.W. Brophy. The town was renamed Larvik in 1908, and after a short-lived dispute with the nearby townsite Templeton (named after the Tempel brothers), was renamed Temvik in 1911 after the two towns merged. Residents originally wanted to name the combined town Union City, but that application was denied by the Postal Service.

Temvik operated a post office with the zip code 58574 from 1911 until 1968, when the post office was closed. Mail service is handled through Linton to the south, and Temvik shares Linton's zip code.

== Geographic location ==
Temvik is located in the central part of Emmons County along U.S. Route 83. It is part of the U.S. Census designated West Emmons Unorganized Territory, but was once part of the now defunct McCulley Township, which dissolved in 1998.

== Demographics ==
Temvik had a population of around 200 during the early 20th century. In 1960, it was estimated at around 45 people. The surrounding McCulley Township recorded a population of 160 during the 1960 Census, which declined to 79 as of the 1990 Census.

As an unincorporated community, the U.S. Census Bureau does not specifically track its population. According to the 2000 Census, Temvik is located in census tract 9664, block group 1, and assigned blocks 1448 through 1452. The population of each of these census blocks was zero in 2000, with the exception of block 1449, which showed a population of just 4 individuals.

Many of the settlers in the area are of German or German-from-Russia descent.

== Notable people ==
- Anton Larson, North Dakota state representative (1929 – 1930 and 1939 – 1940). State senator (1931 – 1934).
- Carl Larvick, North Dakota state representative (1927 – 1930).
- Ray Stedman, pastor and author
