= Anton Larson =

American politician (1873–1965)

Anton Larson (1873 – 1965) was a United States politician and state senator from North Dakota. He served two terms in the North Dakota House of Representatives from 1929 to 1930 and again from 1939 to 1940. He also served in the North Dakota Senate from 1931 to 1934. He lived in Temvik, North Dakota. He died during 1965 and was buried at Saint Mary's Cemetery in Bismarck, North Dakota.

== Political career ==
Larson represented the 26th Legislative District, which included Emmons County and Kidder County, and later just Emmons County.
