= Sibley Lake =

Sibley Lake may refer to:

- Sibley Lake (Minnesota), a lake
- Sibley Lake Dam, Louisiana
- Sibley Lake, North Dakota National Natural Landmark
- Sibley Lake National Wildlife Refuge, North Dakota
