= Sibley Township, Minnesota =

Sibley Township is the name of some places in the U.S. state of Minnesota:

- Sibley Township, Crow Wing County, Minnesota
- Sibley Township, Sibley County, Minnesota
