= Lake George National Wildlife Refuge =

Wildlife refuge in North Dakota, United States

Coordinates: 46°43′30″N 99°29′21″W

Lake George National Wildlife Refuge is a National Wildlife Refuge in Kidder County, North Dakota. It a privately owned property on Lake George (also known as Salt Lake) near Streeter, North Dakota, with the FWS having refuge easement rights to control flooding, and is one of six easement refuges managed under Long Lake National Wildlife Refuge. It is closed to hunting.
