= William P. Tuttle =

American politician

- Born: William Pierce Tuttle; November 4, 1847 November 4, Rutland, Jefferson County, New York, United States
- Died: October 11, 1924 (aged 76); North Dakota
- Occupation(s): Financier, entrepreneur, and land owner
- Known for: Tuttle, North Dakota is named after him
- Title: North Dakota Legislature from Dawson, North Dakota
- Term: 12th Legislative Assembly (1911-12)
- Parents: Jeremiah J. Tuttle (father); Renew Pierce Tuttle (mother)

Colonel William Pierce Tuttle (November 4, 1847 – October 1924) was a financier, entrepreneur, and land owner predominantly in North Dakota for which the town of Tuttle, North Dakota is named.

== Biography ==
Born November 4, 1847, in the town of Rutland, Jefferson County, New York. He was the son of Jeremiah J. Tuttle and Renew Pierce Tuttle. His early life was spent on the farm. Tuttle was a member of the North Dakota Legislature from Dawson, North Dakota. Tuttle was a candidate for North Dakota's second congressional district for the United States Congress in 1914, but was defeated by George M. Young.

Later in life, Tuttle became a member of the Chicago Board of Trade. He was a principal in the Dakota Land and Townsite Company. He died in 1924 on either October 5 or October 12, the exact date being reported differently, after a year of illness. At the time of his death Col. Tuttle reportedly owned about 11,000 acres (45 km^{2}) of land in Billings County, North Dakota and a large farm near Ellendale, North Dakota.

== Bibliography ==
Notes

References

- Gavett, Joseph L. (2008). North Dakota: Counties, Towns & People, Part 2. Watchmaker Publishing, Ltd. ISBN 9781603861915. - Total pages: 394
- North Dakota Legislative Assembly (2019). "Dakota Lawmakers" (PDF). North Dakota Legislative Assembly.
