= Slade National Wildlife Refuge =

Protected area in North Dakota, United States

- IUCN category IV (habitat/species management area)
- Location within the United States
- Location: Kidder County, North Dakota, United States
- Nearest city: Dawson, North Dakota
- Coordinates: 46°50′16″N 99°43′20″W
- Area: 3,000 acres (12 km^{2})
- Established: 1941
- Governing body: U.S. Fish and Wildlife Service
- Website: Slade National Wildlife Refuge

Slade National Wildlife Refuge is a 3,000-acre (12 km^{2}) National Wildlife Refuge in Kidder County, North Dakota. It was established in 1941 when the property was donated by G.T. Slade, a Northern Pacific Railroad executive. It is managed under the Long Lake National Wildlife Refuge. It contains Harker Lake and Upper Harker Lake.

== History ==
Historically, the marshes and wetlands south of the town of Dawson, North Dakota support a large quantity of migratory waterfowl, which have attracted hunters. George Theron Slade, Third Vice President of the Northern Pacific Railroad, enjoyed hunting game birds in the area. In 1924, he began purchasing land around Harker Lake for the use of a private shooting club. Slade invested a considerable sum into improving the land with the aim of making it more attractive for waterfowl. Improvements included planting and harvesting a limited amount of organically-grown grain to provide bird feed, and a well capable of pumping 60,500 liters (16,000 gallons) of water per hour to keep the lake level from falling during drought. In 1940, Slade donated the land to the United States Fish and Wildlife Service, which used the land to establish the Slade National Wildlife Refuge.

== Wildlife ==
The refuge is used by waterfowl approximately nine months out of the year. The most common species to be found include Canada geese, mallards, snow geese, ring-necked pheasants, sharp-tailed grouse, and Hungarian partridges. White-tailed deer are common around the lake, and some coyotes live in the area. A majority of the grasslands around the perimeter of the lake are introduced grasses and legumes.
