= Lake Williams, North Dakota =

- Unincorporated community
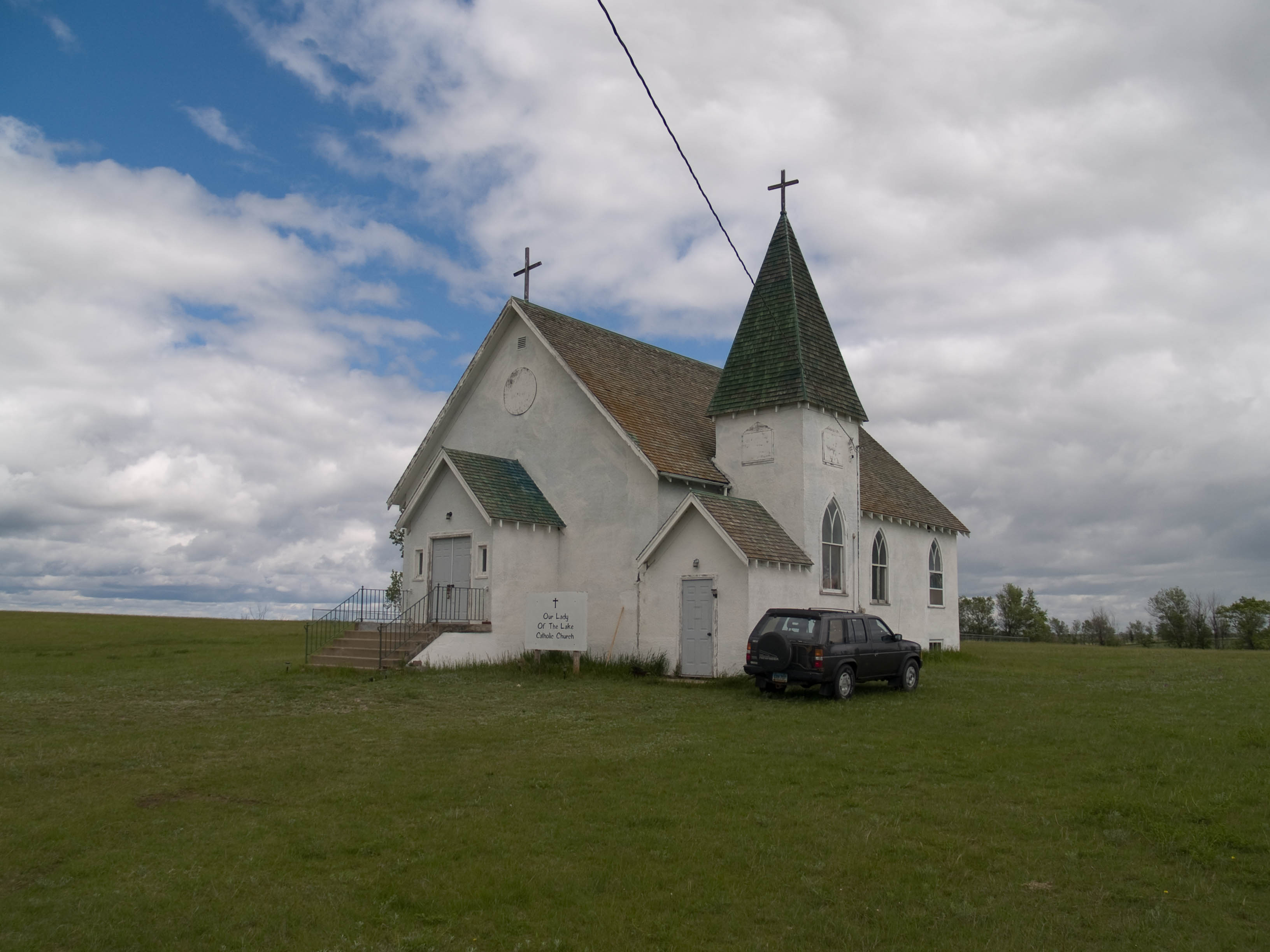
- Our Lady of the Lake Catholic Church in Lake Williams, North Dakota, 2008

- Location within North Dakota Location within the United States
- Coordinates: 47°08′05″N 99°36′52″W
- Country: United States
- State: North Dakota
- County: Kidder
- Elevation: 1,808 ft (551 m)
- Time zone: UTC-6 (Central (CST))
  - Summer (DST): UTC-5 (CDT)
- Area code: 701
- GNIS feature ID: 1029810

Lake Williams is an unincorporated community in Kidder County, North Dakota, United States. Lake Williams is located on the north shore of Lake Williams near North Dakota Highway 36, 4.6 miles (7.4 km) west-northwest of Pettibone.
