= Hutchinson Lake National Wildlife Refuge =

National Wildlife Refuge in North Dakota, US

Coordinates: 47°10′30″N 100°05′49″W

Hutchinson Lake National Wildlife Refuge is a National Wildlife Refuge in Kidder County, North Dakota. It is managed under Long Lake National Wildlife Refuge.

This is a limited-interest national wildlife refuge. The FWS has an easement on private property allowing it to manage wildlife habitat, but the land remains private property. There is no public access except from adjacent public roads. Limited-interest refuges were created in the 1930s and 1940s in response to declining waterfowl populations and the need to get people back to work during the Great Depression. Many landowners sold easements allowing the federal government to regulate water levels and restrict hunting.
