= Appert Lake National Wildlife Refuge =

Protected area in North Dakota, US

- IUCN category VI (protected area with sustainable use of natural resources)
- Location within the United States
- Location: Emmons County, North Dakota, United States
- Nearest city: Hazelton, North Dakota
- Coordinates: 46°27′08″N 100°13′24″W
- Area: 1,978 acres (800 ha)
- Established: 1935
- Governing body: U.S. Fish and Wildlife Service
- Website: Long Lake Lake National Wildlife Refuge Complex

Appert Lake National Wildlife Refuge is a National Wildlife Refuge in Emmons County, North Dakota. It is a privately owned property with refuge easement rights for flooding, and is one of five easement refuges managed under Long Lake National Wildlife Refuge. It is closed to hunting. It was established to provide a stable water area and safe haven for migrating waterfowl in response to declining populations during the Dust Bowl era of the 1930s. The refuge centers on a wooded prairie wetland which provides relatively unique habitat in an agriculturally dominated area. The refuge is used by wood ducks, American wigeon, green-winged teal, mallards, pintails, gadwalls and a host of woodland passerine bird species.
