= Appert =

Appert is a surname. Notable people with the surname include:

- Benjamin Nicolas Marie Appert (1797–1847), French philanthropist
- Eugène Appert (1814–1867), French painter
- Nicolas Appert (1749–1841), the French inventor of airtight food preservation

== See also ==
- Appert Lake National Wildlife Refuge, Emmons County, North Dakota
- Appert topology, named for Appert (1934), an example of a topology on the set Z+ = {1, 2, 3, ...} of positive integers
- Appert's tetraka or Appert's greenbul (Xanthomixis apperti), a small passerine bird endemic to the south-west of Madagascar
- Nicholas Appert Award, awarded every year since 1942 by the Chicago Section of the Institute of Food Technologists
