= Sibley Lake (Kidder County, North Dakota) =

Lake in the state of North Dakota, United States

- Location within North Dakota
- Location: Kidder County, North Dakota
- Coordinates: 46°57′17″N 99°44′10″W
- Type: Lake
- Max. length: 2 miles (3.2 km)
- Max. width: 4,275 feet (1,303 m)
- Surface area: 1,304 acres (528 ha)
- Average depth: 16.4 feet (5.0 m)
- Max. depth: 28.9 feet (8.8 m)
- Water volume: 31,355.6 acre-feet (38,676,600 m^{3})
- Shore length^{1}: 9.4 miles (15.1 km)
- Surface elevation: 1,732 feet (528 m)
- ^{1} Shore length is not a well-defined measure.

Sibley Lake is a body of water located six miles north of Dawson in Kidder County, North Dakota. The lake has a surface area listed at 1,304 acres (528 ha). It is fished for walleye and perch. In 1975, Sibley Lake was designated as a National Natural Landmark by the National Park Service.
