= Pete Naaden =

American politician (1927–2026)

Member of the North Dakota Senate from the 30th district
- In office 1973–2000

Personal details
- Born: August 14, 1927 Braddock, North Dakota, U.S.
- Died: May 14, 2026 (aged 98) Bismarck, North Dakota, U.S.
- Party: Republican
- Profession: Farmer, rancher

Lawrence Lyle "Pete" Naaden (August 14, 1927 – May 14, 2026) was an American politician and a member of the North Dakota State Senate. He represented the 30th district from 1973 to 2000 as a member of the Republican party. As a farmer and a rancher, he owned a family ranch at Braddock, North Dakota. Naaden died May 14, 2026, at the age of 98.
