= Crystal Springs Fountain =

Coordinates: 46°52′47″N 99°27′26″W

- U.S. National Register of Historic Places
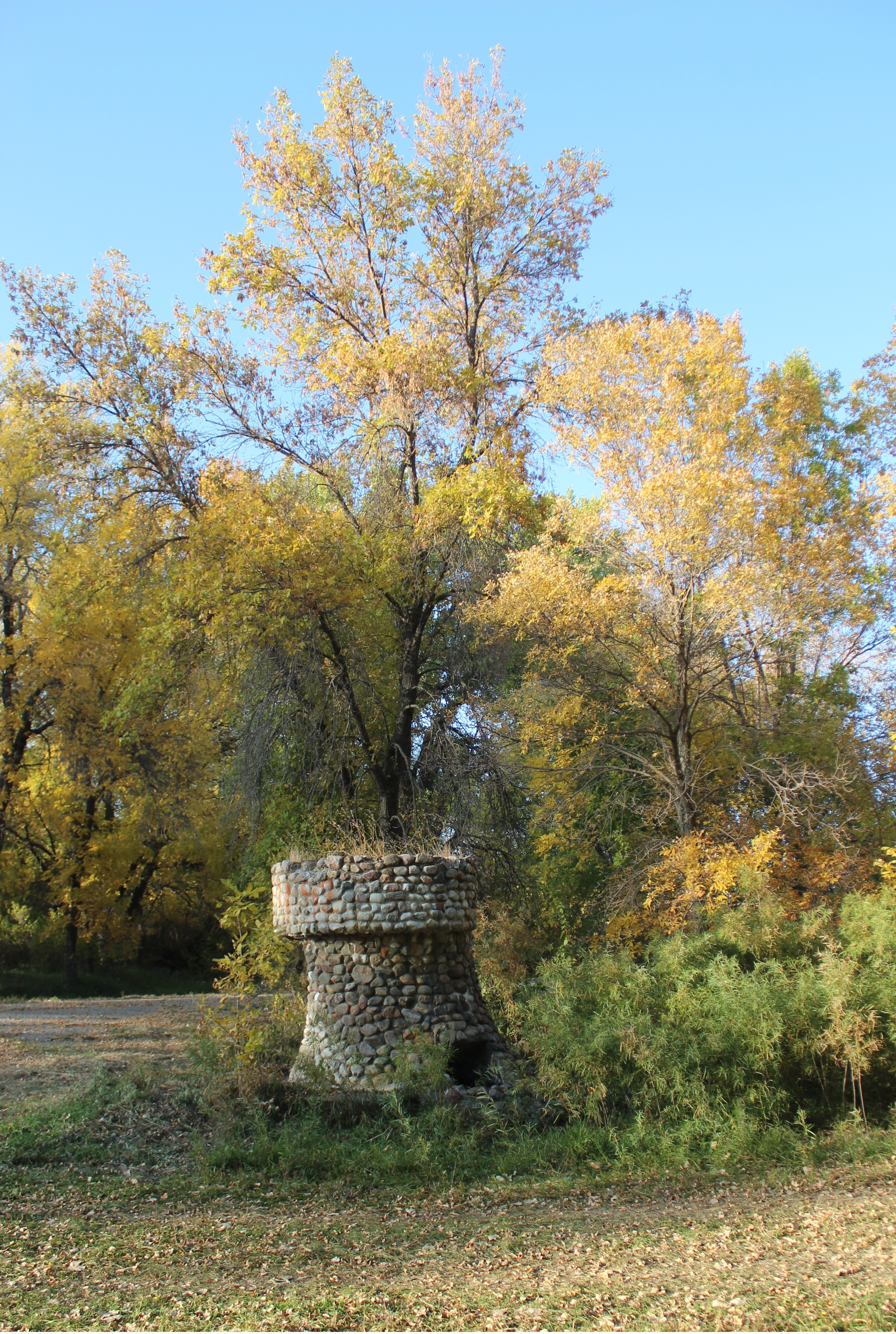

- Location within North Dakota Location within the United States
- Nearest city: Crystal Springs
- Built: 1935
- Built by: Art Geisler
- NRHP reference No.: 10000999
- Added to NRHP: December 7, 2010

The Crystal Springs Fountain is a historic roadside fountain along old U.S. Route 10 near Crystal Springs, North Dakota. It was listed on the National Register of Historic Places in 2010. It provided spring water and was a rest stop for travelers.

The fountain, fed by an artesian well, consists of an elevated reservoir that leads down to an open drinking fountain. The fountain, made of local fieldstone, was constructed in 1935, by stonemason Art Geisler as a replacement for "the old iron pipe from which travelers used to obtain a cool drink of spring water while motoring on No. 10." Its construction was sponsored by the state highway department under the auspices of the Works Progress Administration. The fountain is located in a clearing adjacent to Crystal Springs Lake.
