= Sibley Township, Crow Wing County, Minnesota =

Former Township in Minnesota, United States

Sibley Township
- Former Township
- Location within the state of Minnesota Sibley Township (the United States)
- Coordinates: 46°34′23″N 94°18′29″W
- Country: United States
- State: Minnesota
- County: Crow Wing

Area
  - Total: 16.4 sq mi (42.6 km^{2})
  - Land: 14.9 sq mi (38.6 km^{2})
  - Water: 1.6 sq mi (4.1 km^{2})
- Elevation: 1,276 ft (389 m)

Population (2000)
  - Total: 855
  - Density: 57/sq mi (22.2/km^{2})
- Time zone: UTC-6 (Central (CST))
  - Summer (DST): UTC-5 (CDT)
- FIPS code: 27-60106
- GNIS feature ID: 0665607

Sibley Township is a former township in Crow Wing County, Minnesota, United States. The population was 855 at the 2000 census. On June 4, 2002, the entire township was annexed to the neighboring city of Pequot Lakes, thus rendering the township government defunct.

The former township took its name from Sibley Lake.

== Geography ==
According to the United States Census Bureau in the 2000 census, the township had a total area of 16.5 square miles (42.6 km^{2}), of which 14.9 square miles (38.6 km^{2}) is land and 1.6 square miles (4.1 km^{2}) (9.54%) is water. The township was not listed as a separate entity in the 2010 census.

== Demographics ==
As of the census of 2000, there were 855 people, 327 households, and 246 families residing in the township. The population density was 57.4 inhabitants per square mile (22.2/km^{2}). There were 581 housing units at an average density of 39.0 per square mile (15.1/km^{2}). The racial makeup of the township was 98.83% White, 0.23% Native American and 0.35% Asian. None of the population is Hispanic or Latino of any race.

There were 327 households, out of which 34.3% had children under the age of 18 living with them, 68.5% were married couples living together, 4.9% had a female householder with no husband present, and 24.5% were non-families. 19.6% of all households were made up of individuals, and 6.4% had someone living alone who was 65 years of age or older. The average household size was 2.61 and the average family size was 2.96.

In the township the population was spread out, with 25.7% under the age of 18, 6.2% from 18 to 24, 27.4% from 25 to 44, 25.6% from 45 to 64, and 15.1% who were 65 years of age or older. The median age was 41 years. For every 100 females, there were 90.8 males. For every 100 females age 18 and over, there were 92.4 males.

The median income for a household in the township was $39,559, and the median income for a family was $45,357. Males had a median income of $34,375 versus $22,222 for females. The per capita income for the township was $17,175. About 5.6% of families and 8.9% of the population were below the poverty line, including 11.0% of those under age 18 and 8.8% of those age 65 or over.
