= Crystal Springs, North Dakota =

- Unincorporated community
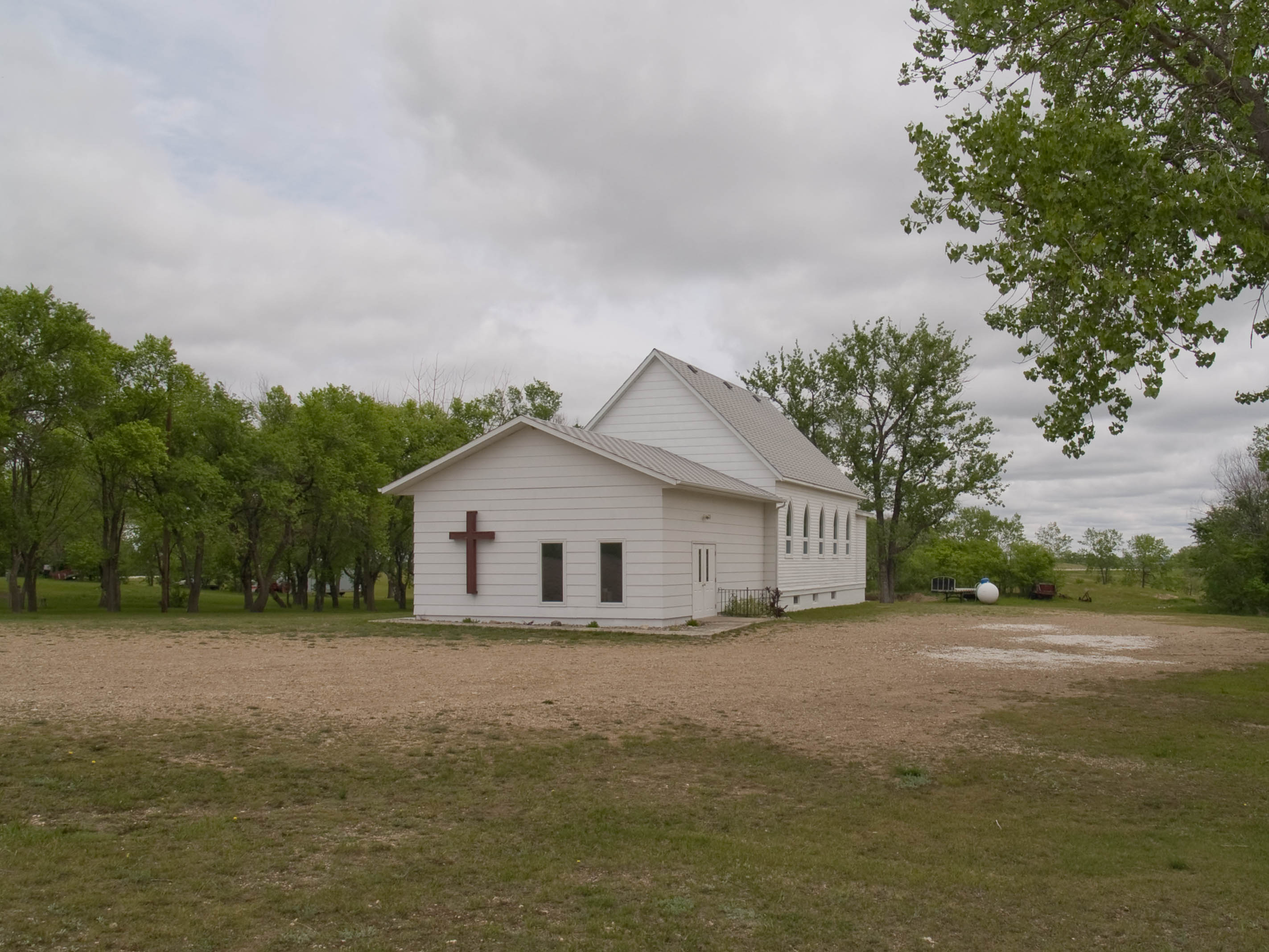
- Church in Crystal Springs

- Location within North Dakota Location within the United States
- Coordinates: 46°52′42″N 99°28′32″W
- Country: United States
- State: North Dakota
- County: Kidder
- Elevation: 1,831 ft (558 m)
- Time zone: UTC-6 (Central (CST))
  - Summer (DST): UTC-5 (CDT)
- Area code: 701
- GNIS feature ID: 1028561

Crystal Springs is an unincorporated community in Kidder County, North Dakota, United States. Crystal Springs is located along Interstate 94, 7.6 miles (12.2 km) east of Tappen.

== History ==
A post office called Crystal Springs was established in 1884, and remained in operation until 1993. The community took its name from nearby Crystal Springs Lakes. The population was 50 in 1940.

== See also ==
- Crystal Springs Fountain: nearby fountain on the National Register of Historic Places
