= Tuttle, North Dakota =

- City
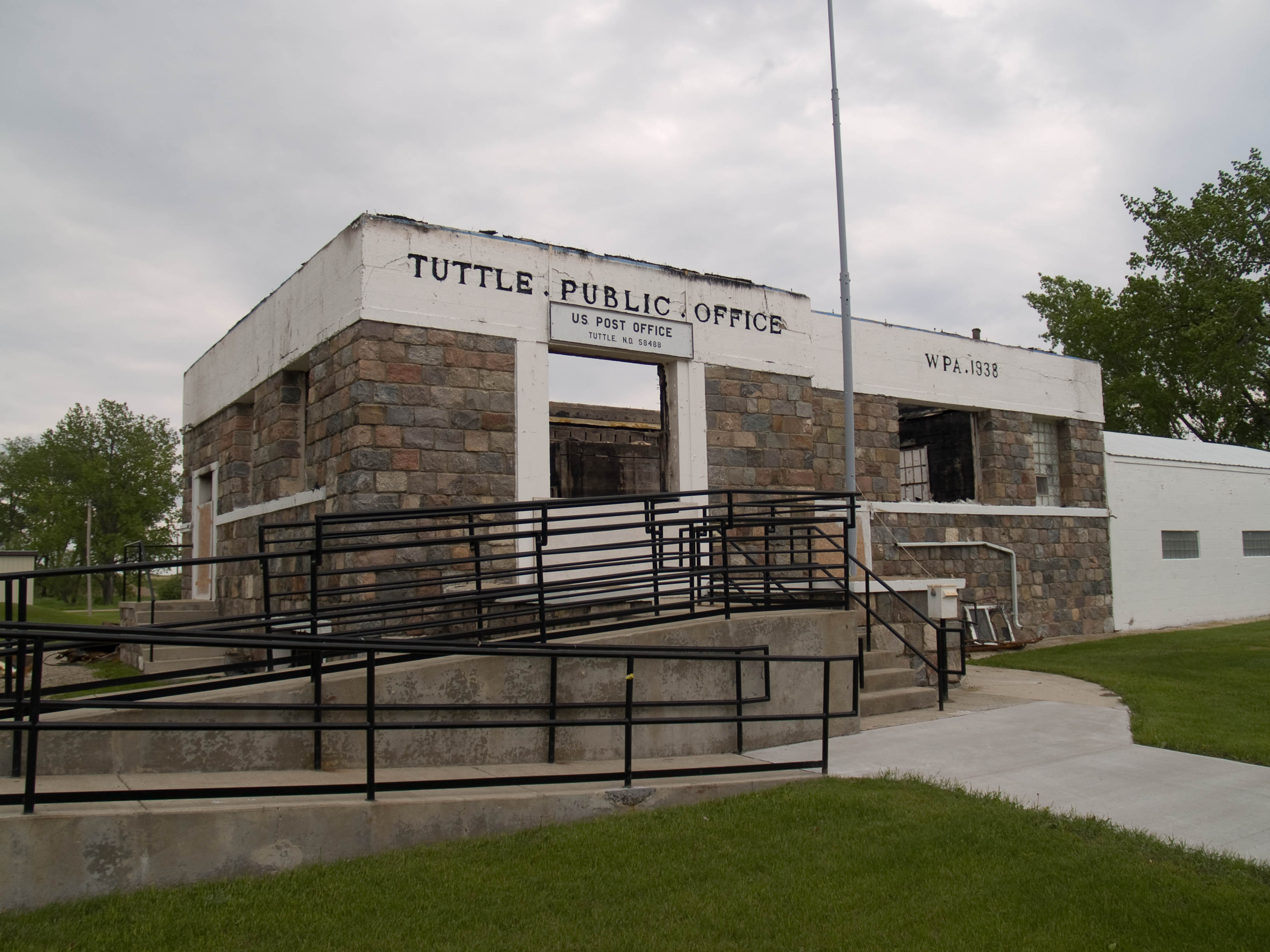
- Tuttle Public Office - Tuttle

- Location of Tuttle, North Dakota
- Coordinates: 47°08′40″N 99°59′36″W
- Country: United States
- State: North Dakota
- County: Kidder

Area
  - Total: 0.25 sq mi (0.64 km^{2})
  - Land: 0.25 sq mi (0.64 km^{2})
  - Water: 0 sq mi (0.00 km^{2})
- Elevation: 1,850 ft (560 m)

Population (2020)
  - Total: 60
  - Density: 241.5/sq mi (93.23/km^{2})
- Time zone: UTC-6 (CST)
  - Summer (DST): UTC-5 (CDT)
- ZIP code: 58488
- Area code: 701
- FIPS code: 38-80140
- GNIS feature ID: 1036302

Tuttle is a city in Kidder County, North Dakota, United States. The population was 60 at the 2020 census. Tuttle was founded in 1911. At the turn of the 19th century and early 20th century, the land surrounding Tuttle was predominantly, although not exclusively, homesteaded by families of German-Russian ethnicity. Many of their descendants still farm and ranch the land around Tuttle.

== Geography ==
According to the United States Census Bureau, the city has a total area of 0.25 square miles (0.65 km^{2}), all land. Because of its location in the Prairie Pothole Region and the Central Flyway, residents enjoy access to outdoor hunting activities. Tuttle has also become a destination for waterfowl hunters.

== History ==
According to the Tuttle 50th anniversary book published in 1961, Tuttle was named for Col. William P. Tuttle, an official in the Dakota Land & Townsite Company which platted the town in 1910. Col. Tuttle reportedly never lived in Tuttle, but was fond of the town and once purchased baseball uniforms for the local team. The Northern Pacific Railway laid a track through Tuttle on October 4, 1911. Service between Tuttle and Pingree to the east started later that month. On January 21, 1917, fire completely destroyed the Miller General Store and several other Tuttle businesses. Citizens responded and were able to save other businesses from the flames. Following this fire, citizens met to organize a volunteer fire department which exists to this day. J.W. Wittmayer was elected the first fire chief of Tuttle.

Many family histories recorded in the anniversary book tell of extreme hardships with the weather which can produce severe cold and blizzards in the winter and blazing heat and strong storms in the summer. On July 3, 1935, at about 9 am, the town experienced a notable weather event. A strong wind came up first and hail started falling and, combined with drenching rain, it caused significant damage to Tuttle and surrounding areas. Reportedly, nearly every window facing north and west was broken in homes and business places. Despite the damage, a July 4 Independence Day celebration occurred as planned. On July 1, 1952, about 7:00 pm, a tornado struck Tuttle in the evening. The clouds in the sky reportedly looked very threatening. As the tornado drew closer to the town, residents reported hearing a sound like "hundreds of freight trains bearing down." The funnel could not be seen in Tuttle as there was so much dust in the air, but people south of the town reported seeing it very clearly. The tornado heavily damaged several homes in Tuttle, but the majority were not touched.

2007 was a particularly difficult year for Tuttle. In this year, the Tuttle School closed. The Danielson Hotel, an abandoned hotel landmark on Tuttle's main street, was demolished. On November 19, 2007, the Tuttle post office building, a historic field stone structure created in 1938 as a WPA project, was significantly damaged after a furnace ignited and fire gutted the building. The resulting smoke plume was visible for many miles. The fire did not destroy the field stone and concrete walls, and the building was restored by 2011.

Like many other small towns on the North American Great Plains that were settled in the early 20th century, nearly a century after its founding Tuttle has experienced the closure of many business which has paralleled a population trend of outmigration of young people to larger cities and a subsequent aging of its population. Today, Tuttle is without a bank, a school and newspaper, but is home to a well stocked co-op grocery store and grain elevator. Although the railroad track that caused Tuttle to be platted was removed around 2004, improved roads and access to Interstate 94 has reduced the isolation of Tuttle. The cities of Bismarck and Jamestown are approximately a one-hour drive from Tuttle, and are therefore accessible to Tuttle residents.

== Demographics ==
Historical population
Census	Pop.	Note	%±
1920	321		—
1930	383		19.3%
1940	357		−6.8%
1950	368		3.1%
1960	255		−30.7%
1970	216		−15.3%
1980	202		−6.5%
1990	160		−20.8%
2000	106		−33.7%
2010	80		−24.5%
2020	60		−25.0%
2021 (est.)	59		−1.7%
U.S. Decennial Census; 2020 Census

=== 2010 census ===
As of the census of 2010, there were 80 people, 43 households, and 20 families residing in the city. The population density was 320.0 inhabitants per square mile (123.6/km^{2}). There were 69 housing units at an average density of 276.0 per square mile (106.6/km^{2}). The racial makeup of the city was 100.0% White.

There were 43 households, of which 7.0% had children under the age of 18 living with them, 37.2% were married couples living together, 4.7% had a female householder with no husband present, 4.7% had a male householder with no wife present, and 53.5% were non-families. 46.5% of all households were made up of individuals, and 23.3% had someone living alone who was 65 years of age or older. The average household size was 1.86 and the average family size was 2.50.

The median age in the city was 59.3 years. 12.5% of residents were under the age of 18; 2.7% were between the ages of 18 and 24; 13.9% were from 25 to 44; 37.6% were from 45 to 64; and 33.8% were 65 years of age or older. The gender makeup of the city was 53.8% male and 46.3% female.

=== 2000 census ===
As of the census of 2000, there were 106 people, 56 households, and 28 families residing in the city. The population density was 429.1 inhabitants per square mile (165.7/km^{2}). There were 79 housing units at an average density of 319.8 per square mile (123.5/km^{2}). The racial makeup of the city was 99.06% White, and 0.94% from two or more races.

There were 56 households, out of which 16.1% had children under the age of 18 living with them, 48.2% were married couples living together, 1.8% had a female householder with no husband present, and 50.0% were non-families. 46.4% of all households were made up of individuals, and 26.8% had someone living alone who was 65 years of age or older. The average household size was 1.89 and the average family size was 2.71.

In the city, the population was spread out, with 15.1% under the age of 18, 4.7% from 18 to 24, 12.3% from 25 to 44, 36.8% from 45 to 64, and 31.1% who were 65 years of age or older. The median age was 53 years. For every 100 females, there were 103.8 males. For every 100 females age 18 and over, there were 95.7 males.

The median income for a household in the city was $25,000, and the median income for a family was $46,875. Males had a median income of $50,625 versus $16,607 for females. The per capita income for the city was $17,970. There were no families and 6.2% of the population living below the poverty line, including no under eighteens and 13.3% of those over 64.

== Climate ==
This climatic region is typified by large seasonal temperature differences, with warm to hot (and often humid) summers and cold (sometimes severely cold) winters. According to the Köppen Climate Classification system, Tuttle has a humid continental climate, abbreviated "Dfb" on climate maps.
