= Mae Krier =

American activist

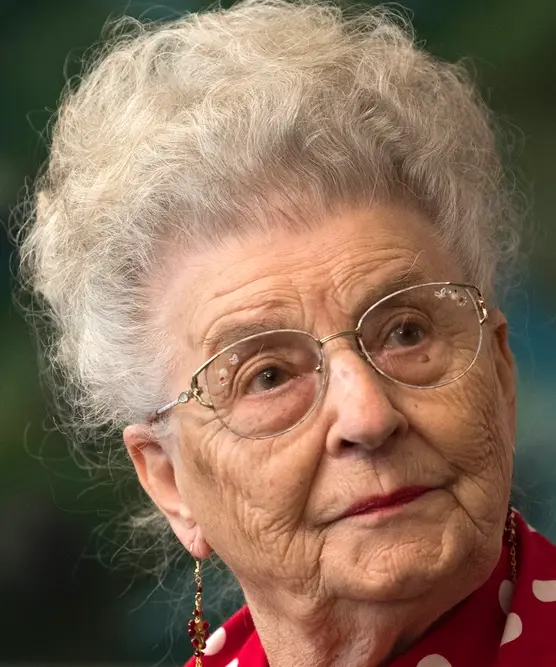
- Krier in 2019
- Born: Anna Mae Burkett; March 21, 1926 (age 100); Dawson, North Dakota
- Occupations: Veteran, activist

Anna Mae Krier (born March 21, 1926) is an American activist. She worked as a riveter during World War 2, becoming part of the group dubbed Rosie the Riveters, before serving in the Army Corps of Engineers. She has since advocated for formal recognition for women serving in World War 2.

== Biography ==
Krier was born on March 21, 1926 in Dawson, North Dakota. At 17, she went to Seattle to work as a riveter at Boeing on Boeing B-17 Flying Fortresses and Boeing B-29 Superfortresses. She signed her name on the 5000th B-17.

She has recounted how she began doing the work for the money, but as she continued to work as a riveter became more and more patriotic. In her free time, she participated in jitterbug dance competitions with a man who later became her husband. She subsequently went to Pasco to work for the Army Corps of Engineers, before leaving service in October 1945 with her husband.

Afterwards, she moved to Levittown, Pennsylvania, where she raised two children. But "as the years went on", the lack of recognition and benefits the women, dubbed Rosie the Riveters, received irritated her more and more. She then began her activism for recognition for the Rosies, sending out handwritten letters to both state and federal elected officials.

Her activism bore fruit, as she was attributed with being the driving force behind the ultimate creation of Rosie the Riveter day.

In 2020, at 94, she sewed hundreds of face masks out of the red polka-dot fabric associated with Rosies, saying "If just one of these little face masks can save one life, I've done my job." One of those masks, as well as a scarf of the same fabric, were sent into space by Boeing on a mannequin called Rosie the Rocketeer. In 2024, she received a Congressional Gold Medal in honor of the Rosies.

In 2026, she celebrated her 100th birthday by attending an equal pay rally. She also fundraised thousands of dollars towards a memorial for the Rosies in Washington, D.C..

She was featured in Women Money Power, the 2024 book. She is the subject of a picture book.
