= Pettibone, North Dakota =

- City
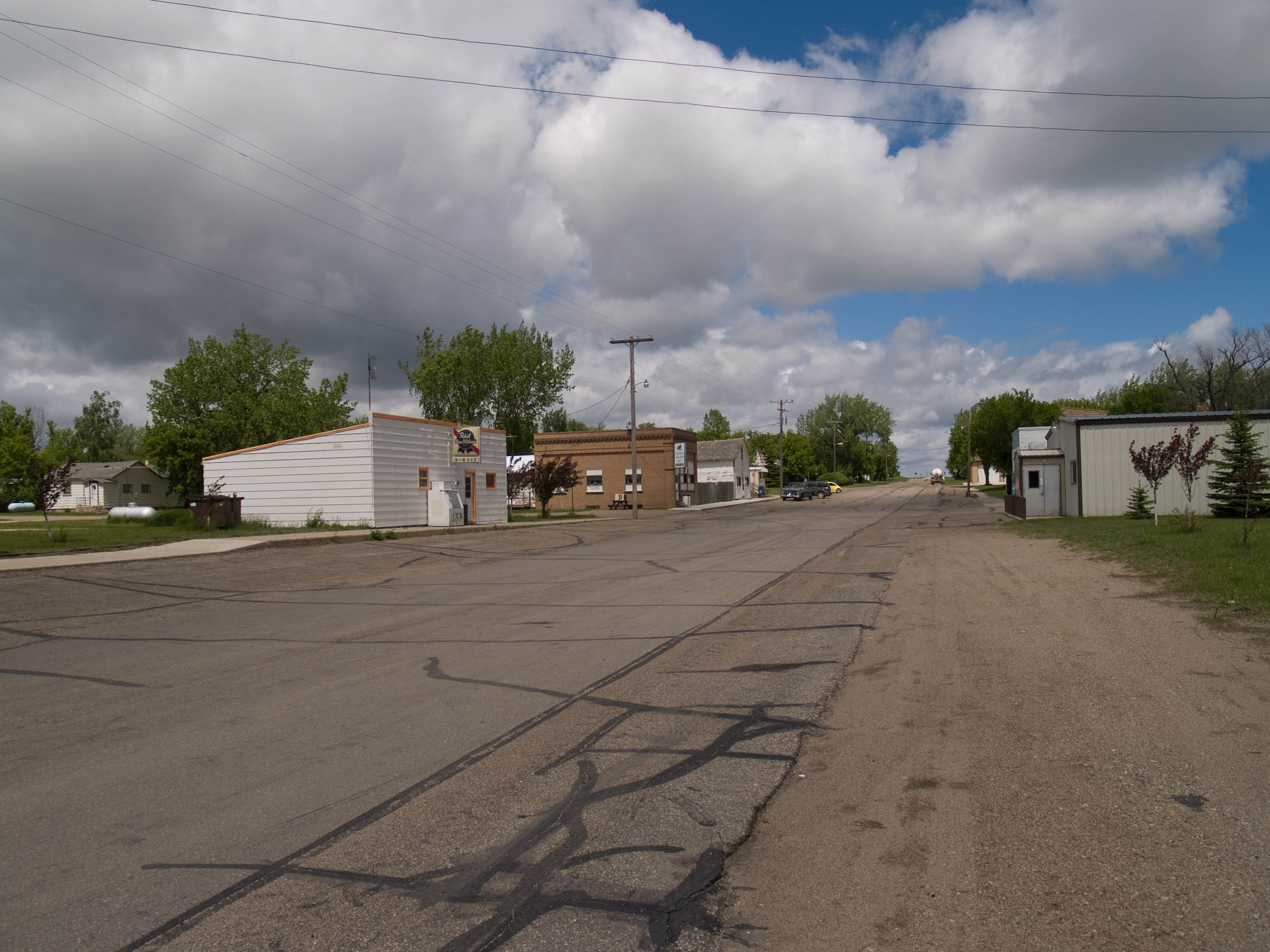
- Street in Pettibone

- Location of Pettibone, North Dakota
- Coordinates: 47.117068°N 99.520816°W
- Country: United States
- State: North Dakota
- County: Kidder
- Founded: 1910
- Founder: Lee C. Pettibone

Area
  - Total: 0.182 sq mi (0.472 km^{2})
  - Land: 0.182 sq mi (0.472 km^{2})
  - Water: 0 sq mi (0.000 km^{2})
- Elevation: 1,841 ft (561 m)

Population (2020)
  - Total: 60
  - Estimate (2024): 57
  - Density: 329.6/sq mi (127.25/km^{2})
- Time zone: UTC–6 (Central (CST))
  - Summer (DST): UTC–5 (CDT)
- ZIP Code: 58475
- Area code: 701
- FIPS code: 38-62060
- GNIS feature ID: 1036219
- Website: pettibone.us

Pettibone is a small city in Kidder County, North Dakota, United States. The population was 60 at the 2020 census, and was estimated to be 57 in 2024,

== History ==
Pettibone was founded in 1910. It was named for founder Lee C. Pettibone.

== Geography ==
According to the United States Census Bureau, the city has a total area of 0.182 square miles (0.47 km^{2}), all land.

== Demographics ==
Historical population
Census	Pop.	Note	%±
1960	205		—
1970	173		−15.6%
1980	127		−26.6%
1990	93		−26.8%
2000	88		−5.4%
2010	70		−20.5%
2020	60		−14.3%
2024 (est.)	57		−5.0%
U.S. Decennial Census; 2020 Census

=== 2010 census ===
As of the 2010 census, there were 70 people, 39 households, and 18 families residing in the city. The population density was 411.8 inhabitants per square mile (159.0/km^{2}). There were 62 housing units at an average density of 364.7 per square mile (140.8/km^{2}). The racial makeup of the city was 98.6% White and 1.4% from two or more races. Hispanic or Latino people of any race were 2.9% of the population.

There were 39 households, of which 12.8% had children under the age of 18 living with them, 41.0% were married couples living together, 5.1% had a female householder with no husband present, and 53.8% were non-families. 48.7% of all households were made up of individuals, and 25.7% had someone living alone who was 65 years of age or older. The average household size was 1.79 and the average family size was 2.61.

The median age in the city was 57 years. 12.9% of residents were under the age of 18; 2.9% were between the ages of 18 and 24; 24.3% were from 25 to 44; 20.1% were from 45 to 64; and 40% were 65 years of age or older. The gender makeup of the city was 50.0% male and 50.0% female.

=== 2000 census ===
As of the 2000 census, there were 88 people, 42 households, and 24 families residing in the city. The population density was 501.8 inhabitants per square mile (193.7/km^{2}). There were 60 housing units at an average density of 342.2 per square mile (132.1/km^{2}). The racial makeup of the city was 100.00% White.

There were 42 households, out of which 23.8% had children under the age of 18 living with them, 47.6% were married couples living together, 9.5% had a female householder with no husband present, and 40.5% were non-families. 35.7% of all households were made up of individuals, and 28.6% had someone living alone who was 65 years of age or older. The average household size was 2.10 and the average family size was 2.76.

In the city, the population was spread out, with 21.6% under the age of 18, 1.1% from 18 to 24, 23.9% from 25 to 44, 28.4% from 45 to 64, and 25.0% who were 65 years of age or older. The median age was 48 years. For every 100 females, there were 100.0 males. For every 100 females age 18 and over, there were 97.1 males.

The median income for a household in the city was $24,167, and the median income for a family was $25,625. Males had a median income of $16,964 versus $11,875 for females. The per capita income for the city was $12,677. There were 8.7% of families and 20.8% of the population living below the poverty line, including 33.3% of under eighteens and 18.5% of those over 64.

== Climate ==
This climatic region is typified by large seasonal temperature differences, with warm to hot (and often humid) summers and cold (sometimes severely cold) winters. According to the Köppen Climate Classification system, Pettibone has a humid continental climate, abbreviated "Dfb" on climate maps.
