= Buchanan Valley Township, Emmons County, North Dakota =

Coordinates: 46°35′27″N 100°21′15″W

Buchanan Valley Township is a former township in Emmons County, North Dakota. Its population as of the 2000 Census was 40. The township was dissolved on March 23, 2009, and added to the census-designated North Emmons Unorganized Territory.
