= McCulley Township, Emmons County, North Dakota =

Coordinates: 46°19′00″N 100°12′41″W

McCulley Township is a former township of Emmons County, North Dakota, United States that was located in public land survey Township 134N, Range 76W. The township disbanded on March 1, 1998, and is now part of the unorganized territories of Northeast Emmons and West Emmons. Its last recorded population before dissolving was 79 during the 1990 Census.
