= Tell Township, Emmons County, North Dakota =

Township in North Dakota, USA

Coordinates: 46°29′00″N 099°58′11″W

Tell Township is a defunct township in Emmons County, North Dakota, United States. Its population as of the 2000 Census was 39. The township was dissolved on March 13, 2007, and added to the census-designated North Emmons Unorganized Territory.
