= Emmons County, North Dakota =

County in North Dakota, United States

- County
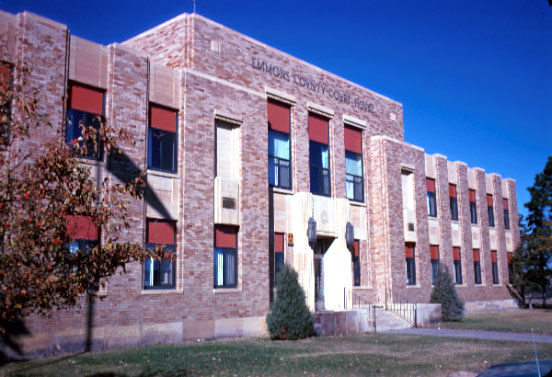
- The Emmons County Courthouse in Linton

- Location within the U.S. state of North Dakota
- Coordinates: 46.284255°N 100.237842°W
- Country: United States
- State: North Dakota
- Founded: February 10, 1879 (created); November 9, 1883 (organized)
- Seat: Linton
- Largest city: Linton

Area
  - Total: 1,555.311 sq mi (4,028.24 km^{2})
  - Land: 1,508.401 sq mi (3,906.74 km^{2})
  - Water: 46.910 sq mi (121.50 km^{2}) 3.02%

Population (2020)
  - Total: 3,301
  - Estimate (2025): 3,215 ▼
  - Density: 2.125/sq mi (0.820/km^{2})
- Time zone: UTC−6 (Central)
  - Summer (DST): UTC−5 (CDT)
- Area code: 701
- Congressional district: At-large
- Website: emmonsnd.com

Emmons County is a county in the U.S. state of North Dakota. As of the 2020 census, the population was 3,301, and was estimated to be 3,215 in 2025. The county seat and the largest city is Linton.

== History ==
The county was created by the Dakota Territory legislature on February 10, 1879, with territories partitioned from Burleigh and Campbell Counties. It was not organized at the time, but it was not attached to another county for administrative and judicial purposes. This continued until November 9, 1883, when the governing structure was organized. The county was named for James A. Emmons (1845–1919), a steamboat operator and early Bismarck merchant and entrepreneur.

The first non-Native settlers of Emmons County came from Europe and the eastern United States. The earliest were mostly soldiers discharged from Fort Yates, but civilians began arriving in the 1880s. Two large ethnic groups soon developed: Germans from both Russia and Germany (the latter called Reich Germans) and Hollanders who had come from the eastern United States. The Hollanders lived only in the southwestern part of the county while the Germans settled throughout the area.

The settlers faced hardships in Emmons County, particularly the adverse climate with its extreme seasonal variations in temperature, wind, rain, and snow. Winter blizzards, summer thunderstorms, and tornadoes were a constant threat. Early settlers built crude dwellings using available materials. The first building in Emmons county was a log cabin built near present-day Winona (1852). Other dwellings used tar paper or local rocks. Rocks were a common sight on the prairie, but stone houses were a rarity because they took great care to build. The most common type of dwelling was the sod house, which later became synonymous with pioneering life on the prairie. Sod is prairie grass and dirt cut into blocks and stacked to form walls. Sod was an effective solution to the problem of limited lumber availability. These crude dwellings were eventually abandoned in favor of more modern homes as soon as the necessary building materials became available.

Another hardship was transportation. There were no roads and the nearest railroad station was in Eureka, South Dakota (40 miles (64 km) away). A horse and wagon were typically used for transportation. Piles of buffalo bones were used as landmarks to aid navigating the vast prairie. Since no bridges existed, creeks and streams presented a major difficulty. Settlers usually traveled in pairs and used both of their teams of horses to pull each wagon across a creek or stream. The first bridge in Emmons County was built in 1889.

The Missouri River forms the county's western boundary. Some settlers earned a living by providing cordwood to the river's steamboats in the summer (river ice halted the boats in wintertime). Ferries moved people and goods across the river, and barges were used to move goods along the river.

The county's first town that still exists was Braddock, established in 1898. A railroad line was laid to Braddock in 1898. Linton was platted in 1899 near the county center, to create a county seat. Linton had 118 residents by 1901, and 245 by 1903. Tirsbol was established in 1902 ten miles (16 km) south of Linton. It became the center of the German immigrant community and was renamed Strasburg. Also in 1902, the town of Hague was established southeast of Strasburg, and Hazelton was platted near Williamsport.

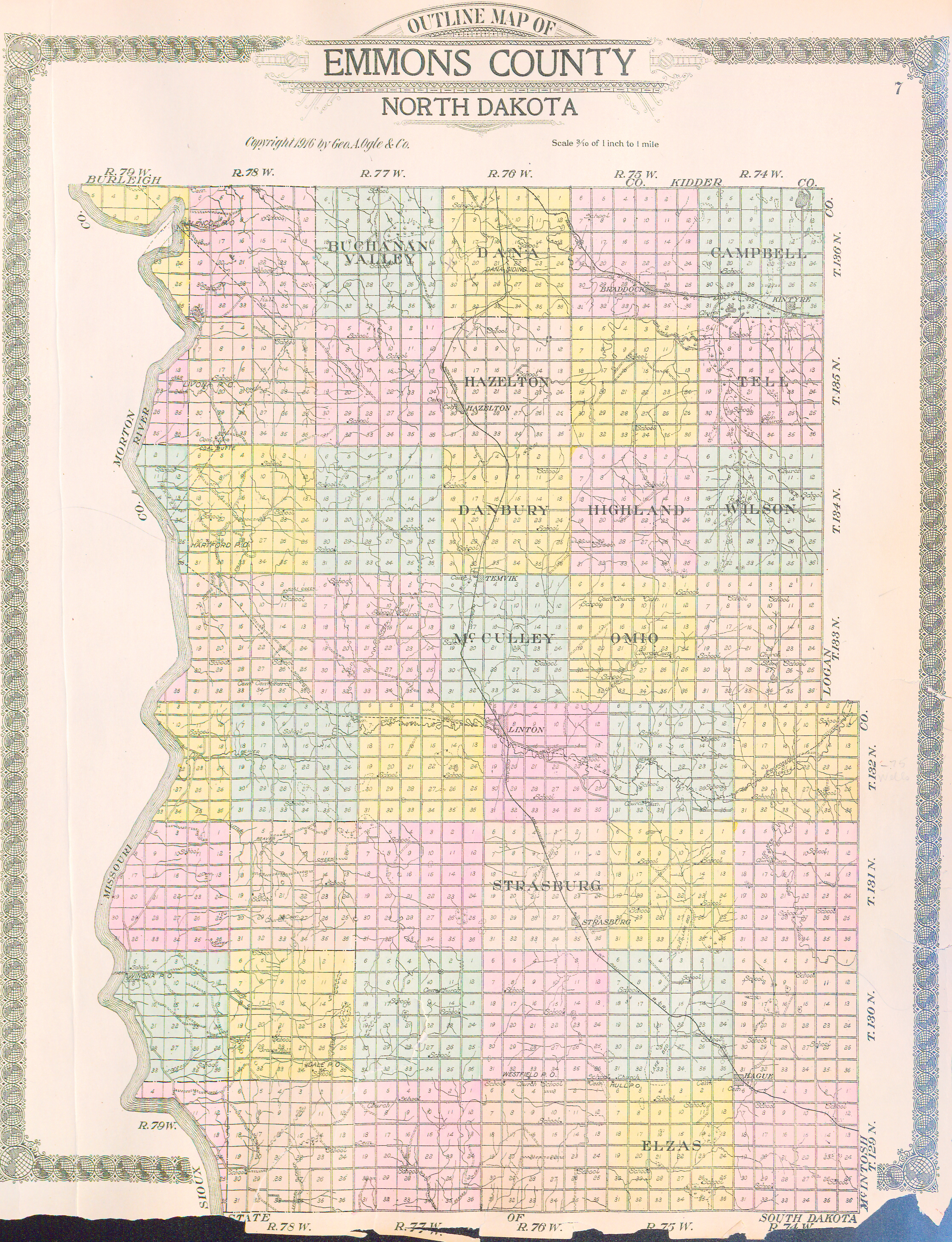
Outline map of Emmons County, North Dakota, 1916

Winona was the first settlement to be created in the county, in 1874, and named 'Devils Colony'. It served soldiers from Fort Yates and the few area settlers. During the 1880s it was the largest town between Bismarck, North Dakota and Pierre, South Dakota. The county's first school was built there in 1884 and the county's first newspaper was published there in 1885. By 1894, the population of the town peaked at over 200. However, the creation of Linton drained the lifeblood from Winona, and it was gone by the early 1900s. The town of Williamsport was established in 1883 by a group of people from Ashland, Ohio and was the first county seat of government. The creation of Linton and Hazelton drained the population from Williamsport and it was abandoned in 1903.

Other towns no longer in existence include Emmonsburg which was located west of Linton, in Beaver Bay, on the Missouri River. It was established in 1888 and abandoned in 1912. Glencoe was also established in 1883 in the northwest corner of the county, but it was abandoned in 1930. Winchester was established in 1884 along Beaver Creek (west of Linton), but was completely abandoned by 1909. Westfield was established in 1888 in the center of the Dutch colony. It was named for Westfield, Iowa but was never incorporated. Godkin was established in 1902, six miles (9.7 km) north of Linton. Its name was later changed to Temvik, combining the last names of early settlers - the Tempel brothers and Ed Larvik. By 1925 its population peaked to over 200, but the effects of the 1930s Great Depression and being bypassed by the construction of U.S. Highway 83 led to its downfall. Its post office was abandoned in 1968. The final town of note is Kintyre. Settled by Swedes and Norwegians in the 1880s; it was established in 1908 and subsequently abandoned.

== Geography ==
Emmons County lies on the south line of North Dakota. Its south boundary line abuts the north boundary line of the state of South Dakota. The Missouri River flows south-southeasterly along the county's western boundary. The county terrain consists of low rolling hills, mostly devoted to agriculture. Its terrain slopes to the south and east, although its western area slopes westward to the river valley.

According to the United States Census Bureau, the county has a total area of 1,555.311 square miles (4,028.24 km^{2}), of which 1,508.401 square miles (3,906.74 km^{2}) is land and 46.910 square miles (121.50 km^{2}) (3.02%) is water. It is the 14th largest county in North Dakota by total area.

=== Major highways ===
- US 83
- ND 11
- ND 13
- ND 34
- ND 1804

=== Adjacent counties ===
- Burleigh County - north
- Kidder County - northeast
- Logan County - east
- McIntosh County - southeast
- Campbell County, South Dakota - south
- Corson County, South Dakota - southwest
- Sioux County - west
- Morton County - northwest

=== Protected areas ===
- Appert Lake National Wildlife Refuge
- Beaver Creek Recreation Area
- Flickertail National Wildlife Management Area
- North Dakota Fisheries Management Area
- Springwater National Wildlife Refuge
- Sunburst Lake National Wildlife Refuge

=== Lakes ===
- Appert Lake
- Braddock Dam
- Goose Lake
- Lake Oahe (part)
- Neuwama Lake
- Rice Lake
- Stink Lake
- Sunburst Lake
- Schwahn Lake

== Demographics ==
Historical population
| Census | Pop. | Note | %± |
|---|---|---|---|
| 1880 | 38 | | — |
| 1890 | 1,971 | | 5,086.8% |
| 1900 | 4,349 | | 120.6% |
| 1910 | 9,796 | | 125.2% |
| 1920 | 11,288 | | 15.2% |
| 1930 | 12,467 | | 10.4% |
| 1940 | 11,699 | | −6.2% |
| 1950 | 9,715 | | −17.0% |
| 1960 | 8,462 | | −12.9% |
| 1970 | 7,200 | | −14.9% |
| 1980 | 5,877 | | −18.4% |
| 1990 | 4,830 | | −17.8% |
| 2000 | 4,331 | | −10.3% |
| 2010 | 3,550 | | −18.0% |
| 2020 | 3,301 | | −7.0% |
| 2025 (est.) | 3,215 | ▼ | −2.6% |
U.S. Decennial Census; 1790–1960 1900–1990; 1990–2000 2010–2020

As of the fourth quarter of 2024, the median home value in Emmons County was $119,094.

As of the 2023 American Community Survey, there are 1,516 estimated households in Emmons County with an average of 2.11 persons per household. The county has a median household income of $67,368. Approximately 13.7% of the county's population lives at or below the poverty line. Emmons County has an estimated 57.0% employment rate, with 20.7% of the population holding a bachelor's degree or higher and 88.9% holding a high school diploma.

The top five reported ancestries (people were allowed to report up to two ancestries, thus the figures will generally add to more than 100%) were English (92.7%), Spanish (0.6%), Indo-European (6.1%), Asian and Pacific Islander (0.4%), and Other (0.2%).

The median age in the county was 51.5 years.

Emmons County, North Dakota – racial and ethnic composition
Note: the US Census treats Hispanic/Latino as an ethnic category. This table excludes Latinos from the racial categories and assigns them to a separate category. Hispanics/Latinos may be of any race.

| Race / ethnicity (NH = non-Hispanic) | Pop. 1980 | Pop. 1990 | Pop. 2000 | Pop. 2010 | Pop. 2020 |
|---|---|---|---|---|---|
| White alone (NH) | 5,850 (99.54%) | 4,814 (99.67%) | 4,257 (98.29%) | 3,468 (97.69%) | 3,162 (95.79%) |
| Black or African American alone (NH) | 1 (0.02%) | 0 (0.00%) | 2 (0.05%) | 2 (0.06%) | 0 (0.00%) |
| Native American or Alaska Native alone (NH) | 6 (0.10%) | 5 (0.10%) | 4 (0.09%) | 14 (0.39%) | 13 (0.39%) |
| Asian alone (NH) | 1 (0.02%) | 4 (0.08%) | 7 (0.16%) | 6 (0.17%) | 12 (0.36%) |
| Pacific Islander alone (NH) | — | — | 7 (0.16%) | 0 (0.00%) | 0 (0.00%) |
| Other race alone (NH) | 1 (0.02%) | 0 (0.00%) | 0 (0.00%) | 0 (0.00%) | 8 (0.24%) |
| Mixed race or multiracial (NH) | — | — | 4 (0.09%) | 26 (0.73%) | 71 (2.15%) |
| Hispanic or Latino (any race) | 18 (0.31%) | 7 (0.14%) | 50 (1.15%) | 34 (0.96%) | 35 (1.06%) |
| Total | 5,877 (100.00%) | 4,830 (100.00%) | 4,331 (100.00%) | 3,550 (100.00%) | 3,301 (100.00%) |

=== 2024 estimate ===
As of the 2024 estimate, there were 3,209 people and 1,516 households residing in the county. There were 2,123 housing units at an average density of 1.41 per square mile (0.5/km^{2}). The racial makeup of the county was 95.5% White (93.8% NH White), 0.6% African American, 1.2% Native American, 0.9% Asian, 0.0% Pacific Islander, _% from some other races and 1.8% from two or more races. Hispanic or Latino people of any race were 1.8% of the population.

=== 2020 census ===
As of the 2020 census, there were 3,301 people, 1,492 households, and 859 families residing in the county. The population density was 2.19 inhabitants per square mile (0.8/km^{2}). There were 2,047 housing units at an average density of 1.36 per square mile (0.5/km^{2}). Of the residents, 20.8% were under the age of 18 and 28.5% were 65 years of age or older; the median age was 51.7 years. For every 100 females there were 104.4 males, and for every 100 females age 18 and over there were 106.9 males.

The racial makeup of the county was 96.3% White, 0.0% Black or African American, 0.4% American Indian and Alaska Native, 0.4% Asian, 0.3% from some other race, and 2.6% from two or more races. Hispanic or Latino residents of any race comprised 1.1% of the population.

There were 1,492 households in the county, of which 21.6% had children under the age of 18 living with them and 20.2% had a female householder with no spouse or partner present. About 38.3% of all households were made up of individuals and 21.7% had someone living alone who was 65 years of age or older.

There were 2,047 housing units, of which 27.1% were vacant. Among occupied housing units, 82.9% were owner-occupied and 17.1% were renter-occupied. The homeowner vacancy rate was 2.1% and the rental vacancy rate was 12.9%.

=== 2010 census ===
As of the 2010 census, there were 3,550 people, 1,594 households, and 1,003 families residing in the county. The population density was 2.35 inhabitants per square mile (0.9/km^{2}). There were 2,085 housing units at an average density of 1.38 per square mile (0.5/km^{2}). The racial makeup of the county was 98.45% White, 0.06% African American, 0.39% Native American, 0.17% Asian, 0.00% Pacific Islander, 0.17% from some other races and 0.76% from two or more races. Hispanic or Latino people of any race were 0.96% of the population.

In terms of ancestry, 69.1% were German, 16.8% were Russian, 12.3% were Norwegian, 9.6% were Dutch, 5.9% were English, and 1.4% were American.

There were 1,594 households, 22.6% had children under the age of 18 living with them, 55.4% were married couples living together, 3.8% had a female householder with no husband present, 37.1% were non-families, and 34.4% of all households were made up of individuals. The average household size was 2.19 and the average family size was 2.81. The median age was 50.5 years.

The median income for a household in the county was $35,615 and the median income for a family was $45,464. Males had a median income of $31,468 versus $26,700 for females. The per capita income for the county was $21,358. About 12.4% of families and 16.1% of the population were below the poverty line, including 22.0% of those under age 18 and 20.4% of those age 65 or over.

== Communities ==
=== Cities ===
- Braddock
- Hague
- Hazelton
- Linton (county seat)
- Strasburg

=== Unincorporated communities ===
- Emmonsburg
- Glencoe
- Kintyre
- Livona
- Temvik
- Westfield
- Williamsport
- Winchester
- Winona

=== Township ===
- Campbell

=== Defunct townships ===
- Buchanan Valley
- Hazelton
- Lincoln
- McCulley
- Tell

== Politics ==
Emmons County voters have been reliably Republican for decades. In only one national election since 1960 has the county selected the Democratic Party candidate (as of 2024).

United States presidential election results for Emmons County, North Dakota
| Year | Republican | | Democratic | | Third party(ies) | |
| Year | No. | % | No. | % | No. | % |
|---|---|---|---|---|---|---|
| 1900 | 433 | 57.97% | 311 | 41.63% | 3 | 0.40% |
| 1904 | 653 | 68.66% | 281 | 29.55% | 17 | 1.79% |
| 1908 | 951 | 59.70% | 618 | 38.79% | 24 | 1.51% |
| 1912 | 410 | 30.44% | 524 | 38.90% | 413 | 30.66% |
| 1916 | 1,090 | 63.15% | 609 | 35.28% | 27 | 1.56% |
| 1920 | 2,900 | 91.77% | 238 | 7.53% | 22 | 0.70% |
| 1924 | 1,198 | 39.66% | 123 | 4.07% | 1,700 | 56.27% |
| 1928 | 1,792 | 46.25% | 2,066 | 53.32% | 17 | 0.44% |
| 1932 | 916 | 22.62% | 3,089 | 76.29% | 44 | 1.09% |
| 1936 | 1,117 | 26.70% | 2,424 | 57.95% | 642 | 15.35% |
| 1940 | 3,515 | 77.29% | 1,004 | 22.08% | 29 | 0.64% |
| 1944 | 2,255 | 76.99% | 656 | 22.40% | 18 | 0.61% |
| 1948 | 2,223 | 63.46% | 1,187 | 33.89% | 93 | 2.65% |
| 1952 | 3,369 | 86.16% | 522 | 13.35% | 19 | 0.49% |
| 1956 | 2,789 | 77.11% | 825 | 22.81% | 3 | 0.08% |
| 1960 | 1,785 | 46.42% | 2,058 | 53.52% | 2 | 0.05% |
| 1964 | 1,759 | 53.06% | 1,556 | 46.94% | 0 | 0.00% |
| 1968 | 1,991 | 65.04% | 756 | 24.70% | 314 | 10.26% |
| 1972 | 2,194 | 64.53% | 1,115 | 32.79% | 91 | 2.68% |
| 1976 | 1,370 | 45.91% | 1,459 | 48.89% | 155 | 5.19% |
| 1980 | 2,369 | 77.57% | 502 | 16.44% | 183 | 5.99% |
| 1984 | 1,885 | 73.46% | 620 | 24.16% | 61 | 2.38% |
| 1988 | 1,634 | 62.94% | 925 | 35.63% | 37 | 1.43% |
| 1992 | 1,047 | 43.09% | 595 | 24.49% | 788 | 32.43% |
| 1996 | 1,148 | 53.54% | 544 | 25.37% | 452 | 21.08% |
| 2000 | 1,430 | 71.79% | 405 | 20.33% | 157 | 7.88% |
| 2004 | 1,449 | 68.58% | 611 | 28.92% | 53 | 2.51% |
| 2008 | 1,230 | 66.96% | 546 | 29.72% | 61 | 3.32% |
| 2012 | 1,435 | 76.17% | 383 | 20.33% | 66 | 3.50% |
| 2016 | 1,677 | 84.65% | 215 | 10.85% | 89 | 4.49% |
| 2020 | 1,738 | 86.51% | 237 | 11.80% | 34 | 1.69% |
| 2024 | 1,697 | 87.93% | 205 | 10.62% | 28 | 1.45% |

== Education ==
School districts include:

- Bakker Public School District 10
- Strasburg Public School District 15
- Linton Public School District 36
- Kidder County School District 1
- Hazelton-Moffit-Braddock Public School District 6
- Napoleon Public School District 2
- Zeeland Public School District 4

== See also ==
- National Register of Historic Places listings in Emmons County, North Dakota
