= Kidder County, North Dakota =

County in North Dakota, United States

- County
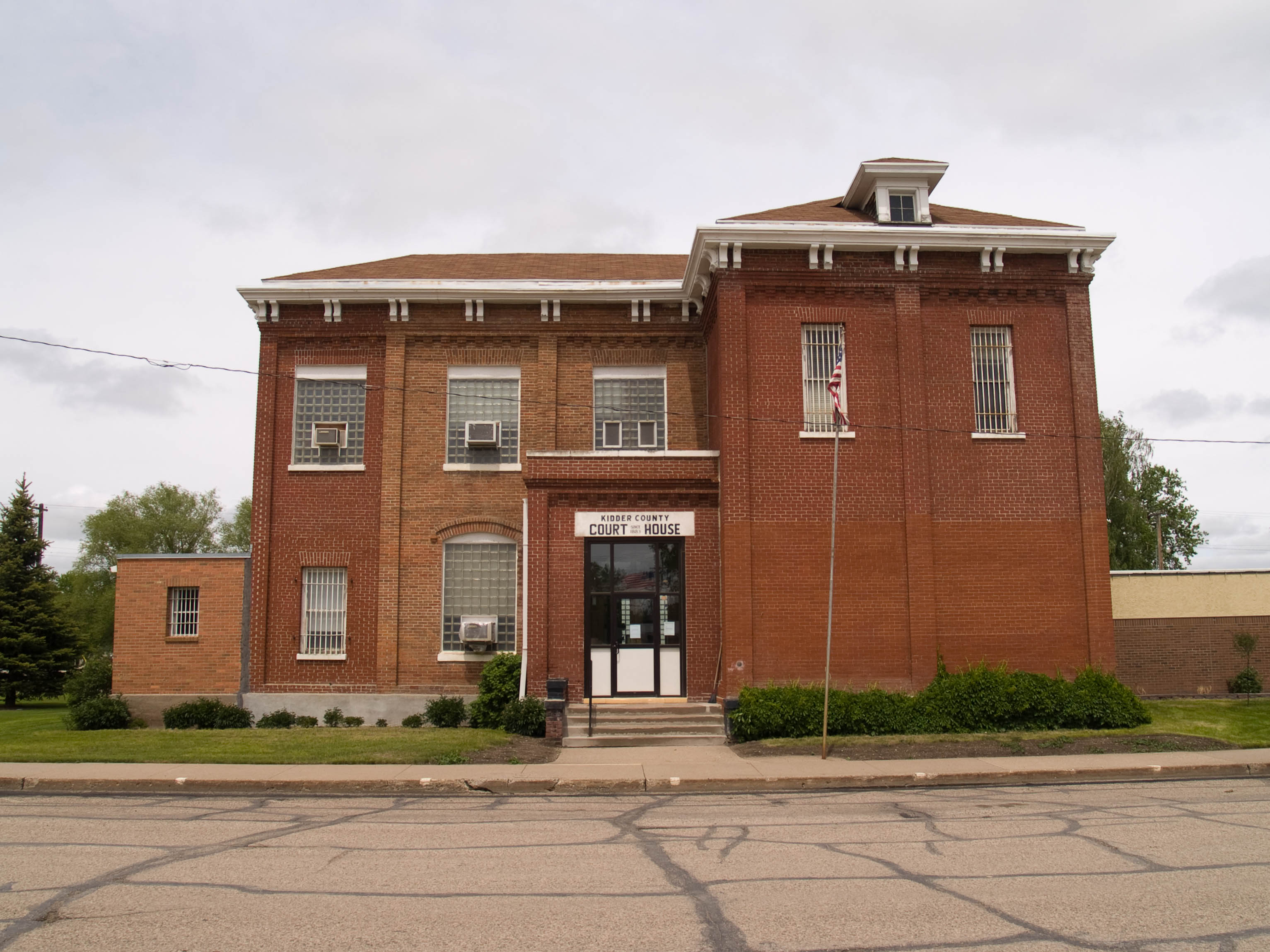
- The Kidder County Courthouse in Steele

- Location within the U.S. state of North Dakota
- Coordinates: 46.938273°N 99.731198°W
- Country: United States
- State: North Dakota
- Founded: January 4, 1873 (created); March 22, 1881 (organized)
- Named for: Jefferson Kidder
- Seat: Steele
- Largest city: Steele

Area
  - Total: 1,432.814 sq mi (3,710.97 km^{2})
  - Land: 1,351.062 sq mi (3,499.23 km^{2})
  - Water: 81.752 sq mi (211.74 km^{2}) 5.71%

Population (2020)
  - Total: 2,394
  - Estimate (2025): 2,393 ▼
  - Density: 1.755/sq mi (0.678/km^{2})
- Time zone: UTC−6 (Central)
  - Summer (DST): UTC−5 (CDT)
- Area code: 701
- Congressional district: At-large

Kidder County is a county located in the U.S. state of North Dakota. As of the 2020 census, the population was 2,394, and was estimated to be 2,393 in 2025. The county seat and largest city is Steele.

== History ==
The Dakota Territory legislature created the county on January 4, 1873, with areas partitioned from Buffalo County. The county government was not organized at that time, nor was the area attached to another county for administrative or judicial purposes. It was named for Jefferson Parrish Kidder, a delegate to the United States Congress from Dakota Territory (1875–1879) and associate justice of the territorial supreme court (1865–1875, 1879–1883). The county government was affected on March 22, 1881.

The county boundaries were altered on 1879 with territory partitioned to Burleigh, and in 1885 with territory partitioned from Burleigh County. Its boundaries have remained unchanged since 1885.

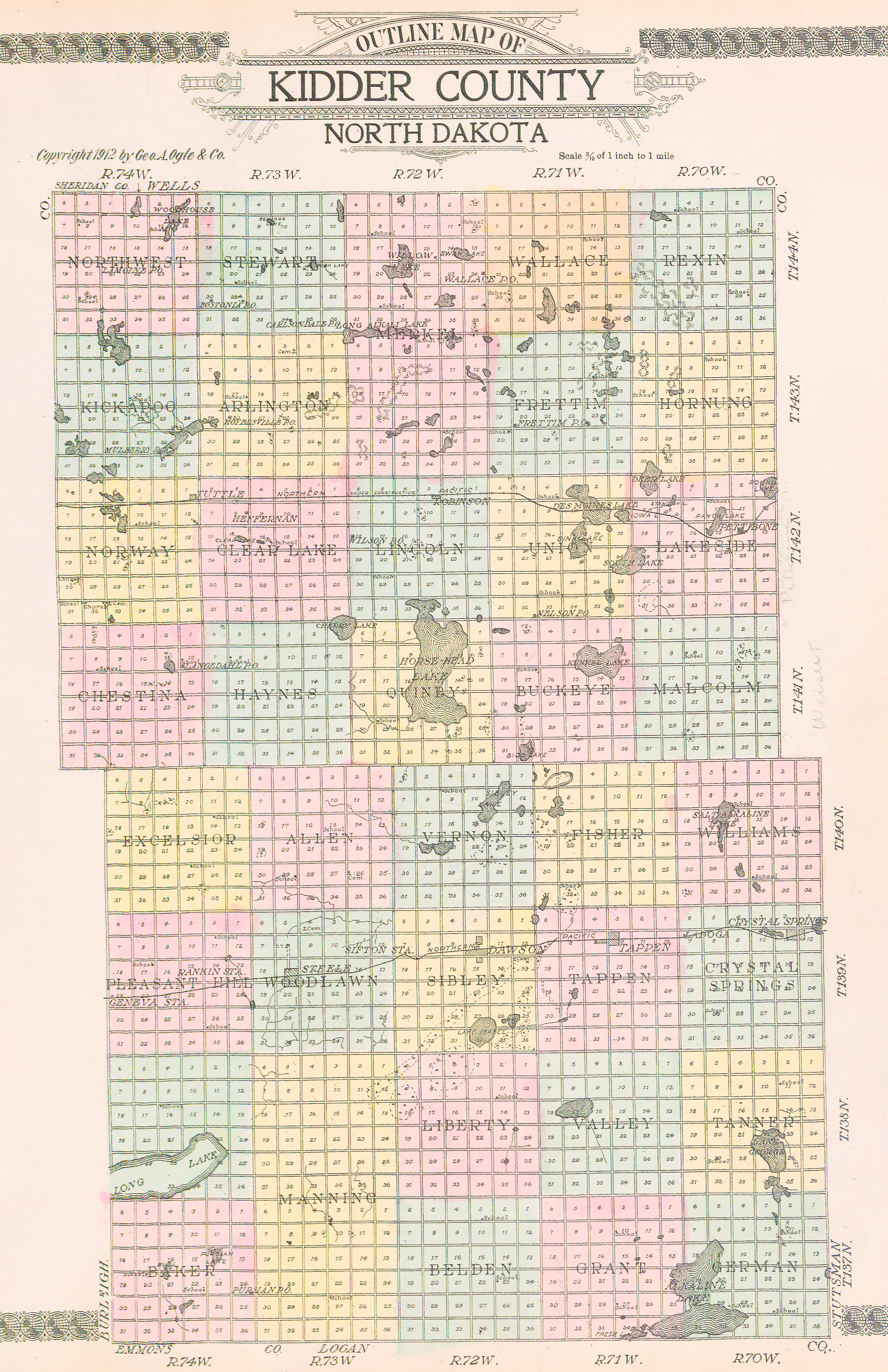
Outline map of Kidder County, North Dakota, 1912

== Geography ==
The terrain of Kidder County consists of hills dotted with lakes and ponds, largely devoted to agriculture. The terrain slopes to the east and south; its highest point is a hill near its northwestern corner, at 2,064 ft (629 m) ASL.

According to the United States Census Bureau, the county has a total area of 1,432.814 square miles (3,710.97 km^{2}), of which 1,351.062 square miles (3,499.23 km^{2}) is land and 81.752 square miles (211.74 km^{2}) (5.71%) is water. It is the 20th largest county in North Dakota by total area.

=== Major highways ===
- I-94
- ND 3
- ND 36

=== Lakes ===
- Alkali Lake
- Alkaline Lake
- Ashley Lake
- Big Muddy Lake
- Bird Lake
- Buffalo Lake
- Cherry Lake
- Crystal Springs Lake
- Dead Buffalo Lake
- Deer Lake
- Fresh Lake
- Geneva Lake
- Harker Lake
- Horsehead Lake
- Kunkel Lake
- Lake Etta
- Lake George
- Lake Helen
- Lake Henry
- Lake Isabel
- Long Alkaline Lake
- Long Lake (partial)
- McPhall Slough
- Mud Lake
- Pursian Lake
- Round Lake
- Salt Alkaline Lake
- Sibley Lake
- Swan Lake
- Upper Harker Lake
- Willow Lake
- Woodhouse Lake

=== Adjacent counties ===
- Wells County - north
- Stutsman County - east
- Logan County - south
- Emmons County - southwest
- Burleigh County - west
- Sheridan County -northwest

=== Protected areas ===
- Alkaline Lake State Wildlife Management Area
- Dawson State Game Management Area
- Hutchinson Lake National Wildlife Refuge
- Lake George National Wildlife Refuge
- Lake Williams State Game Management Area
- Long Lake National Wildlife Refuge (part)
- Slade National Wildlife Refuge
- Streeter Memorial State Park

== Demographics ==
Historical population
Census	Pop.	Note	%±
1880	89		—
1890	1,211		1,260.7%
1900	1,754		44.8%
1910	5,962		239.9%
1920	7,798		30.8%
1930	8,031		3.0%
1940	6,692		−16.7%
1950	6,168		−7.8%
1960	5,386		−12.7%
1970	4,362		−19.0%
1980	3,833		−12.1%
1990	3,332		−13.1%
2000	2,753		−17.4%
2010	2,435		−11.6%
2020	2,394		−1.7%
2025 (est.)	2,393	▼	0.0%
U.S. Decennial Census; 1790–1960 1900–1990; 1990–2000 2010–2020

As of the fourth quarter of 2024, the median home value in Kidder County was $146,748.

As of the 2023 American Community Survey, there are 1,129 estimated households in Kidder County with an average of 2.10 persons per household. The county has a median household income of $61,850. Approximately 14.2% of the county's population lives at or below the poverty line. Kidder County has an estimated 55.0% employment rate, with 21.3% of the population holding a bachelor's degree or higher and 91.8% holding a high school diploma.

The top five reported ancestries (people were allowed to report up to two ancestries, thus the figures will generally add to more than 100%) were English (97.2%), Spanish (1.3%), Indo-European (1.4%), Asian and Pacific Islander (0.0%), and Other (0.1%).

The median age in the county was 47.8 years.

Kidder County, North Dakota – racial and ethnic composition
Note: the US Census treats Hispanic/Latino as an ethnic category. This table excludes Latinos from the racial categories and assigns them to a separate category. Hispanics/Latinos may be of any race.

Race / ethnicity (NH = non-Hispanic)	Pop. 1980	Pop. 1990	Pop. 2000	Pop. 2010	Pop. 2020
White alone (NH)	3,821 (99.69%)	3,321 (99.67%)	2,723 (98.91%)	2,329 (95.65%)	2,271 (94.86%)
Black or African American alone (NH)	0 (0.00%)	0 (0.00%)	5 (0.18%)	6 (0.25%)	3 (0.13%)
Native American or Alaska Native alone (NH)	2 (0.05%)	0 (0.00%)	3 (0.11%)	3 (0.12%)	11 (0.46%)
Asian alone (NH)	3 (0.08%)	4 (0.12%)	2 (0.07%)	22 (0.90%)	1 (0.04%)
Pacific Islander alone (NH)	—	—	0 (0.00%)	0 (0.00%)	5 (0.21%)
Other race alone (NH)	1 (0.03%)	0 (0.00%)	0 (0.00%)	0 (0.00%)	0 (0.00%)
Mixed race or multiracial (NH)	—	—	4 (0.15%)	4 (0.16%)	51 (2.13%)
Hispanic or Latino (any race)	6 (0.16%)	7 (0.21%)	16 (0.58%)	71 (2.92%)	52 (2.17%)
Total	3,833 (100.00%)	3,332 (100.00%)	2,753 (100.00%)	2,435 (100.00%)	2,394 (100.00%)

=== 2024 estimate ===
As of the 2024 estimate, there were 2,371 people and 1,129 households residing in the county. There were 1,636 housing units at an average density of 1.21 per square mile (0.5/km^{2}). The racial makeup of the county was 95.9% White (94.1% NH White), 0.5% African American, 1.6% Native American, 0.8% Asian, 0.0% Pacific Islander, _% from some other races and 1.2% from two or more races. Hispanic or Latino people of any race were 2.6% of the population.

=== 2020 census ===
As of the 2020 census, there were 2,394 people, 1,043 households, and 652 families residing in the county. The population density was 1.77 inhabitants per square mile (0.7/km^{2}). There were 1,631 housing units at an average density of 1.21 per square mile (0.5/km^{2}).

Of the residents, 21.6% were under the age of 18 and 25.0% were 65 years of age or older; the median age was 47.2 years. For every 100 females there were 113.8 males, and for every 100 females age 18 and over there were 113.5 males.

The racial makeup of the county was 95.2% White, 0.1% Black or African American, 0.5% American Indian and Alaska Native, 0.1% Asian, 1.2% from some other race, and 2.7% from two or more races. Hispanic or Latino residents of any race comprised 2.2% of the population.

There were 1,043 households, of which 23.9% had children under the age of 18 living with them and 16.3% had a female householder with no spouse or partner present. About 32.7% of all households were made up of individuals and 15.0% had someone living alone who was 65 years of age or older.

There were 1,631 housing units, of which 36.1% were vacant. Among occupied housing units, 80.6% were owner-occupied and 19.4% were renter-occupied. The homeowner vacancy rate was 2.1% and the rental vacancy rate was 15.6%.

=== 2010 census ===
As of the 2010 census, there were 2,435 people, 1,059 households, and 722 families residing in the county. The population density was 1.80 inhabitants per square mile (0.7/km^{2}). There were 1,674 housing units at an average density of 1.24 per square mile (0.5/km^{2}). The racial makeup of the county was 96.26% White, 0.25% African American, 0.25% Native American, 0.90% Asian, 0.00% Pacific Islander, 1.93% from some other races and 0.41% from two or more races. Hispanic or Latino people of any race were 2.92% of the population.

In terms of ancestry, 65.8% were German, 21.8% were Norwegian, 8.2% were Russian, 6.0% were English, and 1.7% were American.

There were 1,059 households, 24.3% had children under the age of 18 living with them, 58.3% were married couples living together, 5.0% had a female householder with no husband present, 31.8% were non-families, and 28.1% of all households were made up of individuals. The average household size was 2.30 and the average family size was 2.77. The median age was 47.2 years.

The median income for a household in the county was $34,250 and the median income for a family was $47,981. Males had a median income of $35,380 versus $24,330 for females. The per capita income for the county was $23,502. About 15.1% of families and 17.9% of the population were below the poverty line, including 29.1% of those under age 18 and 23.1% of those age 65 or over.

== Communities ==
=== Cities ===
- Dawson
- Pettibone
- Robinson
- Steele (county seat)
- Tappen
- Tuttle

=== Unincorporated communities ===
- Crystal Springs
- Lake Williams

=== Townships ===
- Allen
- Atwood
- Baker
- Buckeye
- Bunker
- Chestina
- Clear Lake
- Crown Hill
- Crystal Springs
- Excelsior
- Frettim
- Graf
- Haynes
- Lake Williams
- North & South Manning
- North & South Merkel
- Northwest
- Peace
- Petersville
- Pettibone
- Pleasant Hill
- Quinby
- Rexine
- Robinson
- Sibley
- Stewart
- Tanner
- Tappen
- Tuttle
- Valley
- Vernon
- Wallace
- Weiser
- Westford
- Williams
- Woodlawn

=== Unorganized territories ===
- Kickapoo
- Liberty

== Politics ==
Kidder County voters have traditionally voted Republican. In no national election since 1936 has the county selected the Democratic Party candidate (as of 2024).

United States presidential election results for Kidder County, North Dakota
Year	Republican		Democratic		Third party(ies)	
Year	No.	%	No.	%	No.	%
1900	225	74.01%	70	23.03%	9	2.96%
1904	447	87.13%	53	10.33%	13	2.53%
1908	769	72.55%	242	22.83%	49	4.62%
1912	322	38.61%	218	26.14%	294	35.25%
1916	604	42.81%	650	46.07%	157	11.13%
1920	1,855	80.69%	336	14.62%	108	4.70%
1924	844	39.42%	110	5.14%	1,187	55.44%
1928	1,200	49.94%	1,190	49.52%	13	0.54%
1932	709	25.39%	2,042	73.14%	41	1.47%
1936	872	29.74%	1,492	50.89%	568	19.37%
1940	2,214	72.31%	837	27.34%	11	0.36%
1944	1,397	66.43%	693	32.95%	13	0.62%
1948	1,510	63.71%	773	32.62%	87	3.67%
1952	2,195	81.93%	468	17.47%	16	0.60%
1956	1,523	68.08%	708	31.65%	6	0.27%
1960	1,574	64.43%	868	35.53%	1	0.04%
1964	1,104	51.32%	1,047	48.68%	0	0.00%
1968	1,204	61.84%	548	28.15%	195	10.02%
1972	1,315	67.06%	557	28.40%	89	4.54%
1976	954	47.16%	936	46.27%	133	6.57%
1980	1,474	77.05%	326	17.04%	113	5.91%
1984	1,240	68.62%	506	28.00%	61	3.38%
1988	1,039	59.00%	678	38.50%	44	2.50%
1992	739	43.19%	468	27.35%	504	29.46%
1996	691	50.00%	434	31.40%	257	18.60%
2000	837	65.60%	283	22.18%	156	12.23%
2004	902	65.89%	433	31.63%	34	2.48%
2008	752	61.24%	422	34.36%	54	4.40%
2012	870	65.51%	393	29.59%	65	4.89%
2016	1,111	80.74%	179	13.01%	86	6.25%
2020	1,215	83.22%	221	15.14%	24	1.64%
2024	1,137	81.33%	238	17.02%	23	1.65%

== Education ==
School districts include:

- Gackle-Streeter Public School District 56
- Fessenden-Bowdon Public School District 25
- Kidder County School District 1
- Hazelton-Moffit-Braddock Public School District 6
- Napoleon Public School District 2

== See also ==
- National Register of Historic Places listings in Kidder County, North Dakota
