= Dawson, North Dakota =

- City
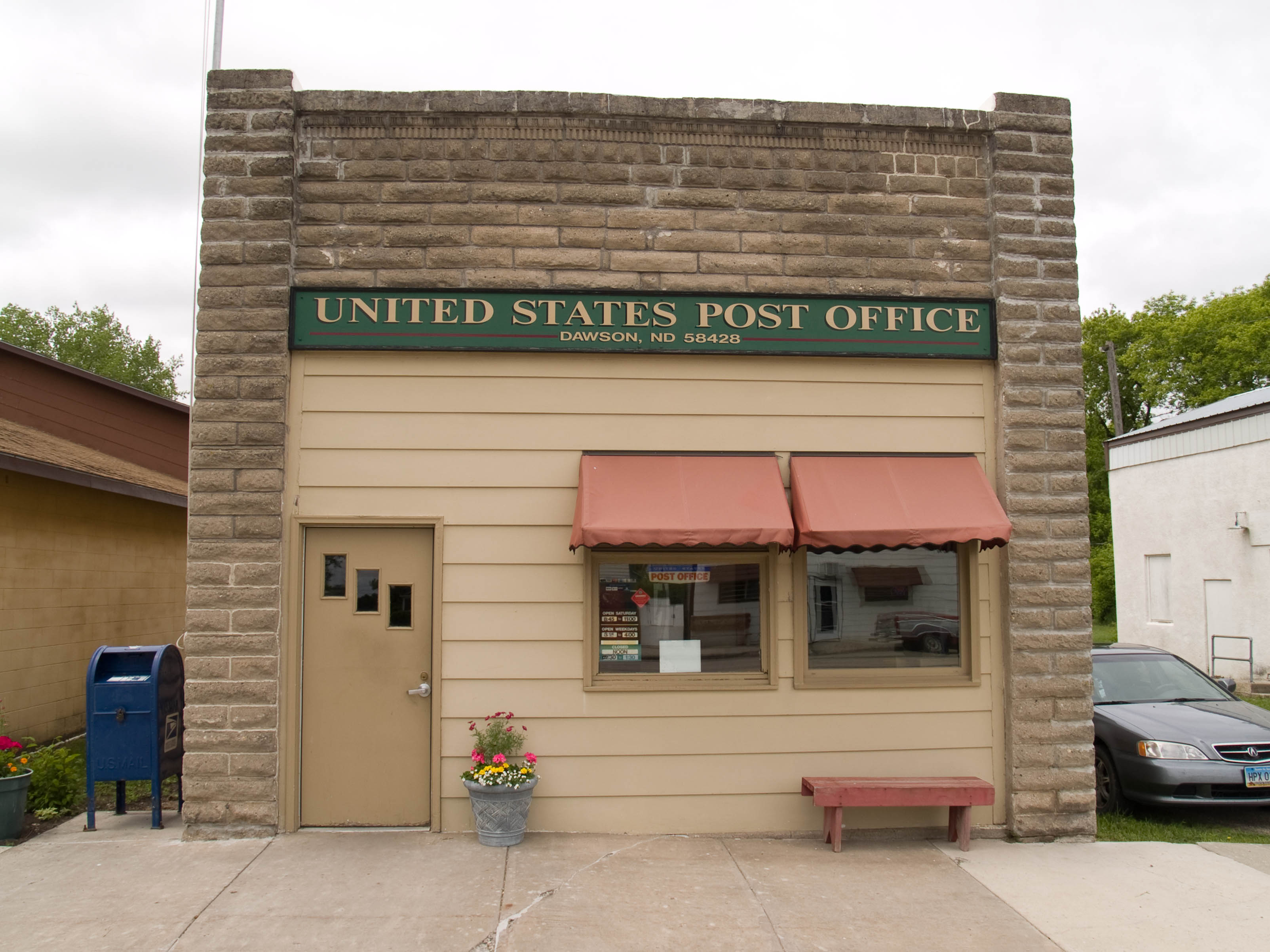
- Post office in Dawson (June 2008)
- Interactive map of Dawson, North Dakota
- Location within North Dakota
- Coordinates: 46.8679°N 99.7536°W
- Country: United States
- State: North Dakota
- County: Kidder
- Founded: 1882
- Incorporated (village): August 15, 1917
- Incorporated (city): July 1, 1967
- Founded by: Joshua Dawson Thompson
- Named after: Joshua Dawson Thompson

Area
  - Total: 0.341 sq mi (0.882 km^{2})
  - Land: 0.341 sq mi (0.882 km^{2})
  - Water: 0 sq mi (0.000 km^{2}) 0.00%
- Elevation: 1,749 ft (533 m)

Population (2020)
  - Total: 74
  - Estimate (2025): 76
  - Density: 220/sq mi (84/km^{2})
- Time zone: UTC–6 (Central (CST))
  - Summer (DST): UTC–5 (CDT)
- ZIP Code: 58428
- Area code: 701
- FIPS code: 38-18260
- GNIS feature ID: 1035984
- Highway: ND 3

Dawson is a city in Kidder County, North Dakota, United States. The population was 74 as of the 2020 census, and was estimated at 76 in 2025.

Dawson has a veteran's memorial wall to honor soldiers in foreign wars.

== History ==
Dawson was founded in 1882 by Joshua Dawson Thompson, and named for him. A post office has been in operation at Dawson since 1881.

== Geography ==
According to the United States Census Bureau, the city has a total area of 0.341 square miles (0.88 km^{2}), all land.

== Demographics ==
Historical population
Census	Pop.	Note	%±
1920	298		—
1930	306		2.7%
1940	263		−14.1%
1950	280		6.5%
1960	206		−26.4%
1970	131		−36.4%
1980	144		9.9%
1990	78		−45.8%
2000	75		−3.8%
2010	61		−18.7%
2020	74		21.3%
2025 (est.)	76		2.7%
U.S. Decennial Census; 2020 Census

=== 2020 census ===
As of the 2020 census, there were 74 people, 35 households, and 22 families residing in the city. The population density was 217.01 inhabitants per square mile (83.8/km^{2}). There were 48 housing units at an average density of 140.76 per square mile (54.3/km^{2}). The racial makeup of the city was 98.65% White, and 1.35% from two or more races. Hispanic or Latino people of any race were 1.35% of the population.

=== 2010 census ===
As of the 2010 census, there were 61 people, 30 households, and 16 families residing in the city. The population density was 179.41 inhabitants per square mile (69.3/km^{2}). There were 54 housing units at an average density of 158.82 per square mile (61.3/km^{2}). The racial makeup of the city was 100.00% White, % African American, % Native American, % Asian, % Pacific Islander, % from some other races and % from two or more races. Hispanic or Latino people of any race were 8.20% of the population.

There were 30 households, of which 20.0% had children under the age of 18 living with them, 40.0% were married couples living together, 6.7% had a female householder with no husband present, 6.7% had a male householder with no wife present, and 46.7% were non-families. 46.7% of all households were made up of individuals, and 16.6% had someone living alone who was 65 years of age or older. The average household size was 2.03 and the average family size was 2.75.

The median age in the city was 52.5 years. 21.3% of residents were under the age of 18; 6.6% were between the ages of 18 and 24; 16.4% were from 25 to 44; 32.8% were from 45 to 64; and 23% were 65 years of age or older. The gender makeup of the city was 57.4% male and 42.6% female.

=== 2000 census ===
As of the 2000 census, there were 75 people, 38 households, and 16 families residing in the city. The population density was 186.89 inhabitants per square mile (72.2/km^{2}). There were 52 housing units at an average density of 129.58 per square mile (50.0/km^{2}). The racial makeup of the city was 100.00% White.

There were 38 households, out of which 18.4% had children under the age of 18 living with them, 31.6% were married couples living together, 2.6% had a female householder with no husband present, and 55.3% were non-families. 52.6% of all households were made up of individuals, and 36.8% had someone living alone who was 65 years of age or older. The average household size was 1.97 and the average family size was 3.00.

In the city, the population was spread out, with 20.0% under the age of 18, 9.3% from 18 to 24, 14.7% from 25 to 44, 25.3% from 45 to 64, and 30.7% who were 65 years of age or older. The median age was 49 years. For every 100 females, there were 127.3 males. For every 100 females age 18 and over, there were 93.5 males.

The median income for a household in the city was $20,833, and the median income for a family was $22,917. Males had a median income of $23,750 versus $0 for females. The per capita income for the city was $13,192. There were no families and 20.3% of the population living below the poverty line, including no under eighteens and 23.3% of those over 64.

== Notable people ==
- Mae Krier, veteran and activist

== See also ==
- Harker Lake
- Upper Harker Lake
