= Sibley Lake (Minnesota) =

Lake in the state of Minnesota, United States

- Location within Minnesota
- Location: Minnesota
- Coordinates: 46°35′36″N 94°19′28″W
- Type: lake

Sibley Lake is a lake in the U.S. state of Minnesota.

Sibley Lake was named for Henry Hastings Sibley, 1st Governor of Minnesota.

== See also ==
- List of lakes in Minnesota
