= Lincoln Township, Emmons County, North Dakota =

Coordinates: 46°29′57″N 100°05′56″W

Lincoln Township is a former township of Emmons County, North Dakota, United States. The township recorded a population of 28 during the 2000 Census.

== History ==
Lincoln township existed briefly as a school township with a population of 153 during the 1920 Census, but was counted as part of survey township T135 North, R75 West, in subsequent censuses. It was later organized as a civil township from 1981 until 2007, when the area was added the unorganized territory of North Emmons.
