= Hazelton, North Dakota =

- City
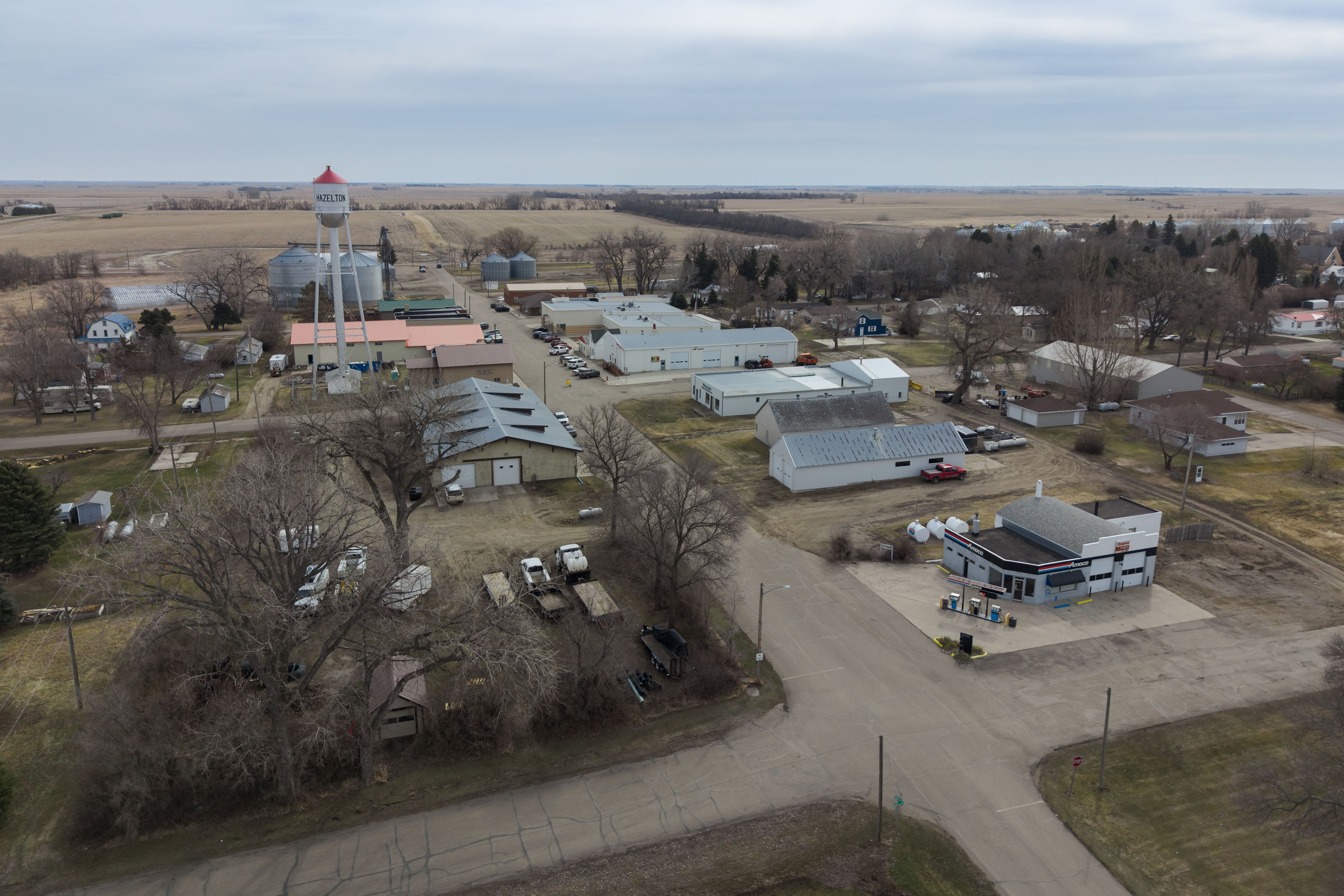
- Aerial view of Hazelton (2026)

- Location of Hazelton, North Dakota
- Coordinates: 46°29′09″N 100°16′52″W
- Country: United States
- State: North Dakota
- County: Emmons
- Founded: 1902

Area
  - Total: 0.38 sq mi (0.99 km^{2})
  - Land: 0.38 sq mi (0.99 km^{2})
  - Water: 0 sq mi (0.00 km^{2})
- Elevation: 1,982 ft (604 m)

Population (2020)
  - Total: 223
  - Estimate (2022): 221
  - Density: 582.3/sq mi (224.81/km^{2})
- Time zone: UTC-6 (Central (CST))
  - Summer (DST): UTC-5 (CDT)
- ZIP code: 58544
- Area code: 701
- FIPS code: 38-36700
- GNIS feature ID: 1036088

Hazelton is a city in Emmons County, North Dakota, United States. The population was 223 at the 2020 census.

== History ==
Hazelton was founded in 1902. Hazelton was named after Hazel, John Roop's daughter.

Hazelton once was known as the flax capital of the nation.

To combat population loss, city leaders of Hazelton have offered free land and start up money for people to move there.

== Geography ==
According to the United States Census Bureau, the city has a total area of 0.36 square miles (0.93 km^{2}), all land.

== Demographics ==
Historical population
Census	Pop.	Note	%±
1920	382		—
1930	446		16.8%
1940	500		12.1%
1950	453		−9.4%
1960	451		−0.4%
1970	374		−17.1%
1980	266		−28.9%
1990	240		−9.8%
2000	237		−1.2%
2010	235		−0.8%
2020	223		−5.1%
2022 (est.)	221		−0.9%
U.S. Decennial Census; 2020 Census

=== 2010 census ===
As of the census of 2010, there were 235 people, 107 households, and 61 families residing in the city. The population density was 652.8 inhabitants per square mile (252.0/km^{2}). There were 126 housing units at an average density of 350.0 per square mile (135.1/km^{2}). The racial makeup of the city was 97.4% White, 2.1% Native American, and 0.4% from two or more races. Hispanic or Latino of any race were 1.7% of the population.

There were 107 households, of which 22.4% had children under the age of 18 living with them, 45.8% were married couples living together, 7.5% had a female householder with no husband present, 3.7% had a male householder with no wife present, and 43.0% were non-families. 40.2% of all households were made up of individuals, and 22.4% had someone living alone who was 65 years of age or older. The average household size was 2.20 and the average family size was 2.95.

The median age in the city was 46.9 years. 24.3% of residents were under the age of 18; 5% were between the ages of 18 and 24; 18.3% were from 25 to 44; 25.9% were from 45 to 64; and 26.4% were 65 years of age or older. The gender makeup of the city was 51.5% male and 48.5% female.

=== 2000 census ===
As of the census of 2000, there were 237 people, 117 households, and 62 families residing in the city. The population density was 988.5 inhabitants per square mile (381.7/km^{2}). There were 129 housing units at an average density of 538.0 per square mile (207.7/km^{2}). The racial makeup of the city was 100.00% White. Hispanic or Latino of any race were 1.27% of the population.

There were 117 households, out of which 21.4% had children under the age of 18 living with them, 47.9% were married couples living together, 2.6% had a female householder with no husband present, and 47.0% were non-families. 46.2% of all households were made up of individuals, and 29.9% had someone living alone who was 65 years of age or older. The average household size was 2.03 and the average family size was 2.90.

In the city, the age distribution of the population shows 22.4% under the age of 18, 3.8% from 18 to 24, 19.4% from 25 to 44, 24.5% from 45 to 64, and 30.0% who were 65 years of age or older. The median age was 49 years. For every 100 females, there were 99.2 males. For every 100 females age 18 and over, there were 97.8 males.

As of 2000 the median income for a household was $17,778, and the median income for a family was $31,250. Males had a median income of $25,000 versus $15,625 for females. The per capita income for the city was $12,152. About 17.9% of families and 20.0% of the population were below the poverty line, including 17.9% of those under the age of eighteen and 25.0% of those 65 or over.

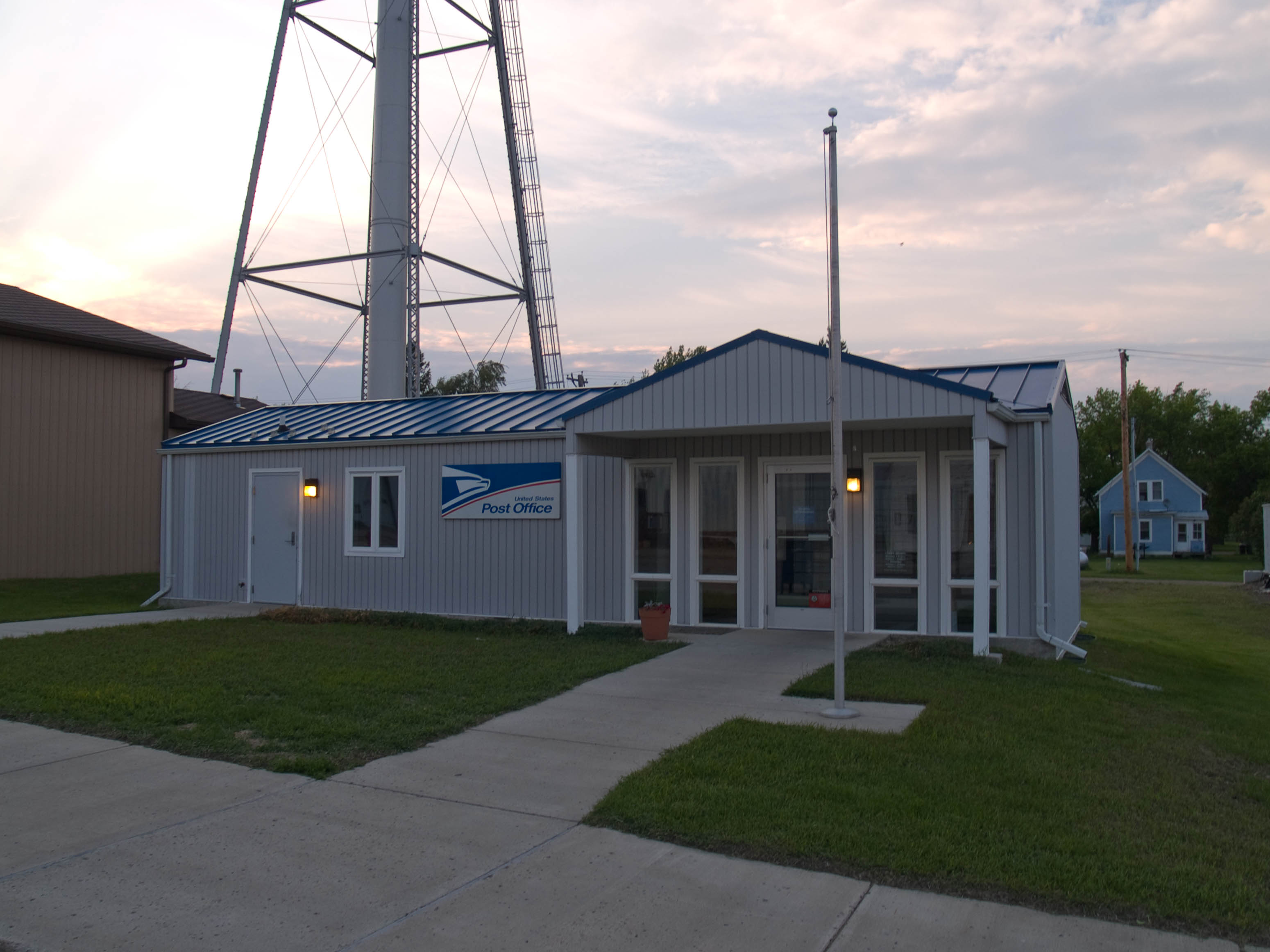
U.S. Post office in Hazelton

== Education ==
It is in the Hazelton-Moffit-Braddock Public School District 6.

== Climate ==
This climatic region is typified by large seasonal temperature differences, with warm to hot (and often humid) summers and cold (sometimes severely cold) winters. According to the Köppen Climate Classification system, Hazelton has a humid continental climate, abbreviated "Dfb" on climate maps.

Climate data for Hazelton, North Dakota, 1991–2020 normals, extremes 1991–present
Month	Jan	Feb	Mar	Apr	May	Jun	Jul	Aug	Sep	Oct	Nov	Dec	Year
Record high °F (°C)	60 (16)	67 (19)	80 (27)	90 (32)	93 (34)	106 (41)	107 (42)	105 (41)	99 (37)	91 (33)	75 (24)	64 (18)	107 (42)
Mean maximum °F (°C)	43.0 (6.1)	45.7 (7.6)	63.0 (17.2)	77.3 (25.2)	85.1 (29.5)	88.9 (31.6)	93.2 (34.0)	94.0 (34.4)	90.0 (32.2)	79.9 (26.6)	62.0 (16.7)	46.3 (7.9)	96.0 (35.6)
Mean daily maximum °F (°C)	20.1 (−6.6)	24.6 (−4.1)	37.3 (2.9)	53.2 (11.8)	65.9 (18.8)	74.9 (23.8)	81.2 (27.3)	80.3 (26.8)	71.1 (21.7)	54.9 (12.7)	38.1 (3.4)	25.2 (−3.8)	52.2 (11.2)
Daily mean °F (°C)	11.0 (−11.7)	14.9 (−9.5)	26.9 (−2.8)	40.7 (4.8)	53.3 (11.8)	63.3 (17.4)	68.7 (20.4)	67.1 (19.5)	57.9 (14.4)	43.4 (6.3)	28.3 (−2.1)	16.5 (−8.6)	41.0 (5.0)
Mean daily minimum °F (°C)	1.8 (−16.8)	5.2 (−14.9)	16.5 (−8.6)	28.1 (−2.2)	40.8 (4.9)	51.6 (10.9)	56.3 (13.5)	53.9 (12.2)	44.8 (7.1)	31.9 (−0.1)	18.4 (−7.6)	7.8 (−13.4)	29.8 (−1.3)
Mean minimum °F (°C)	−22.1 (−30.1)	−17.0 (−27.2)	−5.3 (−20.7)	12.0 (−11.1)	27.2 (−2.7)	40.0 (4.4)	46.3 (7.9)	44.0 (6.7)	30.3 (−0.9)	15.5 (−9.2)	0.0 (−17.8)	−14.7 (−25.9)	−24.5 (−31.4)
Record low °F (°C)	−34 (−37)	−35 (−37)	−22 (−30)	−2 (−19)	19 (−7)	33 (1)	35 (2)	37 (3)	23 (−5)	−3 (−19)	−16 (−27)	−28 (−33)	−35 (−37)
Average precipitation inches (mm)	0.44 (11)	0.49 (12)	0.85 (22)	1.40 (36)	2.78 (71)	3.35 (85)	3.01 (76)	2.20 (56)	1.61 (41)	1.69 (43)	0.56 (14)	0.62 (16)	19 (483)
Average snowfall inches (cm)	8.9 (23)	6.8 (17)	6.5 (17)	4.3 (11)	0.2 (0.51)	0.0 (0.0)	0.0 (0.0)	0.0 (0.0)	0.0 (0.0)	2.6 (6.6)	6.9 (18)	8.5 (22)	44.7 (115.11)
Average precipitation days (≥ 0.01 in)	4.8	5.1	5.0	6.9	10.1	11.0	9.2	7.4	7.0	6.9	4.5	4.6	82.5
Average snowy days (≥ 0.1 in)	6.6	5.1	4.2	1.5	0.1	0.0	0.0	0.0	0.1	1.6	3.7	5.4	28.3
Source 1: NOAA
Source 2: National Weather Service
