= Long Lake National Wildlife Refuge =

Protected area in North Dakota, United States

- IUCN category IV (habitat/species management area)
- Location within the United States
- Location: Burleigh, Kidder counties, North Dakota, United States
- Nearest city: Steele, North Dakota
- Coordinates: 46°43′46″N 100°02′25″W
- Area: 22,300 acres (90 km^{2})
- Established: 1932
- Governing body: U.S. Fish and Wildlife Service
- Website: www.fws.gov/refuge/long_lake/

Long Lake National Wildlife Refuge, located in south-central North Dakota, was established in 1932 as a migratory bird refuge by President Herbert Hoover. The 22,300-acre (90 km^{2}) refuge consists of a 15,000-acre (61 km^{2}) saline basin that is 18 miles (29 km) long and is named "Long Lake". Long Lake is relatively shallow; it is normally 3–4 feet (0.91–1.22 m) deep. During extended wet periods, Long Lake reaches depths up to 7 feet (2.1 m).

The shallow depths and lengths of meandering shoreline provide vast expanses of habitat that attract migrating and nesting species of waterfowl, shorebirds, and rare migrant birds. In recognition of the Refuge's significance in the ongoing effort to conserve wild birds and their habitat, Long Lake was designated as a "Globally Important Bird Area" in 2001. Also, due to the special importance of Long Lake National Wildlife Refuge to migrating shorebirds, the Refuge was recently recognized as a "Western Hemisphere Shorebird Reserve Network" site.
