= North Dakota Highway 21 =

State highway in North Dakota, United States

North Dakota Highway 21
- ND 21 highlighted in red

Route information
- Maintained by NDDOT
- Length: 123 mi (198 km)
- Existed: unknown–present

Major junctions
- West end: US 85 east-northeast of Amidon
- ND 67 near New England; ND 8 in Mott; ND 49 from New Leipzig to Elgin; ND 31 near Flasher
- East end: ND 6 north of Breien

Location
- Country: United States
- State: North Dakota
- Counties: Morton, Grant, Hettinger, Slope

Highway system
- North Dakota State Highway System; Interstate; US; State
| ← ND 20 | → ND 22 |

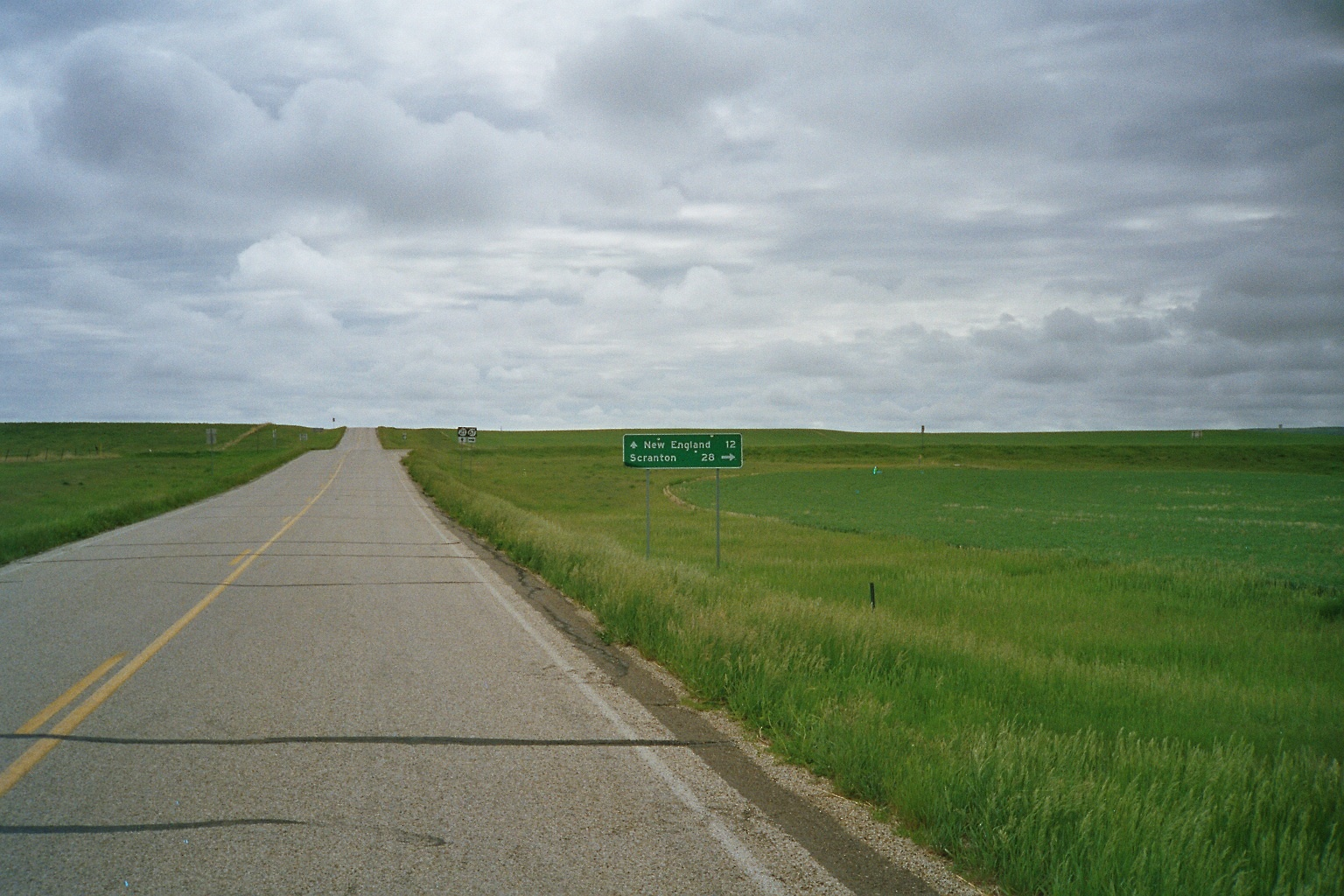
North Dakota Highway 21

North Dakota Highway 21 (ND 21) is an east-west highway in North Dakota. The eastern terminus is at ND 6 about 5 miles (8.0 km) north of Breien and the western terminus is at U.S. Route 85 (US 85) about 5 miles (8.0 km) east-northeast of Amidon. The highway is known for the large number of abandonments located along it.

== Route description ==
ND 21 runs east from its western terminus at US 85 for 15.7 miles before turning south onto ND 22 near New England for 8.1 miles. after the concurrency, ND 21 heads east for 28.7 miles, intersecting the Enchanted Highway and passing south of Regent, and sharing the road with ND 8 near Mott. In Mott, ND 21 turns off again to head east for the last 69.5 miles; along the way, ND 21 skirts north of Burt and Bentley, picks up ND 49 near New Leipzig and exits the concurrency at Elgin, passes north of Heil and Leith and south of Carson and Lark, and meets the northern end of ND 31 near Flasher. It ends at a junction with ND 6 north of Breien.

== History ==
The current ND-24 segment between ND-6 and the current ND-24/ND-1806 junction was originally part of ND-21. This segment was renumbered between 1950 and 1963.

== Major intersections ==
| County | Location | mi | km | Destinations | Notes |
|---|---|---|---|---|---|
| Slope | | 0.0 | 0.0 | US 85 – Belfield, Amidon, Bowman | Western terminus of ND 21 |
| Slope | | | | ND 67 south – Scranton | Northern terminus of ND 67 |
| Hettinger | New England | | | ND 22 north – Dickinson | Northern end of ND 22 concurrency |
| Hettinger | | | | ND 22 south – Reeder | Southern end of ND 22 concurrency |
| Hettinger | | | | ND 8 south – Hettinger | Western end of ND 8 concurrency |
| Hettinger | Mott | | | ND 8 north – Richardton | Eastern end of ND 8 concurrency |
| Grant | New Leipzig | | | ND 49 south – Thunder Hawk | Western end of ND 49 concurrency |
| Grant | Elgin | | | ND 49 north – Lake Tschida, Glen Ullin | Eastern end of ND 49 concurrency |
| Grant–Morton county line | | | | ND 31 south – Raleigh | Northern terminus of ND 31 |
| Morton | | | | ND 6 – Mandan, Selfridge, Fort Yates | Eastern terminus of ND 21 |
1.000 mi = 1.609 km; 1.000 km = 0.621 mi: Concurrency terminus
