= North Dakota Highway 67 =

State highway in North Dakota, U.S.

North Dakota Highway 67
- ND 67 highlighted in red

Route information
- Maintained by NDDOT
- Length: 27.466 mi (44.202 km)
- Existed: between 1950 and 1963–present

Major junctions
- South end: US 12 in Scranton
- North end: ND 21 near New England

Location
- Country: United States
- State: North Dakota
- Counties: Bowman; Slope

Highway system
- North Dakota State Highway System; Interstate; US; State
← ND 66	→ ND 68

North Dakota Highway 67 (ND 67) is a 27.466-mile (44.202 km) north–south feeder highway in southwest North Dakota, United States. The southern terminus is at U.S. Route 12 (US 12) in Scranton and the northern terminus is at ND 21 near New England.

== Route description ==
ND 67 begins at an informal jughandle interchange outside of Scranton and runs north to ND 21. With the exception of the segment in Scranton, all other sections of ND 67 have a speed limit of 65 MPH (105 km/h) and a weight limit of 40 Tons. There are no major intersections between Scranton and the northern terminus at ND 21.

== Major intersections ==
County	Location	mi	km	Destinations	Notes
Bowman	Scranton	0.000	0.000	US 12 – Bowman, Hettinger	Southern terminus
Slope		27.466	44.202	ND 21 – Amidon, New England	Northern terminus
1.000 mi = 1.609 km; 1.000 km = 0.621 mi

== See also ==
- List of state highways in North Dakota
- List of highways numbered 67
