= Yule Ranch =

Historic ranch in North Dakota, United States

- Ranch
- Interactive map of Yule Ranch
- Coordinates: 46°33′34″N 103°48′13″W
- Country: United States
- State: North Dakota
- County: Golden Valley and Slope

Yule Ranch (now Three V Ranch) is a historic property in Golden Valley and Slope counties in North Dakota, United States.

== Background ==
Founded in 1883 by John Pender as the JXL Ranch or Yule Ranch, historically the ranch was a multi-state cattle operation. After changing hands it was renamed as the VVV Ranch in 1937. The VVV brand had previously been established in 1898 at another ranch. At one time it was home to a small community including a post office bearing the name Yule, a general store, and a stage coach stop. The post office closed in 1910. Today the ranch raises Angus cattle, grows cash crops, and caters to hunters looking for mule and whitetail deer, coyotes and sharptail grouse. Theodore Roosevelt enjoyed staying at the ranch and conducted one of his last bison hunting excursions there.

== Three V Crossing ==
Three V Crossing
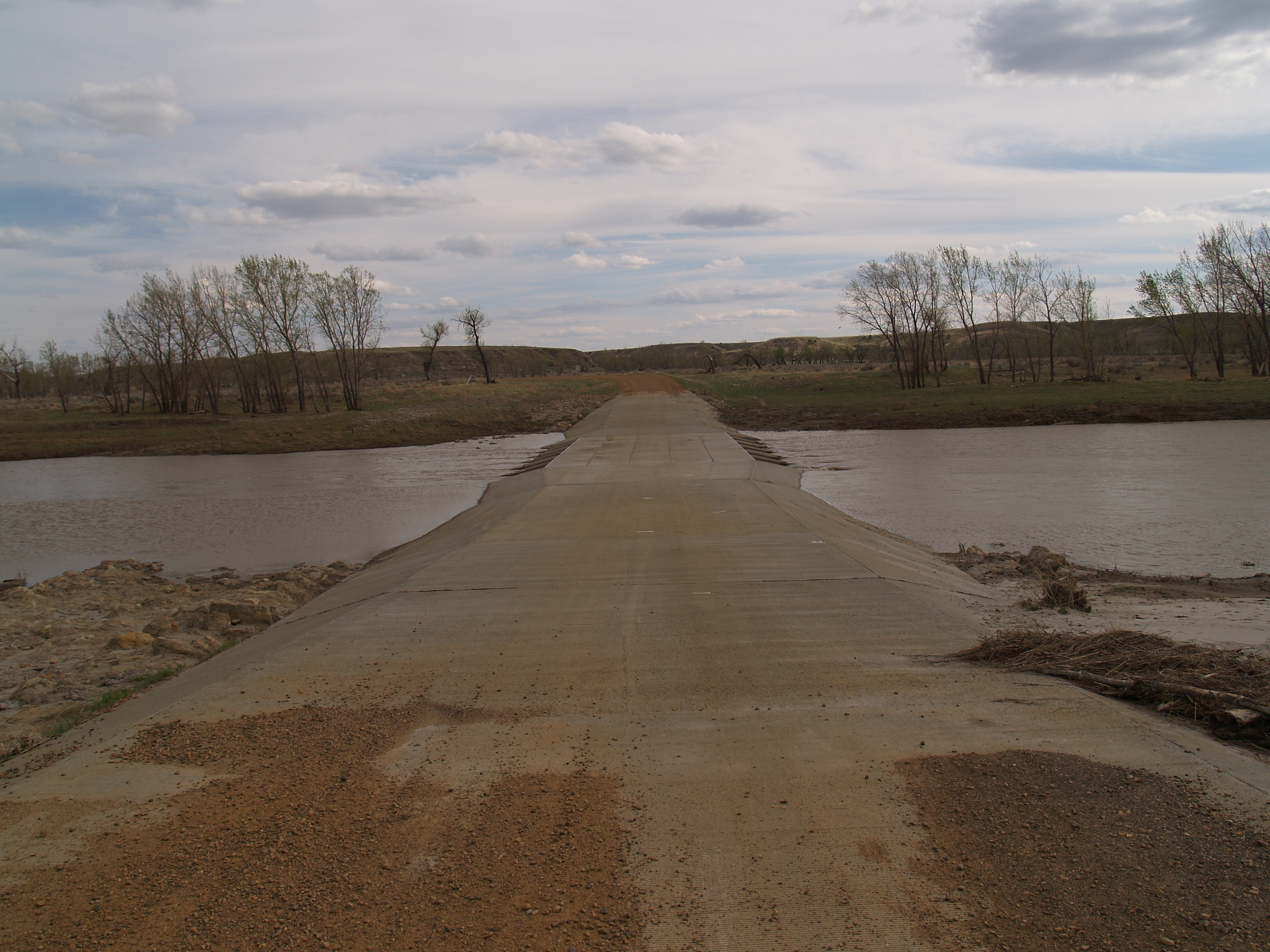
- Three V Crossing
- Coordinates: 46.5569°N 103.7925°W
- Carries: Vvv Road
- Crosses: Little Missouri River
- Locale: Slope County, North Dakota. GNIS feature ID 1035208

Characteristics
- Design: Low-water crossing
- Material: Concrete

Location
- Interactive map of Three V Crossing

A major landmark on the ranch is Three V Crossing, a low-water crossing on the Little Missouri River 19.1 miles (30.7 km) north-northeast of Marmarth and 27 miles (43 km) northwest of Amidon within the Little Missouri National Grassland in an unorganized part of Slope County in T. 135 N R. 105 W.

The construction of the crossing was jointly funded by the National Forest Service program and the county. It is part of Forest Development Road (FDR) 7741. Water underneath passes through concrete box culverts. Access across the Missouri River is unreliable when waters are high.

On the east side of the crossing, a geological layer known as the Rhame Bed is characterized by having yellowish sand, with very pale green material underneath.

== See also ==
- Elkhorn Ranch
