= South Dakota Highway 73 =

State highway in South Dakota, United States

Highway 73

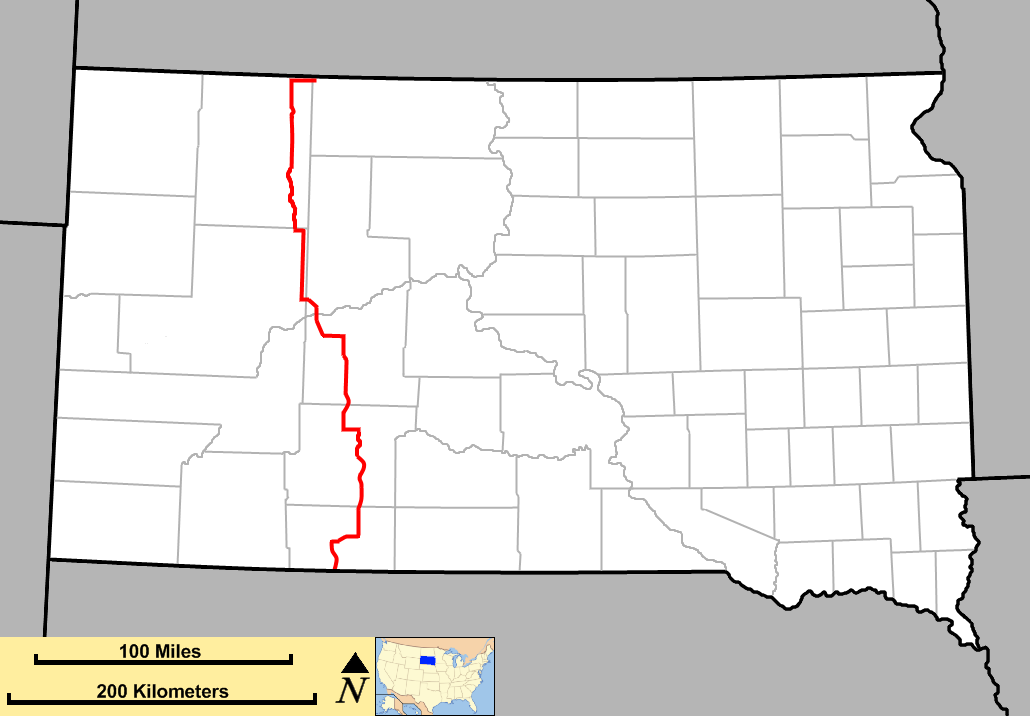
- Route of SD 73 (in red)

Route information
- Maintained by SDDOT
- Length: 255.291 mi (410.851 km)
- Existed: 1926–present

Major junctions
- South end: N-61 at the Nebraska border near Merriman, NE
- US 18 in Martin; I-90 in Kadoka; US 14 in Philip; US 212 in Faith; SD 20 near Bison; US 12 in Lemmon
- North end: ND 49 at the North Dakota border in Thunder Hawk

Location
- Country: United States
- State: South Dakota
- Counties: Bennett, Jackson, Haakon, Ziebach, Meade, Perkins, Corson

Highway system
- South Dakota State Trunk Highway System; Interstate; US; State
← SD 71	→ SD 75

South Dakota Highway 73 (SD 73) is a state route that runs across western South Dakota. It begins at the Nebraska border, north of Merriman, Nebraska, as a continuation of Nebraska Highway 61. It runs to the North Dakota border, where it continues as North Dakota Highway 49. It is just more than 255 miles (410 km) in length.

== History ==
When designated in the 1920s, South Dakota 73 only consisted of the segment from Faith (U.S. Route 212) to Lemmon (U.S. Route 12). The remainder of the route was unnumbered.

Around 1935, SD 73 was extended south from Faith, absorbing what had been a portion of South Dakota Highway 24 to near Plainview, then southeast via a new route to Philip. From there, it was concurrent with U.S. Highway 16 to Kadoka then southward along what had been South Dakota Highway 63. It continued south to the Nebraska border south of Martin, after sharing an alignment with U.S. Highway 18. Except for minor route straightening and a new concurrency with Interstate 90, this route has not changed since.

Around 1979, the northern terminus was extended east along U.S. 12 to Thunder Hawk, where it met up with a new road to link with ND 49.

== Major intersections ==
County	Location	mi	km	Destinations	Notes
Cherry		0.000	0.000	N-61 south	Continuation into Nebraska
Bennett	Martin	12.580	20.246	US 18 west	Western end of US 18 concurrency
Bennett		24.646	39.664	US 18 east	Eastern end of US 18 concurrency
Jackson		50.339	81.013	SD 44	
Jackson	Kadoka	69.951	112.575	SD 248	
Jackson	Kadoka	70.310– 70.328	113.153– 113.182	I-90 east	Eastern end of I-90 concurrency
Jackson		76.616– 77.227	123.301– 124.285	I-90 west	Western end of I-90 concurrency
Haakon	Philip	92.047	148.135	US 14	
Haakon		116.740	187.875	SD 34 east	Eastern end of SD 34 concurrency
Ziebach	No major junctions				
Meade		145.523	234.197	SD 34 west	Western end of SD 34 concurrency
Meade	Faith	173.638	279.443	US 212 east	Eastern end of US 212 concurrency
Meade		176.801	284.534	US 212 west	Western end of US 212 concurrency
Perkins		206.704	332.658	SD 20 east	Southern end of SD 20 concurrency
Perkins		212.698	342.304	SD 20 west	Northern end of SD 20 concurrency
Perkins		240.858	387.623	US 12 west	Western end of US 12 concurrency
Corson		254.618	409.768	US 12 east	Eastern end of US 12 concurrency
Sioux		255.291	410.851	ND 49 north	Continuation into North Dakota
1.000 mi = 1.609 km; 1.000 km = 0.621 mi: Concurrency terminus
