= Route 67 (disambiguation) =

Route 67 could refer to:

- one of several highways numbered 67
- London Buses route 67
- Melbourne tram route 67
- SEPTA Route 67
