= Little Missouri National Grassland =

Protected grassland in North Dakota, USA

- Little Missouri National Grassland on Interstate 94

- Location within North Dakota Location within the United States
- Interactive map of Little Missouri National Grassland
- Location: North Dakota, United States
- Nearest city: Medora, North Dakota
- Coordinates: 47°05′56″N 103°32′13″W
- Area: 1,028,784 acres (4,163.34 km^{2})
- Established: June 23, 1960
- Governing body: U.S. Forest Service
- Website: Little Missouri National Grassland

Little Missouri National Grassland is a National Grassland located in western North Dakota, United States. At 1,028,051 acres (416,037 ha), it is the largest grassland in the country. Enclaved within its borders is Theodore Roosevelt National Park with an additional 70,446 acres (28,508 ha), which is managed by the National Park Service. The Little Missouri National Grassland was once a part of the Custer National Forest, but is now a part of the Dakota Prairie Grasslands, a National Forest unit consisting entirely of National Grasslands. A predominant feature of the grassland is colorful and beautiful badlands, a rugged terrain extensively eroded by wind and water. It is a mixed-grass prairie with both long and short grass.

The Little Missouri River meanders through the grassland and White Butte, North Dakota's highest point, is located in the extreme southeast corner, south of the town of Amidon.

In descending order of land area, it is located in parts of McKenzie, Billings, Slope, and Golden Valley counties. Within the boundaries of the national grassland are significant portions of state-owned and privately owned land, much of it leased by cattle ranchers for grazing.

The grassland is administered by the Forest Service as part of the Dakota Prairie Grasslands from offices in Bismarck, North Dakota. There are local ranger district offices in Dickinson and Watford City.

Oil and gas exploration, extraction, and distribution in the region has the potential for long term negative impacts on the soil, water, vegetation, and wildlife of the grassland, including threatened and endangered species.

== See also ==
- Initial Rock
- Yule Ranch
