= North Dakota Highway 49 =

State highway in North Dakota, U.S.

North Dakota Highway 49
- ND 49 highlighted in red

Route information
- Maintained by NDDOT
- Length: 104.407 mi (168.027 km)
- Existed: c. 1927–present

Major junctions
- South end: SD 73 at the South Dakota border near Thunder Hawk, SD
- I-94 northeast of Glen Ullin
- North end: ND 200/ CR 21 north of Beulah

Location
- Country: United States
- State: North Dakota
- Counties: Sioux, Grant, Morton, Mercer

Highway system
- North Dakota State Highway System; Interstate; US; State
← ND 48	→ ND 50

North Dakota Highway 49 (ND 49) is a 104.407-mile-long (168.027 km) north–south state highway in the U.S. state of North Dakota. ND 49's southern terminus is a continuation as South Dakota Highway 73 (SD 73) at the South Dakota border, and the northern terminus is at ND 200/CR 21 north of Beulah.

== Major intersections ==
County	Location	mi	km	Destinations	Notes
Sioux		0.000	0.000	SD 73 south – Thunder Hawk	Continuation into South Dakota
Grant		29.762	47.897	ND 21 west – Mott	Southern end of ND 21 concurrency
Grant	Elgin	36.331	58.469	ND 21 east – Carson	Northern end of ND 21 concurrency
Morton		73.943	119.000	I-94 – Billings, Bismarck	I-94 exit 110; diamond interchange
Mercer		104.407	168.027	ND 200 / CR 21 – Zap, Killdeer, Hazen	Northern terminus, roundabout, road continues north as CR 21
1.000 mi = 1.609 km; 1.000 km = 0.621 mi: Concurrency terminus
