= Emily Sloane =

Emily Sloane may refer to:

- Emily Sloane (Alias), a character from the TV series Alias, portrayed by Amy Irving
- Emily Vanderbilt Sloane (1874–1970), author, philanthropist, and socialite

== See also ==
- Emily E. Sloan (1878–1973), first woman elected to the office of county attorney in Montana
