= KPOK =

- Bowman, North Dakota; United States
- Broadcast area: Bowman, North Dakota; Bowman County, North Dakota
- Frequency: 1340 kHz
- Branding: KPOK 1340AM

Programming
- Format: Country
- Affiliations: USA Headline News

Ownership
- Owner: Angela L. Headley; (JAK Communications, Limited Liability Company)

History
- First air date: August 9, 1980

Technical information
- Licensing authority: FCC
- Facility ID: 67796
- Class: C
- Power: 1,000 watts (unlimited)
- Transmitter coordinates: 46°10′48.0″N 103°22′12.0″W

Links
- Public license information: Public file; LMS
- Webcast: Listen live
- Website: kpokradio.com

KPOK is a Country formatted broadcast radio station licensed to Bowman, North Dakota, serving Bowman and Bowman County, North Dakota. KPOK is owned and operated by JAK Communications, Limited Liability Company.

== Station Sale ==
It was announced in "Upper Midwest Broadcasting" (May 26, 2017) that KPOK was being sold. JAK Communications, Limited Liability Company was to buy KPOK from Tri-State Communications for $125,000. JAK is owned by Angela Headley of Bowman, Karen Paulson of Bowman, and Haley Sabe of Scranton. The future format of the station after sale is unknown. The purchase by JAK Communications was consummated on July 8, 2017, at a price of $97,000.
