= Bowman County School District 1 =

School district in Bowman, North Dakota, USA

Address
- 102 8th Avenue SW Bowman, North Dakota, 58623; United States

District information
- Type: Public
- Grades: PreK–12
- NCES District ID: 3803200

Students and staff
- Students: 509
- Teachers: 51.15
- Staff: 45.21
- Student–teacher ratio: 9.95

Other information
- Website: www.bowman.k12.nd.us

Bowman County School District 1 is a school district headquartered in Bowman, North Dakota.

It serves Bowman and Rhame in Bowman County. It also serves a section of Slope County.

As of 2020 the district had 300 elementary school students.

== History ==
Bowman and Rhame schools consolidated in 2005.

David Mahon served as the superintendent. In summer 2018 he was removed from his position and given $90,000 in severance pay after he was charged with misdemeanors related to drug offenses. In 2019 he entered into a plea where the charges are suspended and would be expunged if he maintained good behavior for 365 days.

In 2020 the Central Elementary Public School District 32 dissolved, and was divided between Bowman County School District No. 1 and New England School District No. 9.

== Schools ==
- Bowman County High School (7-12)
- Rhame School (K-6)
- Bowman Middle School (4-6)
- Roosevelt School (K-3)
- School of Promise (preschool)
