= Custer Military Trail Historic Archaeological District =

Historic district in North Dakota, United States

- Custer Military Trail Historic Archeological District
- U.S. National Register of Historic Places
- U.S. Historic district
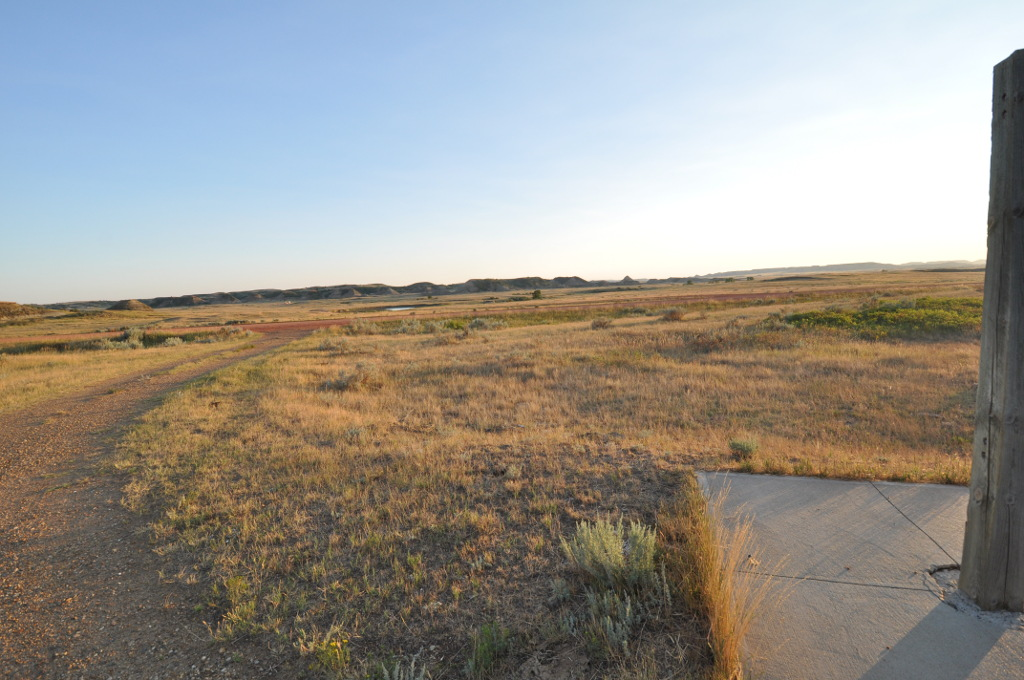
- Easy Hill Camp
- Location: Address restricted
- Nearest city: Medora, North Dakota
- Area: 18,149 acres (7,345 ha)
- Built: 1864
- NRHP reference No.: 08001293
- Added to NRHP: June 5, 2009

The Custer Military Trail Historic Archeological District is a national historic district consisting of 18,149 acres (7,345 ha) located in Billings and Golden Valley Counties in North Dakota. The district includes five historic sites associated with the Plains Indian War from 1864 to 1876.

The historic sites include Initial Rock, a site where George Custer's 7th Cavalry Regiment camped on May 28, 1876, en route to Little Bighorn. Two privates in Custer's regiment, W. C. Williams and F. Neely, carved their initials into a sandstone boulder at the site. The district also includes two additional military campsites, the site of the Battle of the Badlands, and portions of a military supply trail. The district was listed on the National Register of Historic Places in 2009. The district has five contributing sites.
