= Initial Rock =

- U.S. National Register of Historic Places
- U.S. Historic district – Contributing property
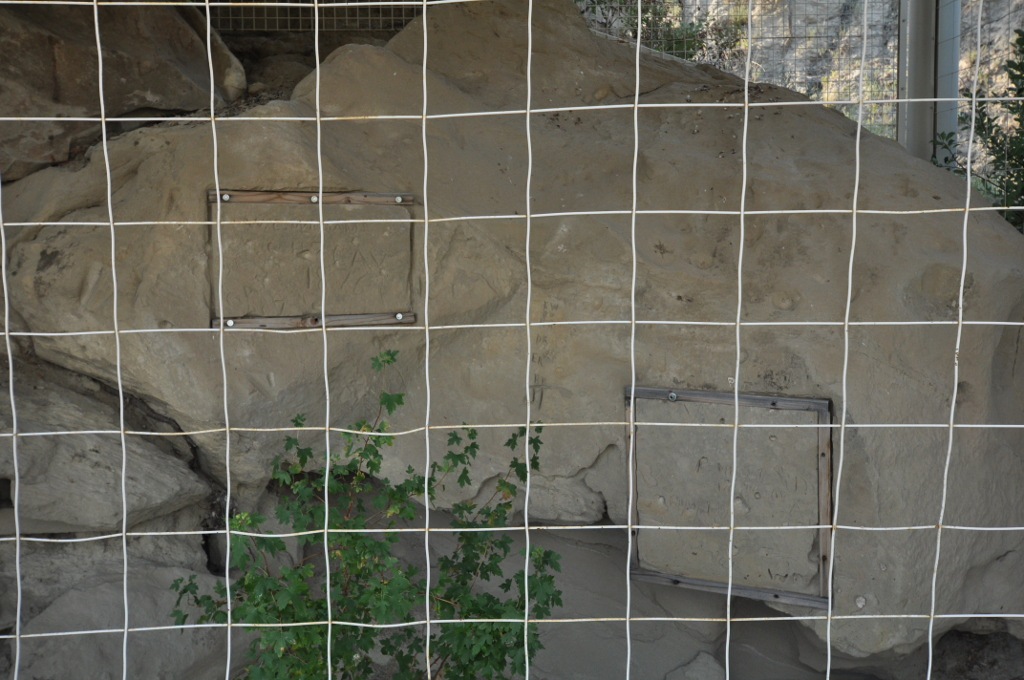

- Location within North Dakota Location within the United States
- Nearest city: Medora, North Dakota
- Coordinates: 46°48′28″N 103°24′39″W
- Area: 9.9 acres (4.0 ha)
- Built: 1876
- Part of: Custer Military Trail Historic Archaeological District (ID08001293)
- NRHP reference No.: 76002271

Significant dates
- Added to NRHP: November 7, 1976
- Designated CP: June 5, 2009

Initial Rock, also known as Name Rock, in the Medora Ranger District of the Little Missouri National Grassland, near Medora, North Dakota, was listed on the National Register of Historic Places (NRHP) in 1976. It was the site of an overnight camp on May 28, 1876 of George Armstrong Custer's men, on their way to the Battle of Little Big Horn, which happened on June 25, 1876. The NRHP listing included one contributing site and one contributing object on 9.9 acres (4.0 ha).

Two soldiers, W.C. Williams and F. Neely, carved their names in a rock still present at the site. Williams and Neely, under the command of Marcus Reno, survived the battle.

A shelter over the rock has prevented further weathering and vandalism since 1966.

It is one of five sites that are included in Custer Military Trail Historic Archaeological District, which is a large historic district that was listed on the NRHP in 2009. These sites are documented as part of a driving tour through the region.

== See also ==
- List of individual rocks
