= List of highways numbered 67 =

The following highways are numbered 67:

== Australia ==
- Fitzroy Developmental Road – Queensland State Route 67

== Canada ==
- Alberta Highway 67 (former)
- Manitoba Highway 67
- Highway 67 (Ontario)

== Finland ==
- Finnish national road 67

== Germany ==
- Bundesautobahn 67

== Greece ==
- EO67 road

== India ==
- National Highway 67 (India)

== Korea, South ==
- National Route 67
- Gukjido 67

== Israel ==
- Highway 67

== New Zealand ==
- New Zealand State Highway 67
  - New Zealand State Highway 67A

== Philippines ==
- N67 highway (Philippines)

== United Kingdom ==
- British A67
- British M67

== United States ==
- Interstate 67 (former proposal)
  - Interstate 67 (Indiana–Michigan) (former proposal)
  - Interstate 67 (Michigan) (former proposal)
- U.S. Route 67
- Alabama State Route 67
  - County Route 67 (Lee County, Alabama)
- Arizona State Route 67
- California State Route 67
- Colorado State Highway 67
- Connecticut Route 67
- Florida State Road 67 (former)
  - County Road 67 (Franklin County, Florida)
    - County Road 67A (Franklin County, Florida)
  - County Road 67 (Liberty County, Florida)
    - County Road 67A (Liberty County, Florida)
- Georgia State Route 67
- Idaho State Highway 67
- Illinois Route 67 (former)
- Indiana State Road 67
- K-67 (Kansas highway)
- Kentucky Route 67
- Louisiana Highway 67
  - Louisiana State Route 67 (former)
- Maryland Route 67
  - Maryland Route 67A
  - Maryland Route 67B
  - Maryland Route 67C
  - Maryland Route 67D
  - Maryland Route 67E
  - Maryland Route 67F
- Massachusetts Route 67
- M-67 (Michigan highway)
- Minnesota State Highway 67
- Mississippi Highway 67
- Missouri Route 67 (1922) (former)
- Nebraska Highway 67
  - Nebraska Link 67E
  - Nebraska Spur 67A
  - Nebraska Spur 67B
  - Nebraska Spur 67C
  - Nebraska Recreation Road 67D
- New Jersey Route 67
  - County Route 67 (Bergen County, New Jersey)
- New York State Route 67
  - County Route 67 (Cattaraugus County, New York)
  - County Route 67 (Cayuga County, New York)
  - County Route 67 (Chautauqua County, New York)
  - County Route 67 (Delaware County, New York)
  - County Route 67 (Dutchess County, New York)
    - County Route 67A (Dutchess County, New York)
  - County Route 67 (Erie County, New York)
  - County Route 67 (Greene County, New York)
    - County Route 67A (Greene County, New York)
  - County Route 67 (Niagara County, New York)
  - County Route 67 (Oneida County, New York)
    - County Route 67A (Oneida County, New York)
  - County Route 67 (Onondaga County, New York)
  - County Route 67 (Orange County, New York)
  - County Route 67 (Putnam County, New York)
  - County Route 67 (Rensselaer County, New York)
  - County Route 67 (Rockland County, New York)
  - County Route 67 (Steuben County, New York)
  - County Route 67 (Suffolk County, New York)
    - County Route 67A (Suffolk County, New York)
  - County Route 67 (Washington County, New York)
- North Carolina Highway 67
- North Dakota Highway 67
- Ohio State Route 67
- Oklahoma State Highway 67
- Pennsylvania Route 67 (former)
- South Carolina Highway 67
- Tennessee State Route 67
- Texas State Highway 67
  - Texas State Highway Loop 67 (former)
  - Texas State Highway Spur 67
  - Farm to Market Road 67
  - Texas Park Road 67
- Utah State Route 67
- Vermont Route 67
  - Vermont Route 67A
- Virginia State Route 67
- West Virginia Route 67
- Wisconsin Highway 67

== See also ==
- A67 (disambiguation)

Preceded by 66	Lists of highways 67	Succeeded by 68
