= Original Slope County Courthouse =

- Formerly listed on the U.S. National Register of Historic Places
- Location within North Dakota Location within the United States
- Location: 2nd St., Amidon, North Dakota
- Coordinates: 46°28′54″N 103°19′19″W
- Area: >1 acre
- MPS: North Dakota County Courthouses TR
- NRHP reference No.: 85002994

Significant dates
- Added to NRHP: November 14, 1985
- Removed from NRHP: April 3, 2015

The Original Slope County Courthouse is a historic courthouse in Amidon, North Dakota, United States. The courthouse, which became a courthouse in 1915, was the first courthouse in Slope County. The building served as a temporary courthouse; extant temporary courthouses are highly unusual, as most had poor construction and did not last to the present day. The Slope County building had many other uses, though, which were largely responsible for its survival. The building was a church before it became a courthouse; after the courthouse moved out, the building held a school and two other churches before becoming a senior center in 1979.

The courthouse was added to the National Register of Historic Places on November 14, 1985.

Noting that a building may be so far "remodeled so they no longer closely resemble the style during their period of historical significance", North Dakota's State Historic Preservation Board was to meet in January 2015 to consider delisting the property.

It was in fact removed from the National Register due to numerous modifications on April 3, 2015.
