= Bowman County High School =

Coordinates: 46°10′52″N 103°24′27″W

Location
- 102 8th Ave SW; Bowman, North Dakota; United States

Information
- Type: Public
- School district: Bowman County School District
- Superintendent: Tony Duletski
- Principal: Tyler Senn
- Teaching staff: 18.34 (FTE)
- Grades: 7–12
- Enrollment: 235 (2023–2024)
- Student to teacher ratio: 12.81
- Colors: Maroon and white
- Song: On Wisconsin
- Mascot: Bulldog
- Website: www.bowman.k12.nd.us/page/junior-high-and-high-school

Bowman County High School is a public high school located in Bowman, North Dakota. A part of Bowman County School District. As of 2007, it serves about 150 students. The athletic teams are known as the Bowman County Bulldogs. In 2006, Bowman High School combined with nearby Rhame High School to form the current Bowman County High School.

It serves Bowman and Rhame.

== Athletics ==
In 2005 the number of wrestlers on the wrestling team was down to seven, making wrestling the most severely affected of the sports due to a population decline at the high school, which was among a trend of decline in rural North Dakota schools.

=== State championships ===
As Bowman High School:

- Girls' cross country - 1979, 1980, 1981, 1982, 1983, 1984, 1985, 1986, 1987, 1988, 1989, 1990, 1992, 1993, 1994, 1995, 1996, 1997, 1998, 1999, 2000, 2001, 2003, 2004, 2005, 2023
- Boys' cross country - 1909, 1980, 1981, 1982, 1983, 1984, 1987, 1989, 1990, 1992, 1993, 1994, 1995, 1999, 2000, 2020, 2021, 2022, 2023
- Girls' track and field - 1977, 1978, 1979, 1980, 1982, 1990
- Boys' track and field - 1976, 1977, 1978, 1991, 1993
- Girls' Class B basketball - 1992

As Bowman County:

- Girls' track and field - 2008, 2024
- Boys' track and field - 2024
