= Rainy Butte =

Coordinates: 46.4803°N 103.0321°W

Rainy Butte is a summit in Slope County, North Dakota, in the United States. With an elevation of 2,913 feet (888 m), Rainy Butte is the 33rd highest summit in the state of North Dakota.

Rainy Butte was so named on account of fog frequently occurring at its peak.
