= New England Public Schools =

School district in North Dakota, United States

New England Public School District No. 9, also known as New England Public Schools (NEPS), is a school district headquartered in New England, North Dakota. It includes New England High School.

It serves New England in Hettinger County, and it also includes sections of Adams, Slope, and Stark counties.

In 1985 the high school had 85 students. This means the students had low student teacher ratios, allowing for teachers to give attention to individuals.

== History ==
Noel Lunde served as superintendent. He resigned during the 2005–2006 school year, with him leaving at the end of the school year.

In 2020 the Central Elementary Public School District 32 dissolved, and was divided between Bowman County School District No. 1 and NEPS.

== Athletics and extracurricular activities ==
In 1985 Kim Maixner of the Bismarck Tribune wrote that the institution "has prided itself on its strong athletic department for many years."

Future Farmers of America, Future Homemakers of America, and National Honors Society have chapters in New England High as of 1985.

=== High School Football ===
The now-defunct New England High School football program won four North Dakota High School Activities Association 9-man state championships from 1988 to 1997 before the team dissolved in 2006 due to low participation numbers.

The cooperative team of New England-Regent-New England St. Mary's won the 1988 state championship over Hope-Page-Clifford-Galesburg by a score of 36–33. The game, nicknamed the "Hyphen Bowl" in North Dakota, was featured in the 1989 Christian Science Monitor story, "`Hyphen Bowl' a Barometer of Rural Decline".

New England-Regent then won the first of three consecutive championships in 1995. The Tigers defeated Thompson 21–14 for the 1995 championship, followed that up with a 23–6 win over Hillsboro in 1996, and then defeated Rolette-Wolford 16–14 for the 1997 title. Those teams compiled a 47-game win streak that was the longest 9-man football winning streak in the United States until Stephen-Argyle (Minnesota) surpassed it in 2007. The Tigers' winning streak began with a 42–14 victory over Harding County, S.D., on August 25, 1995, and didn't end until Divide County defeated an injury-riddled New England-Regent team 16–6 on its home field in the 9-man state semifinals on November 6, 1998. Divide County would go on to win the state championship. The 1996 team was named "Male Team of the Year" by the North Dakota Associated Press Sportscasters and Sportswriters Association. New England-Regent football teams never lost a game in the Fargodome. Between 1992 and 1999, New England-Regent teams combined to win 57 consecutive regular-season games. That steak, ironically, began after a loss to Elgin on September 11, 1992, and ended September 3, 1999, with a loss to Elgin-New Leipzig.

The 1992 through 1998 seasons represented the absolute golden era of New England-Regent Tigers football under Mike Schatz, defined by a 77–4 overall record (.951 winning percentage). In 1995 and 1996 alone, New England-Regent outscored opponents by a combined margin of 1,085 to 160, averaging over 45 points per game while allowing under 7 points per game.

Regent exited the cooperative agreement in 2000 to form a new cooperative agreement, and eventually a new high school, with neighboring Mott.

Mike Schatz, the coach of all four championship teams, erected a sign on his land outside of New England in 2016 to celebrate the city's football success. Schatz was inducted into the North Dakota High School Coaches Association Hall of Fame in 2010. In his career, he compiled 203 wins and 53 losses, and was named 9-man coach of the year three times. He also coached New England to a state runner-up finish in 1985.

Facing the possibility of not having enough male students to continue fielding its own team, New England formed a football cooperative agreement in 2006 with neighboring Dickinson Trinity, but exited that agreement in 2016 to form a new cooperative with Mott-Regent in 2017. They began playing as part of the Mott-Regent-New England Wildfire. In 2014, the New England Booster Club began efforts to revive football in the community by starting a youth program. They began playing teams from communities across the southwest North Dakota region. Beginning in 2022, the Mott-Regent-New England co-op was renamed and the high school and junior high football teams became the Hettinger County Huskies.
