= Rhame, North Dakota =

- City
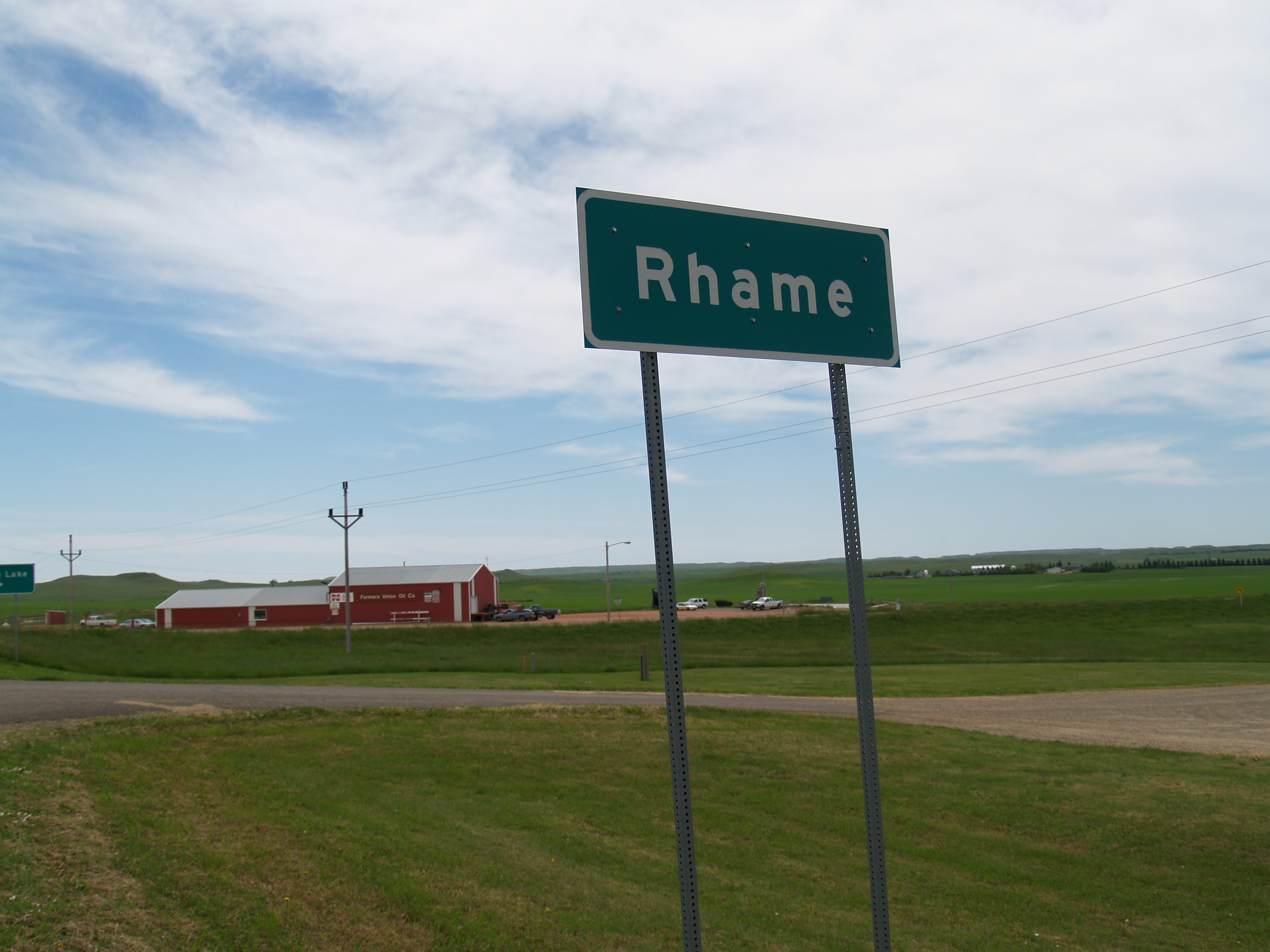

- Location of Rhame, North Dakota
- Coordinates: 46°14′05″N 103°39′18″W
- Country: United States
- State: North Dakota
- County: Bowman
- Founded: 1908
- Incorporated (village): 1913
- Incorporated (city): 1967
- Named for: Mitchell D. Rhame

Area
  - Total: 1.49 sq mi (3.87 km^{2})
  - Land: 1.49 sq mi (3.87 km^{2})
  - Water: 0 sq mi (0.00 km^{2})
- Elevation: 3,209 ft (978 m)

Population (2020)
  - Total: 158
  - Estimate (2022): 155
  - Density: 106/sq mi (40.8/km^{2})
- Time zone: UTC-7 (Mountain (MST))
  - Summer (DST): UTC-6 (MDT)
- ZIP code: 58651
- Area code: 701
- FIPS code: 38-66300
- GNIS feature ID: 1036237
- Website: www.rhame-nd.com

Rhame (/reɪm/, RAYM) is a city in Bowman County, North Dakota, United States. The population was 158 at the 2020 census. Rhame was founded in 1908.

== History ==
Bank of Rhame, Rhame, 1987

Rhame was founded in 1908 as Petrel, North Dakota, when the Chicago, Milwaukee, St. Paul and Pacific Railroad, the "Milwaukee Road," established a station here. The post office was established February 8, 1908, but was changed to Rhame in June 1908, since Petrel was already in use for a railroad station in neighboring Adams County. The city and surrounding Rhame Township were named for Mitchell Davison Rhame (1846 – 1913), who was a district engineer for the railroad.

Rhame incorporated as a village in 1913. It became a city in 1967 after the North Dakota Legislature eliminated incorporation titles for villages and towns. As a result, all incorporated municipalities in North Dakota automatically adopted a city form of government.

Rhame had a weekly newspaper from 1908 through 1953: Rhame Review (1908-1918), Farmers Review (1918-1920), Rhame Review (1920-1953). The editor beginning in 1918 was Alfred D. Fuller, a person born Hattie Fuller who then identified as a man after moving to Chicago as a young woman.

== Education ==
Rhame was home to Rhame High School until 2006 when it consolidated with nearby Bowman High School to form Bowman County High School which is located in Bowman, North Dakota. Rhame is still home to Rhame Elementary School.

The 1956 novel Prairie Schoolma'am by Emily E. Sloan was set in Rhame.

== Geography ==
According to the United States Census Bureau, the city has a total area of 1.51 square miles (3.91 km^{2}), all land. The city's elevation of 3,192 feet (973 m) makes it the highest town in North Dakota.

== Demographics ==
Historical population
| Census | Pop. | Note | %± |
|---|---|---|---|
| 1920 | 302 | | — |
| 1930 | 356 | | 17.9% |
| 1940 | 283 | | −20.5% |
| 1950 | 340 | | 20.1% |
| 1960 | 254 | | −25.3% |
| 1970 | 206 | | −18.9% |
| 1980 | 222 | | 7.8% |
| 1990 | 186 | | −16.2% |
| 2000 | 189 | | 1.6% |
| 2010 | 169 | | −10.6% |
| 2020 | 158 | | −6.5% |
| 2022 (est.) | 155 | | −1.9% |
U.S. Decennial Census; 2020 Census

=== 2010 census ===
As of the census of 2010, there were 169 people, 81 households, and 43 families living in the city. The population density was 111.9 inhabitants per square mile (43.2/km^{2}). There were 107 housing units at an average density of 70.9 per square mile (27.4/km^{2}). The racial makeup of the city was 98.2% White and 1.8% from two or more races.

There were 81 households, of which 18.5% had children under the age of 18 living with them, 50.6% were married couples living together, 2.5% had a male householder with no wife present, and 46.9% were non-families. 35.8% of all households were made up of individuals, and 17.2% had someone living alone who was 65 years of age or older. The average household size was 2.09 and the average family size was 2.81.

The median age in the city was 45.5 years. 18.9% of residents were under the age of 18; 8.3% were between the ages of 18 and 24; 21.8% were from 25 to 44; 35.5% were from 45 to 64; and 15.4% were 65 years of age or older. The gender makeup of the city was 52.7% male and 47.3% female.

=== 2000 census ===
As of the census of 2000, there were 189 people, 86 households, and 47 families living in the city. The population density was 125.9 inhabitants per square mile (48.6/km^{2}). There were 117 housing units at an average density of 77.9 per square mile (30.1/km^{2}). The racial makeup of the city was 98.41% White, and 1.59% from two or more races.

There were 86 households, out of which 31.4% had children under the age of 18 living with them, 50.0% were married couples living together, 4.7% had a female householder with no husband present, and 44.2% were non-families. 36.0% of all households were made up of individuals, and 22.1% had someone living alone who was 65 years of age or older. The average household size was 2.20 and the average family size was 2.98.

In the city, the population was spread out, with 23.8% under the age of 18, 7.9% from 18 to 24, 30.2% from 25 to 44, 19.0% from 45 to 64, and 19.0% who were 65 years of age or older. The median age was 40 years. For every 100 females, there were 92.9 males. For every 100 females age 18 and over, there were 105.7 males.

The median income for a household in the city was $20,375, and the median income for a family was $31,875. Males had a median income of $22,000 versus $13,542 for females. The per capita income for the city was $11,302. About 5.6% of families and 18.6% of the population were below the poverty line, including 13.6% of those under the age of eighteen and 56.5% of those 65 or over.

== Education ==
It is within Bowman County School District 1, which operates Rhame School (K-6) and sends secondary students from Rhame to Bowman County High School.
