= White Butte (North Dakota) =

Highest mountain of North Dakota

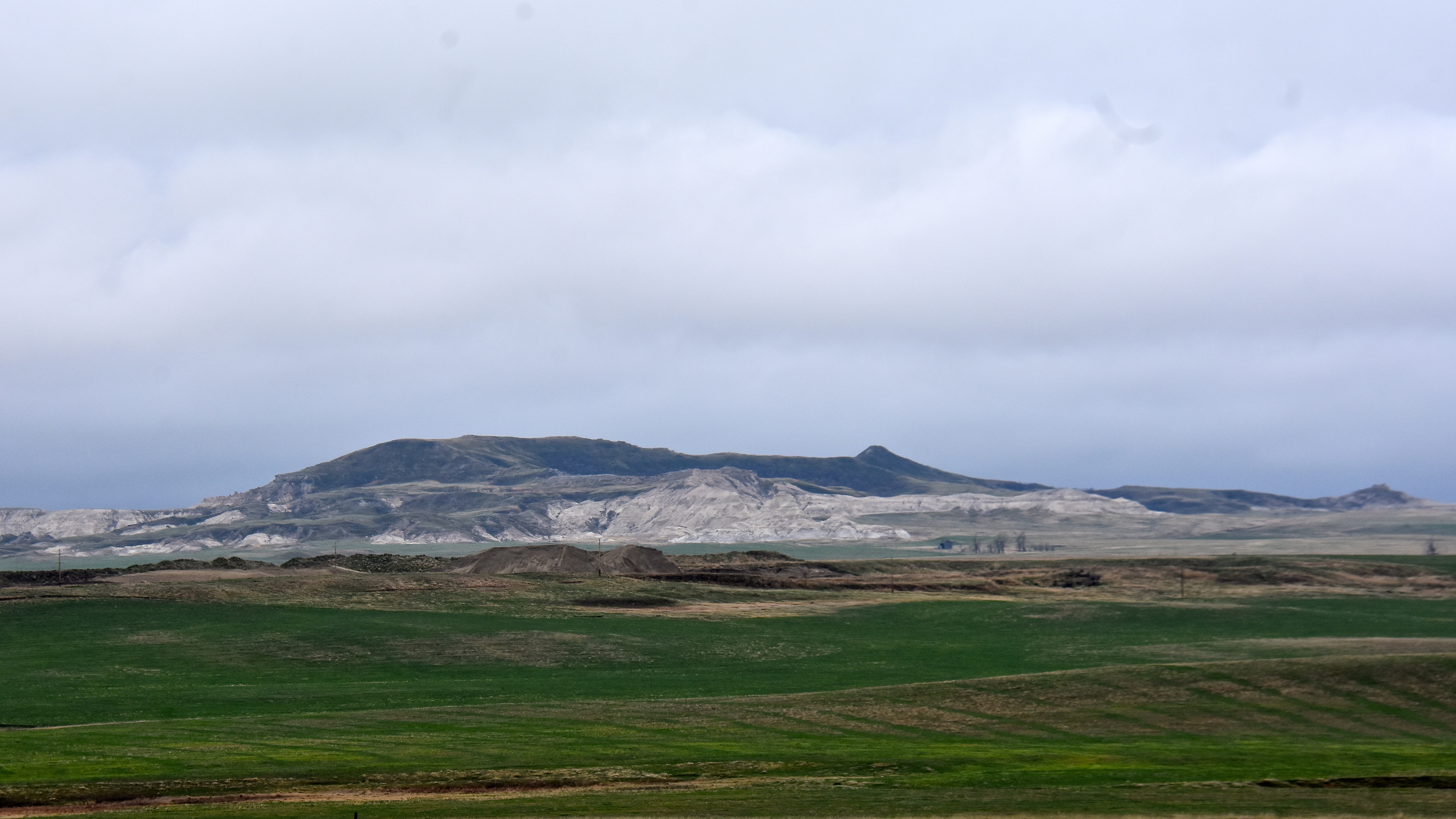
- White Butte, the highest point in North Dakota, viewed from 140th Avenue SW, May 2018.

Highest point
- Elevation: 3,508 ft (1,069 m) NAVD 88
- Prominence: 546 ft (166 m)
- Listing: U.S. state high point 30th
- Coordinates: 46°23′12″N 103°18′09″W

Geography
- Location within North Dakota Location within the United States
- Location: Slope County, North Dakota, U.S.
- Topo map: USGS Amidon

Climbing
- Easiest route: Hike (cattle trail)

White Butte (Cheyenne: Vó'omévóse) is the highest natural point in the U.S. state of North Dakota. At an elevation of 3,506 ft (1,069 m), it is a prominent butte in Slope County, in the Badlands of the southwestern part of the state. It is located 3 miles (5 kilometers) east of U.S. 85 and about 6.5 mi (10 km) south of Amidon.

The nearest town is Amidon, about seven miles to the northwest. The summit is located within the boundaries of the Little Missouri National Grassland and is about 35 miles (56 km) south of Theodore Roosevelt National Park. It is on private property, owned by the Dennis family who live nearby. At the parking area, one mile due north of the trailhead, the family maintains a small mailbox-like receptacle for donations to help maintain the area, and requests a $5 contribution from visitors. From the trailhead, the trail itself is a 4-mile round trip.

The Killdeer Mountains, 75 miles (121 km) to the north, rise roughly 1,000 feet (300 m) from their foothills, but are 225 feet (69 m) shorter than White Butte.

Looking to the west from the trail.

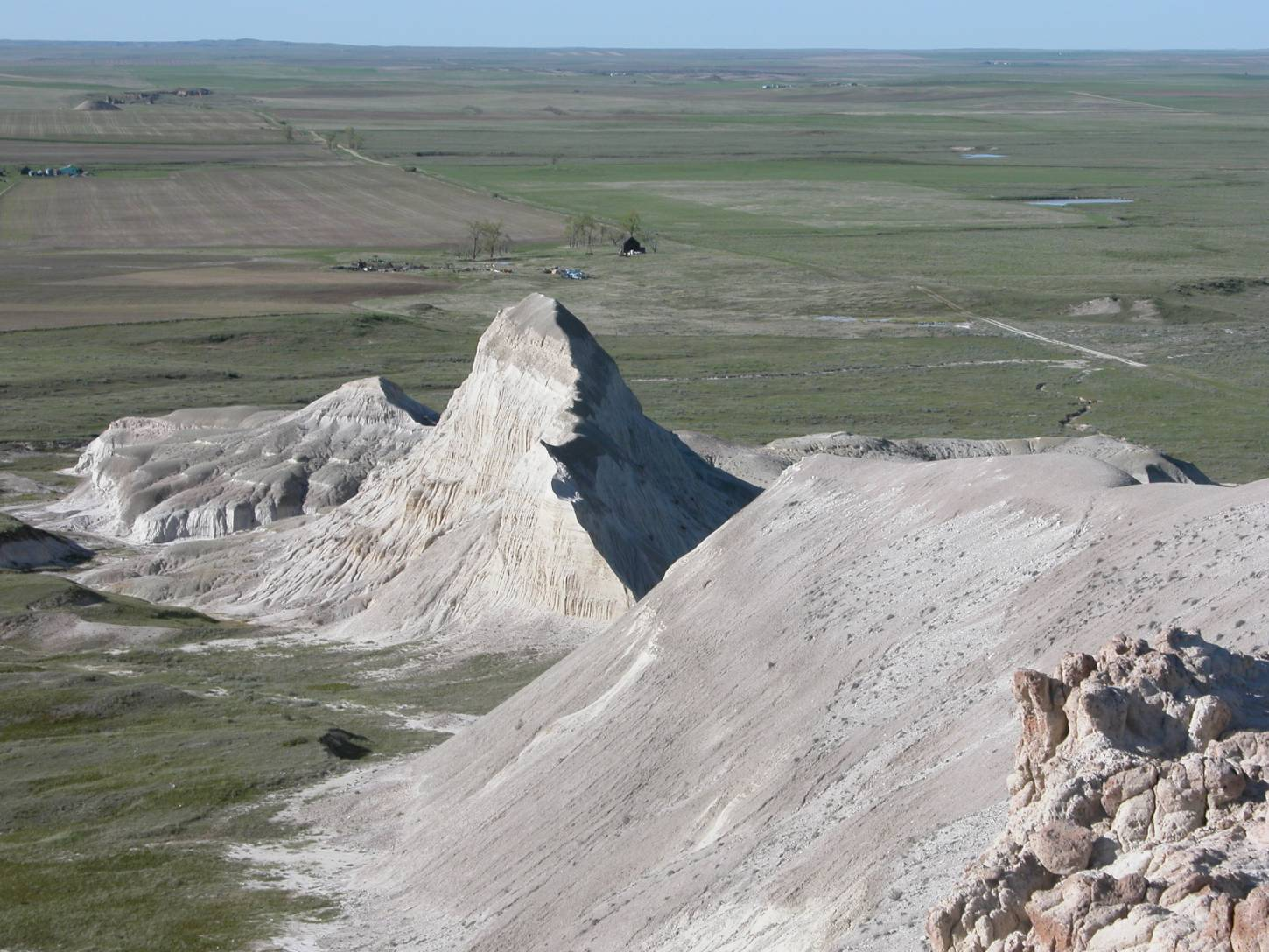
A view of the shark fin rock from the top of the butte.

== See also ==
- Outline of North Dakota
- Index of North Dakota-related articles
- List of U.S. states by elevation
