= Climate of Grand Forks, North Dakota =

Grand Forks

Climate chart (precipitation, max. and min. temperature)
J	F	M	A	M	J	J	A	S	O	N	D
0.8 15 −4	0.6 22 4	0.9 34 17	1.2 53 31	2.1 69 44	3 77 54	2.9 81 58	2.9 80 56	2 69 45	1.6 55 34	0.9 33 18	0.6 19 3
- █ Average max. and min. temperatures in °F
- █ Precipitation totals in inches
- Source: NOAA
Metric conversion
J	F	M	A	M	J	J	A	S	O	N	D
20 −10 −20	16 −5 −16	23 1 −8	30 12 −1	54 21 7	76 25 12	73 27 14	74 27 13	50 20 7	40 13 1	22 1 −8	15 −7 −16
- █ Average max. and min. temperatures in °C
- █ Precipitation totals in mm

The Climate of Grand Forks, North Dakota is a warm summer continental (Köppen Dfb) typical of cities located in the Great Plains, with four very distinct seasons and great variation in temperatures over very short periods of time. The city's climate is characterized by long, cold winters with moderate snowfall and warm summers which are typically humid.

== Temperature ==
Grand Forks lies in the middle of the North American continent on low-lying, flat land. Since it is located in the Great Plains, it has an extreme continental climate, in that there are great differences between summer and winter temperatures. As there are no nearby mountain ranges or bodies of water to ameliorate the winter climatic conditions, Grand Forks lies exposed to numerous weather systems including bitterly cold Arctic high pressure systems. Additionally, it resides in Lake Agassiz, putting it at an elevation of approximately 240 meters (800 feet) which is lower than the surrounding area, allowing denser cold air masses to settle and linger in the area. This can result in bone-chilling temperatures as early as the end of October, followed by bitter cold temperatures and readings during December, January and February. During these three months, the high reaches freezing on only 18 days, and the low falls below 0 °F (−17.8 °C) for 50 days per year. Cold weather and snow will occasionally extend into April, although in general the winter weather begins to moderate in late February or early March. The lowest temperature ever recorded was −43 °F (−42 °C), most recently on January 30, 2004.

Summers are typically warm with varying degrees of humidity. Depending on the year, warm weather can continue beyond to October, or come to an abrupt end soon after Labor Day. The city often receives an Indian Summer, when summer weather returns briefly after the first frosts, in mid to late October, or even early November. The highest temperature ever recorded in Grand Forks was 109 °F (43 °C) on July 6, 1936.

== Precipitation ==
The wettest month is June and the driest is December, and precipitation is concentrated from May to September. There is generally snow cover from mid-November to the end of March, though this varies depending on the year—heavy snowfalls in late October and in April are not uncommon. The city averages 37.2 inches (94 cm) of snow per season.

== Statistics ==
Climate data for Grand Forks International Airport, North Dakota (1991–2020 normals, extremes 1893–present)
Month	Jan	Feb	Mar	Apr	May	Jun	Jul	Aug	Sep	Oct	Nov	Dec	Year
Record high °F (°C)	52 (11)	67 (19)	83 (28)	100 (38)	105 (41)	105 (41)	109 (43)	104 (40)	103 (39)	95 (35)	75 (24)	58 (14)	109 (43)
Mean maximum °F (°C)	39.1 (3.9)	40.3 (4.6)	54.2 (12.3)	75.6 (24.2)	86.6 (30.3)	91.2 (32.9)	91.5 (33.1)	92.2 (33.4)	89.4 (31.9)	77.4 (25.2)	57.1 (13.9)	40.3 (4.6)	95.1 (35.1)
Mean daily maximum °F (°C)	15.8 (−9.0)	20.5 (−6.4)	33.9 (1.1)	52.0 (11.1)	66.9 (19.4)	76.4 (24.7)	80.7 (27.1)	79.8 (26.6)	70.4 (21.3)	53.9 (12.2)	35.7 (2.1)	21.4 (−5.9)	50.6 (10.3)
Daily mean °F (°C)	6.3 (−14.3)	10.6 (−11.9)	24.4 (−4.2)	40.7 (4.8)	54.1 (12.3)	64.6 (18.1)	68.9 (20.5)	67.0 (19.4)	57.9 (14.4)	43.2 (6.2)	26.7 (−2.9)	12.8 (−10.7)	39.8 (4.3)
Mean daily minimum °F (°C)	−3.1 (−19.5)	0.7 (−17.4)	15.0 (−9.4)	29.3 (−1.5)	41.4 (5.2)	52.9 (11.6)	57.0 (13.9)	54.3 (12.4)	45.3 (7.4)	32.5 (0.3)	17.8 (−7.9)	4.2 (−15.4)	28.9 (−1.7)
Mean minimum °F (°C)	−26.1 (−32.3)	−21.6 (−29.8)	−10.3 (−23.5)	14.0 (−10.0)	27.0 (−2.8)	40.9 (4.9)	46.3 (7.9)	42.9 (6.1)	31.0 (−0.6)	17.3 (−8.2)	−1.5 (−18.6)	−18.1 (−27.8)	−28.9 (−33.8)
Record low °F (°C)	−43 (−42)	−42 (−41)	−36 (−38)	−9 (−23)	5 (−15)	28 (−2)	30 (−1)	30 (−1)	11 (−12)	−9 (−23)	−35 (−37)	−37 (−38)	−43 (−42)
Average precipitation inches (mm)	0.49 (12)	0.51 (13)	0.91 (23)	1.21 (31)	2.80 (71)	3.77 (96)	3.52 (89)	2.81 (71)	2.26 (57)	1.88 (48)	0.92 (23)	0.66 (17)	21.74 (552)
Average snowfall inches (cm)	9.9 (25)	7.1 (18)	7.4 (19)	3.5 (8.9)	0.0 (0.0)	0.0 (0.0)	0.0 (0.0)	0.0 (0.0)	0.0 (0.0)	1.6 (4.1)	6.6 (17)	12.3 (31)	48.4 (123)
Average extreme snow depth inches (cm)	11.3 (29)	11.6 (29)	10.9 (28)	2.7 (6.9)	0.0 (0.0)	0.0 (0.0)	0.0 (0.0)	0.0 (0.0)	0.0 (0.0)	0.6 (1.5)	3.7 (9.4)	8.3 (21)	15.1 (38)
Average precipitation days (≥ 0.01 in)	8.4	6.8	7.3	7.7	10.7	12.1	10.2	8.8	8.6	8.4	7.0	8.8	104.8
Average snowy days (≥ 0.1 in)	10.2	7.7	5.8	2.3	0.2	0.0	0.0	0.0	0.0	1.3	5.7	10.2	43.4
Source: NOAA

Climate data for Grand Forks, North Dakota (University of North Dakota) 1991–2020 normals, extremes 1893–present
Month	Jan	Feb	Mar	Apr	May	Jun	Jul	Aug	Sep	Oct	Nov	Dec	Year
Record high °F (°C)	54 (12)	67 (19)	83 (28)	98 (37)	105 (41)	105 (41)	109 (43)	104 (40)	102 (39)	95 (35)	73 (23)	58 (14)	109 (43)
Mean daily maximum °F (°C)	15.3 (−9.3)	20.9 (−6.2)	34.0 (1.1)	51.9 (11.1)	66.5 (19.2)	75.9 (24.4)	80.1 (26.7)	79.2 (26.2)	69.6 (20.9)	53.2 (11.8)	35.0 (1.7)	21.2 (−6.0)	50.2 (10.1)
Daily mean °F (°C)	7.1 (−13.8)	12.2 (−11.0)	25.4 (−3.7)	41.4 (5.2)	55.0 (12.8)	65.4 (18.6)	69.5 (20.8)	67.8 (19.9)	58.5 (14.7)	43.5 (6.4)	27.3 (−2.6)	13.6 (−10.2)	40.6 (4.8)
Mean daily minimum °F (°C)	−1 (−18)	3.4 (−15.9)	16.9 (−8.4)	31.0 (−0.6)	43.5 (6.4)	54.8 (12.7)	58.9 (14.9)	56.4 (13.6)	47.4 (8.6)	34.4 (1.3)	19.6 (−6.9)	6.0 (−14.4)	30.9 (−0.6)
Record low °F (°C)	−43 (−42)	−42 (−41)	−36 (−38)	−9 (−23)	5 (−15)	28 (−2)	36 (2)	30 (−1)	11 (−12)	−9 (−23)	−35 (−37)	−37 (−38)	−43 (−42)
Average precipitation inches (mm)	0.52 (13)	0.56 (14)	0.91 (23)	1.19 (30)	2.93 (74)	4.13 (105)	3.55 (90)	3.03 (77)	2.42 (61)	2.00 (51)	0.87 (22)	0.73 (19)	22.84 (580)
Average snowfall inches (cm)	10.6 (27)	8.0 (20)	7.8 (20)	2.7 (6.9)	0.1 (0.25)	0.0 (0.0)	0.0 (0.0)	0.0 (0.0)	0.0 (0.0)	1.5 (3.8)	5.4 (14)	13.4 (34)	49.5 (126)
Average precipitation days (≥ 0.01 in)	6.9	6.6	6.6	7.4	10.6	12.1	10.0	8.8	8.7	8.3	6.3	7.6	99.9
Average snowy days (≥ 0.1 in)	8.8	7.4	5.0	2.0	0.2	0.0	0.0	0.0	0.0	1.2	4.6	9.6	38.8
Source: NOAA
