= A67 =

A67 or A-67 may refer to:

- A67 road, a road connecting Bowes and Crathorne in England
- A67 motorway (Germany), a road connecting the A3 and the A6
- A67 motorway (Netherlands), a road connecting Eersel and Eindhoven
- A67 highway (Spain), a road connecting Santander and Palenci
- Benoni Defense, in the Encyclopaedia of Chess Openings
- US Aircraft A-67 Dragon, an American single-engine, propeller-driven, ground attack aircraft
- A former name of Pioneer Park, an amusement park in Fairbanks, Alaska
