= Climate of Bismarck, North Dakota =

Bismarck, North Dakota

Climate chart (precipitation, max. and min. temperature)
J	F	M	A	M	J	J	A	S	O	N	D
0.5 21 −1	0.5 29 8	0.9 40 19	1.5 56 31	2.2 69 43	2.6 78 52	2.6 85 56	2.2 83 55	1.6 72 44	1.3 58 32	0.7 38 18	0.4 26 5
- █ Average max. and min. temperatures in °F
- █ Precipitation totals in inches
- Source: NOAA
Metric conversion
J	F	M	A	M	J	J	A	S	O	N	D
11 −6 −18	13 −2 −13	22 5 −7	37 13 −1	56 21 6	66 25 11	66 29 14	55 29 13	41 22 7	33 15 0	18 3 −8	11 −4 −15
- █ Average max. and min. temperatures in °C
- █ Precipitation totals in mm

The climate of Bismarck in the U.S. state of North Dakota is humid continental (Köppen Dfa/Dfb), caused primarily by the combination of its mid-level latitude and location not far from the geographic centre of the U.S. Its summers are hot enough for it to border on having a Köppen Dwa classification, and precipitation is high enough for it to barely avoid being classified as semi-arid (Köppen climate classification BSk). The city's climate displays four very distinct seasons and great variation in temperatures over very short periods of time. Like other cities in the northern Great Plains, its climate is also fairly dry.

== Overview ==
Climate data for Bismarck Municipal Airport, North Dakota (1991–2020 normals, (Note: Mean monthly maxima and minima (i.e. the highest and lowest temperature readings during an entire month or year) calculated based on data at said location from 1991 to 2020.) extremes 1874–present (Note: Records for Bismarck have been kept at the Bismarck Municipal Airport since January 1948 and at an undisclosed location from October 1874 to December 1947.))
Month	Jan	Feb	Mar	Apr	May	Jun	Jul	Aug	Sep	Oct	Nov	Dec	Year
Record high °F (°C)	63 (17)	73 (23)	81 (27)	93 (34)	102 (39)	111 (44)	114 (46)	109 (43)	105 (41)	95 (35)	79 (26)	66 (19)	114 (46)
Mean maximum °F (°C)	46.7 (8.2)	49.9 (9.9)	66.7 (19.3)	80.2 (26.8)	87.1 (30.6)	93.2 (34.0)	98.3 (36.8)	98.2 (36.8)	93.0 (33.9)	82.1 (27.8)	63.9 (17.7)	49.4 (9.7)	101.4 (38.6)
Mean daily maximum °F (°C)	23.2 (−4.9)	27.8 (−2.3)	41.0 (5.0)	56.0 (13.3)	68.3 (20.2)	77.9 (25.5)	84.7 (29.3)	83.5 (28.6)	73.4 (23.0)	57.1 (13.9)	40.6 (4.8)	27.7 (−2.4)	55.1 (12.8)
Daily mean °F (°C)	12.8 (−10.7)	17.5 (−8.1)	30.1 (−1.1)	43.2 (6.2)	55.3 (12.9)	65.4 (18.6)	71.3 (21.8)	69.6 (20.9)	59.7 (15.4)	44.8 (7.1)	29.9 (−1.2)	17.9 (−7.8)	43.1 (6.2)
Mean daily minimum °F (°C)	2.4 (−16.4)	7.2 (−13.8)	19.1 (−7.2)	30.4 (−0.9)	42.4 (5.8)	52.9 (11.6)	57.9 (14.4)	55.7 (13.2)	45.9 (7.7)	32.6 (0.3)	19.1 (−7.2)	8.1 (−13.3)	31.1 (−0.5)
Mean minimum °F (°C)	−23.8 (−31.0)	−17.6 (−27.6)	−4.7 (−20.4)	13.4 (−10.3)	26.9 (−2.8)	39.7 (4.3)	46.2 (7.9)	43.3 (6.3)	29.8 (−1.2)	15.9 (−8.9)	−1.0 (−18.3)	−16.0 (−26.7)	−27.9 (−33.3)
Record low °F (°C)	−45 (−43)	−45 (−43)	−36 (−38)	−12 (−24)	13 (−11)	30 (−1)	32 (0)	32 (0)	10 (−12)	−10 (−23)	−30 (−34)	−43 (−42)	−45 (−43)
Average precipitation inches (mm)	0.48 (12)	0.52 (13)	0.84 (21)	1.34 (34)	2.50 (64)	3.36 (85)	3.07 (78)	2.50 (64)	1.72 (44)	1.43 (36)	0.69 (18)	0.60 (15)	19.05 (484)
Average snowfall inches (cm)	8.9 (23)	7.5 (19)	8.5 (22)	4.6 (12)	0.4 (1.0)	0.0 (0.0)	0.0 (0.0)	0.0 (0.0)	0.0 (0.0)	2.5 (6.4)	8.0 (20)	10.1 (26)	50.5 (128)
Average extreme snow depth inches (cm)	8.0 (20)	7.0 (18)	5.8 (15)	3.5 (8.9)	0.2 (0.51)	0.0 (0.0)	0.0 (0.0)	0.0 (0.0)	0.0 (0.0)	1.3 (3.3)	4.4 (11)	6.3 (16)	11.5 (29)
Average precipitation days (≥ 0.01 in)	7.8	7.9	7.5	8.1	10.4	11.6	9.7	8.0	7.3	7.2	6.6	7.7	99.8
Average snowy days (≥ 0.1 in)	9.9	8.7	6.3	2.7	0.4	0.0	0.0	0.0	0.0	2.5	8.0	10.1	44.6
Average relative humidity (%)	71.3	72.4	69.9	61.8	60.1	65.0	61.8	60.6	63.7	63.8	72.0	74.5	66.4
Average dew point °F (°C)	2.3 (−16.5)	8.6 (−13.0)	18.9 (−7.3)	28.6 (−1.9)	39.6 (4.2)	50.5 (10.3)	54.9 (12.7)	52.0 (11.1)	42.4 (5.8)	32.2 (0.1)	19.8 (−6.8)	7.5 (−13.6)	29.8 (−1.2)
Mean monthly sunshine hours	149.4	153.5	222.3	244.3	296.1	318.1	354.6	316.2	245.9	191.7	122.6	122.9	2,737.6
Percentage possible sunshine	53	53	60	60	64	67	74	72	65	57	43	46	61
Average ultraviolet index	0.8	1.5	2.9	4.7	6.3	7.5	7.9	6.7	4.6	2.4	1.1	0.8	3.9
Source 1: NOAA (relative humidity and sun 1961–1990)
Source 2: UV Index Today (1995 to 2022)

See or edit raw graph data.

== Temperatures ==
Temperatures in Bismarck are variable throughout most of the year, with some stability in summer due to the yearly weakening of the jet stream. Nevertheless, there are four very distinct seasons, with great temperature variation. The warmest month of the year is July, when the average high temperature is 84.5 °F (29.2 °C). Overnight low temperatures in July average 56.4 °F (13.6 °C). The coldest month of the year is January, with an average high temperature of 21.1 °F (−6.1 °C) and lows of −0.6 °F (−18.1 °C) on average.

Highs exceed 90 °F (32.2 °C) on 21 days per year, and 50 °F (10.0 °C) for only 17 days from November to March. Highs reach the freezing mark on about one-third of the days from December to February, and lows reach 0 °F (−17.8 °C) or below on 42 nights per year.

=== Extremes ===
The highest temperature ever recorded in Bismarck was 114 °F (46 °C), on July 6, 1936. The temperature has reached or exceeded 110 °F (43.3 °C) in Bismarck a total of five times in recorded weather history. Two of those occasions were in the same five-year period: 111 °F (43.9 °C) in June 2002, and 112 °F (44.4 °C) in July 2006. The coldest temperature ever recorded in Bismarck was −45 °F (−43 °C), on both January 13, 1916 and February 16, 1936.

== Precipitation ==
The climate of Bismarck tends to be dry, with yearly precipitation averaging only 16.8 inches (427 mm). The wettest month of the year on average is June, when a majority of precipitation falls as rain from thunderstorms. June averages 2.59 inches (65.8 mm) of precipitation. December is the driest month, averaging only 0.44 inches (11.2 mm), as precipitation falls as fluffy, low moisture-content snow. In the winter, Bismarck averages 49.3 inches (125 cm) of snow annually.

The 1990s were a very moist period for Bismarck. The earlier part of the decade was documented for heavy snowfall as the snowiest winter on record in Bismarck was the winter of 1996–97, when 101.6 inches (258 cm) of snow fell. The decade was noted for heavy rainfall as well as 4.63 inches (117.6 mm) of rain fell, the most rain ever received in a standard 24-hour day, on August 21, 1998. In addition, just one year later, the second highest 24-hour rainfall occurred on August 12, 1999, with 4.48 inches (113.8 mm). This wet period led into an extended drought period in the early 2000s that continued into 2006.

== Sun ==
The area averages 4 hours of daily sunshine in December. July is the sunniest month, with an average 11.4 hours of daily sunshine. The total of around 2740 hours of sunshine per year means that the area receives 62.53% of possible sunshine.
