= Amidon, North Dakota =

- City
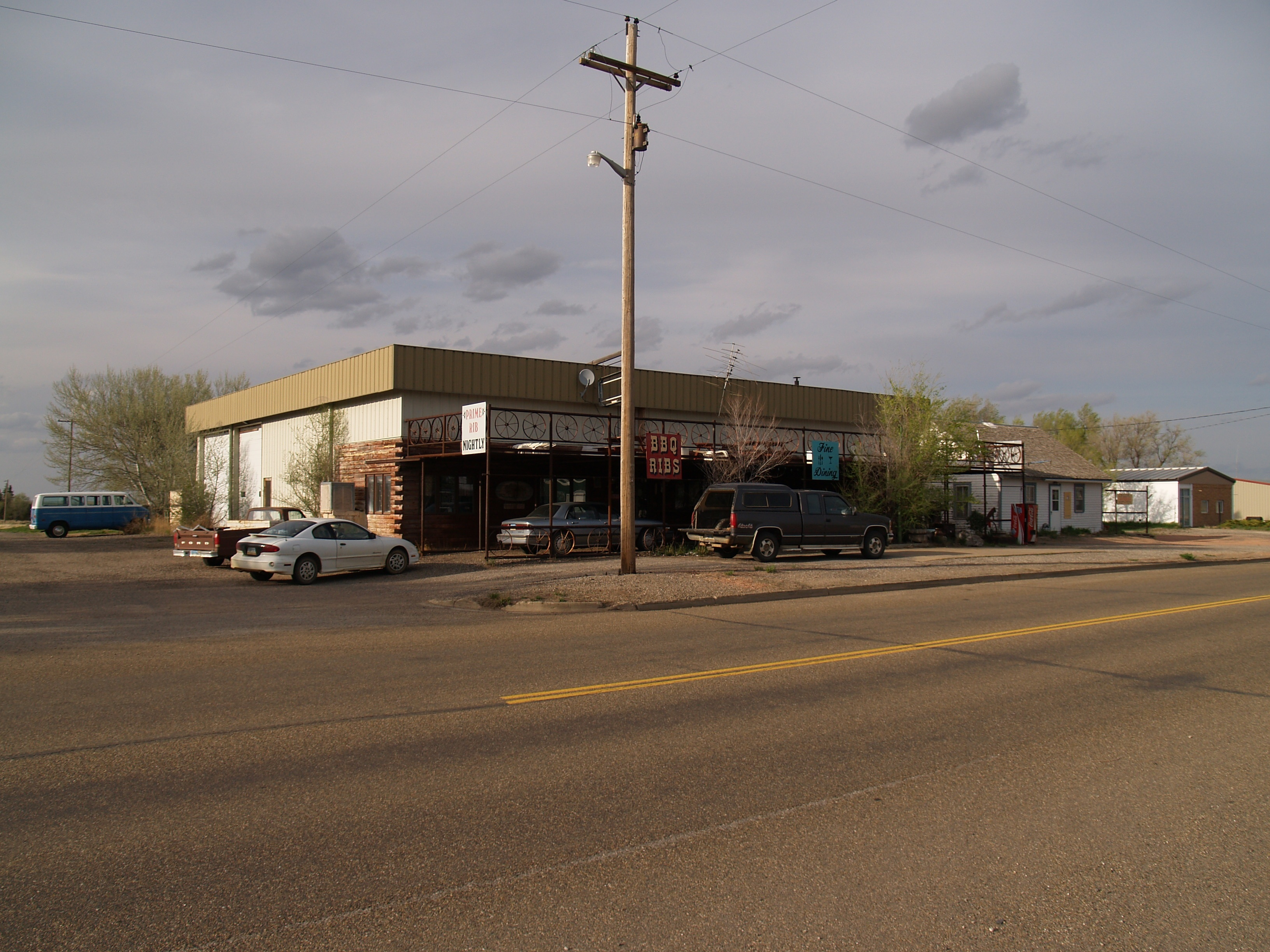
- Business district in Amidon
- Interactive map of Amidon, North Dakota
- Location within North Dakota
- Coordinates: 46.4822°N 103.3196°W
- Country: United States
- State: North Dakota
- County: Slope
- Founded: 1910
- Named for: Charles F. Amidon

Area
  - Total: 0.627 sq mi (1.624 km^{2})
  - Land: 0.627 sq mi (1.624 km^{2})
  - Water: 0 sq mi (0.000 km^{2}) 0.00%
- Elevation: 2,904 ft (885 m)

Population (2020)
  - Total: 24
  - Estimate (2025): 21
  - Density: 38/sq mi (15/km^{2})
- Time zone: UTC–7 (Mountain (MST))
  - Summer (DST): UTC–6 (MDT)
- ZIP Code: 58620
- Area code: 701
- FIPS code: 38-02060
- GNIS feature ID: 1035909

Amidon (/ˈæmɪdɒn/ AM-i-don) is a city in and the county seat of Slope County, North Dakota, United States. The population was 24 as of the 2020 census, and was estimated at 21 in 2025.

Amidon was the smallest incorporated county seat at the 2000 census. It became the second-smallest incorporated county seat after Brewster, Nebraska, with a population of 17. In 2000, Amidon had 26 people to Brewster's 29. Two other unincorporated county seats are smaller: Mentone, Texas (population 19), the county seat of Loving County, and Gann Valley, South Dakota (population 10), the county seat of Buffalo County, South Dakota.

It is located on U.S. 85 approximately 31 miles (50 km) north of Bowman, and is the closest city to White Butte.

== History ==
Amidon was founded in 1910 at the anticipated terminus of a Milwaukee Road branch line that diverged from the railroad's Pacific Extension in McLaughlin, South Dakota. The line was ultimately never built farther west of New England, North Dakota, making Amidon one of the few surviving North Dakota cities never to have been served by a rail line. The original county courthouse was built in 1915. It was also the last county seat in the state to get electricity when Slope Electric Cooperative extended their distribution lines into Amidon in 1950.

Amidon is named after Charles F. Amidon, a federal judge for the United States District Court for the District of North Dakota.

== Geography ==
According to the United States Census Bureau, the city has a total area of 0.627 square miles (1.62 km^{2}), all land.

=== Climate ===
According to the Köppen Climate Classification system, Amidon has a semi-arid climate, abbreviated "BSk" on climate maps.

Climate data for Amidon (2,904 feet above sea level)
Month	Jan	Feb	Mar	Apr	May	Jun	Jul	Aug	Sep	Oct	Nov	Dec	Year
Record high °F (°C)	64.0 (17.8)	68.0 (20.0)	81.0 (27.2)	91.0 (32.8)	98.0 (36.7)	107.0 (41.7)	108.0 (42.2)	108.0 (42.2)	105.0 (40.6)	94.0 (34.4)	81.0 (27.2)	64.0 (17.8)	108.0 (42.2)
Mean daily maximum °F (°C)	29.0 (−1.7)	34.0 (1.1)	44.0 (6.7)	57.0 (13.9)	67.0 (19.4)	77.0 (25.0)	86.0 (30.0)	86.0 (30.0)	74.0 (23.3)	59.0 (15.0)	43.0 (6.1)	31.0 (−0.6)	57.3 (14.0)
Daily mean °F (°C)	17.5 (−8.1)	22.5 (−5.3)	32.0 (0.0)	44.0 (6.7)	54.0 (12.2)	64.0 (17.8)	71.5 (21.9)	70.5 (21.4)	59.0 (15.0)	45.5 (7.5)	31.5 (−0.3)	20.0 (−6.7)	44.3 (6.8)
Mean daily minimum °F (°C)	6.0 (−14.4)	11.0 (−11.7)	20.0 (−6.7)	31.0 (−0.6)	41.0 (5.0)	51.0 (10.6)	57.0 (13.9)	55.0 (12.8)	44.0 (6.7)	32.0 (0.0)	20.0 (−6.7)	9.0 (−12.8)	31.4 (−0.3)
Record low °F (°C)	−34.0 (−36.7)	−35.0 (−37.2)	−28.0 (−33.3)	−5.0 (−20.6)	5.0 (−15.0)	30.0 (−1.1)	36.0 (2.2)	31.0 (−0.6)	17.0 (−8.3)	−8.0 (−22.2)	−26.0 (−32.2)	−40.0 (−40.0)	−40.0 (−40.0)
Average precipitation inches (mm)	0.35 (8.9)	0.31 (7.9)	0.69 (18)	0.90 (23)	2.35 (60)	2.84 (72)	2.28 (58)	1.34 (34)	1.38 (35)	1.14 (29)	0.45 (11)	0.41 (10)	14.44 (366.8)
Source: The Weather Channel

== Demographics ==
Historical population
Census	Pop.	Note	%±
1920	145		—
1930	141		−2.8%
1940	102		−27.7%
1950	82		−19.6%
1960	84		2.4%
1970	54		−35.7%
1980	43		−20.4%
1990	24		−44.2%
2000	26		8.3%
2010	20		−23.1%
2020	24		20.0%
2025 (est.)	21		−12.5%
U.S. Decennial Census; 2020 Census

=== 2020 census ===
As of the 2020 census, there were 24 people, 9 households, and 7 families residing in the city.

=== 2010 census ===
As of the 2010 census, there were 20 people, 11 households, and 7 families residing in the city. The population density was 31.3 inhabitants per square mile (12.1/km^{2}). There were 17 housing units at an average density of 26.6 per square mile (10.3/km^{2}). The racial makeup of the city was 100.0% White.

There were 11 households, of which 9.1% had children under the age of 18 living with them, 63.6% were married couples living together, and 36.4% were non-families. 36.4% of all households were made up of individuals, and 27.3% had someone living alone who was 65 years of age or older. The average household size was 1.82 and the average family size was 2.29.

The median age in the city was 64 years. 10% of residents were under the age of 18; 0.0% were between the ages of 18 and 24; 15% were from 25 to 44; 25% were from 45 to 64; and 50% were 65 years of age or older. The gender makeup of the city was 50.0% male and 50.0% female.

=== 2000 census ===
As of the 2000 census, there were 26 people, 14 households, and 9 families residing in the city. The population density was 41.2 inhabitants per square mile (15.9/km^{2}). There were 17 housing units at an average density of 26.9 per square mile (10.4/km^{2}). The racial makeup of the city was 100.00% White.

There were 14 households, out of which 14.3% had children under the age of 18 living with them, 57.1% were married couples living together, 7.1% had a female householder with no husband present, and 35.7% were non-families. 35.7% of all households were made up of individuals, and 28.6% had someone living alone who was 65 years of age or older. The average household size was 1.86 and the average family size was 2.33.

In the city, the population was spread out, with 15.4% under the age of 18, 19.2% from 25 to 44, 38.5% from 45 to 64, and 26.9% who were 65 years of age or older. The median age was 50 years. For every 100 females, there were 85.7 males. For every 100 females age 18 and over, there were 83.3 males.

The median income for a household in the city was $27,188, and the median income for a family was $31,250. Males had a median income of $36,250 versus $16,250 for females. The per capita income for the city was $18,765. None of the population and none of the families were below the poverty line.

== Education ==
Residents were within Central Elementary Public School District 32, which operated Amidon Elementary School. The district was scheduled to dissolve on July 1, 2020.
