= Slope County, North Dakota =

County in North Dakota, United States

- County
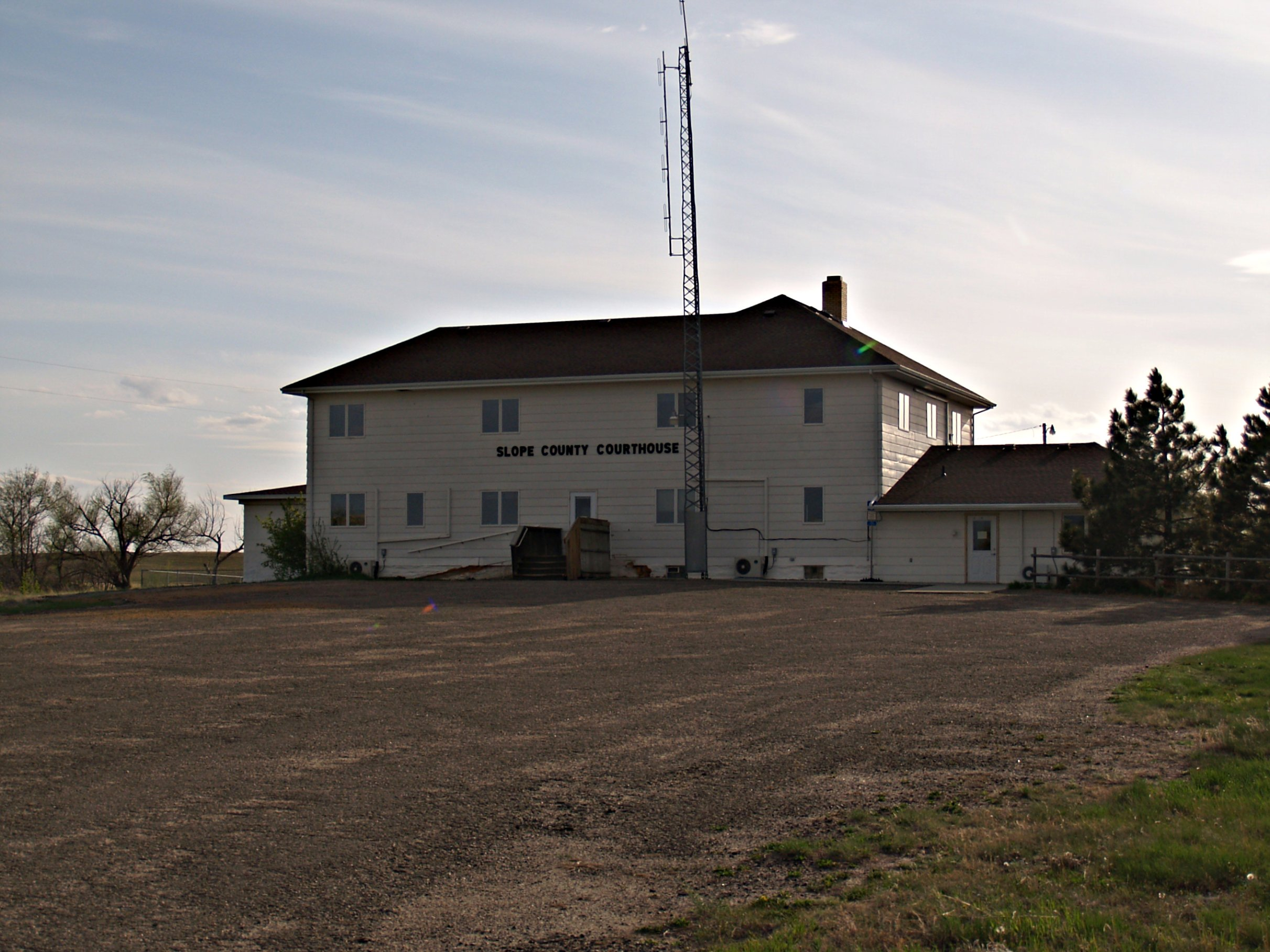
- Former Slope County Courthouse in Amidon

- Location within the U.S. state of North Dakota
- Coordinates: 46.445834°N 103.462462°W
- Country: United States
- State: North Dakota
- Founded: November 3, 1914 (created); January 14, 1915 (organized)
- Seat: Amidon
- Largest city: Marmarth

Area
  - Total: 1,219.504 sq mi (3,158.50 km^{2})
  - Land: 1,215.264 sq mi (3,147.52 km^{2})
  - Water: 4.240 sq mi (10.98 km^{2}) 0.35%

Population (2020)
  - Total: 706
  - Estimate (2025): 628 ▼
  - Density: 0.543/sq mi (0.210/km^{2})
- Time zone: UTC−7 (Mountain)
  - Summer (DST): UTC−6 (MDT)
- Area code: 701
- Congressional district: At-large
- Website: slopecountynd.gov

Slope County is a county in the U.S. state of North Dakota. As of the 2020 census, the population was 706, and was estimated to be 628 in 2025, making it the least populous county in North Dakota and the 18th-least populous county in the United States. The county seat is Amidon and the largest city is Marmarth.

== History ==
The vote to create Slope County, by partitioning the lower portion of Billings, was held on November 3, 1914. This was the final (as of 2019) alteration to that once-large Dakota county, as Bowman had been partitioned off in 1883, and Golden Valley was split off in 1910. The unorganized Slope County was not attached to another county for administrative or judicial purposes during the interregnum; on January 14, 1915, the county organization was effected. The name refers to the Missouri Slope, a geographical feature that is also a popular designation for western North Dakota, particularly the area west of the Missouri River.

== Geography ==
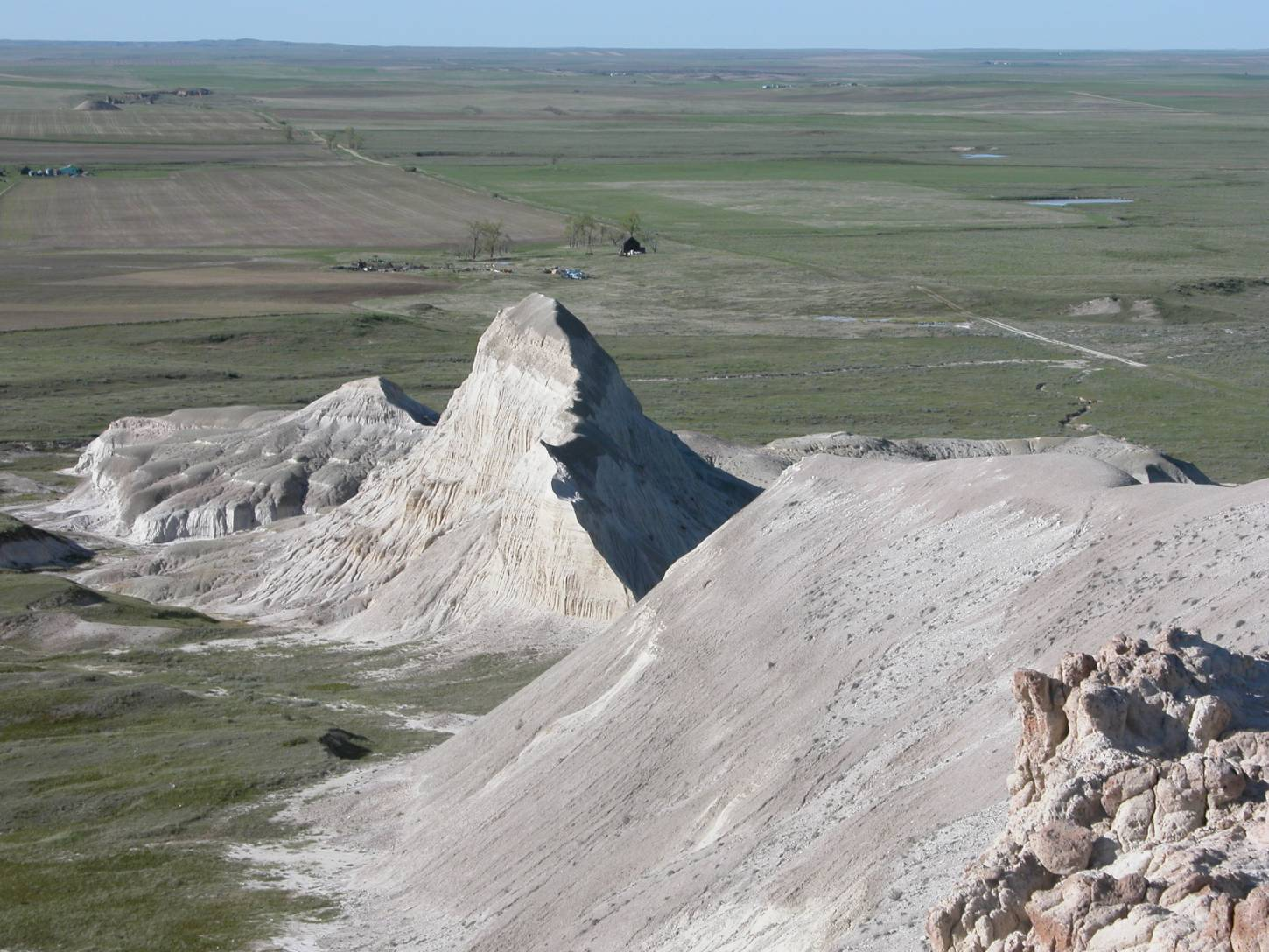
White Butte in Slope County

Slope County lies on the lower west side of North Dakota. Its west boundary line abuts the east boundary line of the state of Montana. The Little Missouri River enters the county's south boundary line from Bowman County near the Montana border and flows north until it loops very briefly into Golden Valley County. Then it flows east to near the midpoint of the north boundary of Slope County and then turns north into Billings County. Cedar Creek drains the southeastern portion of the county, flowing south into Bowman County.

The terrain slopes to the east and south; its highest area (except for isolated prominences, such as White Butte) is its northwestern corner, at 3,104 ft (946 m) ASL.

According to the United States Census Bureau, the county has a total area of 1,219.504 square miles (3,158.50 km^{2}), of which 1,215.264 square miles (3,147.52 km^{2}) is land and 4.240 square miles (10.98 km^{2}) (0.35%) is water. It is the 25th largest county in North Dakota by total area.

White Butte, the highest natural point in North Dakota at an elevation of 3,506 ft (1,069 m), is in southeast Slope County.

=== Major highways ===
- U.S. Highway 12
- U.S. Highway 85
- North Dakota Highway 21
- North Dakota Highway 67

=== National protected areas ===
- Little Missouri National Grassland (part)
- Stewart Lake National Wildlife Refuge
- White Lake National Wildlife Refuge

=== Adjacent counties ===
- Billings County - north
- Stark County - northeast
- Hettinger County - east
- Adams County - southeast
- Bowman County - south
- Fallon County, Montana - west
- Golden Valley County - northwest

== Demographics ==
Historical population
Census	Pop.	Note	%±
1920	4,940		—
1930	4,150		−16.0%
1940	2,932		−29.3%
1950	2,315		−21.0%
1960	1,893		−18.2%
1970	1,484		−21.6%
1980	1,157		−22.0%
1990	907		−21.6%
2000	767		−15.4%
2010	727		−5.2%
2020	706		−2.9%
2025 (est.)	628	▼	−11.0%
U.S. Decennial Census; 1790–1960 1900–1990; 1990–2000 2010–2020

As of the fourth quarter of 2024, the median home value in Slope County was $128,524.

As of the 2023 American Community Survey, there are 340 estimated households in Slope County with an average of 2.34 persons per household. The county has a median household income of $62,500. Approximately 14.3% of the county's population lives at or below the poverty line. Slope County has an estimated 62.4% employment rate, with 22.8% of the population holding a bachelor's degree or higher and 91.3% holding a high school diploma.

The top five reported ancestries (people were allowed to report up to two ancestries, thus the figures will generally add to more than 100%) were English (97.8%), Spanish (1.0%), Indo-European (0.0%), Asian and Pacific Islander (0.0%), and Other (1.2%).

The median age in the county was 54.2 years.

Slope County, North Dakota – racial and ethnic composition
Note: the US Census treats Hispanic/Latino as an ethnic category. This table excludes Latinos from the racial categories and assigns them to a separate category. Hispanics/Latinos may be of any race.

Race / ethnicity (NH = non-Hispanic)	Pop. 1980	Pop. 1990	Pop. 2000	Pop. 2010	Pop. 2020
White alone (NH)	1,153 (99.65%)	903 (99.56%)	764 (99.61%)	707 (97.25%)	679 (96.18%)
Black or African American alone (NH)	0 (0.00%)	0 (0.00%)	0 (0.00%)	0 (0.00%)	0 (0.00%)
Native American or Alaska Native alone (NH)	4 (0.35%)	3 (0.33%)	1 (0.13%)	6 (0.83%)	2 (0.28%)
Asian alone (NH)	0 (0.00%)	0 (0.00%)	0 (0.00%)	0 (0.00%)	0 (0.00%)
Pacific Islander alone (NH)	—	—	0 (0.00%)	0 (0.00%)	0 (0.00%)
Other race alone (NH)	0 (0.00%)	0 (0.00%)	0 (0.00%)	0 (0.00%)	0 (0.00%)
Mixed race or multiracial (NH)	—	—	1 (0.13%)	2 (0.28%)	17 (2.41%)
Hispanic or Latino (any race)	0 (0.00%)	1 (0.11%)	1 (0.13%)	12 (1.65%)	8 (1.13%)
Total	1,157 (100.00%)	907 (100.00%)	767 (100.00%)	727 (100.00%)	706 (100.00%)

=== 2024 estimate ===
As of the 2024 estimate, there were 660 people and 340 households residing in the county. The population density was 0.54 inhabitants per square mile (0.2/km^{2}). There were 410 housing units at an average density of 0.34 per square mile (0.1/km^{2}). The racial makeup of the county was 95.1% White (95.0% NH White), 1.0% African American, 3.0% Native American, 0.0% Asian, 0.0% Pacific Islander, _% from some other races and 0.9% from two or more races. Hispanic or Latino people of any race were 0.4% of the population.

=== 2020 census ===
As of the 2020 census, the county had a population of 706, with 303 households and 209 families residing in the county.

Of the residents, 21.5% were under the age of 18 and 23.9% were 65 years of age or older; the median age was 45.2 years. For every 100 females there were 105.2 males, and for every 100 females age 18 and over there were 110.6 males.

The population density was 0.36 inhabitants per square mile (0.1/km^{2}). There were 409 housing units at an average density of 0.34 per square mile (0.1/km^{2}), of which 25.9% were vacant; 82.8% of the occupied units were owner-occupied and 17.2% were renter-occupied. The homeowner vacancy rate was 0.7% and the rental vacancy rate was 5.5%.

The racial makeup of the county was 96.3% White, 0.4% African American, 0.3% American Indian and Alaska Native, 0.0% Asian, 0.0% from some other race, and 3.0% from two or more races. Hispanic or Latino residents of any race comprised 1.1% of the population.

Of the 303 households, 26.4% had children under the age of 18 living with them and 14.9% had a female householder with no spouse or partner present. About 29.7% of all households were made up of individuals and 12.9% had someone living alone who was 65 years of age or older.

=== 2010 census ===
As of the 2010 census, there were 727 people, 326 households, and 224 families residing in the county. The population density was 0.60 inhabitants per square mile (0.2/km^{2}). There were 436 housing units at an average density of 0.36 per square mile (0.1/km^{2}). The racial makeup of the county was 97.52% White, 0.00% African American, 2.20% Native American, 0.00% Asian, 0.00% Pacific Islander, 0.00% from some other races and 0.28% from two or more races. Hispanic or Latino people of any race were 1.65% of the population.

In terms of ancestry, 53.9% were of German, 30.7% Norwegian, 9.9% English, 7.4% Swedish, 5.5% Polish and 2.8% American.

There were 326 households, 22.4% had children under the age of 18 living with them, 60.7% were married couples living together, 4.9% had a female householder with no husband present, 31.3% were non-families, and 29.4% of all households were made up of individuals. The average household size was 2.23 and the average family size was 2.74. The median age was 49.2 years.

The median income for a household in the county was $43,625 and the median income for a family was $55,833. Males had a median income of $36,458 versus $31,172 for females. The per capita income for the county was $24,824. About 6.8% of families and 10.5% of the population were below the poverty line, including 9.3% of those under age 18 and 11.7% of those age 65 or over.

Slope County has the highest decline from its peak population of all US counties.

== Communities ==
=== Cities ===
- Amidon (county seat)
- Marmarth

== Politics ==
Slope County voters have traditionally voted Republican. In no national election since 1964 has the county selected the Democratic Party candidate (as of 2024). In 2024 Donald Trump received 90% of the vote in Slope County.

United States presidential election results for Slope County, North Dakota
Year	Republican		Democratic		Third party(ies)	
Year	No.	%	No.	%	No.	%
1916	516	34.84%	867	58.54%	98	6.62%
1920	1,143	76.56%	235	15.74%	115	7.70%
1924	616	39.09%	47	2.98%	913	57.93%
1928	873	60.88%	542	37.80%	19	1.32%
1932	461	27.77%	1,136	68.43%	63	3.80%
1936	331	23.29%	896	63.05%	194	13.65%
1940	801	57.58%	585	42.06%	5	0.36%
1944	434	49.43%	439	50.00%	5	0.57%
1948	447	50.51%	388	43.84%	50	5.65%
1952	682	69.38%	290	29.50%	11	1.12%
1956	433	51.98%	397	47.66%	3	0.36%
1960	475	52.43%	431	47.57%	0	0.00%
1964	329	43.01%	436	56.99%	0	0.00%
1968	379	55.57%	238	34.90%	65	9.53%
1972	413	59.86%	249	36.09%	28	4.06%
1976	355	48.90%	347	47.80%	24	3.31%
1980	462	71.41%	128	19.78%	57	8.81%
1984	419	69.26%	174	28.76%	12	1.98%
1988	315	59.43%	202	38.11%	13	2.45%
1992	226	42.24%	145	27.10%	164	30.65%
1996	260	58.43%	123	27.64%	62	13.93%
2000	316	71.49%	85	19.23%	41	9.28%
2004	335	77.55%	89	20.60%	8	1.85%
2008	297	72.26%	106	25.79%	8	1.95%
2012	341	78.03%	83	18.99%	13	2.97%
2016	362	84.19%	43	10.00%	25	5.81%
2020	380	88.99%	44	10.30%	3	0.70%
2024	351	90.23%	33	8.48%	5	1.29%

== Education ==
School districts include: - The map reflects the state before July 1, 2010, when the Central Elementary Public School District 32 dissolved.

- Bowman County School District 1
- New England Public School District 9
- Scranton Public School District 33
- Marmarth Public School District 12 (elementary only)

Former school districts:

- Central Elementary Public School District 32 (Amidon Elementary School) - Scheduled to dissolve on July 1, 2020. It was divided between Bowman County School District 1 and New England School District 9.
- Sheets Public School District 14 (Cottage School)

The Amidon and Cottage schools were the final two schools remaining in the county.

== Gallery ==
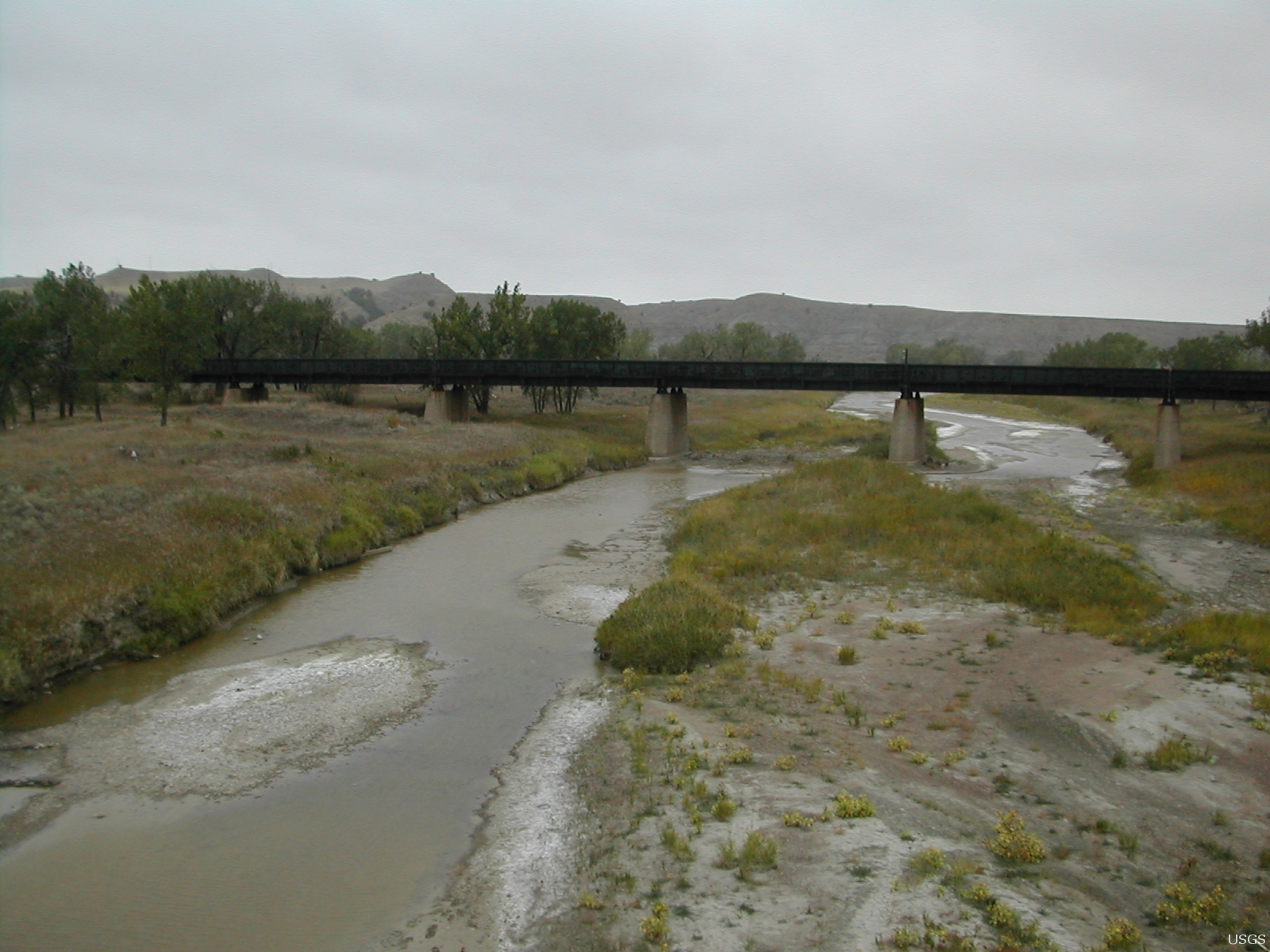
US Highway 12 bridge over the Little Missouri River

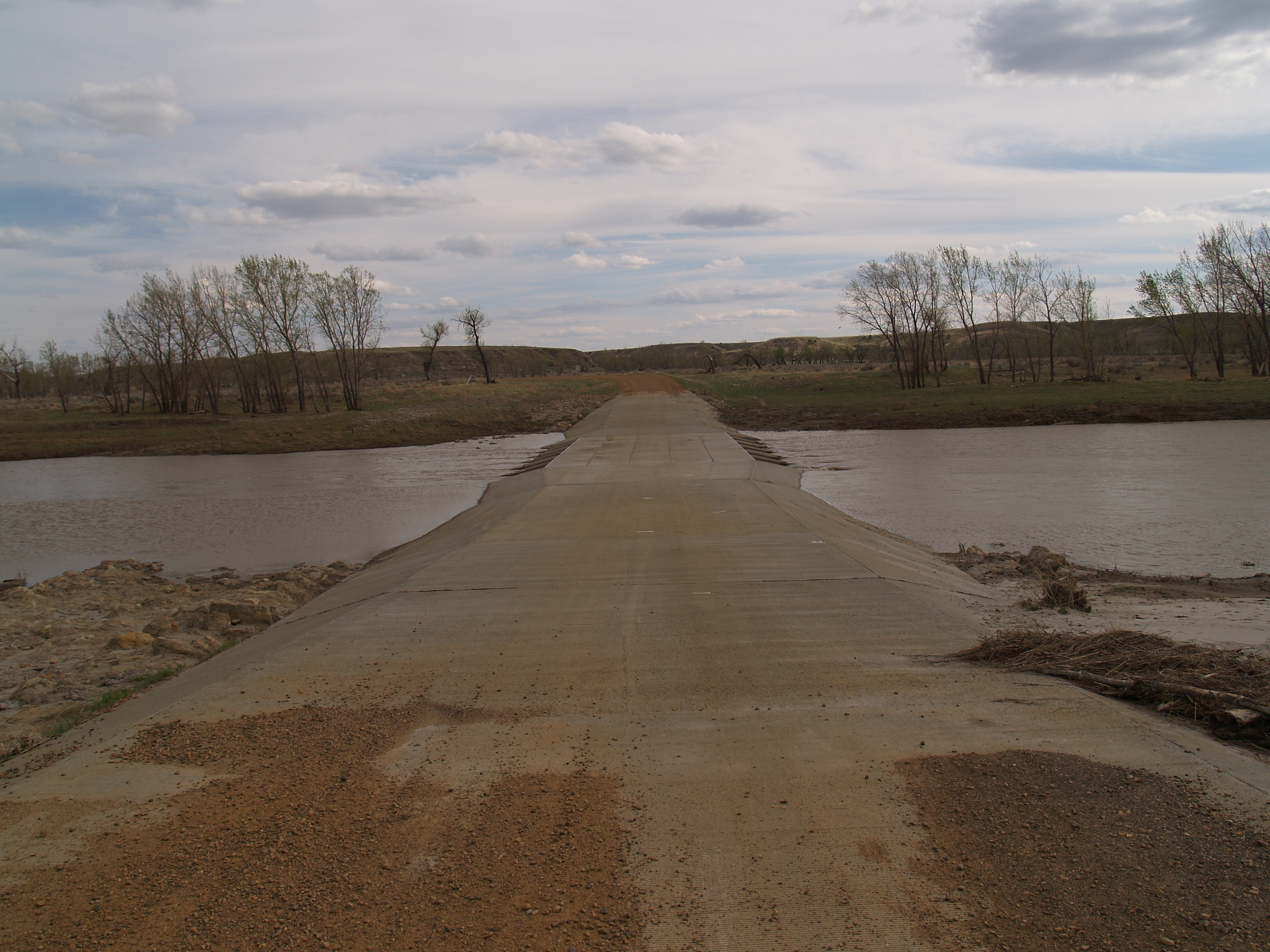
Three V Crossing across the Little Missouri River

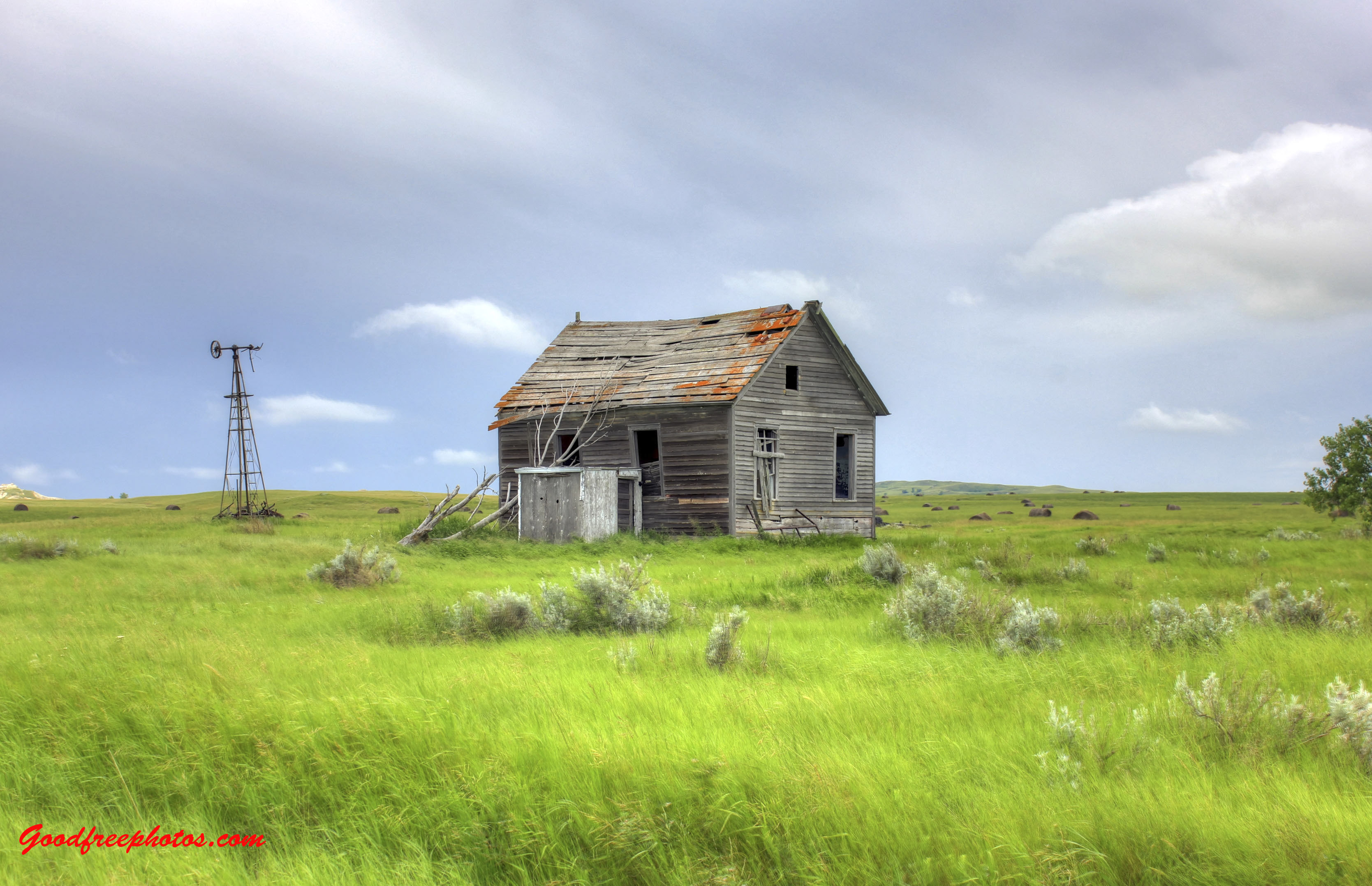
Old house

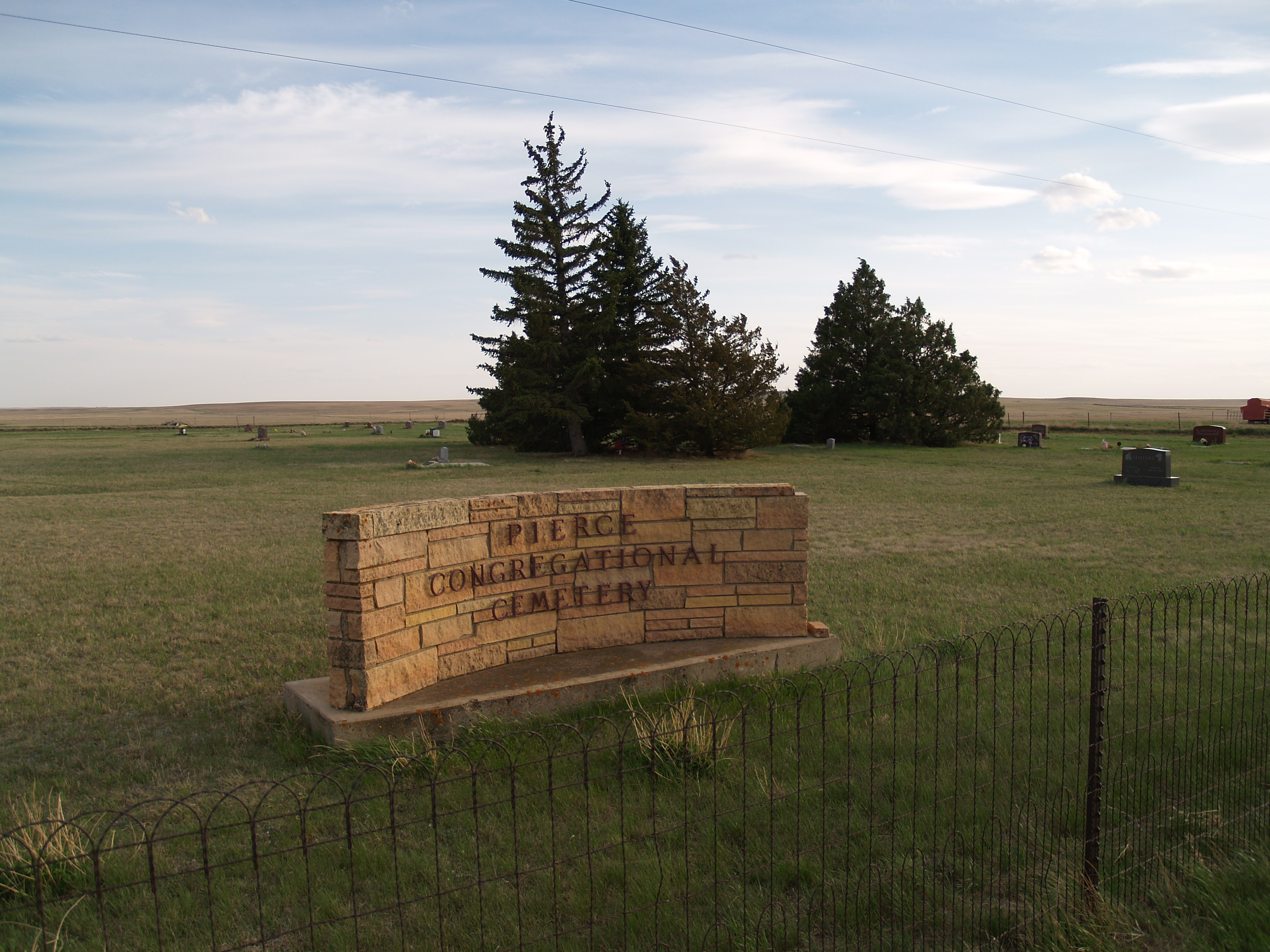
Pierce Congregational Cemetery in Woodberry Township

== See also ==
- National Register of Historic Places listings in Slope County, North Dakota
- Yule Ranch
