= Emily E. Sloan =

American poet (1878–1973)

- Born: Emily Eva Mullenger Sloan; October 27, 1878; Oregon, Wisconsin, U.S.
- Died: September 16, 1973 (aged 94)
- Education: University of Montana Law School
- Occupation: Poet

Emily Eva Mullenger Sloan (October 27, 1878 – September 16, 1973) became the first woman elected to the office of county attorney in Montana in 1924. She won her election as County Attorney in Carbon County, Montana by 33 votes. She was the 22nd female attorney in Montana.

Sloan was born in Oregon, Wisconsin, United States, and grew up in South Dakota; she lived in Belle Fourche, South Dakota, as a teenager. She became a ranch wife and raised four children. Because she did not have a high school diploma, she was accepted as a special student at the University of Montana Law School, where she studied from October 1, 1917, to June 2, 1919.

Although she was not able to complete her studies and graduate, she passed the bar exam and was admitted to the Montana Bar in June 1919. She practiced law in Yellowstone County, Montana, for three years. Then she moved to Red Lodge, Montana, to run for County Attorney.

She worked as the Carbon County attorney from 1924 to 1926. In 1938, she sought, but failed to secure, nomination for clerk of the district court.

She is also known for a 1956 novel set in Rhame, North Dakota, Prairie Schoolma'am, and a book of poetry, Ballads of the Plains.

She lived into her 90s.

== Works ==
- Ballads of the Plains. Denver: Great Western Publishing Co. 1908.
- Prairie Schoolma'am. New York: Vantage Press. 1956. OCLC 10882033.
- Hitting the High Spots. Mesa, Arizona: V. Carter Service, 1959. OCLC: 41768210
