= Bowman, North Dakota =

- City
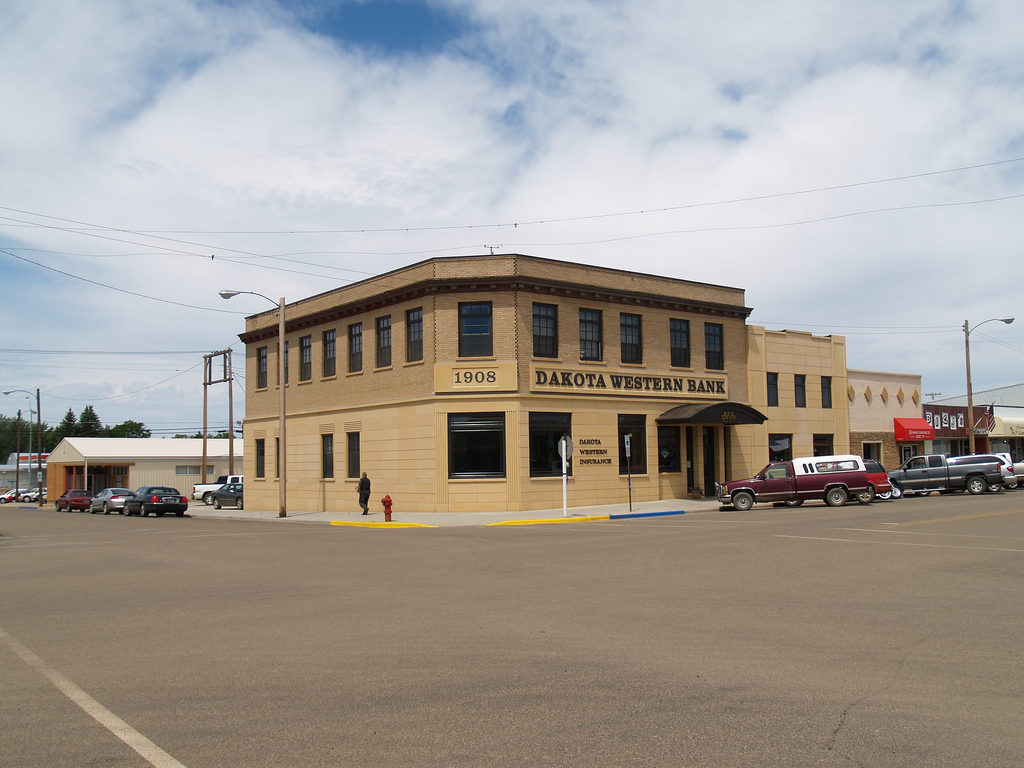
- Dakota Western Bank, Bowman, North Dakota

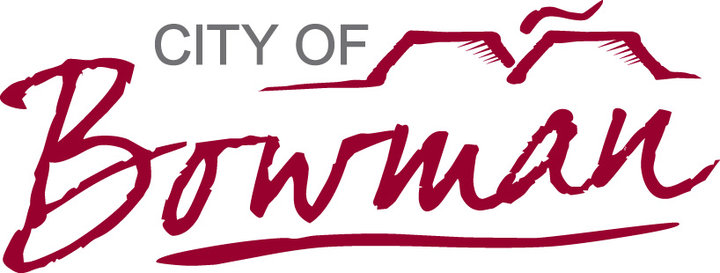
- Logo

- Location of Bowman, North Dakota
- Coordinates: 46°11′04″N 103°24′11″W
- Country: United States
- State: North Dakota
- County: Bowman
- Founded: 1907

Government
  - City Commissioner: Lyn James

Area
  - Total: 1.86 sq mi (4.83 km^{2})
  - Land: 1.86 sq mi (4.83 km^{2})
  - Water: 0 sq mi (0.00 km^{2})
- Elevation: 2,963 ft (903 m)

Population (2020)
  - Total: 1,470
  - Estimate (2022): 1,424
  - Density: 788.5/sq mi (304.43/km^{2})
- Time zone: UTC-7 (Mountain (MST))
  - Summer (DST): UTC-6 (MDT)
- ZIP code: 58623
- Area code: 701
- FIPS code: 38-08700
- GNIS feature ID: 1035939
- Highways: US 12, US 85
- Website: bowmannd.com

Bowman is a city located in southwestern North Dakota and is the county seat of Bowman County, North Dakota, United States. The population was 1,470 at the 2020 census. Bowman is approximately 16 ½ miles north of the South Dakota border and roughly 32 miles east of the Montana border.

== History ==
Bowman was founded in 1907 at about the same time the railroad was extended to that point. The city took its name from Bowman County. A post office has been in operation at Bowman since 1907.

== Geography ==
According to the United States Census Bureau, the city has a total area of 1.53 square miles (3.96 km^{2}), all land.

=== Climate ===
According to the Köppen climate classification system, Bowman has a humid continental climate (Dfb), typical for North Dakota. Being relatively proximate to the Rocky Mountains and their warming chinook winds, it is less frigid during winter than most of North Dakota despite its higher altitude. January mean temperatures are 7.2 °F or 4.0 °C warmer than Fargo, 3.6 °F or 2.0 °C warmer than Bismarck, and 10.3 °F or 5.7 °C warmer than Grand Forks.

Climate data for Bowman, North Dakota, 1991–2020 normals, extremes 1915–present
Month	Jan	Feb	Mar	Apr	May	Jun	Jul	Aug	Sep	Oct	Nov	Dec	Year
Record high °F (°C)	66 (19)	69 (21)	80 (27)	90 (32)	99 (37)	106 (41)	112 (44)	108 (42)	102 (39)	94 (34)	80 (27)	68 (20)	112 (44)
Mean maximum °F (°C)	49.4 (9.7)	52.3 (11.3)	66.9 (19.4)	77.3 (25.2)	84.5 (29.2)	92.1 (33.4)	97.9 (36.6)	97.8 (36.6)	93.8 (34.3)	80.4 (26.9)	65.8 (18.8)	52.0 (11.1)	100.1 (37.8)
Mean daily maximum °F (°C)	26.3 (−3.2)	29.9 (−1.2)	40.8 (4.9)	52.9 (11.6)	64.0 (17.8)	74.2 (23.4)	82.7 (28.2)	82.4 (28.0)	72.1 (22.3)	55.6 (13.1)	40.7 (4.8)	29.8 (−1.2)	54.3 (12.4)
Daily mean °F (°C)	16.4 (−8.7)	19.4 (−7.0)	29.6 (−1.3)	40.7 (4.8)	52.0 (11.1)	62.1 (16.7)	69.2 (20.7)	67.9 (19.9)	57.7 (14.3)	43.1 (6.2)	29.7 (−1.3)	19.8 (−6.8)	42.3 (5.7)
Mean daily minimum °F (°C)	6.5 (−14.2)	8.8 (−12.9)	18.3 (−7.6)	28.5 (−1.9)	39.9 (4.4)	50.0 (10.0)	55.8 (13.2)	53.5 (11.9)	43.3 (6.3)	30.5 (−0.8)	18.7 (−7.4)	9.7 (−12.4)	30.3 (−0.9)
Mean minimum °F (°C)	−18.4 (−28.0)	−12.0 (−24.4)	−3.4 (−19.7)	13.0 (−10.6)	26.1 (−3.3)	38.5 (3.6)	46.0 (7.8)	42.5 (5.8)	30.1 (−1.1)	13.6 (−10.2)	−0.8 (−18.2)	−12.5 (−24.7)	−23.7 (−30.9)
Record low °F (°C)	−43 (−42)	−43 (−42)	−28 (−33)	−11 (−24)	9 (−13)	25 (−4)	35 (2)	33 (1)	9 (−13)	−11 (−24)	−24 (−31)	−36 (−38)	−43 (−42)
Average precipitation inches (mm)	0.56 (14)	0.62 (16)	0.80 (20)	1.56 (40)	2.72 (69)	3.10 (79)	2.13 (54)	1.41 (36)	1.59 (40)	1.56 (40)	0.53 (13)	0.50 (13)	17.08 (434)
Average snowfall inches (cm)	7.6 (19)	7.6 (19)	7.4 (19)	8.0 (20)	1.9 (4.8)	0.0 (0.0)	0.0 (0.0)	0.0 (0.0)	0.0 (0.0)	3.9 (9.9)	5.4 (14)	6.4 (16)	48.2 (122)
Average precipitation days (≥ 0.01 in)	6.9	7.1	7.0	8.8	11.0	12.2	9.7	7.0	6.7	7.1	5.5	7.3	96.3
Average snowy days (≥ 0.1 in)	6.5	6.3	4.9	2.9	0.7	0.0	0.0	0.0	0.0	1.8	4.1	6.4	33.6
Source: NOAA

== Demographics ==
Historical population
Census	Pop.	Note	%±
1910	481		—
1920	767		59.5%
1930	888		15.8%
1940	967		8.9%
1950	1,382		42.9%
1960	1,730		25.2%
1970	1,762		1.8%
1980	2,071		17.5%
1990	1,741		−15.9%
2000	1,600		−8.1%
2010	1,650		3.1%
2020	1,470		−10.9%
2022 (est.)	1,424		−3.1%
U.S. Decennial Census; 2020 Census

=== 2010 census ===
As of the census of 2010, there were 1,650 people, 760 households, and 422 families living in the city. The population density was 1,078.4 inhabitants per square mile (416.4/km^{2}). There were 867 housing units at an average density of 566.7 per square mile (218.8/km^{2}). The racial makeup of the city was 97.7% White, 0.2% Native American, 0.1% Asian, 1.5% from other races, and 0.5% from two or more races. Hispanic or Latino of any race were 3.9% of the population.

There were 760 households, of which 22.9% had children under the age of 18 living with them, 46.4% were married couples living together, 5.4% had a female householder with no husband present, 3.7% had a male householder with no wife present, and 44.5% were non-families. 39.3% of all households were made up of individuals, and 19.9% had someone living alone who was 65 years of age or older. The average household size was 2.06 and the average family size was 2.77.

The median age in the city was 48.4 years. 19.1% of residents were under the age of 18; 6.8% were between the ages of 18 and 24; 19.9% were from 25 to 44; 27.5% were from 45 to 64; and 26.7% were 65 years of age or older. The gender makeup of the city was 48.5% male and 51.5% female.

=== 2000 census ===
As of the census of 2000, there were 1,600 people, 702 households, and 419 families living in the city. The population density was 1,227.8 inhabitants per square mile (474.1/km^{2}). There were 799 housing units at an average density of 613.2 per square mile (236.8/km^{2}). The racial makeup of the city was 99.12% White, 0.12% Native American, 0.12% from other races, and 0.62% from two or more races. Hispanic or Latino of any race were 0.75% of the population.

There were 702 households, out of which 25.9% had children under the age of 18 living with them, 51.3% were married couples living together, 6.1% had a female householder with no husband present, and 40.3% were non-families. 37.5% of all households were made up of individuals, and 21.1% had someone living alone who was 65 years of age or older. The average household size was 2.15 and the average family size was 2.84.

In the city, the population was spread out, with 21.7% under the age of 18, 5.2% from 18 to 24, 23.8% from 25 to 44, 22.5% from 45 to 64, and 26.9% who were 65 years of age or older. The median age was 45 years. For every 100 females, there were 91.2 males. For every 100 females age 18 and over, there were 89.6 males.

The median income for a household in the city was $31,645, and the median income for a family was $41,131. Males had a median income of $28,824 versus $19,688 for females. The per capita income for the city was $18,851. About 5.4% of families and 7.5% of the population were below the poverty line, including 8.2% of those under age 18 and 9.6% of those age 65 or over.

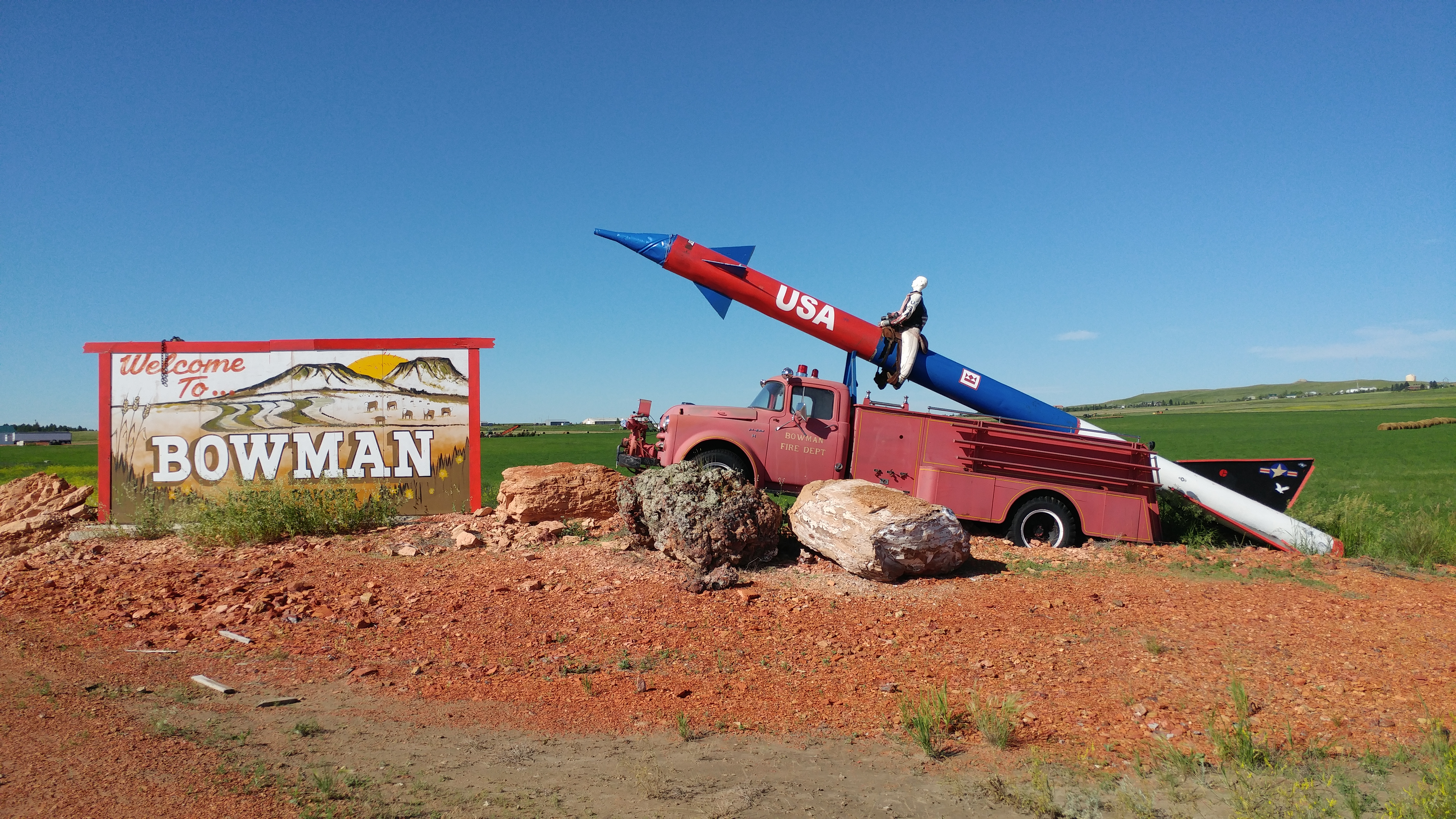
"Welcome to Bowman" sign and Cowboy Riding Missile art installation north of Bowman

== Education ==
The city is home to Bowman County School District 1, which operates Bowman County High School.

== Radio ==
- KPOK (1340 AM)

== Notable people ==
- Shaun Sipma, Mayor of Minot, North Dakota
- Chris Tuchscherer, mixed martial arts and UFC fighter
