= New England, North Dakota =

- City
- Logo
- Interactive map of New England, North Dakota
- Location within North Dakota
- Coordinates: 46.5408°N 102.8670°W
- Country: United States
- State: North Dakota
- County: Hettinger
- Founded: 1887
- Incorporated (village): October 22, 1910
- Incorporated (city): March 19, 1918
- Founded by: Captain J.G. Saunders

Government
  - Type: Mayor–council
  - Mayor: Lyle Kovar
  - Auditor: Jason Jung
  - City Commission: Tom Gorek; Rex Fitch; Chris Fitterer; Breann Krebs; Mike Grote

Area
  - Total: 0.493 sq mi (1.276 km^{2})
  - Land: 0.493 sq mi (1.276 km^{2})
  - Water: 0 sq mi (0.000 km^{2}) 0.00%
- Elevation: 2,602 ft (793 m)

Population (2020)
  - Total: 683
  - Estimate (2025): 717
  - Density: 1,390/sq mi (535/km^{2})
- Time zone: UTC–7 (Mountain (MST))
  - Summer (DST): UTC–6 (MDT)
- ZIP Code: 58647
- Area code: 701
- FIPS code: 38-56180
- GNIS feature ID: 1036180
- Highway: ND 22
- Website: ndnewengland.com

New England is a city in Hettinger County, North Dakota, United States. The population was 683 as of the 2020 census, and was estimated at 717 in 2025.

== History ==
New England was founded in 1887, predating all other settlements in Hettinger County by many years. The name recognizes that many early settlers were from the New England states of Vermont and Massachusetts. Until the tracks were abandoned in 1983, the city was located at the terminus of a Milwaukee Road branch line that split from the railroad's Pacific Extension in McLaughlin, South Dakota. New England was incorporated as a village on June 15, 1921 and as a city on July 1, 1967.

The silhouette of the two Rainy Buttes near New England is a distinguishing symbol of the town.

== Geography ==
According to the United States Census Bureau, the city has a total area of 0.493 square miles (1.28 km^{2}), all land.

== Climate ==
New England has a humid continental climate (Dfb)/cool semi-arid climate (BSk), characterised by very warm summers with moderate rainfall mostly from thunderstorms, and freezing, dry winters. The frequent occurrences of warm chinook winds in winter, however, means that New England holds the record for the warmest temperature recorded in North Dakota in December and is only 1 °F or 0.6 °C below Fort Yates’ record for the state’s warmest February (and winter season) temperature.

Climate data for New England, North Dakota (1991–2020 normals, extremes 1894–present)
Month	Jan	Feb	Mar	Apr	May	Jun	Jul	Aug	Sep	Oct	Nov	Dec	Year
Record high °F (°C)	64 (18)	71 (22)	84 (29)	94 (34)	105 (41)	108 (42)	114 (46)	109 (43)	105 (41)	95 (35)	80 (27)	70 (21)	114 (46)
Mean daily maximum °F (°C)	27.4 (−2.6)	31.1 (−0.5)	42.7 (5.9)	55.3 (12.9)	66.9 (19.4)	76.1 (24.5)	84.0 (28.9)	83.6 (28.7)	73.3 (22.9)	56.9 (13.8)	41.8 (5.4)	30.5 (−0.8)	55.8 (13.2)
Daily mean °F (°C)	16.7 (−8.5)	20.2 (−6.6)	30.9 (−0.6)	42.3 (5.7)	53.8 (12.1)	63.4 (17.4)	70.0 (21.1)	68.8 (20.4)	58.9 (14.9)	44.2 (6.8)	30.4 (−0.9)	19.9 (−6.7)	43.3 (6.3)
Mean daily minimum °F (°C)	6.0 (−14.4)	9.3 (−12.6)	19.1 (−7.2)	29.2 (−1.6)	40.8 (4.9)	50.7 (10.4)	55.9 (13.3)	54.0 (12.2)	44.5 (6.9)	31.5 (−0.3)	19.0 (−7.2)	9.2 (−12.7)	30.8 (−0.7)
Record low °F (°C)	−44 (−42)	−46 (−43)	−31 (−35)	−11 (−24)	5 (−15)	25 (−4)	28 (−2)	28 (−2)	3 (−16)	−12 (−24)	−25 (−32)	−37 (−38)	−46 (−43)
Average precipitation inches (mm)	0.22 (5.6)	0.35 (8.9)	0.77 (20)	1.52 (39)	2.64 (67)	3.23 (82)	1.88 (48)	1.62 (41)	1.59 (40)	1.49 (38)	0.39 (9.9)	0.20 (5.1)	15.90 (404)
Average snowfall inches (cm)	6.3 (16)	7.0 (18)	7.0 (18)	6.1 (15)	1.3 (3.3)	0.1 (0.25)	0.0 (0.0)	0.0 (0.0)	0.0 (0.0)	4.2 (11)	5.9 (15)	6.4 (16)	44.3 (113)
Average precipitation days (≥ 0.01 in)	3.2	3.3	4.0	6.0	8.2	8.8	6.8	4.9	4.3	4.4	2.9	2.8	59.6
Average snowy days (≥ 0.1 in)	4.2	4.4	3.3	1.8	0.4	0.0	0.0	0.0	0.0	1.3	2.8	4.5	22.7
Source 1: National Oceanic and Atmospheric Administration
Source 2: National Centers for Environmental Information

== Demographics ==
Historical population
Census	Pop.	Note	%±
1920	613		—
1930	911		48.6%
1940	895		−1.8%
1950	1,117		24.8%
1960	1,095		−2.0%
1970	906		−17.3%
1980	825		−8.9%
1990	663		−19.6%
2000	555		−16.3%
2010	600		8.1%
2020	683		13.8%
2025 (est.)	717		5.0%
U.S. Decennial Census; 2020 Census

As of the 2024 American Community Survey, there were 250 estimated households in New England with an average of 1.91 persons per household. The city has a median household income of $74,722. Approximately 14.4% of the city's population lives at or below the poverty line. New England has an estimated 54.9% employment rate, with 9.7% of the population holding a bachelor's degree or higher and 90.1% holding a high school diploma. There were 316 housing units at an average density of 640.97 per square mile (247.5/km^{2}).

The top five reported languages (people were allowed to report up to two languages, thus the figures will generally add to more than 100%) were English (91.9%), Spanish (6.4%), Indo-European (0.7%), Asian and Pacific Islander (0.0%), and Other (0.9%).

The median age in the city was 38.8 years.

New England, North Dakota – racial and ethnic composition Note: the US Census treats Hispanic/Latino as an ethnic category. This table excludes Latinos from the racial categories and assigns them to a separate category. Hispanics/Latinos may be of any race.
Race / ethnicity (NH = non-Hispanic)	Pop. 2000	Pop. 2010	Pop. 2020	% 2000	% 2010	% 2020
White alone (NH)	543	543	615	97.84%	90.50%	90.04%
Black or African American alone (NH)	0	6	0	0.00%	1.00%	0.00%
Native American or Alaska Native alone (NH)	3	35	23	0.54%	5.83%	3.37%
Asian alone (NH)	2	1	3	0.36%	0.17%	0.44%
Pacific Islander alone (NH)	0	0	1	0.00%	0.00%	0.15%
Other race alone (NH)	0	0	3	0.00%	0.00%	0.44%
Mixed race or multiracial (NH)	5	12	23	0.90%	2.00%	3.37%
Hispanic or Latino (any race)	2	3	15	0.36%	0.50%	2.20%
Total	555	600	683	100.00%	100.00%	100.00%

=== 2020 census ===
As of the 2020 census, there were 683 people, 265 households, and 139 families residing in the city. The population density was 1,385.40 inhabitants per square mile (534.9/km^{2}). There were 345 housing units at an average density of 699.80 per square mile (270.2/km^{2}). The racial makeup of the city was 90.63% White, 0.00% African American, 3.37% Native American, 0.59% Asian, 0.15% Pacific Islander, 0.73% from some other races and 4.54% from two or more races. Hispanic or Latino people of any race were 2.20% of the population.

=== 2010 census ===
As of the 2010 census, there were 600 people, 258 households, and 132 families residing in the city. The population density was 1,217.04 inhabitants per square mile (469.9/km^{2}). There were 319 housing units at an average density of 647.06 per square mile (249.8/km^{2}). The racial makeup of the city was 90.83% White, 1.00% African American, 6.00% Native American, 0.17% Asian, 0.00% Pacific Islander, 0.00% from some other races and 2.00% from two or more races. Hispanic or Latino people of any race were 0.50% of the population.

There were 258 households, of which 17.4% had children under the age of 18 living with them, 44.2% were married couples living together, 4.3% had a female householder with no husband present, 2.7% had a male householder with no wife present, and 48.8% were non-families. 45.3% of all households were made up of individuals, and 26% had someone living alone who was 65 years of age or older. The average household size was 1.88 and the average family size was 2.58.

The median age was 46.6 years. 11.7% of residents were under the age of 18; 9.1% were between the ages of 18 and 24; 27.2% were from 25 to 44; 28.9% were from 45 to 64; and 23.2% were 65 years of age or older. The gender makeup was 37.8% male and 62.2% female.

=== 2000 census ===
As of the 2000 census, there were 555 people, 266 households and 155 families residing in the city. The population density was 1,106.14 inhabitants per square mile (427.1/km^{2}). There were 320 housing units at an average density of 637.78 per square mile (246.2/km^{2}). The racial makeup of the city was 98.20% White, 0.00% African American, 0.54% Native American, 0.36% Asian, 0.00% Pacific Islander, 0.00% from some other races and 0.90% from two or more races. Hispanic or Latino people of any race were 0.36% of the population.

There were 266 households, of which 21.8% had children under the age of 18 living with them, 52.6% were married couples living together, 3.0% had a female householder with no husband present, and 41.4% were non-families. 38.7% of all households were made up of individuals, and 21.4% had someone living alone who was 65 years of age or older. The average household size was 2.08 and the average family size was 2.77.

20.7% of the population were under the age of 18, 4.3% from 18 to 24, 20.4% from 25 to 44, 30.5% from 45 to 64, and 24.1% who were 65 years of age or older. The median age was 48 years. For every 100 females, there were 88.8 males. For every 100 females age 18 and over, there were 92.1 males.

The median household income was $30,764 and the median family income was $39,063. Males had a median income of $30,357 and females $16,667. The per capita income was $17,489. About 7.0% of families and 7.4% of the population were below the poverty line, including 6.8% of those under age 18 and 10.6% of those age 65 or over.

== Government ==
The Southwest Multi-County Correction Center, on behalf of the North Dakota Department of Corrections and Rehabilitation, operates the Dakota Women's Correctional and Rehabilitation Center in New England.

== Education ==
The New England Public School District 9 was organized in September 1914.

- New England High School (7-12) in New England
- New England Elementary School (PK-6) in New England

The area is served by the New England Public School District 9. It operates the New England School. In the 2025-26 academic year, the district reported a total of 266 students.
