= Thunder Hawk, South Dakota =

Unincorporated community in South Dakota, U.S.

Coordinates: 45°56′18″N 101°58′30″W

Thunder Hawk is an unincorporated community in Corson County, in the U.S. state of South Dakota.

== History ==
A post office called Thunder Hawk was established in 1909, and remained in operation until 1965. The community has the name of a Hunkpapa chief.
