= List of ghost towns in North Dakota =

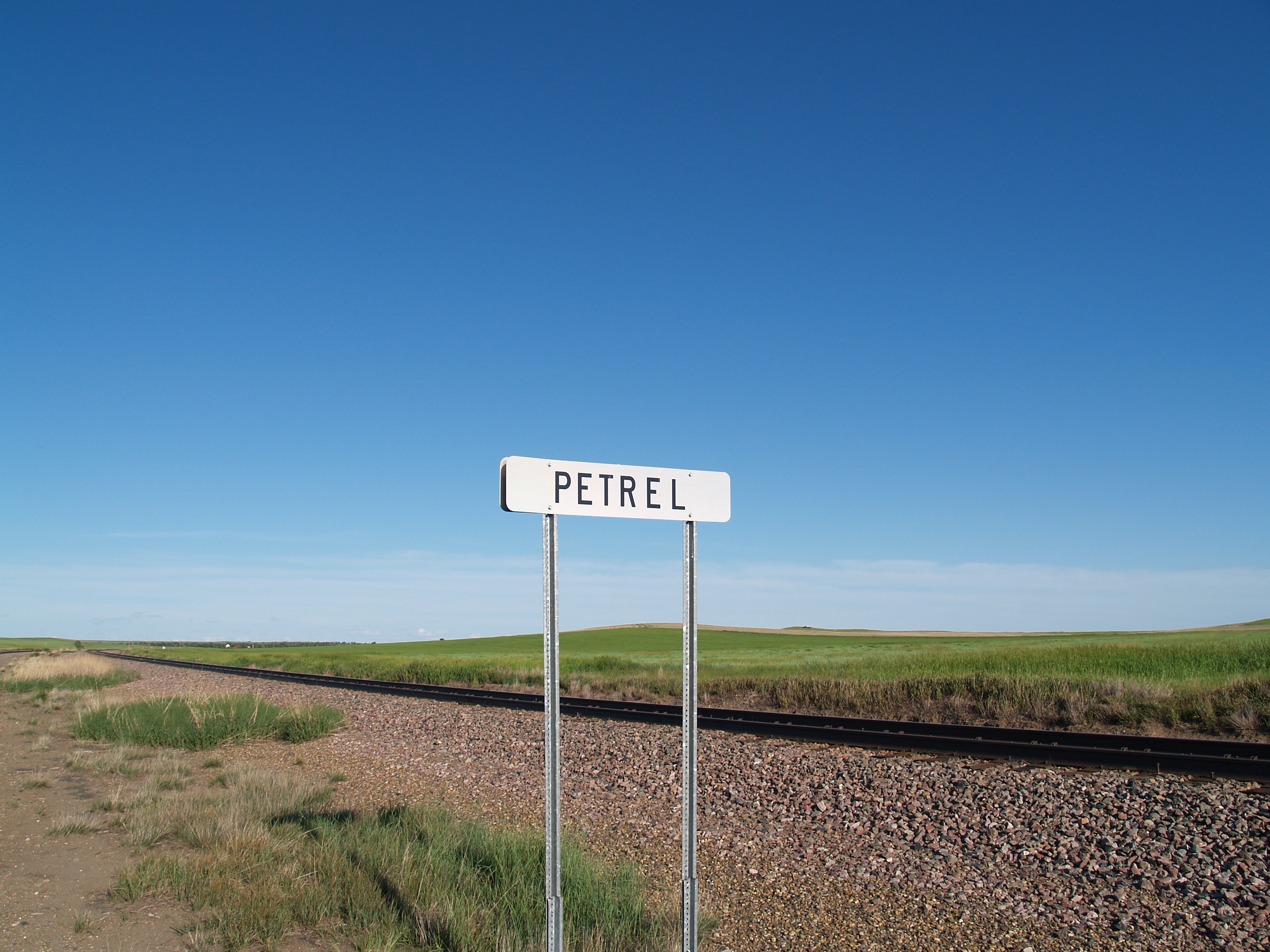
A sign along the railroad tracks in Petrel

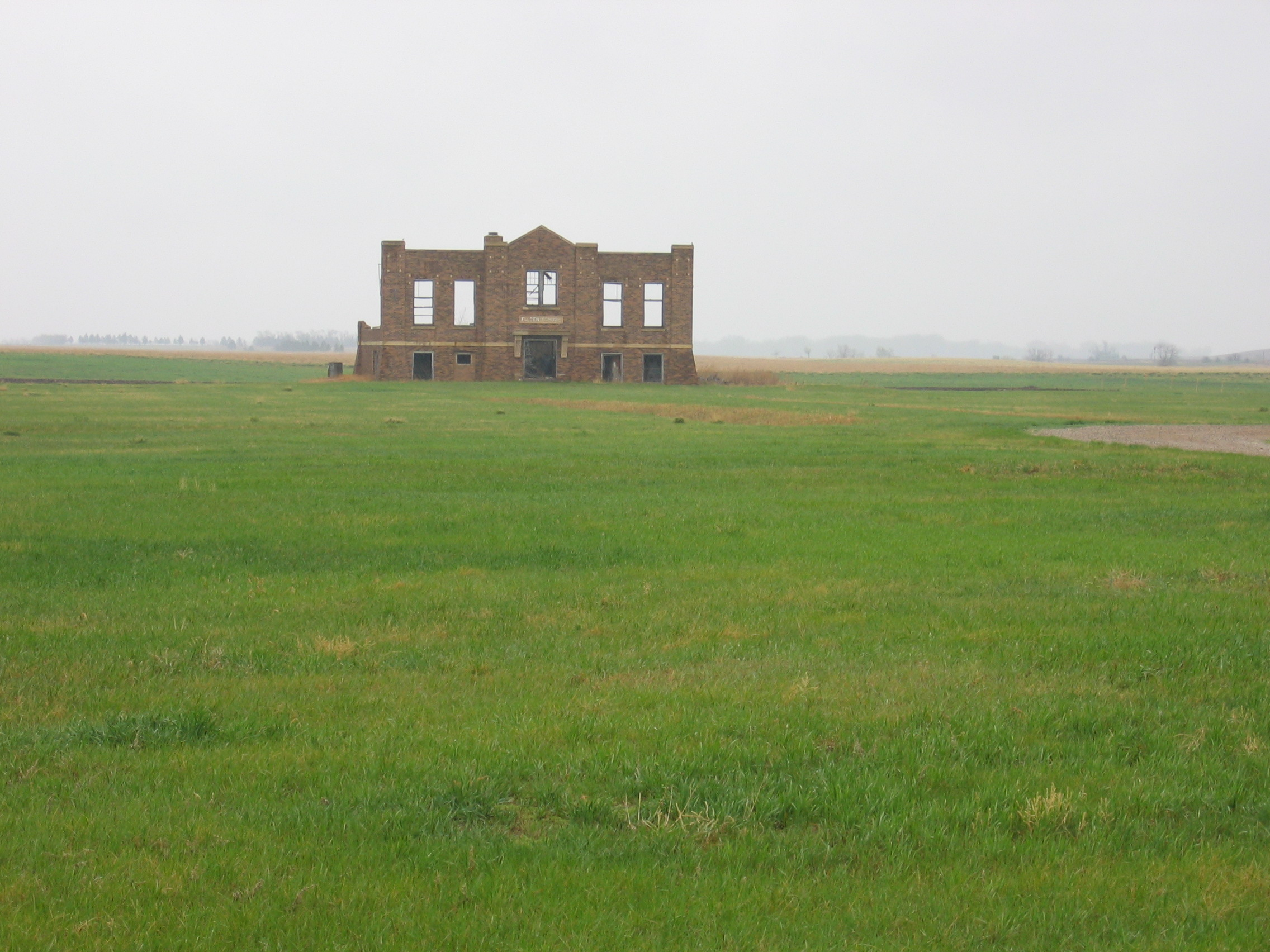
The abandoned Falsen School in Verendrye

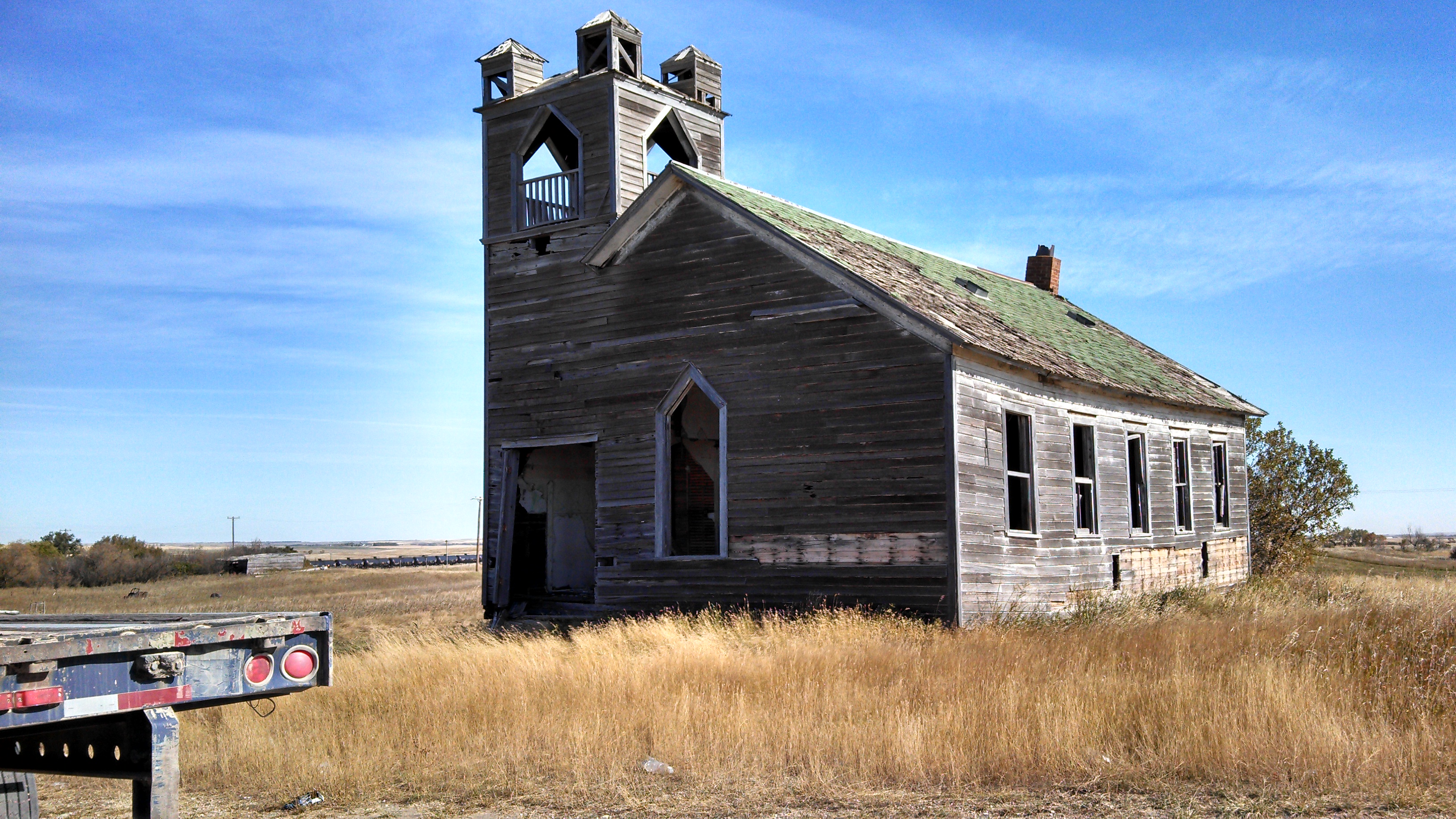
Abandoned church in Temple

Several ghost towns have been recorded in North Dakota and are in various states of disrepair; some are mostly intact but have no residents, while others have completely barren or inaccessible sites. Other communities might have a small population but are frequently referred to as a ghost town due to population decline and disrepair.

== Classification ==
Barren site

- Sites no longer in existence
- Sites that have been destroyed
- Submerged
- Reverted to pasture
- May have a few difficult-to-find foundations/footings at most

Neglected site

- Only rubble left
- All buildings uninhabited
- Roofless building ruins
- Some buildings or houses still standing

Abandoned site

- Buildings or houses still standing
- Buildings and houses all abandoned
- No population, except caretaker
- Site no longer in existence except for one or two buildings

Semi-abandoned site

- Building or houses still standing
- Buildings and houses largely abandoned
- Fewer than 50 residents
- Many abandoned buildings
- Small population

== Ghost towns ==
Name	County	Settled	Abandoned	Status	Notes
Alfred	LaMoure			Semi-abandoned	
Amidon	Slope	1910		Semi-abandoned	
Appam	Williams	1916		Semi-abandoned	
Arena	Burleigh	1906	1996	Abandoned	
Aurelia	Ward			Abandoned	
Baden	Ward			Barren	
Beaver Creek	Williams		c. 1955	Barren	Submerged under Lake Sakakawea
Belden	Mountrail	1904		Semi-abandoned	
Bentley	Hettinger	1910		Semi-abandoned	
Brisbane	Grant	1906		Barren	
Carbury	Bottineau	1901	c. 2000	Abandoned	
Bucyrus	Adams	1908		Semi-abandoned	
Charbonneau	McKenzie		c.1960	Abandoned	
Charging Eagle	Dunn		c. 1955	Barren	Submerged under Lake Sakakawea
Cleveland	Stutsman	1882		Semi-abandoned	
Clyde	Cavalier	1905		Semi-abandoned	
Dengate	Morton				
Dogtooth	Grant	1876	c. 1911	Barren	
Elbowoods	McLean	1889	1954	Barren	Submerged under Lake Sakakawea
Emmet	McLean	1903			
Epworth	Mountrail				
Fort Buford	Williams	1866	1895	Abandoned	U.S. Army fort
Freda	Grant	1910	c. 1975	Neglected	
Gascoyne	Bowman	1911		Semi-abandoned	
Gorham	Billings	c. 1899	1972	Abandoned	
Hample	Sargent			Barren	
Hartland	Ward	1907	1966		
Heaton	Wells	1895		Semi-abandoned	
Independence	Dunn		c. 1955	Barren	Submerged under Lake Sakakawea
Ives	Bowman			Barren	
Kenaston	Ward			Semi-abandoned	
Keystone	Dickey				
Kincaid					
Kongsberg	McHenry			Abandoned	
Leipzig	Grant	1896	1910	Barren	
Lonetree	Ward				
Lucky Butte			c. 1955	Barren	Submerged under Lake Sakakawea
Lynwood	Morton			Barren	
Merricourt	Dickey			Abandoned	
McKinney	Renville				
Mose	Griggs	1889	1943	Barren	
Mt. Carmel					
Nishu			c. 1955	Barren	Submerged under Lake Sakakawea
Old Fort Rice	Morton	1864	1878	Abandoned	United States Military fort
Old Sanish	Mountrail	c.1915	1953	Barren	Submerged under Lake Sakakawea
Omemee	Bottineau	1887	c. 1990s	Neglected	
Perella	Burke			Barren	
Petrel	Adams	1908		Barren	
Pierce	Burleigh		c. 1970's	Barren	Small community east of Bismarck, but got replaced by Lincoln. It is now reverted to pasture.
Red Butte			c. 1955	Barren	Submerged under Lake Sakakawea
Rival	Burke			Barren	
Roseglen	McLean			Semi-abandoned	
Sanger	Oliver	1879	1985	Barren	
Schafer	McKen-zie			Neglected	
Schmidt	Morton			Barren	
Shell Creek			c. 1955	Barren	Submerged under Lake Sakakawea
Sherbrooke	Steele	1884	circa 1920	Neglected	Abandoned after the county seat moved from it to Finley, North Dakota, in 1919.
Sims	Morton	1883		Semi-abandoned	Sims still has an active church, but nobody lives there anymore
Stampede	Burke			Neglected	
Saint Anthony	Emmons			Barren	This town is not to be confused with Saint Anthony, which is in Morton County, not Emmons County.
Sully Springs	Billings	c. 1880	c. 1939	Barren	Railroad town abandoned during the Great Depression
Tagus	Mountrail	1900	2001	Semi-abandoned	
Temple	Williams	1906	c. 1965	Neglected	
Temvik	Emmons	1904	2000		
Three V Crossing	Slope	1883	1910	Barren	Now a ranch, but used to be home to a post office, a general store, and a stagecoach stop.
Ukraina	Billings	c. 1906	c. 1949	Neglected	Only two cemeteries left
Verendrye	McHenry	1912	1970	Neglected	
Wabek	Mountrail			Abandoned	
Watrous	Hettinger	1910		Neglected	
Wheelock	Williams	1902	c. 1996	Semi-abandoned	
White Butte	Slope			Abandoned	This is talking about the abandoned town, White Butte, not the mountain.
Whitman	Nelson			Semi-abandoned	
