= Tagus, North Dakota =

Former town in Mountrail County, North Dakota

Coordinates: 48°20′47″N 101°56′03″W

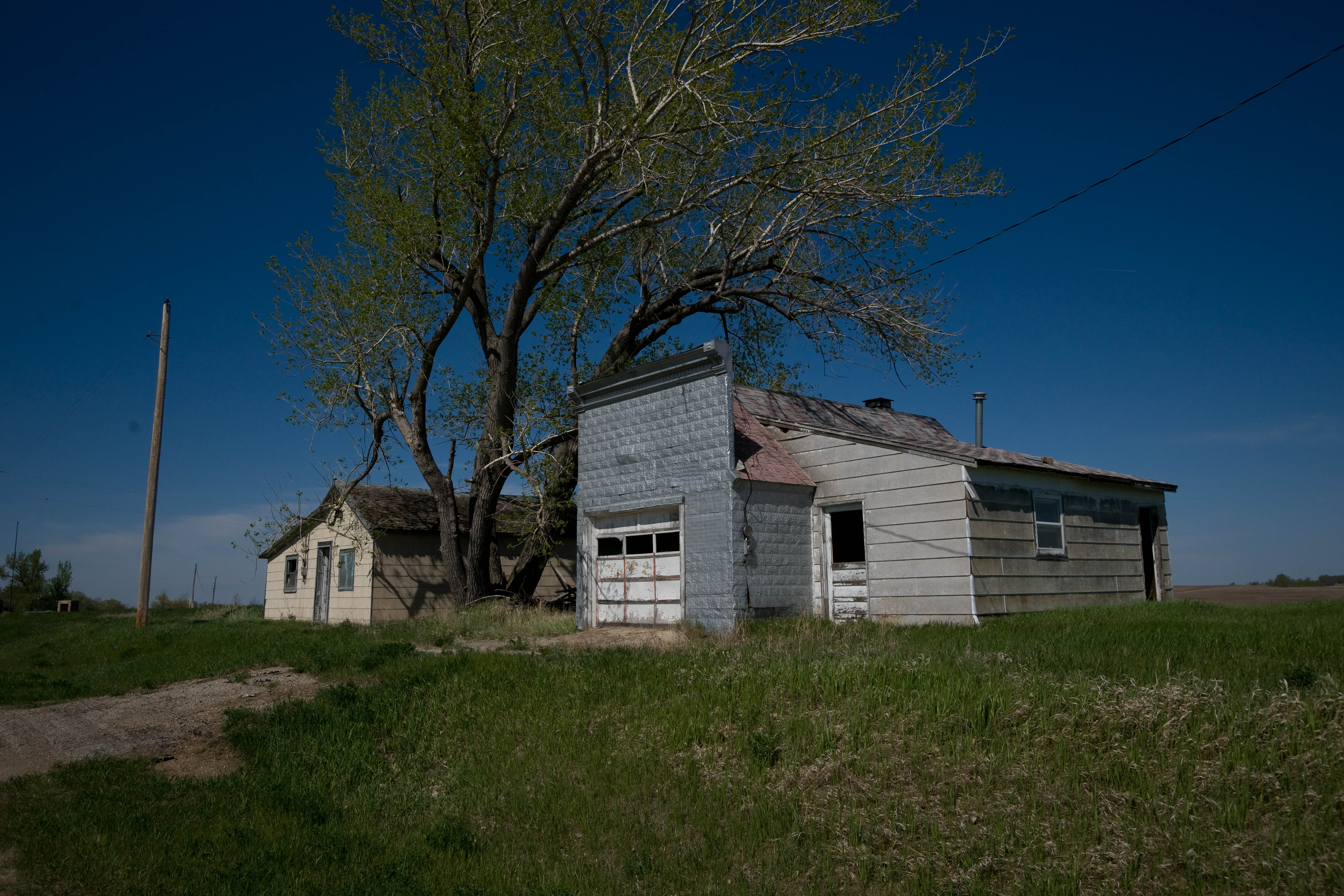
Buildings in Tagus

Tagus (/ˈteɪɡəs/ TAY-gəs) is a ghost town in Mountrail County, North Dakota, United States. The town was founded in 1900, approximately forty miles west of Minot and along the Great Northern Railway's transcontinental route. It was incorporated in 1908 and reached a peak population of 140 in 1940. It was originally named Wallace, but was later renamed Tagus to avoid confusion with the town of Wallace, Idaho. It was named after the Tagus river, the longest river in the Iberian Peninsula.

Tagus reported a population of just 14 during the 1970 Census, and the town disincorporated after its last business closed in 1976. The area is now part of Egan Township. In 2001, the sole remaining church was destroyed by fire, and local residents attribute the fire to vandalism. The spot is now marked by a memorial plaque. Tagus is now primarily abandoned, with a handful of residents and numerous vacant structures.

Historical population
| Census | Pop. | Note | %± |
|---|---|---|---|
| 1910 | 105 | | — |
| 1920 | 133 | | 26.7% |
| 1930 | 136 | | 2.3% |
| 1940 | 140 | | 2.9% |
| 1950 | 101 | | −27.9% |
| 1960 | 72 | | −28.7% |
| 1970 | 14 | | −80.6% |
U.S. Decennial Census

== Climate ==
This climatic region is typified by large seasonal temperature differences, with warm to hot (and often humid) summers and cold (sometimes severely cold) winters. According to the Köppen Climate Classification system, Tagus has a humid continental climate, abbreviated "Dfb" on climate maps.

== Transportation ==
Amtrak's Empire Builder, which operates between Seattle/Portland and Chicago, passes through the ghost town on BNSF tracks, but makes no stop. The nearest station is located in Stanley, 22 miles (35 km) to the west.

== See also ==
- List of ghost towns in North Dakota
