= North Billings, North Dakota =

- Unorganized territory
- Location within North Dakota
- Coordinates: 47°07′47″N 103°22′13″W
- Country: United States
- State: North Dakota
- County: Billings

Area
  - Total: 809.13 sq mi (2,095.63 km^{2})
  - Land: 806.27 sq mi (2,088.24 km^{2})
  - Water: 2.85 sq mi (7.39 km^{2})
- Elevation: 2,759 ft (841 m)

Population (2020)
  - Total: 566
  - Density: 0.702/sq mi (0.271/km^{2})
- Time zone: UTC-7 (Mountain (MST))
  - Summer (DST): UTC-6 (MDT)
- ZIP codes: 58621 (Beach); 58622 (Belfield); 58627 (Fairfield); 58634 (Grassy Butte); 58640 (Killdeer); 58642 (Manning); 58645 (Medora)
- Area code: 701
- FIPS code: 38-57710
- GNIS feature ID: 1036188

North Billings is an unorganized territory in Billings County, North Dakota, United States. The population was 566 at the 2020 census.

== Geography ==
North Billings has a total area of 809.129 square miles (2,095.63 km^{2}), of which 806.274 square miles (2,088.24 km^{2}) is land and 2.855 square miles (7.39 km^{2}) is water.

=== Major highways ===
- Interstate 94
- U.S. Highway 85

North Billings contains two settlements: the unincorporated communities of Gorham and Fairfield.

== Demographics ==
As of the 2024 American Community Survey, there were an estimated 208 households with a margin of error of 35.
