= South Billings, North Dakota =

- Unorganized territory
- Location within North Dakota
- Coordinates: 46°46′04″N 103°25′29″W
- Country: United States
- State: North Dakota
- County: Billings

Area
  - Total: 343.57 sq mi (889.85 km^{2})
  - Land: 341.82 sq mi (885.31 km^{2})
  - Water: 1.75 sq mi (4.54 km^{2})
- Elevation: 2,740 ft (835 m)

Population (2020)
  - Total: 258
  - Density: 0.755/sq mi (0.291/km^{2})
- Time zone: UTC-7 (Mountain (MST))
  - Summer (DST): UTC-6 (MDT)
- ZIP codes: 58620 (Amidon); 58622 (Belfield); 58645 (Medora)
- Area code: 701
- FIPS code: 38-74070
- GNIS feature ID: 1036266

South Billings is an unorganized territory in Billings County, North Dakota, United States. The population was 258 at the 2020 census.

== Geography ==
South Billings has a total area of 343.573 square miles (889.85 km^{2}), of which 341.821 square miles (885.31 km^{2}) is land and 1.752 square miles (4.54 km^{2}) is water.

It surrounds the city of Medora, and contains the unincorporated communities of Fryburg and Sully Springs.

=== Major highways ===
- Interstate 94

== Demographics ==
As of the 2023 American Community Survey, there were an estimated 93 households with a margin of error of 30.
