= Temple, North Dakota =

Extinct town in North Dakota, United States

Coordinates: 48°23′20″N 103°03′22″W

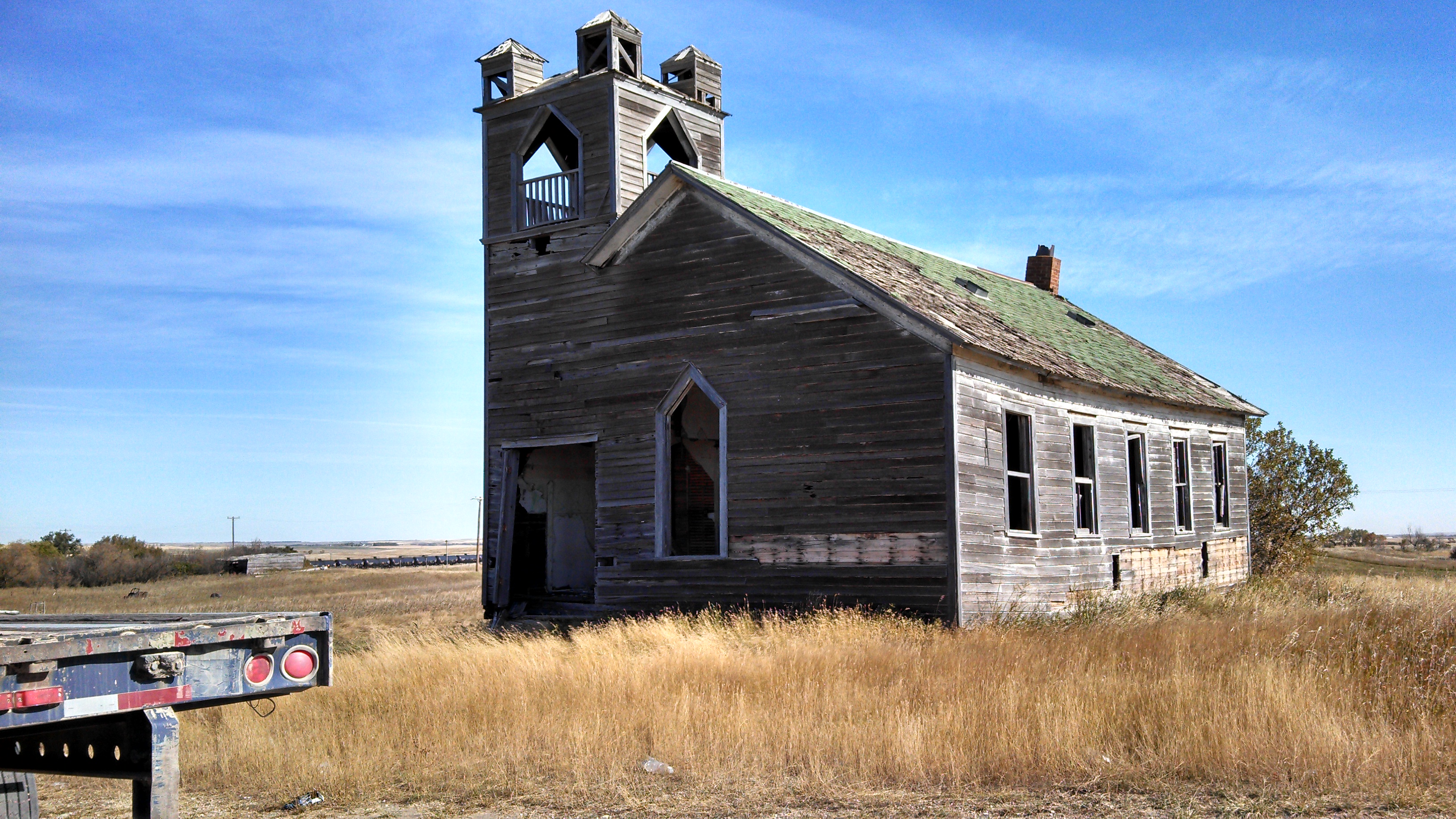
Church building in Temple, North Dakota

Temple is ghost town located in Williams County, North Dakota, United States. There are some remaining structures which include: a small garage, a couple small outbuildings and a couple caved-in houses. In 2003, one of the last two business buildings was either torn down or burned. The school was moved in 2010 and reportedly used as an addition to a house. The last business building collapsed in 2010, and was disposed of by 2012. One of the few remaining abandoned houses was destroyed in 2015. Also in 2015, the church was burned and razed, the reason is said to be because "it had deteriorated to the point that it became dangerous."

== Geography ==
Temple is located at 48°23'20"N 103°03'22"W. The elevation is 2,349 feet.

== History ==
The township known as Temple was first established on July 16, 1906, and was originally named Haarstad, for Ole G. Haarstad, the township postmaster and townsite owner. The town was later renamed to "Temple" by officials of the Great Northern Railway. Temple's post office was created on March 12, 1908, and was closed April 30, 1965.

== Transportation ==
Amtrak's Empire Builder, which operates between Seattle/Portland and Chicago, passes through the town on BNSF tracks, but makes no stop. The nearest station is located in Stanley, 35 miles (56 km) to the east.

== See also ==
- List of ghost towns in North Dakota
