= Wheelock, North Dakota =

Wheelock
- Ghost town
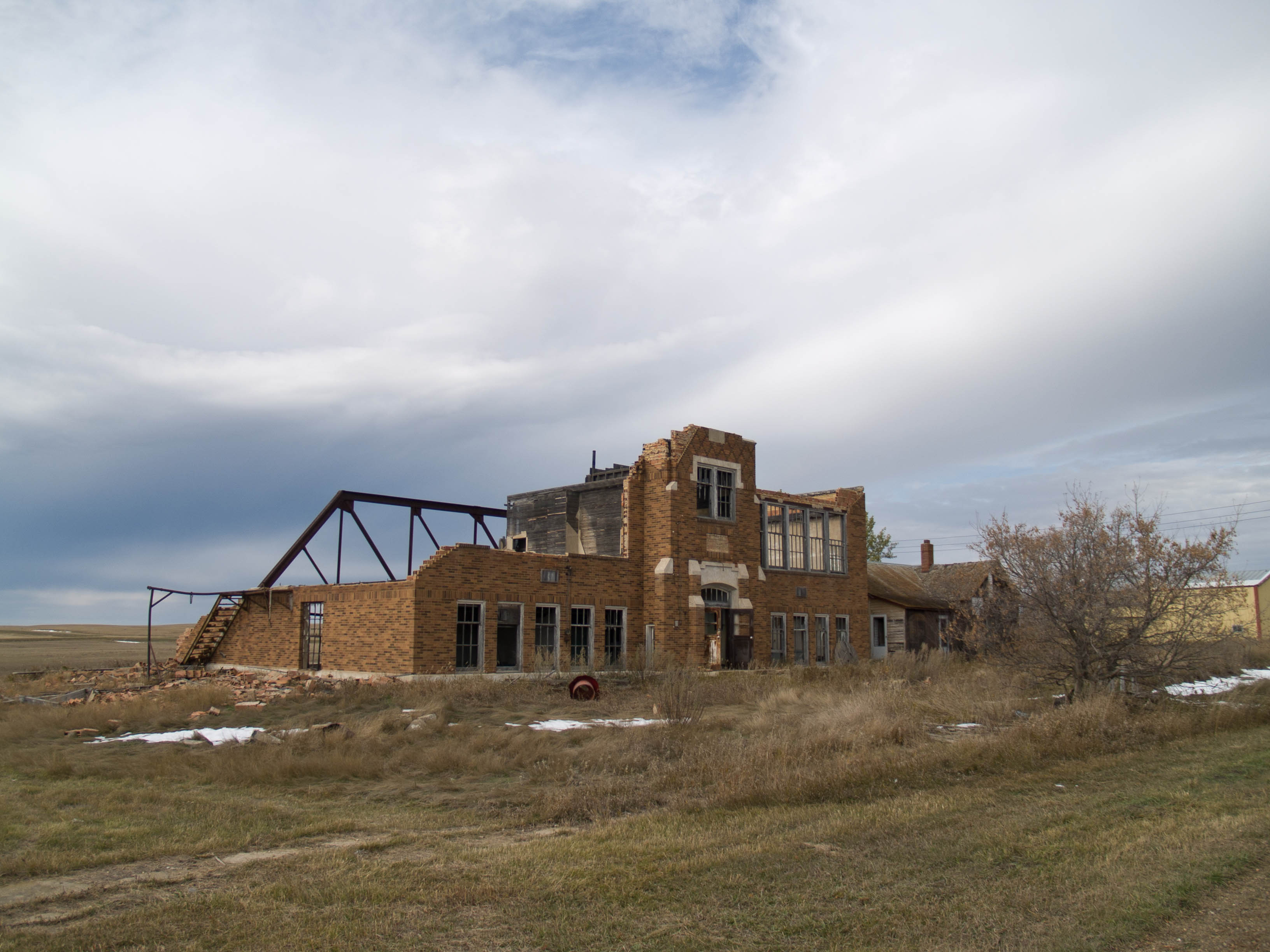
- Abandoned schoolhouse in Wheelock

- Location within the state of North Dakota
- Coordinates: 48°17′42″N 103°15′11″W
- Country: United States
- State: North Dakota
- County: Williams
- Elevation: 2,392 ft (729 m)
- Time zone: UTC-6 (Central (CST))
  - Summer (DST): UTC-5 (CDT)
- Area code: 701
- GNIS feature ID: 1036332

Wheelock is a ghost town in Wheelock Township, Williams County, in the northwestern part of the U.S. state of North Dakota. In 1938, the Federal Writers' Project found a population of 115 in Wheelock. In the 1990 census, the population was 23. All census population figures after 1990 are estimates. The town was disincorporated in 1994.

== History ==
Wheelock was founded in 1902 along the transcontinental rail line of the Great Northern Railway. The name comes from Ralph W. Wheelock, an editorial writer with the Minneapolis Tribune who wrote favorably about the site.

Unlike some ghost towns, Wheelock's homes, churches, and commercial buildings have the look of just recently being occupied. The paint is peeling, but it is still there. The grass is green, although it is not mowed. The roof of the two-story brick schoolhouse has caved in, carrying with it the back wall and exposing the four classrooms and the gymnasium roof girder. The town garage stands empty. A handful of commercial buildings and the church appear almost as if they could be occupied—but are unoccupied and deteriorating. The railroad track, now owned by BNSF Railway, still runs through town. Wheelock remains the location of a passing siding. Amtrak's Empire Builder, which operates between Seattle/Portland and Chicago, passes through the ghost town, but makes no stop. The nearest station is located in Williston, 26 miles (42 km) to the southwest. The grain elevator was razed in 2011/2012. The general store burned down in 2005. The school was razed in 2012/2013 for an unknown reason.

In January 2018, the former church was listed up for sale, with an asking price of $75,000. As of January 2019, it had not yet sold and was listed for $65,000.

Due to the North Dakota oil boom, the town has seen considerable growth since 2010, although there are still no businesses in operation.

Historical population
Census	Pop.	Note	%±
1930	115		—
1940	94		−18.3%
1950	101		7.4%
1960	82		−18.8%
1970	21		−74.4%
1980	34		61.9%
1990	23		−32.4%
2000	18		−21.7%
2010	12		−33.3%
2015 (est.)	29		141.7%
U.S. Decennial Census

== Climate ==
According to the Köppen Climate Classification system, Wheelock has a semi-arid climate, abbreviated "BSk" on climate maps.
