= Ukraina, North Dakota =

Ghost town in North Dakota, United States

Ukraina
- Ghost town
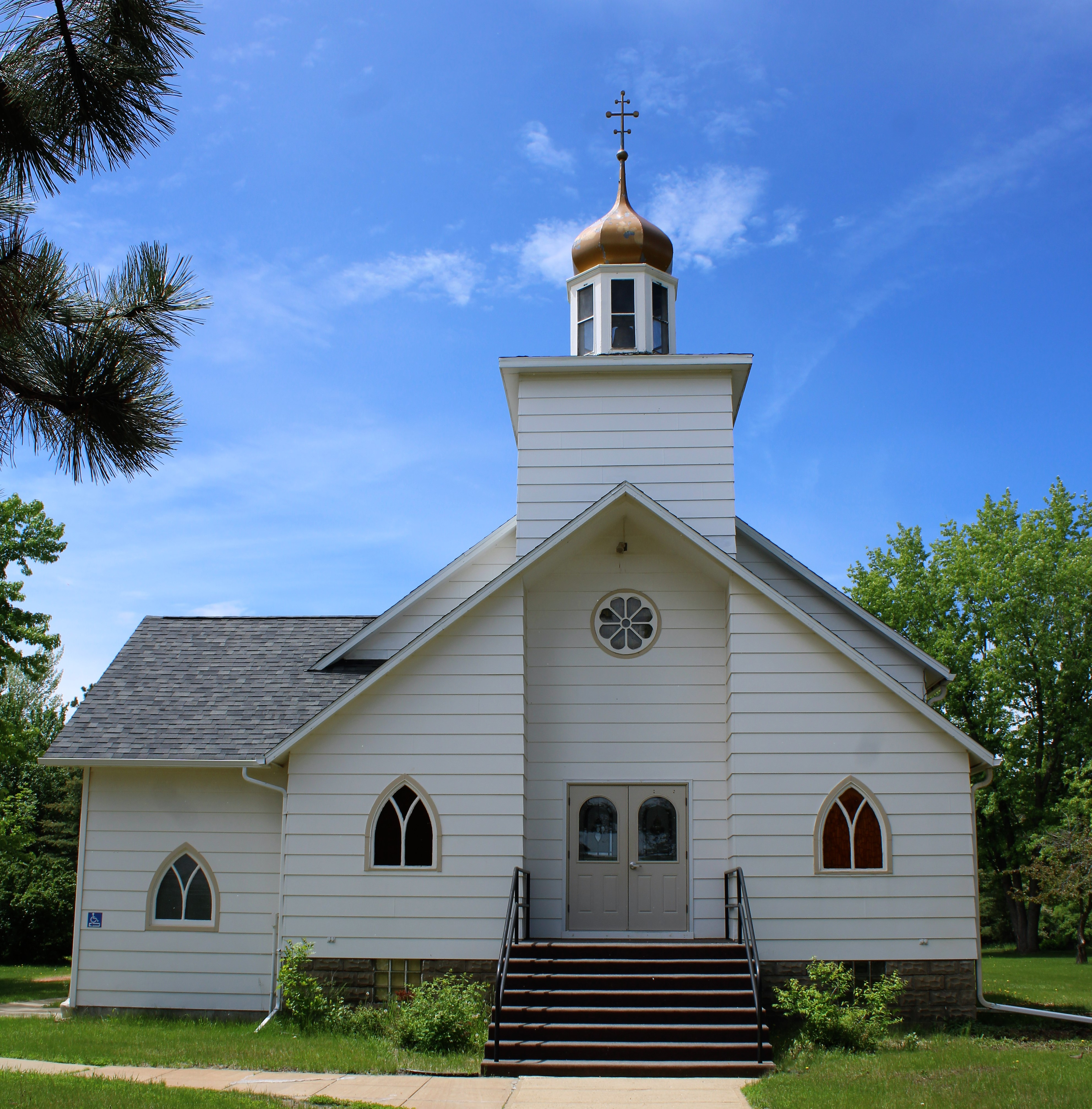
- St. Demetrius Ukrainian Catholic Church in Fairfield, which originally stood in Ukraina

- Location within North Dakota Location within the United States
- Coordinates: 47°03′11″N 103°06′34″W
- Country: United States
- State: North Dakota
- County: Billings
- Settled: c. 1906
- Abandoned: c. 1949
- Named for: Ukraine

Ukraina is a ghost town in Billings County, North Dakota, United States. In the early 20th century, was established by Ukrainian immigrants, who also established the nearby community of Gorham. It was named after the immigrants' homeland of Ukraine. Ukraina was the site of two churches, one Ukrainian Catholic and the other Eastern Orthodox, used by the local Ukrainian community. By 1949, the settlement had been abandoned and its churches moved to Gorham and Fairfield.

== Description ==
Ukraina was settled near the Green River in Billings County, North Dakota, 11 mi (18 km) north and 4 mi (6.4 km) east of Belfield and near Gorham. The settlement was named after Ukraine, where most of its residents had emigrated from.

== History ==
=== Establishment ===
During the late 19th century, a mass emigration of Ukrainians began. Settlement in North Dakota began with Belfield and then spread across Billings and McKenzie Counties. Many of these immigrants began arriving by way of Winnipeg, Canada, in 1896, and came from several Ukrainian villages, including Boryshkivtsi, Melnytsia-Podilska, and Okopy in Ternopil Oblast.

During this time, the village of Ukraina—named for the homeland—was established. Most of the area's early immigrants were of Ukrainian Catholic faith. The first place of worship—outside of holding services in homes—was at a wooden cross placed on top of a hill north of Ukraina and Belfield in 1902. The St. Demetrius Ukrainian Catholic Church was built in Ukraina beginning in 1905 and finished construction in 1906. A grocery store was established shortly after by Mike Bilynsky, and a second one later by Nick and Pete Strilchuk. A post office was then established by Joe Malkowski.

The village's main draw was as a religious hub, servicing hundreds of Ukrainians across the area. In 1912, St. Josephat Ukrainian Catholic Church was established in Gorham as a mission of St. Demetrius, and they initially shared a priest.

In the mid-1910s, a religious rift began forming. Because of Billings County's remote location, priests often had to travel long distances to perform religious ceremonies in the community. Ukraina and Gorham also shared their priest with Wilton, another Ukrainian community about 200 miles (320 km) away. On Easter Sunday 1916, after travelling to Wilton's Holy Trinity Ukrainian Greek Orthodox Church to bless Easter baskets and break their fast, the priest failed to return on time to do the same for Ukraina. This dispute ultimately ousted the priest from Ukraina; he then moved to the church in Gorham, causing enmity between the Catholics in both towns.

Ukraina later found a replacement in John Senchuk, but several months later found out that he was Eastern Orthodox. Some residents wanted to keep Senchuk, while others refused him. This led to the conversion of several locals and the creation of the St. Peter and Paul Ukrainian Orthodox Church in 1917, built directly across the street from the Catholic one; the Catholics stayed on the north side and the Orthodox settled on the south. Both churches served the community in a 20-mile radius. In 1928, a fire destroyed St. Demetrius Church, and the Catholics blamed the Orthodox residents, although foul play was never proven. A new rectory was built in 1929 and the new church was built in 1930, modelled after the original church's plan.

=== Abandonment ===
By the 1920s, Belfield was becoming the new center of Ukrainian culture in the area. Many older residents chose to retire there from their homesteads, while others gave up farming as a result of the Great Depression and entered new fields of work. A new Ukrainian Catholic parish church, St. John the Baptist, was built in Belfield in 1945. The establishment of rural post routes caused the post office to close. By the late 1940s, Ukraina was abandoned. St. Peter and Paul Church was moved to Belfield in 1948. St. Demetrius Church was moved next to St. Mary's Cemetery in Fairfield in 1949, where it continued to be run by then-pastor Michael Bobersky. Ukraina's general store and post office buildings also went to Belfield.

== See also ==
- List of ghost towns in North Dakota
