= Curlew Township, Morton County, North Dakota =

Curlew Township
- Former township
- Interactive map of Curlew Township
- Coordinates: 46°48′54″N 101°49′48″W
- Country: United States
- State: North Dakota
- County: Morton
- Established: 1923
- Dissolved: 1981

Curlew Township is a former township in Morton County, North Dakota, United States. It was located near Glen Ullin, North Dakota.

== History ==
Curlew Township was established in 1923 in survey township T139 North, R88 West, which was then part of the larger Classen Township. The township showed a population of 213 during the 1930 Census, but slowly reduced in size as parts of the township were annexed by Glen Ullin. The township was dissolved in 1981 with a population of 96.

Curlew was the name given to a loading station along the Northern Pacific Railroad near Almont, North Dakota in 1879. Little development took place at that site, but the name is shared by many other features in the area. Curlew Creek, now known as Big Muddy Creek, and Curlew Valley were so named due to the long-billed curlews that frequented the area. Curlew Valley's northwestern was located in Curlew Township. Other sources say the source of the name comes from a Captain Curlew, who was killed by Indians in the area.
