= Great Northern Railway Underpass =

- U.S. National Register of Historic Places
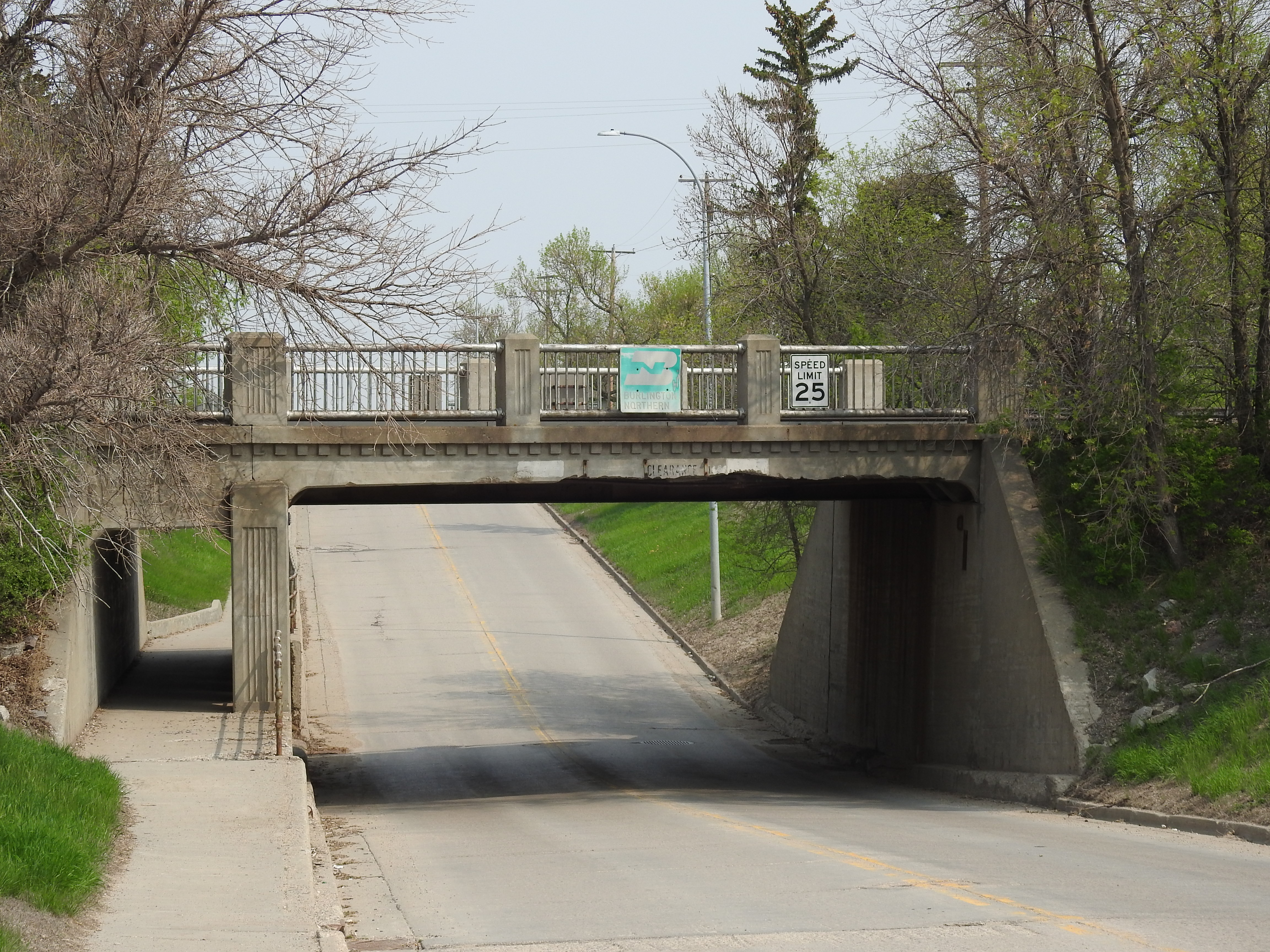

- Location within North Dakota Location within the United States
- Location: Burlington Northern Santa Fe Railway tracks, over ND 8, N end of Stanley, Stanley, North Dakota
- Coordinates: 48°19′11″N 102°23′24″W
- Area: less than one acre
- Built: 1937
- Architectural style: Concrete deck girder bridge, Other
- MPS: Historic Roadway Bridges of North Dakota MPS
- NRHP reference No.: 97000182
- Added to NRHP: February 27, 1997

The Great Northern Railway Underpass at Stanley, North Dakota is a concrete deck girder bridge that was built in 1937. It is listed on the National Register of Historic Places.

According to its nomination, the bridge "is a heavily-built single-span steel stringer design with a concrete substructure. This design saw common use in the numerous structures built to carry North Dakota roadways under railroad lines, generally beginning in the 1930s."
