= Verendrye, North Dakota =

Ghost town in North Dakota, U.S.

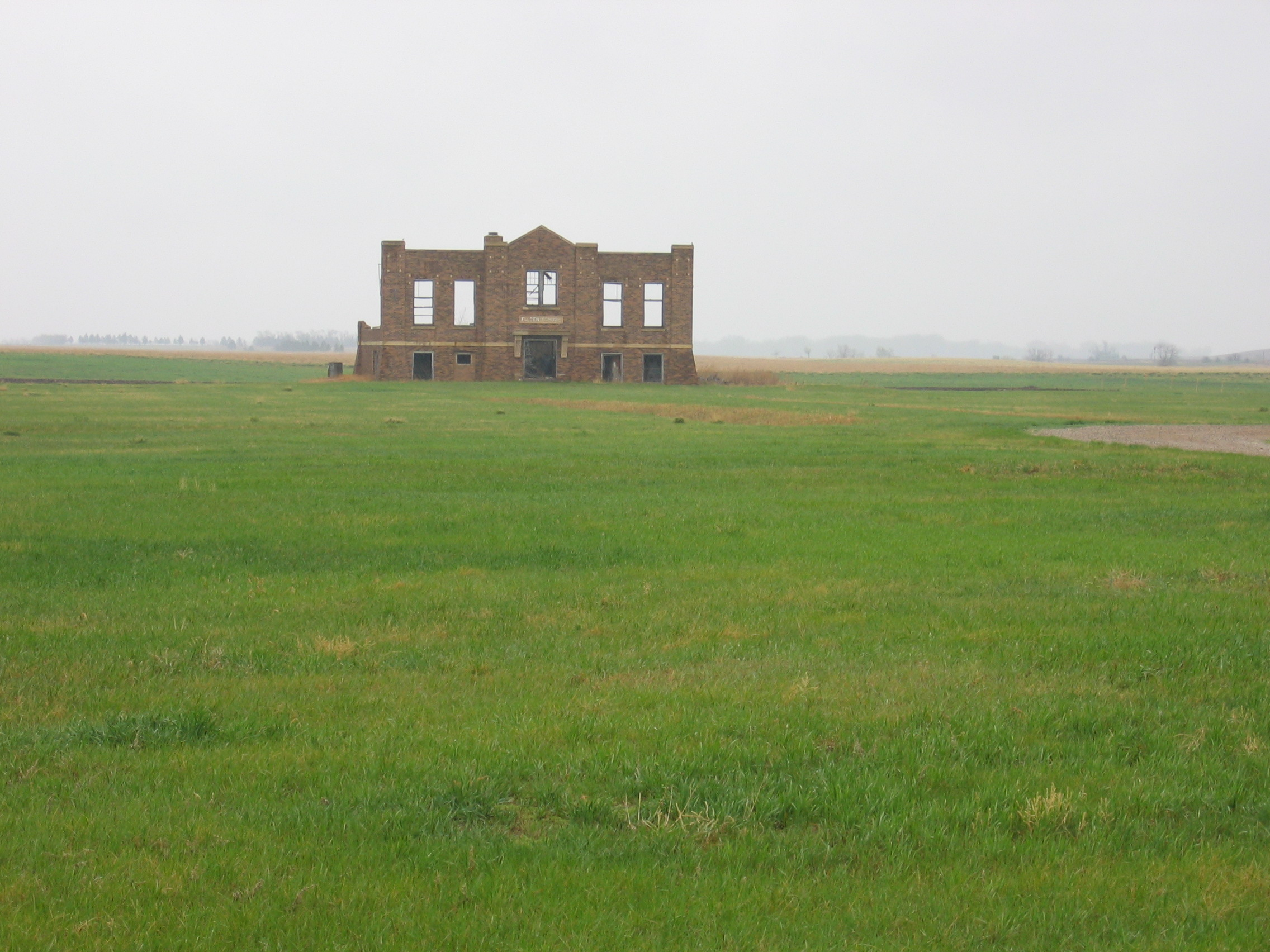
- Abandoned Falsen School

- Location within North Dakota Location within the United States
- Coordinates: 48°07′16″N 100°44′21″W

Verendrye was a historic unincorporated community in McHenry County, North Dakota, United States, located approximately eight miles (13 km) northwest of Karlsruhe and 13 miles (21 km) northeast of Velva within Falsen Township. Although classified by the USGS as a populated place, it is considered a ghost town.

== History ==
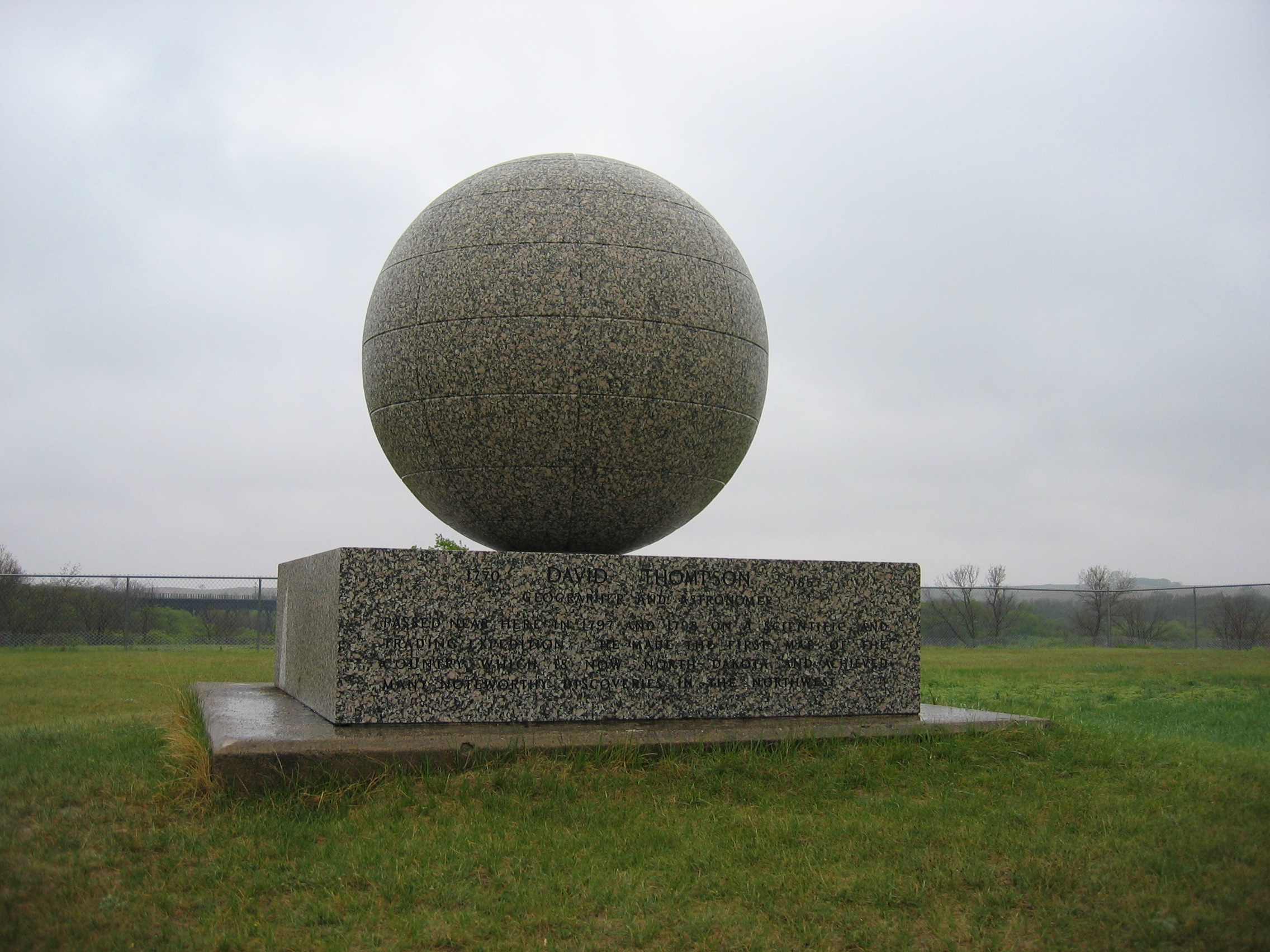
David Thompson Memorial

The community was first known as Falsen, founded in 1912 by Norwegian settlers, who named it for Norwegian statesman Christian Magnus Falsen. Falsen was also the name of the station on the Great Northern Railway. The post office was established with the name Falsen in 1913, but the name was changed in 1925 to honor Pierre de la Verendrye, an early French-Canadian explorer who was said to be the first non-Native American person to tour the North Dakota prairies. The population of Falsen in 1920 was 75. The population of Verendrye in 1938 was 100. When the railroad switched to diesel locomotives, regular stops by steam trains at Verendrye for water and coal were no longer needed, beginning Verendrye's decline. The post office closed in 1965, with mail being redirected to Bergen. The last residents moved away in 1970, and a farm now occupies the townsite; the facade of the abandoned Falsen School is located on the property.

Along with Norwegians, Falsen was originally settled by German-Russians from the villages of Kandel and Selz in Ukraine.

A monument to the later North West Company fur trader and explorer, David Thompson, erected by the Great Northern Railway in 1925, remains on a hilltop overlooking the former townsite.

The Verendrye Electric Cooperative was established here in 1939 but relocated to Velva in 1941.

== Geography ==
Verendrye is located in the Mouse River Valley along the route of the BNSF Railway.

== See also ==
- List of ghost towns in North Dakota
