= Leipzig, North Dakota =

Coordinates: 46.50558°N 101.86384°W

Leipzig is a ghost town in Grant County, North Dakota, United States. The community was abandoned in 1910 when it was bypassed by the Northern Pacific Railroad.

== History ==
The name "Leipzig" is a Slavic word that originated circa 1015 in Germany, meaning "a settlement by the lime trees." A settlement named Leipzig was founded in Bessarabia in 1844 by request of the Emperor of Austria. In 1896, 15 German-Russian Leipziger families travelled to the United States and started a new community named after their former home. In 1910, the Northern Pacific Railroad bypassed Leipzig and instead ran 11 miles to the southwest. The Leipzigers then moved their settlement to that location in May and founded New Leipzig.

== See also ==
- List of ghost towns in North Dakota
