= Charbonneau, North Dakota =

- Ghost town
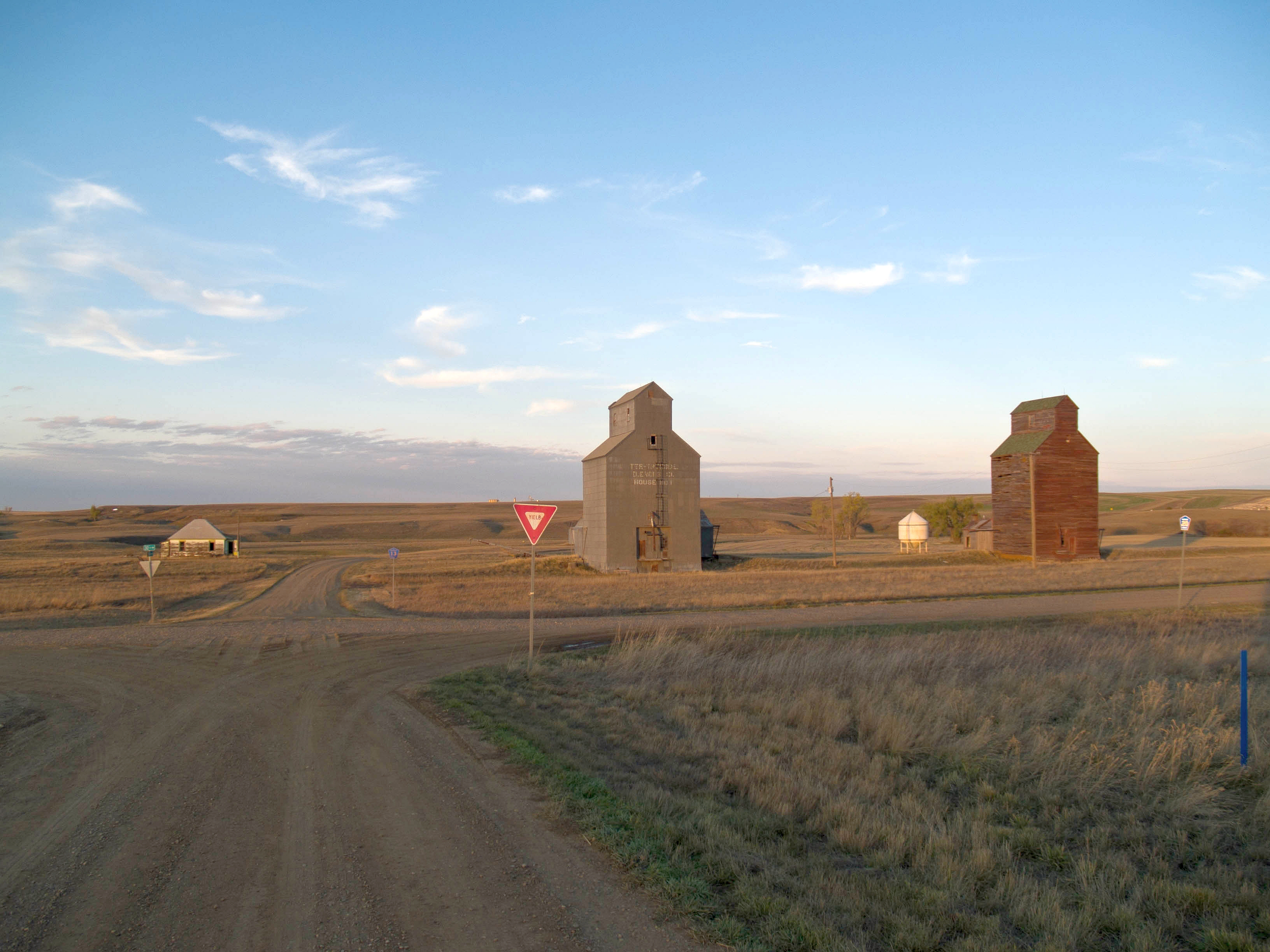
- Charbonneau, 2008

- Location within North Dakota Location within the United States
- Coordinates: 47°51′12″N 103°45′48″W
- Country: United States
- State: North Dakota
- County: McKenzie
- Elevation: 2,047 ft (624 m)
- Time zone: UTC-6 (Central (CST))
  - Summer (DST): UTC-5 (CDT)
- Area code: 701
- GNIS feature ID: 1034773

Charbonneau is a ghost town in northwestern McKenzie County, North Dakota, United States. It was abandoned when the post office was closed in the 1960s.

The town is approximately halfway between Alexander and Cartwright.
