= Mose, North Dakota =

Ghost town in North Dakota, U.S.

Coordinates: 47°34′43″N 98°27′17″W

Mose is a ghost town in Griggs County, in the U.S. state of North Dakota.

Founded in 1899, Mose is regularly known as "The Town That Blew Away" due to a large derecho which occurred on July 14, 1943.

== History ==
A post office was established at Mose in 1904, and was in operation until 1954. Mose had approximately 30 inhabitants in the 1930s. The town was largely destroyed due to a derecho that devastated the town, causing most inhabitants to move to other towns in the area.

== See also ==
- List of ghost towns in North Dakota
