= Sims, North Dakota =

- Ghost town
- Location within North Dakota Location within the United States
- Coordinates: 46°46′20″N 101°29′55″W
- Country: United States
- State: North Dakota
- County: Morton
- Elevation: 1,952 ft (595 m)
- Time zone: UTC-6 (Central (CST))
  - Summer (DST): UTC-5 (CDT)
- Area code: 701
- GNIS feature ID: 1033798

Sims is a ghost town in Morton County, North Dakota, United States. The town was founded in 1883.

At the site a Scandinavian Lutheran Church was built, its parsonage built in 1884. It remains still active, even as the rest of the town has declined. Today, the church has been restored and still worships every other Sunday. The church parsonage has also been restored and is home to the Sims Historical Society Museum.

During her trip to North Dakota in October 2008, First Lady Laura Bush visited Sims and toured its church. In 2002, local Almont residents had been given a grant to restore the church buildings from the North Dakota Save America's Treasures initiative, with First Lady Laura Bush being honorary chair 2003-2008.

== History ==
Sims was founded in 1883 as a coal town along the Northern Pacific Railway, who had reached Bismarck ten years earlier and now needed to take a detour to access coal and water. Coal mining and the town's brickyard helped Sims grow to a population of more than 1,000 people. However, the 1910 Census recorded a population of just 86 people. The population fluctuated over the years, with an estimated 98 people in 1940. The town is named after George Sims, a railroad executive.

The town's fortunes remained closely tied to the railway's, and when NP in 1947 straightened out their mainline (now that trains no longer needed as frequent servicing stops), Sims along with Almont was cut off from railroad access.

The post office was founded in 1883 and closed in 1947, with mail routed through Almont, to the south.

Sims Scandinavian Lutheran Church was built in 1896 and completed in 1900. An earlier 1884 combination church and residence remains today as the parsonage to the church. The church is reportedly North Dakota's oldest Lutheran church west of the Missouri River. The congregation still has roughly 50 members, even though they do not live in Sims. Locals report, however, that the town does have one remaining resident: a former pastor's wife who died between 1916 and 1918. Dubbed the "Gray Lady Ghost," her spirit is reported to haunt the old parsonage, wandering the rooms and playing the organ.

The last residence in Sims, a mobile home in the center of town, was occupied in 2005, but looked vacant by 2010, and was removed by 2012.
