= Captain's Landing Township, Morton County, North Dakota =

Township in Morton County, North Dakota

Captain's Landing Township
- Township
- Location within North Dakota
- Coordinates: 46°48′49.5″N 100°49′41″W
- Country: United States
- State: North Dakota
- County: Grand Forks

Area
  - Total: 0.45 sq mi (1.17 km^{2})
  - Land: 0.32 sq mi (0.84 km^{2})
  - Water: 0.13 sq mi (0.33 km^{2})
- Elevation: 1,641 ft (500 m)

Population (2020)
  - Total: 115
  - Density: 350/sq mi (140/km^{2})
- Time zone: UTC-6 (Central (CST))
  - Summer (DST): UTC-5 (CDT)
- ZIP code: 58554 (Mandan)
- Area code: 701
- FIPS code: 38-12080
- GNIS feature ID: 1759547

Captain's Landing Township is the only township in Morton County, North Dakota, United States. The population as of the 2020 census was 115. It is located east of Mandan, North Dakota along the Missouri River, between Interstate 94 and the Bismarck Expressway.

== History ==
Captain's Landing Township was organized in 1980 with a population of 8 people and just 3 homes, growing to 138 people and 46 homes by the 1990 census.

== Geography ==
According to the United States Census Bureau, the township has a total area of 0.452 square miles (1.17 km^{2}), of which 0.324 square miles (0.84 km^{2}) is land and 0.128 square miles (0.33 km^{2}) is water, making it the smallest organized subdivision in the county.

== Demographics ==
Historical population
Census	Pop.	Note	%±
1980	8		—
1990	138		1,625.0%
2000	153		10.9%
2010	137		−10.5%
2020	115		−16.1%
2024 (est.)	130		13.0%
U.S. Decennial Census; 2020 Census

As of the 2000 census, there were 153 people, 56 households, and 54 families residing in the township. The population density was 449.3 square miles (1,164 km^{2}). There were 57 housing units, including one vacant, at an average density of 167.4 square miles (434 km^{2}). The racial makeup of the township was 100.0% White. The top two ancestry groups in the township were German with 51.7%, followed by Russian with 21.2%.

Of the 56 households in the township, 32.1% had children under the age of 18 living with them, 94.6% were married couples living together. Only 3.6% were non-families. The average household size was 2.73 and the average family size was 2.76.

The township's population was spread out, with 19.0% under the age of 18, 8.5% from 18 to 24, 22.9% from 25 to 44, 38.6% from 45 to 64, and 11.1% who were 65 years of age or older. The median age was 45 years. For every 100 females, there were 98.7 males. For every 100 females age 18 and over, there were 70.6 males.

The median household and family income for the township $42,083. Males had a median income of $50,526 versus $38,214 for females, with a per capita income of $18,884. About 11.3% of population was below the poverty line.
