= Williston station =

Williston, ND
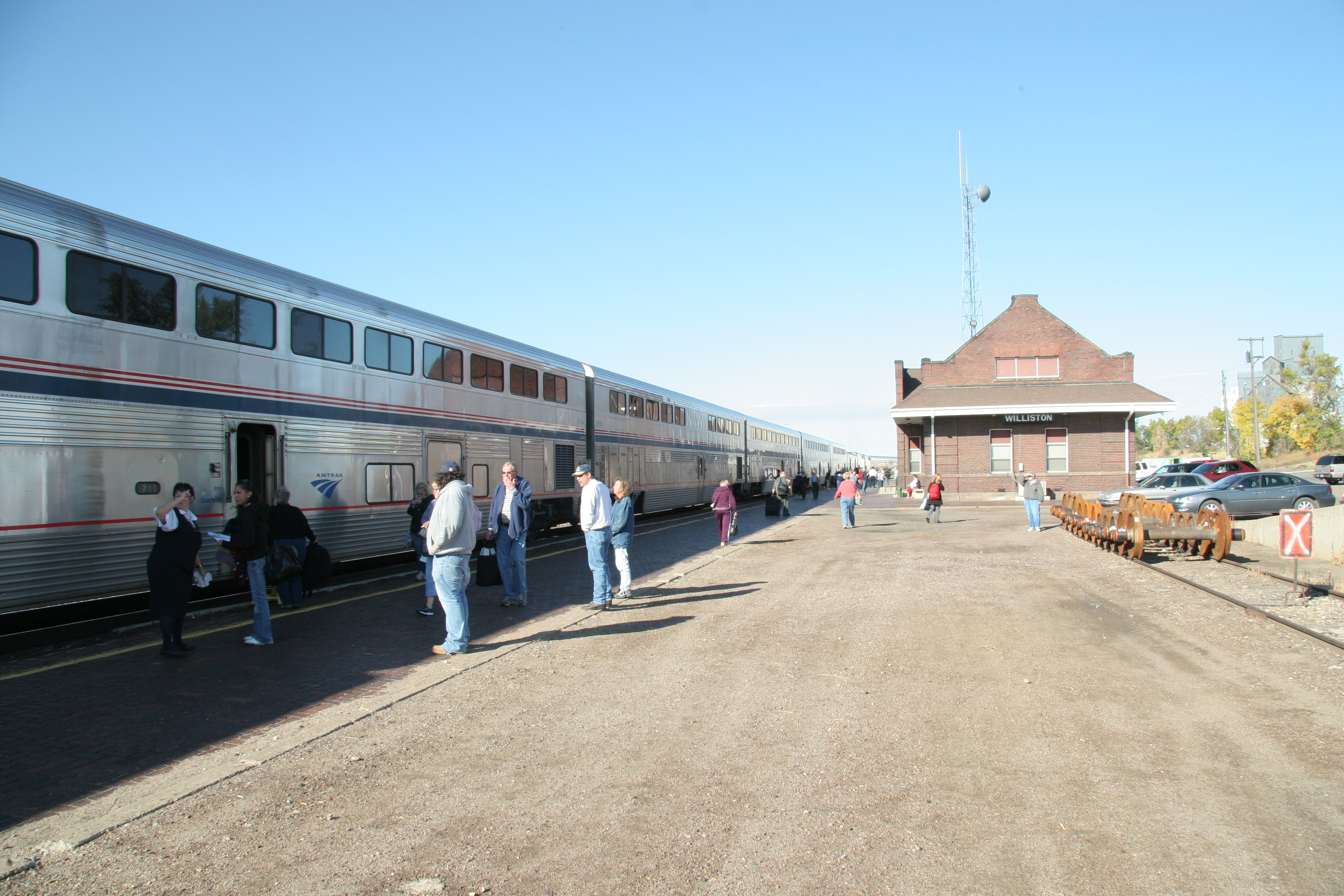

General information
- Location: 1 South Main Street; Williston, North Dakota; United States
- Coordinates: 48.1429°N 103.6211°W
- Owner: BNSF Railway
- Line: BNSF Glasgow Subdivision
- Platforms: 1 side platform
- Tracks: 8

Construction
- Parking: Yes
- Accessible: Yes

Other information
- Station code: Amtrak: WTN

History
- Opened: 1887
- Rebuilt: 1910, 2010

Passengers
- FY 2025: 16,556 (Amtrak)

Services
Preceding station	Amtrak	Following station
Wolf Point toward Seattle or Portland	Empire Builder	Stanley toward Chicago
Former services
Preceding station	Great Northern Railway	Following station
Trenton toward Seattle	Main Line	Avoca toward St. Paul
Location

Williston station is a train station in Williston, North Dakota, served by Amtrak's Empire Builder line. The brick station was built in 1910 by the Great Northern Railway and is located at the southern end of Williston's downtown. An interior and exterior restoration, begun in 2010 and costing almost $2 million, has returned the station to its original look.

With the opening of the Bakken oil fields in the 21st century, many oil production workers now also board and detrain in Williston, adding additional passengers to the route. Many workers from as far as the Pacific Northwest opt to travel to their jobs via the station rather than fly or take the bus. Amtrak conductors frequently let passengers use Williston as an unofficial smoke break or fresh air stop, partly due to delays caused by the sheer volume of passengers boarding and alighting at the station.

Ridership at the station had a particular spike in Amtrak's 2012 fiscal year, when ridership grew by almost 82 percent to 54,324 from 29,920 the year before (though 2011 ridership had been partly degraded due to flooding along the route). This patronage continued even in the wake of terrible delays that plagued the Empire Builder for much of 2013 and 2014 due to increased freight traffic related to the Bakken boom.

In 2025, Amtrak completed a $10 million renovation of the station to improve accessibility. The project included a 700-foot (210 m)-long platform with a snowmelt system.
