= Fryburg, North Dakota =

- Unincorporated community
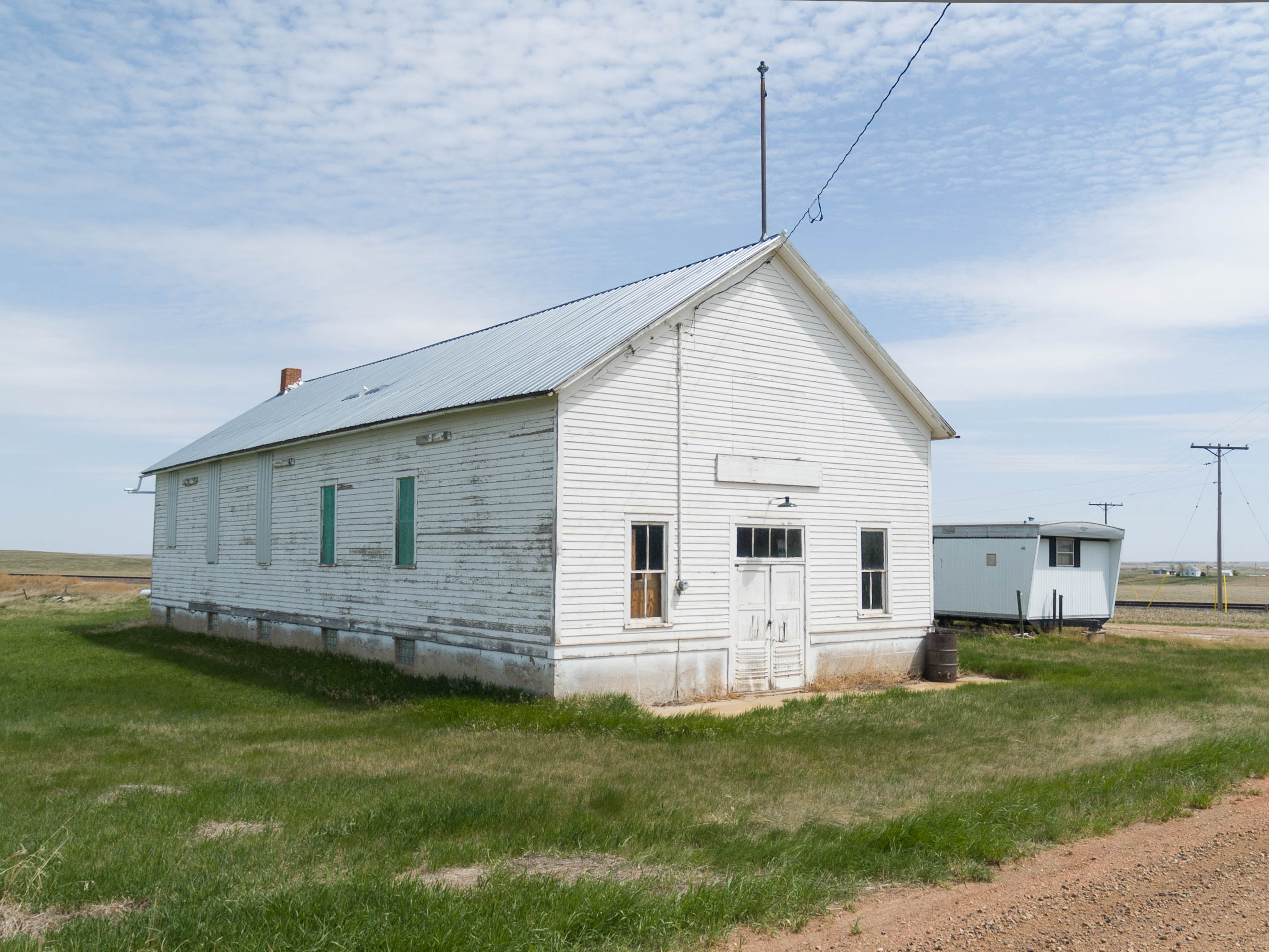
- Buildings in Fryburg

- Location within the state of North Dakota
- Coordinates: 46°52′14″N 103°18′11″W
- Country: United States
- State: North Dakota
- County: Billings
- Elevation: 2,786 ft (849 m)
- Time zone: UTC-7 (Mountain (MST))
  - Summer (DST): UTC-6 (MDT)
- Area code: 701
- GNIS feature ID: 1034880

Fryburg is an unincorporated community in Billings County, North Dakota, United States. The Fryburg oil field is located here.

== History ==
Fryburg was named for General James Barnet Fry, the United States Army Provost Marshal General at the start of the American Civil War. The population was 50 in 1940.
