= Gorham, North Dakota =

- Unincorporated community
- Location within the state of North Dakota Gorham, North Dakota (the United States)
- Coordinates: 47°08′55″N 103°18′27″W
- Country: United States
- State: North Dakota
- County: Billings
- Founded: c. 1899
- Abandoned: 1972
- Elevation: 2,749 ft (838 m)
- Time zone: UTC-7 (Mountain (MST))
  - Summer (DST): UTC-6 (MDT)
- Area code: 701
- GNIS feature ID: 1034889

Gorham is an unincorporated community and ghost town in Billings County, North Dakota, United States. The community was founded c. 1899 and became heavily populated by Ukrainian immigrants. Gorham served as a hub for the rural community, containing a Ukrainian Catholic church, general store, post office, and other businesses. The town was officially abandoned in 1972, although rural farms still exist in the locale.

== Name ==
Gorham was named after Fred E. Gorham, an early rancher in the area. Gorham also served as a commissioner in Billings County.

=== Founding ===
Gorham was one of several villages founded by Ukrainian immigrants in western North Dakota around 1896. Ukrainians from the historical region of Galicia began emigrating en masse beginning in the late 19th century to escape severe poverty, overpopulation, and tenant farming policies. About 1,200 Ukrainians stopped in Winnipeg, Canada, before proceeding on to North Dakota. Hundreds chose to settle in Belfield, North Dakota and the surrounding rural countryside, particularly in Billings County. Villages of origin for these Ukrainians included Bilivtsi, Boryshkivtsi, Melnytsia-Podilska, and Okopy, all now located in Chortkiv Raion, Ternopil Oblast.

=== Growth ===
A post office was established in Gorham on July 28, 1899, and Thomas Jefferson McDonald served as the postmaster. The original post office was closed on April 12, 1905. In 1917, several leaders in the local agricultural industry formed a co-operative store in a two-story building, which hosted the store and post office on the first floor and a private residence on the second. The store burned down in January 1918 but was rebuilt, the following year reopening as the General Merchandise Store. A new joint store and post office building was constructed across the street in 1920. The Baranko family purchased the store in 1940; John and Olga Baranko ran it until 1947, when their son Mike took over the business and operated it until 1972. At other times, Gorham also contained a livery, creamery, saloon, and a blacksmith shop.

Most of the Ukrainians were of Ukrainian Catholic faith and soon began setting up places of worship. Although the first church was established in 1906 at Ukraina, one at Gorham—St. Josephat Ukrainian Catholic Church—was created in 1912 as a mission of St. Demetrius. The two communities frequently shared a pastor, who first lived at St. Josaphat before a rectory was built at Ukraina. By 1916, however, a schism was forming between the two churches. One dispute occurred when, on Easter Sunday of that year, the Ukrainian Catholics at Ukraina ousted their priest due to his failure to arrive on time to bless their Easter baskets; when Gorham asked him to become their priest and he accepted, Catholics in the two communities began to resent one another.

At its peak in 1937, the community of Gorham was home to five families and up to 40 people.

=== Decline and abandonment ===
Gorham began to decline in the 1930s. As in other local agrarian communities, many ranchers and farmers retired to larger communities like Belfield, or took up new occupations. In 1972, the United States Post Office decided to consolidate the Gorham and Fairfield post offices; the new one was built by Mike Baranko in Fairfield in 1972, at which point the townsite became officially deserted. The old store and post office building was relocated to the Prairie Outpost Park in Dickinson in 1984. With the last remaining building gone, Gorham was officially removed from North Dakota state maps in 1994.
