= Billings County, North Dakota =

County in North Dakota, United States

- County
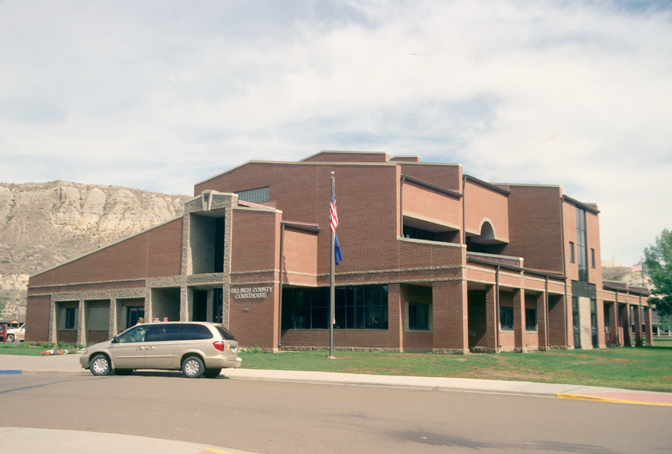
- The Billings County Courthouse in Medora

- Location within the U.S. state of North Dakota
- Coordinates: 47.007044°N 103.364016°W
- Country: United States
- State: North Dakota
- Founded: February 10, 1879 (created); May 4, 1886 (organized)
- Named for: Frederick H. Billings
- Seat: Medora
- Largest city: Medora

Area
  - Total: 1,153.116 sq mi (2,986.56 km^{2})
  - Land: 1,148.488 sq mi (2,974.57 km^{2})
  - Water: 4.628 sq mi (11.99 km^{2}) 0.40%

Population (2020)
  - Total: 945
  - Estimate (2025): 1,071 ▲
  - Density: 0.926/sq mi (0.358/km^{2})
- Time zone: UTC−7 (Mountain)
  - Summer (DST): UTC−6 (MDT)
- Area code: 701
- Congressional district: At-large
- Website: billingscountynd.gov

Billings County is a county in the U.S. state of North Dakota. As of the 2020 census, the population was 945, and was estimated to be 1,071 in 2025, making it the second-least populous county in North Dakota. The county seat and only incorporated place is Medora.

The Territorial legislature authorized the creation of Billings County on February 10, 1879, naming it for Northern Pacific Railway president Frederick H. Billings. It was organized on May 4, 1886. The original county boundary was significantly altered by actions in 1883, 1885, 1887, 1896, 1901, and 1904. Its most significant alterations came in 1907 (Bowman County partitioned off), 1912 (Golden Valley County partitioned off), and 1914 (Slope County partitioned off).

== Geography ==
The Little Missouri River flows northward through the western portion of the county. Bullion Creek flows eastward into the southwestern corner of the county to discharge into the Little Missouri River.

Billings County terrain consists of rugged semi-arid hills in its western portion, giving way to more level ground in the east. The terrain slopes to the east and south, with its highest terrain along its west boundary line, at 2,523 ft (769 m) ASL.

According to the United States Census Bureau, the county has a total area of 1,153.116 square miles (2,986.56 km^{2}), of which 1,148.488 square miles (2,974.57 km^{2}) is land and 4.628 square miles (11.99 km^{2}) (0.40%) is water. It is the 28th largest county in North Dakota by total area. The South Unit of Theodore Roosevelt National Park lies in the central part of the county, just north of Medora.

=== Major highways ===
- Interstate 94
- U.S. Highway 85

=== Adjacent counties ===
- McKenzie County – north
- Dunn County – northeast
- Stark County – east
- Slope County – south
- Golden Valley County – west

=== Protected areas ===
- Little Missouri National Grassland (part)
- Rough Rider State Park
- Theodore Roosevelt National Park (South Unit)

== Demographics ==
Historical population
Census	Pop.	Note	%±
1880	1,323		—
1890	170		−87.2%
1900	975		473.5%
1910	10,186		944.7%
1920	3,126		−69.3%
1930	3,140		0.4%
1940	2,531		−19.4%
1950	1,777		−29.8%
1960	1,513		−14.9%
1970	1,198		−20.8%
1980	1,138		−5.0%
1990	1,108		−2.6%
2000	888		−19.9%
2010	783		−11.8%
2020	945		20.7%
2025 (est.)	1,071	▲	13.3%
U.S. Decennial Census; 1790–1960 1900–1990; 1990–2000 2010–2020 (Note: The total for 1910 includes populations (8,009) of townships taken to form Golden Valley in 1912, and Slope Counties in 1915.)

As of the fourth quarter of 2024, the median home value in Billings County was $341,706. As of the 2023 American Community Survey, there are 372 estimated households in Billings County with an average of 2.49 persons per household. The county has a median household income of $81,250. Approximately 10.5% of the county's population lives at or below the poverty line. Billings County has an estimated 62.1% employment rate, with 32.4% of the population holding a bachelor's degree or higher and 94.6% holding a high school diploma.

The top five reported ancestries (people were allowed to report up to two ancestries, thus the figures will generally add to more than 100%) were English (97.9%), Spanish (0.3%), Indo-European (1.8%), Asian and Pacific Islander (0.0%), and Other (0.0%). The median age in the county was 44.7 years.

Billings County, North Dakota – racial and ethnic composition
Note: the US Census treats Hispanic/Latino as an ethnic category. This table excludes Latinos from the racial categories and assigns them to a separate category. Hispanics/Latinos may be of any race.

Race / ethnicity (NH = non-Hispanic)	Pop. 1980	Pop. 1990	Pop. 2000	Pop. 2010	Pop. 2020
White alone (NH)	1,132 (99.47%)	1,105 (99.73%)	874 (98.42%)	771 (98.47%)	902 (95.45%)
Black or African American alone (NH)	0 (0.00%)	0 (0.00%)	0 (0.00%)	0 (0.00%)	4 (0.42%)
Native American or Alaska Native alone (NH)	4 (0.35%)	3 (0.27%)	1 (0.11%)	3 (0.38%)	3 (0.32%)
Asian alone (NH)	0 (0.00%)	0 (0.00%)	0 (0.00%)	4 (0.51%)	6 (0.63%)
Pacific Islander alone (NH)	—	—	1 (0.11%)	0 (0.00%)	0 (0.00%)
Other race alone (NH)	0 (0.00%)	0 (0.00%)	1 (0.11%)	0 (0.00%)	0 (0.00%)
Mixed race or multiracial (NH)	—	—	8 (0.90%)	1 (0.13%)	8 (0.85%)
Hispanic or Latino (any race)	2 (0.18%)	0 (0.00%)	3 (0.34%)	4 (0.51%)	22 (2.33%)
Total	1,138 (100.00%)	1,108 (100.00%)	888 (100.00%)	783 (100.00%)	945 (100.00%)

=== 2023 estimate ===
As of the 2023 estimate, there were 1,034 people and 372 households residing in the county. There were 609 housing units at an average density of 0.53 per square mile (0.2/km^{2}). The racial makeup of the county was 93.9% White (91.9% NH White), 1.4% African American, 0.9% Native American, 3.2% Asian, 0.1% Pacific Islander, _% from some other races and 0.6% from two or more races. Hispanic or Latino people of any race were 2.8% of the population.

=== 2020 census ===
As of the 2020 census, there were 945 people, 406 households, and 271 families residing in the county. The population density was 0.8 inhabitants per square mile (0.3/km^{2}). There were 567 housing units at an average density of 0.49 per square mile (0.2/km^{2}), of which 28.4% were vacant. Among occupied housing units, 75.4% were owner-occupied and 24.6% were renter-occupied. The homeowner vacancy rate was 1.5% and the rental vacancy rate was 6.5%.

Of the residents, 22.0% were under the age of 18 and 20.0% were 65 years of age or older; the median age was 44.0 years. For every 100 females there were 110.9 males, and for every 100 females age 18 and over there were 112.4 males.

The racial makeup of the county was 96.4% White, 0.4% Black or African American, 0.5% American Indian and Alaska Native, 0.6% Asian, 0.0% from some other race, and 2.0% from two or more races. Hispanic or Latino residents of any race comprised 2.3% of the population.

There were 406 households in the county, of which 26.6% had children under the age of 18 living with them and 13.8% had a female householder with no spouse or partner present. About 26.1% of all households were made up of individuals and 8.6% had someone living alone who was 65 years of age or older.

=== 2010 census ===
As of the 2010 census, there were 783 people, 358 households, and 223 families residing in the county. The population density was 0.7 inhabitants per square mile (0.3/km^{2}). There were 484 housing units at an average density of 0.42 per square mile (0.2/km^{2}). The racial makeup of the county was 98.60% White, 0.26% African American, 0.38% Native American, 0.51% Asian, 0.00% Pacific Islander, 0.13% from some other races and 0.13% from two or more races. Hispanic or Latino people of any race were 0.51% of the population. In terms of ancestry, 40.6% were German, 19.1% were Ukrainian, 17.7% were Norwegian, 9.3% were Irish, 7.4% were Russian, 5.0% were English, and 0.9% were American.

There were 358 households, 19.0% had children under the age of 18 living with them, 56.1% were married couples living together, 1.7% had a female householder with no husband present, 37.7% were non-families, and 33.2% of all households were made up of individuals. The average household size was 2.16 and the average family size was 2.72. The median age was 48.6 years.

The median income for a household in the county was $51,923 and the median income for a family was $61,250. Males had a median income of $46,806 versus $31,250 for females. The per capita income for the county was $28,666. About 6.8% of families and 8.3% of the population were below the poverty line, including 11.9% of those under age 18 and 4.5% of those age 65 or over.

== Politics ==
Billings County voters have been traditionally Republican. In each of the last seven elections (as of 2024) the Republican candidate has received over seventy percent of the county's vote. However, it has some third party or independent interest. Billings county gave Ross Perot over twenty percent of the vote in his 1992 and 1996 campaigns. Pat Buchanan received approximately six percent of the vote when he ran as the Reform Party's candidate in 2000.

United States presidential election results for Billings County, North Dakota (Note: In 1912, the leading "other" candidate, Progressive Theodore Roosevelt, received 495 votes, while Socialist candidate Eugene Debs received 161 votes and Prohibition candidate Eugene Chafin received 25 votes.)
Year	Republican		Democratic		Third party(ies)	
Year	No.	%	No.	%	No.	%
1900	158	74.18%	51	23.94%	4	1.88%
1904	256	85.05%	37	12.29%	8	2.66%
1908	768	73.70%	236	22.65%	38	3.65%
1912	671	35.33%	547	28.80%	681	35.86%
1916	306	49.12%	276	44.30%	41	6.58%
1920	787	91.51%	61	7.09%	12	1.40%
1924	421	48.34%	32	3.67%	418	47.99%
1928	458	52.22%	412	46.98%	7	0.80%
1932	295	27.34%	760	70.44%	24	2.22%
1936	329	26.70%	729	59.17%	174	14.12%
1940	663	62.08%	404	37.83%	1	0.09%
1944	354	62.54%	209	36.93%	3	0.53%
1948	372	50.54%	311	42.26%	53	7.20%
1952	674	82.00%	143	17.40%	5	0.61%
1956	437	63.43%	248	35.99%	4	0.58%
1960	368	47.92%	400	52.08%	0	0.00%
1964	340	49.42%	348	50.58%	0	0.00%
1968	395	61.91%	174	27.27%	69	10.82%
1972	509	69.82%	192	26.34%	28	3.84%
1976	351	51.32%	285	41.67%	48	7.02%
1980	524	76.05%	122	17.71%	43	6.24%
1984	505	77.34%	133	20.37%	15	2.30%
1988	437	66.31%	211	32.02%	11	1.67%
1992	279	41.15%	123	18.14%	276	40.71%
1996	281	55.42%	116	22.88%	110	21.70%
2000	394	75.05%	82	15.62%	49	9.33%
2004	449	79.61%	99	17.55%	16	2.84%
2008	375	75.15%	114	22.85%	10	2.00%
2012	472	81.66%	89	15.40%	17	2.94%
2016	495	81.82%	59	9.75%	51	8.43%
2020	541	85.20%	72	11.34%	22	3.46%
2024	543	83.93%	93	14.37%	11	1.70%

== Recreation ==
The Bully Pulpit Golf Course is located three miles south of Medora and the Maah Daah Hey Trail single track non-motorized trail starts 30 miles south of Medora.

== Communities ==
=== City ===
- Medora (county seat)

=== Unorganized Territories ===
There are no townships in Billings County, but the United States Census Bureau divides the county into two unorganized territories:

- North Billings, which consists of all of the county north of I-94, had a population of 566 at the 2020 census.
- South Billings, which consists of all of the county south of I-94 outside Medora, had a population of 258 at the 2020 Census.

=== Unincorporated communities ===
- Fairfield
- Gorham
- Fryburg
- Sully Springs

=== Ghost towns ===
- Ukraina

== See also ==
- National Register of Historic Places listings in Billings County, North Dakota
