= Glen Ullin, North Dakota =

- City
- Interactive map of Glen Ullin, North Dakota
- Location within North Dakota
- Coordinates: 46.8117°N 101.8335°W
- Country: United States
- State: North Dakota
- County: Morton
- Metro: Bismarck–Mandan
- Founded: 1883
- Platted: August 6, 1883
- Incorporated (village): March 9, 1901
- Incorporated (city): 1910

Government
  - Type: Mayor–council
  - Mayor: Doug Martwick
  - President: Brent Swanson
  - Vice president: Chasity Wood
  - Councilmen: Kevin Emter; Wayne Fitterer; Preston Foss; Wade Kottre

Area
  - Total: 1.050 sq mi (2.719 km^{2})
  - Land: 1.018 sq mi (2.637 km^{2})
  - Water: 0.032 sq mi (0.083 km^{2}) 3.05%
- Elevation: 2,096 ft (639 m)

Population (2020)
  - Total: 732
  - Estimate (2025): 708
  - Density: 719/sq mi (278/km^{2})
- Time zone: UTC–6 (Central (CST))
  - Summer (DST): UTC–5 (CDT)
- ZIP Code: 58631
- Area code: 701
- FIPS code: 38-30860
- GNIS feature ID: 1036058
- Highway: ND 49
- Website: cityofglenullin.com

Glen Ullin is a city in Morton County, North Dakota, United States. The population was 732 as of the 2020 census, and was estimated at 708 in 2025. It is part of the "Bismarck metropolitan area" or "Bismarck–Mandan".

== History ==
Glen Ullin was founded in 1883 along the transcontinental route of the Northern Pacific Railway. The name was created by Major Alvan E. Bovay, a Northern Pacific land agent at the time. Glen, the Scottish Gaelic word for "valley," was chosen because of the city's location within a valley, while Ullin was taken from the Thomas Campbell poem Lord Ullin's Daughter. Glen Ullin was originally built up chiefly by Germans from Russia.

== Geography ==
According to the United States Census Bureau, the city has an area of 1.050 square miles (2.72 km^{2}), of which 1.018 square miles (2.64 km^{2}) is land and 0.032 square miles (0.08 km^{2}) (3.05%) is water.

== Demographics ==
Historical population
Census	Pop.	Note	%±
1910	921		—
1920	875		−5.0%
1930	950		8.6%
1940	976		2.7%
1950	1,324		35.7%
1960	1,210		−8.6%
1970	1,070		−11.6%
1980	1,125		5.1%
1990	927		−17.6%
2000	865		−6.7%
2010	807		−6.7%
2020	732		−9.3%
2025 (est.)	708		−3.3%
U.S. Decennial Census; 2020 Census

According to realtor website Zillow, the average price of a home as of June 30, 2026, in Glen Ullin was $152,767.

As of the 2024 American Community Survey, there were 350 estimated households in Glen Ullin with an average of 1.82 persons per household. The city has a median household income of $50,357. Approximately 8.5% of the city's population lives at or below the poverty line. Glen Ullin has an estimated 47.7% employment rate, with 10.9% of the population holding a bachelor's degree or higher and 89.8% holding a high school diploma. There were 430 housing units at an average density of 422.40 per square mile (163.1/km^{2}).

The top five reported languages (people were allowed to report up to two languages, thus the figures will generally add to more than 100%) were English (94.0%), Spanish (0.3%), Indo-European (3.4%), Asian and Pacific Islander (1.7%), and Other (0.6%).

The median age in the city was 55.2 years.

Glen Ullin, North Dakota – racial and ethnic composition Note: the US Census treats Hispanic/Latino as an ethnic category. This table excludes Latinos from the racial categories and assigns them to a separate category. Hispanics/Latinos may be of any race.
Race / ethnicity (NH = non-Hispanic)	Pop. 2000	Pop. 2010	Pop. 2020	% 2000	% 2010	% 2020
White alone (NH)	860	785	682	99.42%	97.27%	93.17%
Black or African American alone (NH)	0	0	7	0.00%	0.00%	0.96%
Native American or Alaska Native alone (NH)	2	4	7	0.23%	0.50%	0.96%
Asian alone (NH)	0	2	0	0.00%	0.25%	0.00%
Pacific Islander alone (NH)	0	2	4	0.00%	0.25%	0.55%
Other race alone (NH)	0	0	0	0.00%	0.00%	0.00%
Mixed race or multiracial (NH)	3	11	15	0.35%	1.36%	2.05%
Hispanic or Latino (any race)	0	3	17	0.00%	0.37%	2.32%
Total	865	807	732	100.00%	100.00%	100.00%

=== 2020 census ===
As of the 2020 census, there were 732 people, 339 households, and 179 families residing in the city. The population density was 719.06 inhabitants per square mile (277.6/km^{2}). There were 423 housing units at an average density of 415.52 per square mile (160.4/km^{2}). The racial makeup of the city was 94.26% White, 0.96% African American, 0.96% Native American, 0.00% Asian, 0.55% Pacific Islander, 0.55% from some other races, and 2.73% from two or more races. Hispanic or Latino people of any race were 2.32% of the population.

=== 2010 census ===
As of the 2010 census, there were 807 people, 358 households, and 192 families residing in the city. The population density was 781.98 inhabitants per square mile (301.9/km^{2}). There were 416 housing units at an average density of 403.10 per square mile (155.6/km^{2}). The racial makeup of the city was 97.27% White, 0.00% African American, 0.50% Native American, 0.25% Asian, 0.25% Pacific Islander, 0.25% from some other races, and 1.49% from two or more races. Hispanic or Latino people of any race were 0.37% of the population.

There were 358 households, of which 20.4% had children under the age of 18 living with them, 45.8% were married couples living together, 5.6% had a female householder with no husband present, 2.2% had a male householder with no wife present, and 46.4% were non-families. 40.8% of all households were made up of individuals, and 21.7% had someone living alone who was 65 years of age or older. The average household size was 2.01 and the average family size was 2.74.

The median age in the city was 53.4 years. 17.3% of residents were under the age of 18; 4.1% were between the ages of 18 and 24; 18% were from 25 to 44; 26.3% were from 45 to 64; and 34.2% were 65 years of age or older. The gender makeup of the city was 46.2% male and 53.8% female.

=== 2000 census ===
As of the 2000 census, there were 865 people, 369 households, and 221 families residing in the city. The population density was 831.16 inhabitants per square mile (320.9/km^{2}). There were 405 housing units at an average density of 389.15 per square mile (150.3/km^{2}). The racial makeup of the city was 99.42% White, 0.00% African American, 0.23% Native American, 0.00% Asian, 0.00% Pacific Islander, 0.00% from some other races, and 0.35% from two or more races. Hispanic or Latino people of any race were 0.00% of the population.

There were 369 households, out of which 22.5% had children under the age of 18 living with them, 54.5% were married couples living together, 4.3% had a female householder with no husband present, and 40.1% were non-families. 37.9% of all households were made up of individuals, and 23.6% had someone living alone who was 65 years of age or older. The average household size was 2.08 and the average family size was 2.77.

In the city, the population was spread out, with 17.9% under the age of 18, 4.3% from 18 to 24, 19.2% from 25 to 44, 19.7% from 45 to 64, and 39.0% who were 65 years of age or older. The median age was 52 years. For every 100 females, there were 86.0 males. For every 100 females age 18 and over, there were 85.9 males.

The median income for a household in the city was $27,688, and the median income for a family was $32,368. Males had a median income of $24,444 versus $16,513 for females. The per capita income for the city was $16,258. About 4.4% of families and 8.3% of the population were below the poverty line, including 10.8% of those under age 18 and 12.3% of those age 65 or over.

== Education ==
Glen Ullin is served by the Glen Ullin Public School District 48. It operates the Glen Ullin School. In the 2025-26 academic year, the district reported a total of 140 students.

Glen Ullin currently operates a K-12 school located on the bypass on the south end of Glen Ullin. Glen Ullin's school mascot is the "Bearcat". The school's nickname was previously the "Rattlers", until the school combined with Hebron High School and a name change took place. Glen Ullin's 1st co-op with Hebron, for football, had the team's name of the "Bandits". Glen Ullin is currently combined in football with Beulah.

== Notable people ==
- Ivan Dmitri, (1900—1968), artist and photographer, lived in Glen Ullin from 1914 to 1918
