= Sully Springs, North Dakota =

- Ghost town
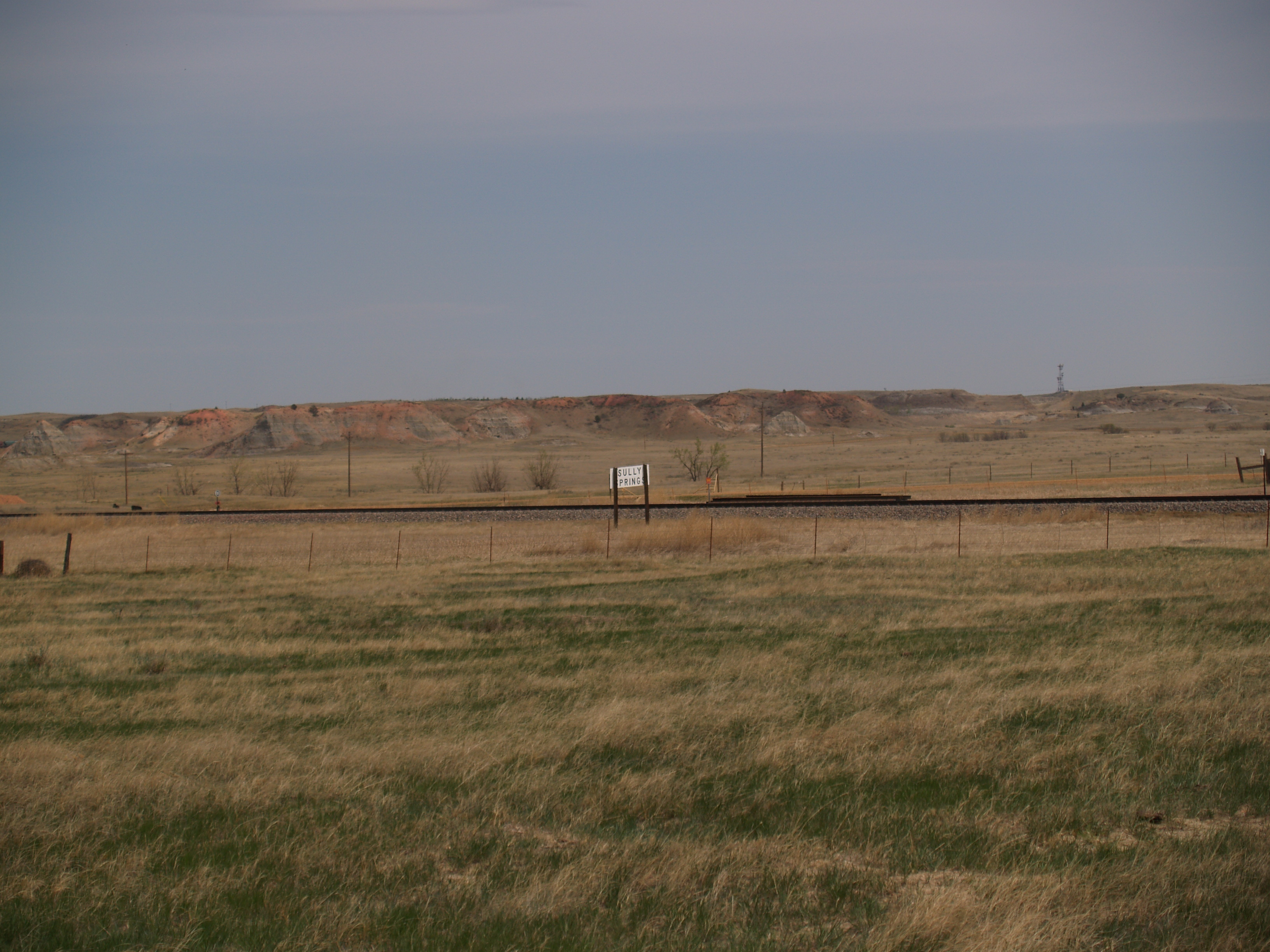
- Sully Springs sign

- Location within the state of North Dakota
- Coordinates: 46°52′02″N 103°23′30″W
- Country: United States
- State: North Dakota
- County: Billings
- Settled: c. 1880
- Abandoned: c. 1939
- Elevation: 2,585 ft (788 m)
- Time zone: UTC-7 (Mountain (MST))
  - Summer (DST): UTC-6 (MDT)
- Area code: 701
- GNIS feature ID: 1033916

Sully Springs is an unincorporated area and ghost town in Billings County, North Dakota, United States. It was established along the Northern Pacific Railroad tracks and named for General Alfred Sully, who had camped in the area.

Around 1880, the railroad established a section house for its workers, which began to grow the town. A general store and three saloons were constructed during this period. Sully Springs gained a post office in 1911 and a school in 1933. However, conditions during the Great Depression and Dust Bowl forced the residents to move, and the town was abandoned by 1939.
