= Morton County, North Dakota =

County in North Dakota, United States

- County
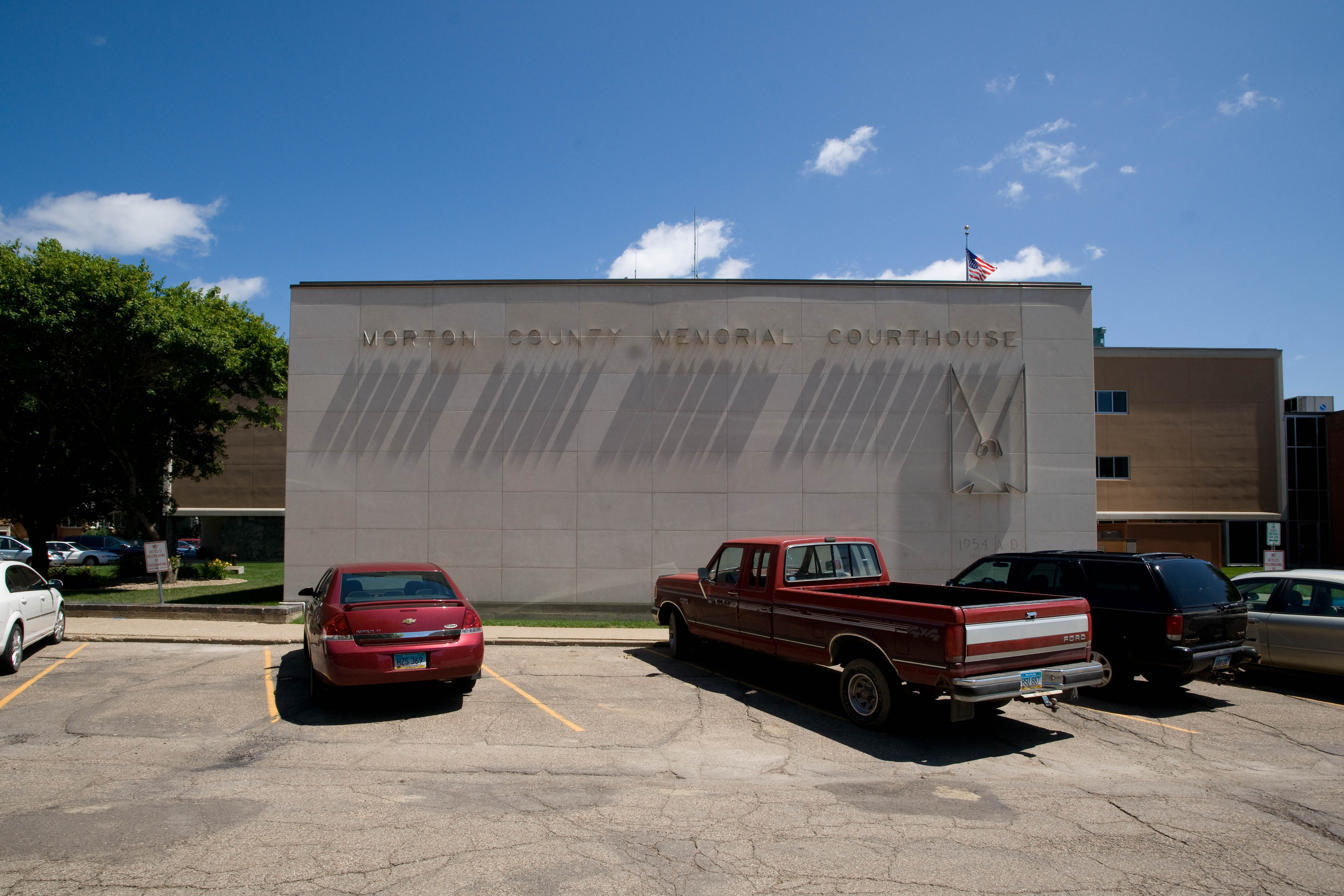
- The Morton County Courthouse in Mandan

- Seal

- Location within the U.S. state of North Dakota
- Coordinates: 46.7100°N 101.3100°W
- Country: United States
- State: North Dakota
- Founded: January 8, 1873 (created); November 5, 1878 (organized)
- Named for: Oliver P. Morton
- Seat: Mandan
- Largest city: Mandan

Area
  - Total: 1,945.167 sq mi (5,037.96 km^{2})
  - Land: 1,925.888 sq mi (4,988.03 km^{2})
  - Water: 19.279 sq mi (49.93 km^{2}) 0.99%

Population (2020)
  - Total: 33,291
  - Estimate (2025): 34,601 ▲
  - Density: 17.286/sq mi (6.6742/km^{2})
- Time zone: UTC−6 (Central)
  - Summer (DST): UTC−5 (CDT)
- Area code: 701
- Congressional district: At-large
- Website: www.mortonnd.gov

Morton County is a county in the U.S. state of North Dakota. As of the 2020 census, the population was 33,291, and was estimated to be 34,601 in 2025, making it the sixth-most populous county in North Dakota. The county seat and the largest city is Mandan, the eighth-largest city in North Dakota.

Morton County is included in the Bismarck metropolitan area.

== Early history ==
The county was created on January 8, 1873, by the Dakota Territory legislature, using territory that had not previously been included in any county. The county organization was not completed at that time, but the new county was not attached to any other county for administrative or judicial matters. Its organization was completed on November 5, 1878. It was named for Oliver Hazard Perry Throck Morton (1823-1877), governor of Indiana during the American Civil War and later a United States Senator. Portions of the county were partitioned off on February 10, 1879, causing the county organization to be not fully organized. This lasted until February 28, 1881, when the organization was again completed. The county's boundaries were adjusted in 1881 and in 1887. In 1916, a portion of Morton County was partitioned off to create Grant County, setting Morton County's boundaries to their present configuration.

After the Northern Pacific Railroad announced the location for the western approach to its Missouri River bridge, a new settlement appeared in December 1878. Initially the US Post Office designated the riverside settlement "Morton" after the corresponding county. The Morton post office later moved to the city center 3 miles west. The county was reorganized in 1881 after the detached land was returned to Morton County by the 1881 legislature. The town, eventually renamed Mandan, was named the county seat.

== Recent history ==
Further information: Curlew Township

=== DAPL protests ===
The 1,172-mile long Dakota Access Pipeline (DAPL) route submitted in its final permit applications starting in September 2014 would include a 72-mile portion through Morton County. The county became a focus of DAPL protests in April 2016. In August 2016 the Standing Rock Sioux Tribe (SRST) filed an injunction against United States Army Corps of Engineers (USACE) to attempt to halt construction. In his 58-page decision by United States District Judge James E. Boasberg shows that the tribe failed to participate in the process of the USACE and Energy Transfer Partners (ETP) to address the tribes complaints. Furthermore, the tribe did not cite a fear of water contamination in the injunction. The injunction request was denied and also failed on appeal. Amnesty International wrote a letter to Sheriff Kyle Kirchmeier on September 28, 2016, requesting that he investigate the use of force by private contractors, remove blockades and discontinue the use of riot gear by Morton County sheriff's deputies when policing protests in order to facilitate the right to peaceful protests in accordance with international law and standards. This letter was written in response to private security guards using guard dogs on advancing protesters on September 3, along with using pepper spray. On Sunday, November 20, 2016, North Dakota police officers fired rubber bullets, tear gas, CS canisters and water from fire hoses at rioting protesters in subfreezing temperatures.

== Geography ==
The Missouri River flows south-southeastward along the east boundary line of Morton County, and Cannonball River flows east-northeastward along the eastern portion of the county's south boundary line. The county terrain consists of low rolling hills, etched by gullies and drainages; the more level areas are devoted to agriculture. The terrain generally slopes to the east and south, but also slopes into the river valleys, with the high point near the midpoint of the north boundary line, at 2,375 ft (724 m) ASL.

According to the United States Census Bureau, the county has a total area of 1,945.167 square miles (5,037.96 km^{2}), of which 1,925.888 square miles (4,988.03 km^{2}) is land and 19.279 square miles (49.93 km^{2}) (0.99%) is water. It is the 7th largest county in North Dakota by total area.

=== Major highways ===
- Interstate 94
- North Dakota Highway 6
- North Dakota Highway 21
- North Dakota Highway 25
- North Dakota Highway 31
- North Dakota Highway 49
- North Dakota Highway 1806

=== Transit ===
- Bis-Man Transit (Capital Area Transit)

=== Adjacent counties ===
- Oliver County - north
- Burleigh County - northeast
- Emmons County - east
- Sioux County - southeast
- Grant County - south
- Stark County - west
- Mercer County - northwest

=== Protected areas ===
- Lake Patricia National Wildlife Refuge
- Morton County State Game Management Area
- Storm Creek State Game Management Area
- Sweet Briar Dam State Game Management Area

=== Lakes ===
- Crown Butte Lake
- Fish Creek Lake
- Harmon Lake
- Lake Oahe (part)
- Lake Patricia
- Storm Creek Lake
- Sweet Briar Lake

== Demographics ==
Historical population
Census	Pop.	Note	%±
1880	200		—
1890	4,728		2,264.0%
1900	8,069		70.7%
1910	25,289		213.4%
1920	18,714		−26.0%
1930	19,647		5.0%
1940	20,184		2.7%
1950	19,295		−4.4%
1960	20,992		8.8%
1970	20,310		−3.2%
1980	25,177		24.0%
1990	23,700		−5.9%
2000	25,303		6.8%
2010	27,471		8.6%
2020	33,291		21.2%
2025 (est.)	34,601		3.9%
U.S. Decennial Census; 1790–1960 1900–1990; 1990–2000 2010–2020

As of the third quarter of 2025, the median home value in Morton County was $272,790.

As of the 2024 American Community Survey, there are 13,946 estimated households in Morton County with an average of 2.37 persons per household. The county has a median household income of $79,382. Approximately 8.0% of the county's population lives at or below the poverty line. Morton County has an estimated 68.3% employment rate, with 28.8% of the population holding a bachelor's degree or higher and 94.8% holding a high school diploma. There were 15,465 housing units at an average density of 8.03 per square mile (3.1/km^{2}).

The top five reported languages (people were allowed to report up to two languages, thus the figures will generally add to more than 100%) were English (94.5%), Spanish (3.4%), Indo-European (1.1%), Asian and Pacific Islander (0.4%), and Other (0.6%).

The median age in the county was 37.6 years.

Morton County, North Dakota – racial and ethnic composition Note: the US Census treats Hispanic/Latino as an ethnic category. This table excludes Latinos from the racial categories and assigns them to a separate category. Hispanics/Latinos may be of any race.
Race / ethnicity (NH = non-Hispanic)	Pop. 1980	Pop. 1990	Pop. 2000	Pop. 2010	Pop. 2020	Pop. 2024
White alone (NH)	24,821 (98.59%)	23,168 (97.76%)	24,161 (95.49%)	25,537 (92.96%)	28,796 (86.50%)	29,501 (86.28%)
Black or African American alone (NH)	7 (0.03%)	12 (0.05%)	38 (0.15%)	112 (0.41%)	462 (1.39%)	561 (1.64%)
Native American or Alaska Native alone (NH)	230 (0.91%)	399 (1.68%)	589 (2.33%)	959 (3.49%)	1,238 (3.72%)	1,417 (4.14%)
Asian alone (NH)	25 (0.10%)	47 (0.20%)	77 (0.30%)	53 (0.19%)	171 (0.51%)	222 (0.65%)
Pacific Islander alone (NH)	—	—	2 (0.01%)	24 (0.09%)	39 (0.12%)	52 (0.15%)
Other race alone (NH)	10 (0.04%)	0 (0.00%)	8 (0.03%)	8 (0.03%)	74 (0.22%)	—
Mixed race or multiracial (NH)	—	—	264 (1.04%)	378 (1.38%)	1,199 (3.60%)	832 (2.43%)
Hispanic or Latino (any race)	84 (0.33%)	74 (0.31%)	164 (0.65%)	400 (1.46%)	1,312 (3.94%)	1,609 (4.71%)
Total	25,177 (100.00%)	23,700 (100.00%)	25,303 (100.00%)	27,471 (100.00%)	33,291 (100.00%)	34,194 (100.00%)

=== 2024 estimate ===
As of the 2024 estimate, there were 34,194 people, 13,946 households, and _ families residing in the county. The population density was 17.75 inhabitants per square mile (6.9/km^{2}). There were 15,465 housing units at an average density of 8.03 per square mile (3.1/km^{2}). The racial makeup of the county was 89.85% White, 1.85% African American, 4.69% Native American, 0.69% Asian, 0.18% Pacific Islander, _% from some other races and 2.74% from two or more races. Hispanic or Latino people of any race were 4.71% of the population.

=== 2020 census ===
As of the 2020 census, there were 33,291 people, 13,827 households, and 8,617 families residing in the county. The population density was 17.29 inhabitants per square mile (6.7/km^{2}). There were 15,107 housing units at an average density of 7.84 per square mile (3.0/km^{2}). The racial makeup of the county was 87.56% White, 1.40% African American, 3.97% Native American, 0.53% Asian, 0.12% Pacific Islander, 1.53% from some other races and 4.89% from two or more races. Hispanic or Latino people of any race were 3.94% of the population.

There were 13,827 households, 28.9% had children under the age of 18 living with them and 23.0% had a female householder with no spouse or partner present; about 30.6% of all households were made up of individuals and 11.0% had someone living alone who was 65 years of age or older.

Of the residents, 23.8% were under the age of 18 and 17.1% were 65 years of age or older; the median age was 38.1 years. For every 100 females there were 101.3 males, and for every 100 females age 18 and over there were 100.8 males. Among occupied housing units, 70.9% were owner-occupied and 29.1% were renter-occupied. The homeowner vacancy rate was 2.4% and the rental vacancy rate was 9.0%.

=== 2010 census ===
As of the 2010 census, there were 27,471 people, 11,289 households, and 7,523 families residing in the county. The population density was 14.26 inhabitants per square mile (5.5/km^{2}). There were 12,079 housing units at an average density of 6.27 per square mile (2.4/km^{2}). The racial makeup of the county was 93.64% White, 0.44% African American, 3.64% Native American, 0.20% Asian, 0.09% Pacific Islander, 0.36% from some other races and 1.63% from two or more races. Hispanic or Latino people of any race were 1.46% of the population.

There were 11,289 households, 30.9% had children under the age of 18 living with them, 53.1% were married couples living together, 9.3% had a female householder with no husband present, 33.4% were non-families, and 27.7% of all households were made up of individuals. The average household size was 2.38 and the average family size was 2.90. The median age was 39.3 years.

The median income for a household in the county was $50,591 and the median income for a family was $62,713. Males had a median income of $42,044 versus $31,505 for females. The per capita income for the county was $25,303. About 5.4% of families and 8.2% of the population were below the poverty line, including 10.8% of those under age 18 and 9.6% of those age 65 or over.

== Communities ==
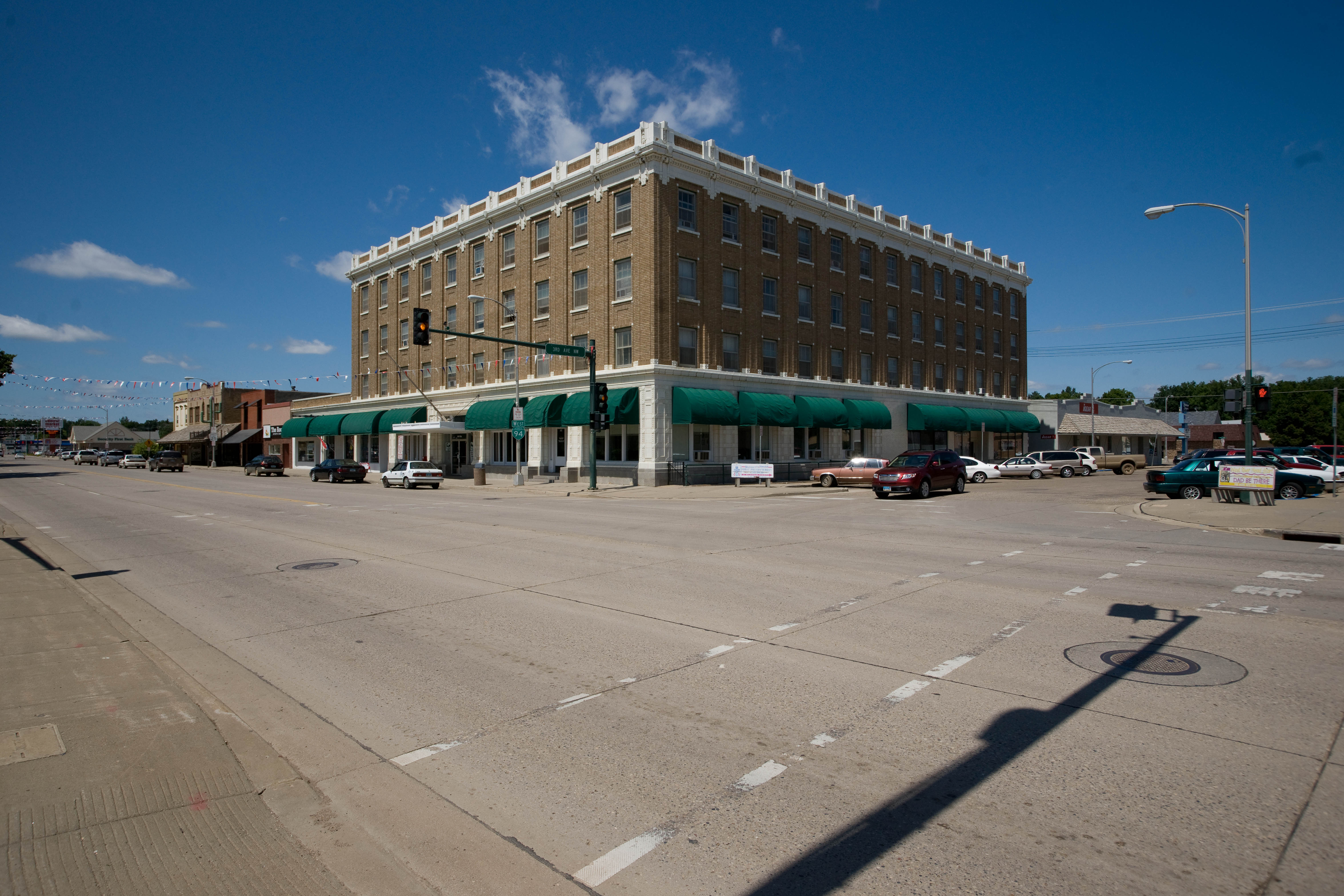
Historic Lewis and Clark Hotel in Mandan

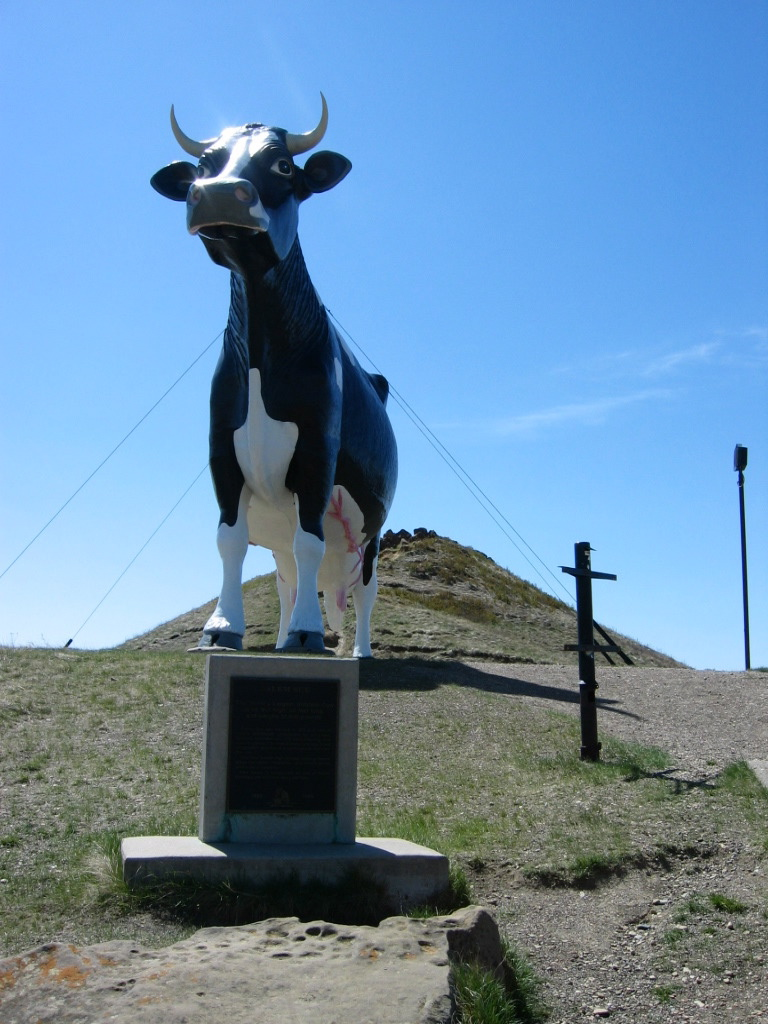
Salem Sue in New Salem

=== Cities ===
- Almont
- Flasher
- Glen Ullin
- Hebron
- Mandan (county seat)
- New Salem

=== Census-designated place ===
- Harmon

=== Unincorporated communities ===
- Bluegrass
- Breien
- Eagle Nest
- Fallon
- Fort Rice
- Huff
- Judson
- Rock Haven
- St. Anthony
- Sims
- Solen
- Sweet Briar
- Timmer
- Youngstown

=== Township ===
- Captain's Landing

== Politics ==
Morton County voters have been reliably Republican for decades. In only one national election since 1964 has the county selected the Democratic Party candidate.

United States presidential election results for Morton County, North Dakota
Year	Republican		Democratic		Third party(ies)	
Year	No.	%	No.	%	No.	%
1900	1,056	66.04%	536	33.52%	7	0.44%
1904	1,474	80.77%	321	17.59%	30	1.64%
1908	2,021	67.91%	873	29.33%	82	2.76%
1912	1,011	27.94%	1,017	28.11%	1,590	43.95%
1916	2,785	56.35%	1,835	37.13%	322	6.52%
1920	4,618	86.37%	632	11.82%	97	1.81%
1924	2,377	44.26%	265	4.93%	2,728	50.80%
1928	2,881	42.04%	3,946	57.58%	26	0.38%
1932	1,828	24.60%	5,548	74.67%	54	0.73%
1936	1,857	22.95%	5,612	69.37%	621	7.68%
1940	5,499	65.25%	2,889	34.28%	40	0.47%
1944	3,537	65.32%	1,850	34.16%	28	0.52%
1948	3,607	56.41%	2,521	39.43%	266	4.16%
1952	6,309	74.88%	2,079	24.67%	38	0.45%
1956	5,232	66.31%	2,628	33.31%	30	0.38%
1960	4,028	45.28%	4,866	54.70%	1	0.01%
1964	2,955	36.31%	5,173	63.57%	10	0.12%
1968	4,465	55.02%	3,156	38.89%	494	6.09%
1972	5,494	59.87%	3,312	36.09%	371	4.04%
1976	4,921	47.04%	5,241	50.10%	300	2.87%
1980	7,659	66.84%	2,861	24.97%	938	8.19%
1984	7,146	62.93%	3,996	35.19%	214	1.88%
1988	5,588	53.49%	4,708	45.07%	151	1.45%
1992	5,042	43.76%	3,594	31.19%	2,886	25.05%
1996	4,699	46.66%	3,745	37.19%	1,626	16.15%
2000	6,993	62.31%	3,439	30.64%	791	7.05%
2004	8,325	65.90%	4,073	32.24%	235	1.86%
2008	7,869	58.99%	5,079	38.08%	391	2.93%
2012	8,680	63.76%	4,469	32.83%	464	3.41%
2016	11,336	71.60%	3,080	19.45%	1,416	8.94%
2020	12,243	73.67%	3,872	23.30%	504	3.03%
2024	12,839	75.36%	3,748	22.00%	449	2.64%

== Education ==
School districts include:

- Flasher Public School, District 39, Flasher
- Glen Ullin Public School, District 48, Glen Ullin
- Hebron Public School, District 13, Hebron
- Little Heart Public School, District 4, St. Anthony
- Mandan Public Schools, District 1, Mandan
- New Salem-Almont School, District 49, New Salem
- Solen Public School, District 3, Solen
- Sweet Briar Public School, District 17, Mandan

== See also ==
- National Register of Historic Places listings in Morton County, North Dakota
