= Stanley, North Dakota =

- City
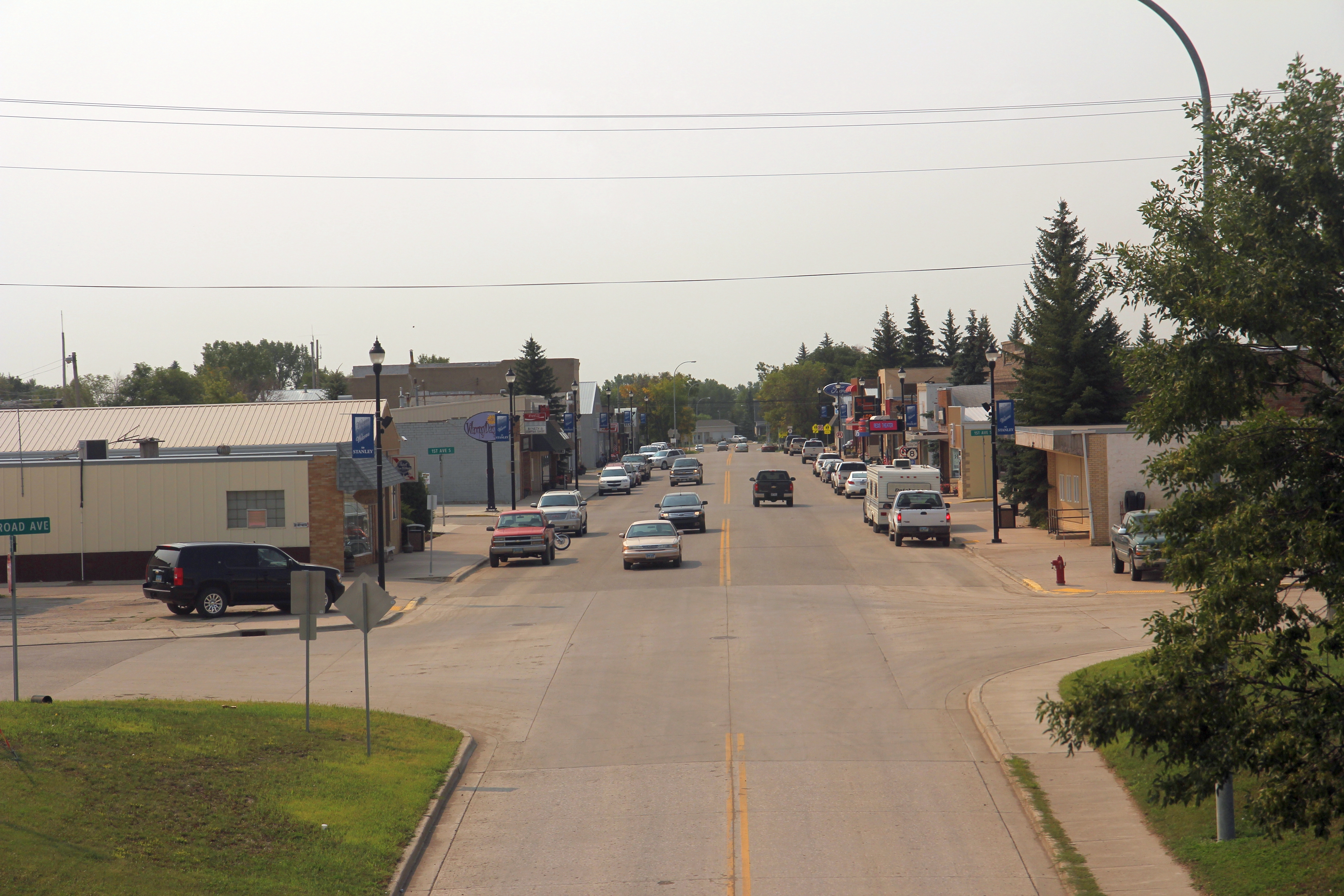
- Downtown Stanley on ND 8
- Nickname: "Blue Jays"
- Location of Stanley, North Dakota

- Location in the United States
- Coordinates: 48°18′49″N 102°23′50″W
- Country: United States
- State: North Dakota
- County: Mountrail
- Founded: 1902

Government
  - Mayor: Marlin Ranum

Area
  - Total: 4.71 sq mi (12.19 km^{2})
  - Land: 4.51 sq mi (11.67 km^{2})
  - Water: 0.20 sq mi (0.51 km^{2})
- Elevation: 2,244 ft (684 m)

Population (2020)
  - Total: 2,321
  - Estimate (2024): 2,214
  - Density: 515.0/sq mi (198.84/km^{2})
- Time zone: UTC-6 (Central (CST))
  - Summer (DST): UTC-5 (CDT)
- ZIP code: 58784
- Area code: 701
- FIPS code: 38-75380
- GNIS feature ID: 1036284
- Highways: US 2, ND 8
- Website: stanleynd.com

Stanley is the only major city in Mountrail County, North Dakota, United States. It is the county seat of Mountrail County. The population was 2,321 at the 2020 census, making it the 22nd most populous city in North Dakota. Stanley was founded in 1902. The town's economy is heavily connected to the nearby oil-rich Bakken Formation.

== History ==
Stanley was platted in 1902. The Mountrail County Courthouse was built in 1914.

In 1935, Stanley was the site of one of the deadliest tornadoes in North Dakota's recorded history. The storm claimed four lives and injured more.

== Geography ==
According to the United States Census Bureau, the city has a total area of 1.83 square miles (4.74 km^{2}), of which 1.82 square miles (4.71 km^{2}) is land and 0.01 square miles (0.03 km^{2}) is water.

== Transportation ==
=== Rail ===
Amtrak, the national passenger rail system, serves a station in Stanley via its Empire Builder, a once-daily train in each direction between Portland, Oregon/Seattle, Washington and Chicago. The Great Northern Railway Underpass is now on the National Register of Historic Places.

== Economy ==
=== Oil ===
Stanley is situated on the Bakken Formation, which encompasses northwestern North Dakota, northeastern Montana, and southern Saskatchewan, Canada. The formation is a rich source of oil, first discovered in the 1950s. Until the late 2000s the cost of oil extraction was too high to retrieve the oil profitably. With new technologies in oilfield production and the rising price of oil, the field has now become economically viable. The field may be the largest producing onshore field in the Continental United States outside of Texas and California, with the U.S. Geological Survey estimating that it contains between 3 billion and 4,300,000,000 barrels (680,000,000 m^{3}) of oil, sixth overall in the lower 48, and could hold as much as 200 billion barrels (32×10^{9} m^{3}) of oil.

== Demographics ==
Historical population
Census	Pop.	Note	%±
1910	518		—
1920	591		14.1%
1930	936		58.4%
1940	1,058		13.0%
1950	1,486		40.5%
1960	1,795		20.8%
1970	1,581		−11.9%
1980	1,631		3.2%
1990	1,371		−15.9%
2000	1,279		−6.7%
2010	1,458		14.0%
2020	2,321		59.2%
2024 (est.)	2,214		−4.6%
U.S. Decennial Census; 2020 Census

=== 2020 census ===
As of the 2020 census, Stanley had a population of 2,321. The median age was 35.0 years. 27.7% of residents were under the age of 18 and 13.7% of residents were 65 years of age or older. For every 100 females there were 111.8 males, and for every 100 females age 18 and over there were 113.5 males age 18 and over.

0.0% of residents lived in urban areas, while 100.0% lived in rural areas.

There were 907 households in Stanley, of which 31.6% had children under the age of 18 living in them. Of all households, 45.9% were married-couple households, 26.2% were households with a male householder and no spouse or partner present, and 20.1% were households with a female householder and no spouse or partner present. About 33.2% of all households were made up of individuals and 9.4% had someone living alone who was 65 years of age or older.

There were 1,199 housing units, of which 24.4% were vacant. The homeowner vacancy rate was 3.8% and the rental vacancy rate was 30.8%.

Racial composition as of the 2020 census
Race	Number	Percent
White	1,934	83.3%
Black or African American	18	0.8%
American Indian and Alaska Native	43	1.9%
Asian	20	0.9%
Native Hawaiian and Other Pacific Islander	1	0.0%
Some other race	87	3.7%
Two or more races	218	9.4%
Hispanic or Latino (of any race)	295	12.7%

=== 2010 census ===
As of the census of 2010, there were 1,458 people, 629 households, and 362 families living in the city. The population density was 801.1 inhabitants per square mile (309.3/km^{2}). There were 718 housing units at an average density of 394.5 per square mile (152.3/km^{2}). The racial makeup of the city was 97.4% White, 0.2% African American, 0.5% Native American, 0.5% Asian, 0.6% from other races, and 0.8% from two or more races. Hispanic or Latino of any race were 3.9% of the population.

There were 629 households, of which 24.0% had children under the age of 18 living with them, 47.5% were married couples living together, 5.7% had a female householder with no husband present, 4.3% had a male householder with no wife present, and 42.4% were non-families. 35.8% of all households were made up of individuals, and 16.5% had someone living alone who was 65 years of age or older. The average household size was 2.21 and the average family size was 2.89.

The median age in the city was 44.1 years. 21% of residents were under the age of 18; 6.5% were between the ages of 18 and 24; 23.2% were from 25 to 44; 26.5% were from 45 to 64; and 22.9% were 65 years of age or older. The gender makeup of the city was 50.2% male and 49.8% female.

=== 2000 census ===
As of the census of 2000, there were 1,279 people, 576 households, and 332 families living in the city. The population density was 740.3 inhabitants per square mile (285.8/km^{2}). There were 664 housing units at an average density of 384.3 per square mile (148.4/km^{2}). The racial makeup of the city was 98.98% White, 0.55% Native American, 0.31% Asian, 0.08% Pacific Islander, and 0.08% from two or more races. Hispanic or Latino of any race were 0.55% of the population.

There were 576 households, out of which 24.0% had children under the age of 18 living with them, 48.1% were married couples living together, 6.8% had a female householder with no husband present, and 42.2% were non-families. 39.8% of all households were made up of individuals, and 24.0% had someone living alone who was 65 years of age or older. The average household size was 2.12 and the average family size was 2.84.

In the city, the population was spread out, with 22.3% under the age of 18, 5.9% from 18 to 24, 18.8% from 25 to 44, 22.8% from 45 to 64, and 30.3% who were 65 years of age or older. The median age was 47 years. For every 100 females, there were 86.2 males. For every 100 females age 18 and over, there were 82.7 males.

The median income for a household in the city was $23,993, and the median income for a family was $35,074. Males had a median income of $26,250 versus $17,813 for females. The per capita income for the city was $15,349. About 5.7% of families and 10.7% of the population were below the poverty line, including 12.6% of those under age 18 and 14.3% of those age 65 or over.

== Notable people ==
- Ann Nicole Nelson, a victim of the September 11, 2001 attacks
- Lee Harvey Oswald allegedly lived in Stanley for a short time in 1953, though this claim has been thoroughly debunked

== Education ==
The school district is Stanley Public School District 2.

== Climate ==
This climatic region is typified by large seasonal temperature differences, with warm to hot (and often humid) summers and cold (sometimes severely cold) winters. According to the Köppen Climate Classification system, Stanley has a humid continental climate, abbreviated "Dfb" on climate maps.

Climate data for Stanley 3 NNW, North Dakota, 1991–2020 normals, 1938-2020 extremes: 2280ft (695m)
Month	Jan	Feb	Mar	Apr	May	Jun	Jul	Aug	Sep	Oct	Nov	Dec	Year
Record high °F (°C)	56 (13)	60 (16)	76 (24)	90 (32)	95 (35)	102 (39)	105 (41)	110 (43)	100 (38)	92 (33)	74 (23)	64 (18)	110 (43)
Mean maximum °F (°C)	41.0 (5.0)	42.7 (5.9)	58.7 (14.8)	76.3 (24.6)	84.9 (29.4)	89.0 (31.7)	92.8 (33.8)	95.7 (35.4)	91.3 (32.9)	78.1 (25.6)	56.8 (13.8)	42.2 (5.7)	95.0 (35.0)
Mean daily maximum °F (°C)	17.3 (−8.2)	21.5 (−5.8)	34.2 (1.2)	51.4 (10.8)	64.4 (18.0)	73.1 (22.8)	79.7 (26.5)	80.3 (26.8)	69.6 (20.9)	52.8 (11.6)	34.8 (1.6)	22.2 (−5.4)	50.1 (10.1)
Daily mean °F (°C)	8.4 (−13.1)	12.0 (−11.1)	24.1 (−4.4)	38.9 (3.8)	51.2 (10.7)	61.0 (16.1)	66.8 (19.3)	66.0 (18.9)	55.9 (13.3)	41.1 (5.1)	25.6 (−3.6)	13.7 (−10.2)	38.7 (3.7)
Mean daily minimum °F (°C)	−0.6 (−18.1)	2.5 (−16.4)	14.0 (−10.0)	26.4 (−3.1)	38.1 (3.4)	49.0 (9.4)	53.9 (12.2)	51.7 (10.9)	42.1 (5.6)	29.4 (−1.4)	16.3 (−8.7)	5.2 (−14.9)	27.3 (−2.6)
Mean minimum °F (°C)	−25.0 (−31.7)	−19.6 (−28.7)	−9.9 (−23.3)	11.7 (−11.3)	25.3 (−3.7)	39.3 (4.1)	44.8 (7.1)	42.2 (5.7)	28.2 (−2.1)	14.3 (−9.8)	−3.7 (−19.8)	−18.8 (−28.2)	−27.9 (−33.3)
Record low °F (°C)	−41 (−41)	−42 (−41)	−32 (−36)	−15 (−26)	12 (−11)	30 (−1)	34 (1)	30 (−1)	10 (−12)	−3 (−19)	−30 (−34)	−47 (−44)	−47 (−44)
Average precipitation inches (mm)	0.54 (14)	0.55 (14)	0.79 (20)	1.33 (34)	2.49 (63)	3.86 (98)	3.09 (78)	2.14 (54)	1.82 (46)	1.31 (33)	0.73 (19)	0.63 (16)	19.28 (489)
Average snowfall inches (cm)	7.60 (19.3)	7.10 (18.0)	7.50 (19.1)	4.60 (11.7)	1.30 (3.3)	0.00 (0.00)	0.00 (0.00)	0.00 (0.00)	0.20 (0.51)	3.80 (9.7)	5.10 (13.0)	10.20 (25.9)	47.4 (120.51)
Source 1: NOAA
Source 2: XMACIS (temp records & monthly max/mins)
