= Stanley station (North Dakota) =

Stanley, ND
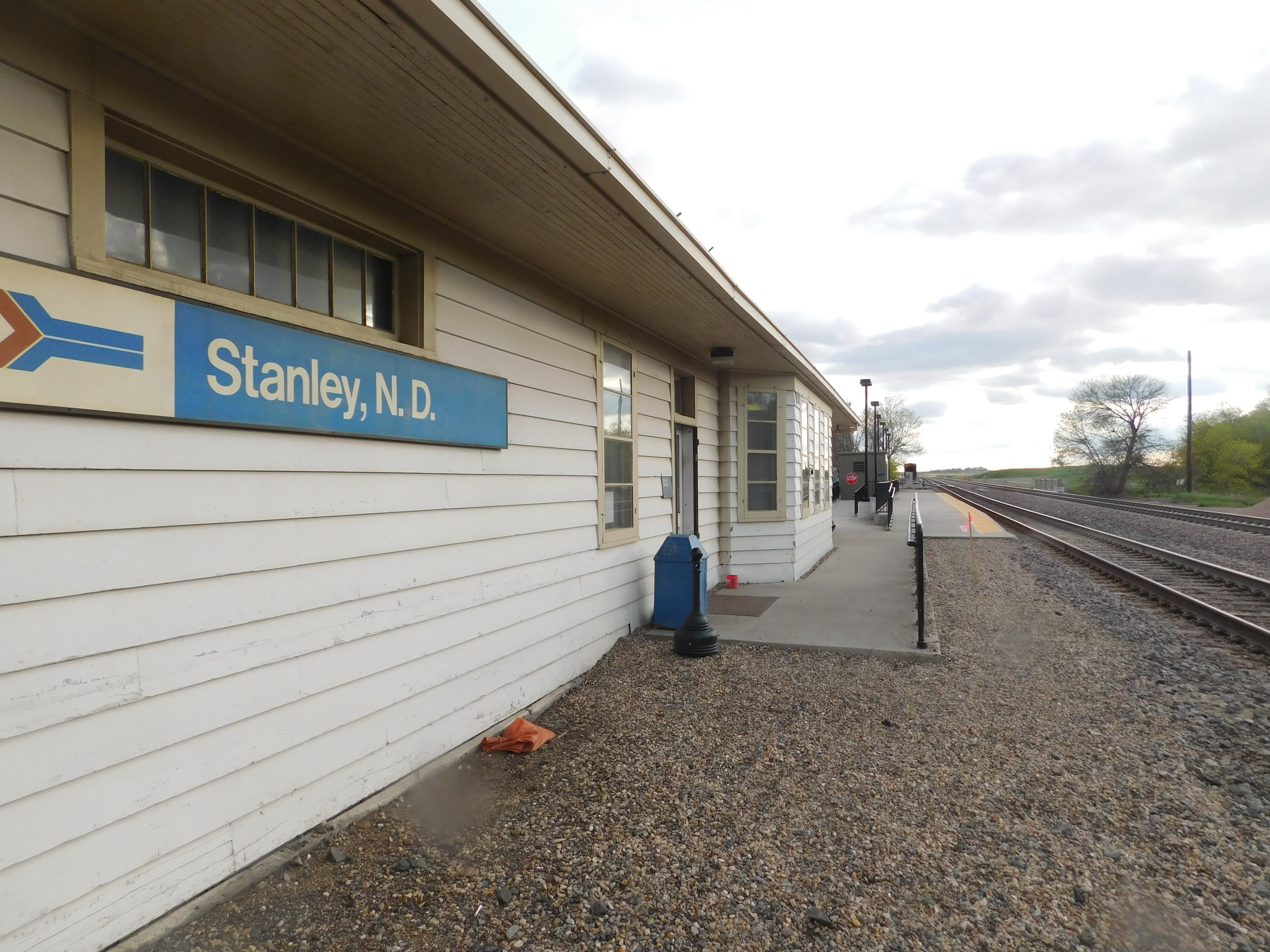
- Stanley station, May 2017

General information
- Location: Main Street & Railroad Avenue; Stanley, North Dakota; United States
- Coordinates: 48.3199°N 102.3895°W
- Owner: BNSF Railway
- Line: BNSF Glasgow Subdivision
- Platforms: 1 side platform
- Tracks: 2

Construction
- Parking: Yes
- Accessible: Yes

Other information
- Station code: Amtrak: STN

Passengers
- FY 2025: 2,660 (Amtrak)

Services
Preceding station	Amtrak	Following station
Williston toward Seattle or Portland	Empire Builder	Minot toward Chicago
Former services
Preceding station	Great Northern Railway	Following station
Ross toward Seattle	Main Line	Palermo toward St. Paul
Wassaic toward Grenora	Grenora – Stanley	Terminus
Location

Stanley station is a train station in Stanley, North Dakota served by Amtrak's Empire Builder line. The platform, tracks, and wooden depot are owned by BNSF Railway. It was originally a Great Northern Railway station that was a replacement for an earlier one, which is now a private residence.

In 2025, Amtrak completed a $400,000 renovation of the station to improve accessibility.
