= Fairfield, North Dakota =

Fairfield
- Unincorporated community
- Location within the state of North Dakota Fairfield (the United States)
- Coordinates: 47°11′22″N 103°13′20″W
- Country: United States
- State: North Dakota
- County: Billings
- Elevation: 2,756 ft (840 m)

Population (2000)
  - Total: 126
- Time zone: UTC-6 ([[Mountain Time Zone (Americas)|Central (CST)]])
  - Summer (DST): UTC-5 (CDT)
- ZIP codes: 58627
- Area code: 701
- GNIS feature ID: 1034862

Fairfield is an unincorporated community in northeastern Billings County, North Dakota, United States. It lies along U.S. Route 85, northeast of the city of Medora, the county seat of Billings County. It has a post office serving the ZIP code of 58627.

Fairfield is part of the Dickinson Micropolitan Statistical Area.

== History ==
The population was 15 in 1940.

== Climate ==
This climatic region is typified by large seasonal temperature differences, with warm to hot (and often humid) summers and cold (sometimes severely cold) winters. According to the Köppen Climate Classification system, Fairfield has a humid continental climate, abbreviated "Dfb" on climate maps.
