= Hettinger =

Hettinger may refer to:

- Hettinger, North Dakota
- Hettinger County, North Dakota
- Hettinger Township, Adams County, North Dakota
- A resident of Hettingen, Germany
- Hettinger (surname)
