= U.S. Route 12 in North Dakota =

Section of U.S. Highway in North Dakota

U.S. Highway 12
- US 12 highlighted in red

Route information
- Maintained by NDDOT
- Length: 87.470 mi (140.769 km)
- Existed: 1926–present

Major junctions
- West end: US 12 at the Montana state line near Marmarth
- US 85 in Bowman; ND 67 in Scranton; ND 8 in Hettinger
- East end: US 12 at the South Dakota state line near Haynes

Location
- Country: United States
- State: North Dakota
- Counties: Slope, Bowman, Adams

Highway system
- United States Numbered Highway System; List; Special; Divided; North Dakota State Highway System; Interstate; US; State
| ← ND 11 | → ND 13 |

U.S. Route 12 (US 12) is a part of the United States Numbered Highway System that travels from Aberdeen, Washington, to Detroit, Michigan. In the state of North Dakota, US 12 extends from the Montana border east to the South Dakota border.

== Route description ==
Throughout the state, US 12 is a two-lane undivided highway that runs through Adams, Bowman, and Slope counties in southwest North Dakota. The speed limit is 65 mph (105 km/h) on rural segments, with slower posted speeds within the cities of Marmarth, Rhame, Bowman, Scranton, and Hettinger. US 12 meets with US 85 in Bowman, and the routes run concurrently for a short distance through the city.

== Major intersections ==
| County | Location | mi | km | Destinations | Notes |
|---|---|---|---|---|---|
| Slope | Bucklin Township | 0.000 | 0.000 | US 12 west – Baker, Miles City | Continuation into Montana |
| Bowman | Bowman | 33.207 | 53.441 | US 85 south – Belle Fourche | Western end of US 85 concurrency |
| Bowman | Bowman | 33.867 | 54.504 | US 85 north – Belfield | Eastern end of US 85 concurrency |
| Bowman | Scranton | 46.415 | 74.698 | ND 67 north – Scranton | Southern terminus of ND 67 |
| Adams | Reeder Township | 56.112 | 90.304 | ND 22 south – State Line | Western end of ND 22 concurrency |
| Adams | Reeder–Bucyrus township line | 60.369 | 97.154 | ND 22 north – New England, Dickinson | Eastern end of ND 22 concurrency |
| Adams | Hettinger Township | 73.455 | 118.214 | ND 8 south – Lodgepole | Western end of ND 8 concurrency |
| Adams | Clermont Township | 81.540 | 131.226 | ND 8 north / Haynes Road south – Mott, Haynes | Eastern end of ND 8 concurrency |
| Adams | Clermont Township | 87.470 | 140.769 | US 12 east – Lemmon | Continuation into South Dakota |
1.000 mi = 1.609 km; 1.000 km = 0.621 mi: Concurrency terminus

== See also ==
U.S. Route 12
| Previous state: Montana | North Dakota | Next state: South Dakota |
