= Petrel, North Dakota =

- Ghost town
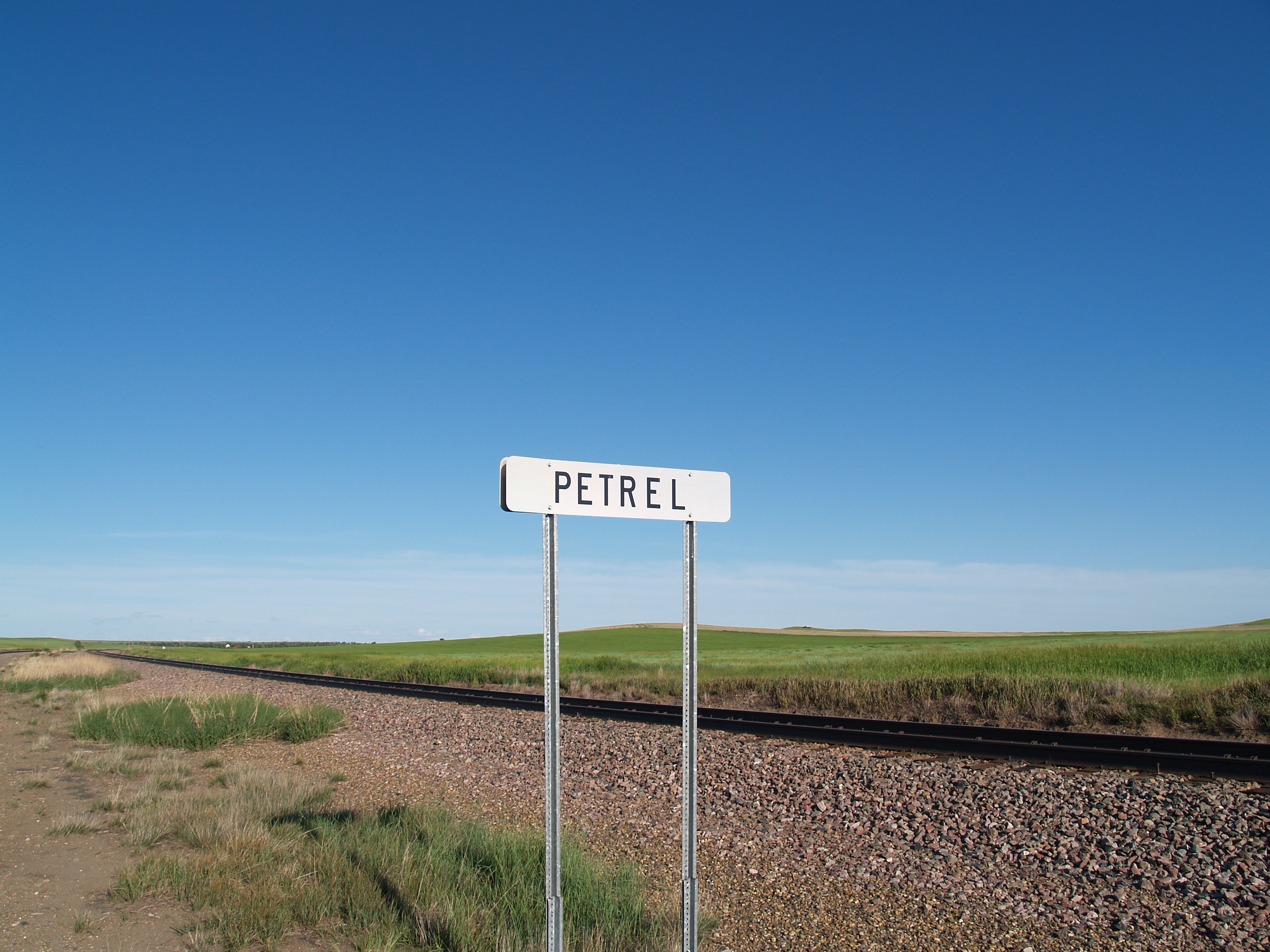
- Sign along the railroad tracks in Petrel, North Dakota

- Location in North Dakota Location in the United States
- Coordinates: 45°56′54″N 102°16′38″W
- Country: United States
- State: North Dakota
- County: Adams
- Township: Gilstrap
- First Settled: 1908
- Elevation: 2,566 ft (782 m)

Population (2000)
  - Total: 28
- Time zone: UTC-7 (Mountain (MST))
  - Summer (DST): UTC-6 (MDT)
- ZIP Code: 57638
- Area code: 701
- FIPS code: 38-62020
- GNIS feature ID: 1033784

Petrel is a ghost town in Adams County, North Dakota, United States. It is located just across the border with South Dakota, between Lemmon, South Dakota, in Perkins County and Haynes. Petrel is a former railroad townsite and siding on the Milwaukee Road. The town was named for the long-winged pigeons seen in the area.

== History ==
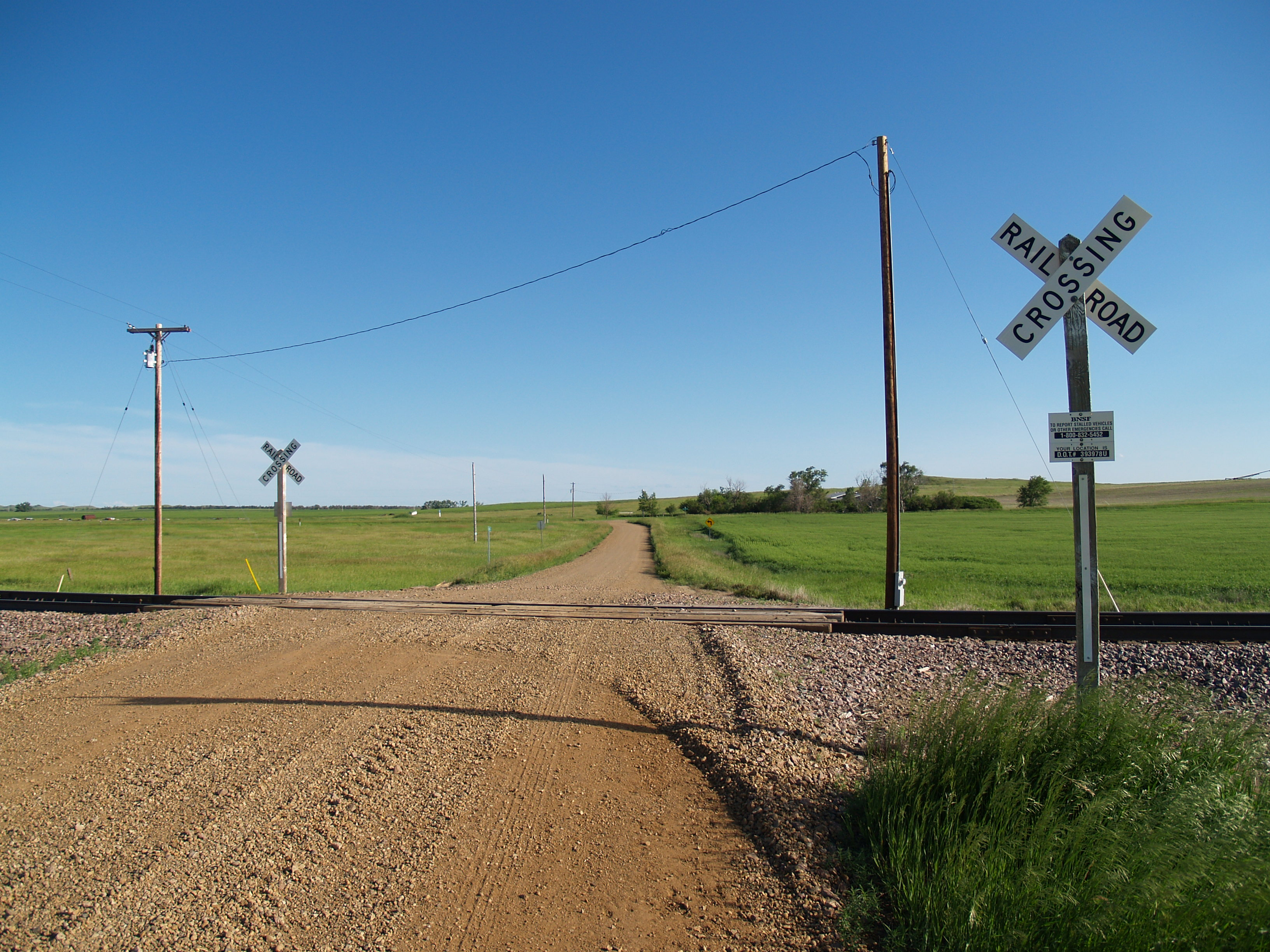
The only railroad crossing in town is a reminder that the tracks are still in use today, even if the town is not.

Petrel was established as a townsite along the Chicago, Milwaukee, St. Paul and Pacific Railroad in Gilstrap Township. A post office was established in the town on October 29, 1908, when the post office for the neighboring area of Thebes was moved to the new townsite and assumed the new name. The Petrel post office closed September 30, 1939, and mail service was transferred to Lemmon, South Dakota. As a result, the town and the surrounding area share the Lemmon ZIP Code of 57638, even though they are in North Dakota. Little remains of the physical town today, other than a few deteriorating building foundations and other equipment.

BNSF Railway operates the railroad today. Petrel is located at mile marker 909.7.

The city of Rhame in neighboring Bowman County was originally named Petrel when it was founded in 1908, but the name was soon changed to avoid confusion.

== Geography ==
Petrel is located roughly 1 mile (1.6 km) north of the North Dakota-South Dakota border. It is 6 miles (9.7 km) from Lemmon and 21 miles (34 km) from Hettinger, the county seat of Adams County, North Dakota.

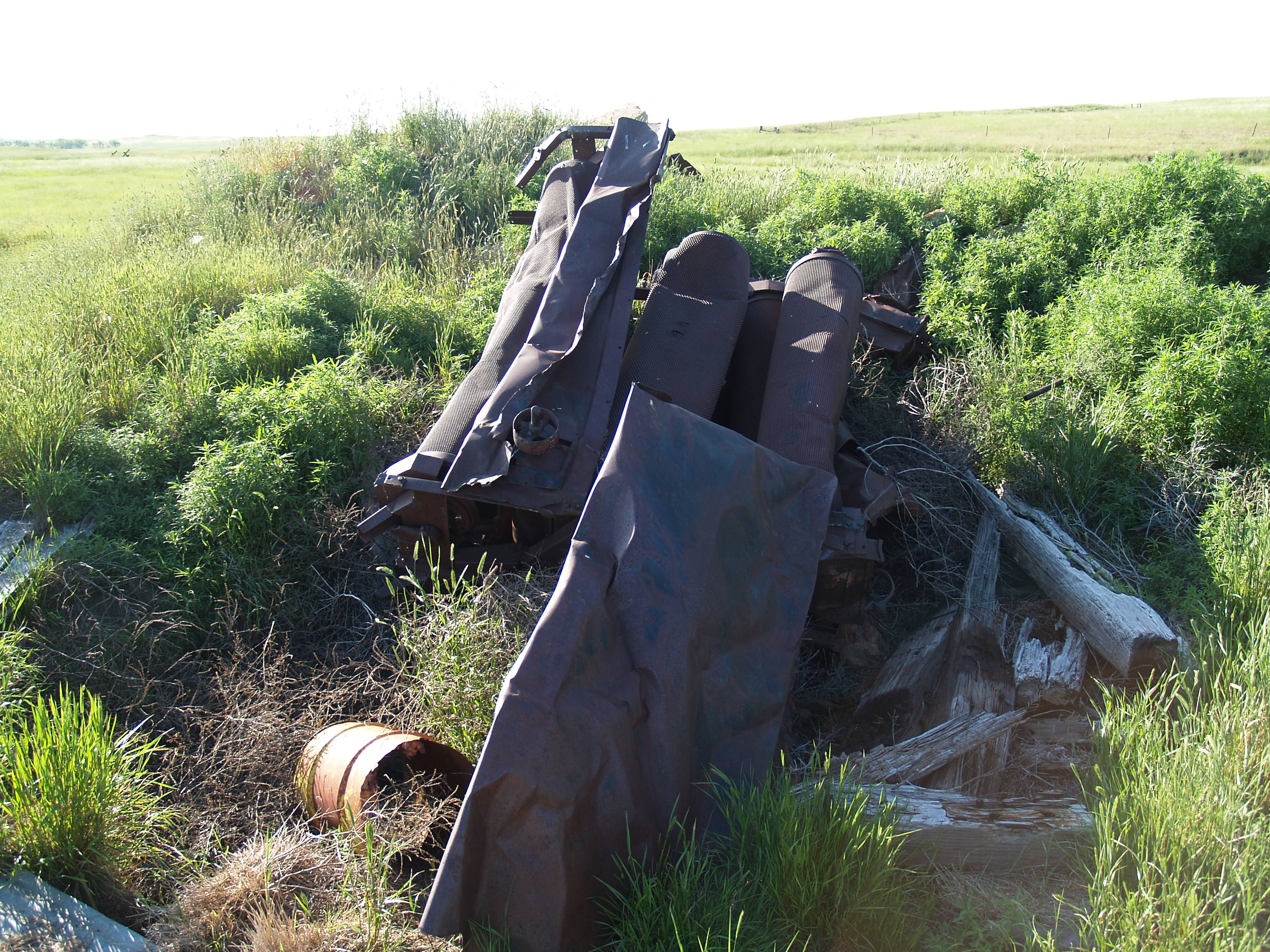
Abandoned equipment lies rusting in much of the townsite.

== Demographics ==
Petrel had approximately 100 people living there in the mid to late 1910s. A population of roughly 65 people was recorded in 1960. Today, it is a ghost town, with much of the population spread throughout the countryside. Today, the United States Census Bureau does not track specific population numbers for the community, but the surrounding township had a population of 28 as of the 2000 Census.

== Notable people ==
- Henry J. Stinger, Republican member of the North Dakota House of Representatives (1913–1918)
- Martin Hersrud, Republican member of the North Dakota House of Representatives (1911–1912)
