= Maine Township, Illinois =

Maine Township, Illinois may refer to one of the following townships:

- Maine Township, Cook County, Illinois
- Maine Township, Grundy County, Illinois

See also

- Maine Township (disambiguation)
