= North Dakota Highway 8 =

State highway in North Dakota, US

North Dakota Highway 8
- ND 8 highlighted in red

Route information
- Maintained by NDDOT
- Length: 211.321 mi (340.088 km)
- Tourist routes: Lewis and Clark Trail

Southern segment
- Length: 133 mi (214 km)
- South end: SD 75 south of Hettinger
- Major intersections: US 12 in Hettinger; ND 21 in Mott; I-94 in Richardton; ND 200 near Halliday
- North end: Lake Sakakawea

Northern segment
- Length: 78 mi (126 km)
- South end: ND 23 / ND 1804 near Van Hook
- Major intersections: US 2 in Stanley; ND 50 near Powers Lake; US 52 / ND 5 in Bowbells
- North end: Highway 9 at the Canadian border in Northgate

Location
- Country: United States
- State: North Dakota
- Counties: Adams; Hettinger; Stark; Dunn; Mountrail; Burke

Highway system
- North Dakota State Highway System; Interstate; US; State
← ND 7	→ ND 9

North Dakota Highway 8 (ND 8) is a 211.321-mile (340.088 km) north–south state highway in North Dakota, United States. The highway is split into two segments. The southern segment is 133 miles (214 km) long and travels from Lake Sakakawea near Twin Buttes to South Dakota Highway 75 (SD 75) near Hettinger. The northern segment is 78 miles (126 km) long and travels from Saskatchewan Highway 9 (SK 9) in Northgate on the Canada–United States border to ND 23 near New Town. The highway was originally continuous but was separated by the formation of Lake Sakakawea in the 1950s.

== Route description ==
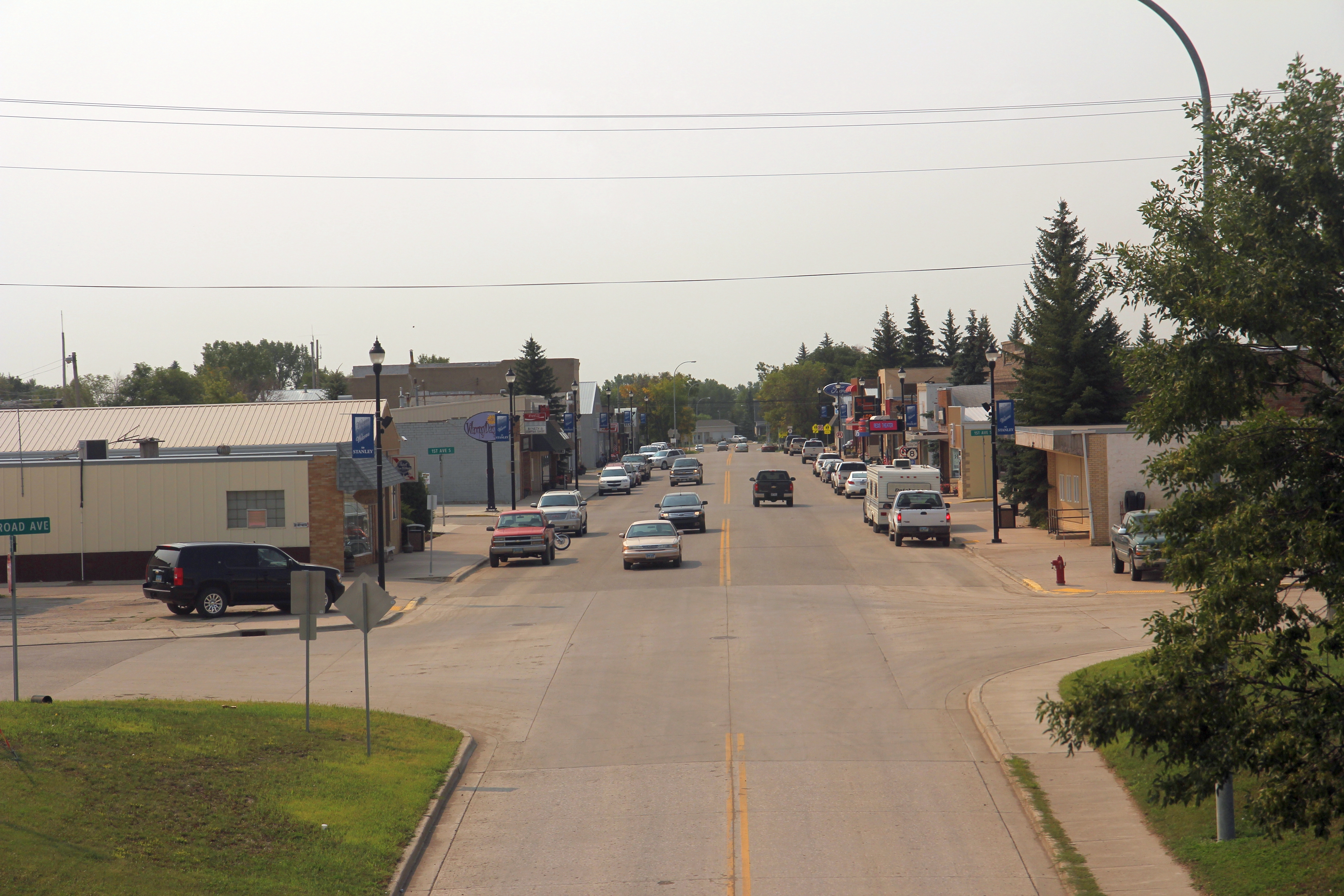
ND 8 in Stanley, August 2013

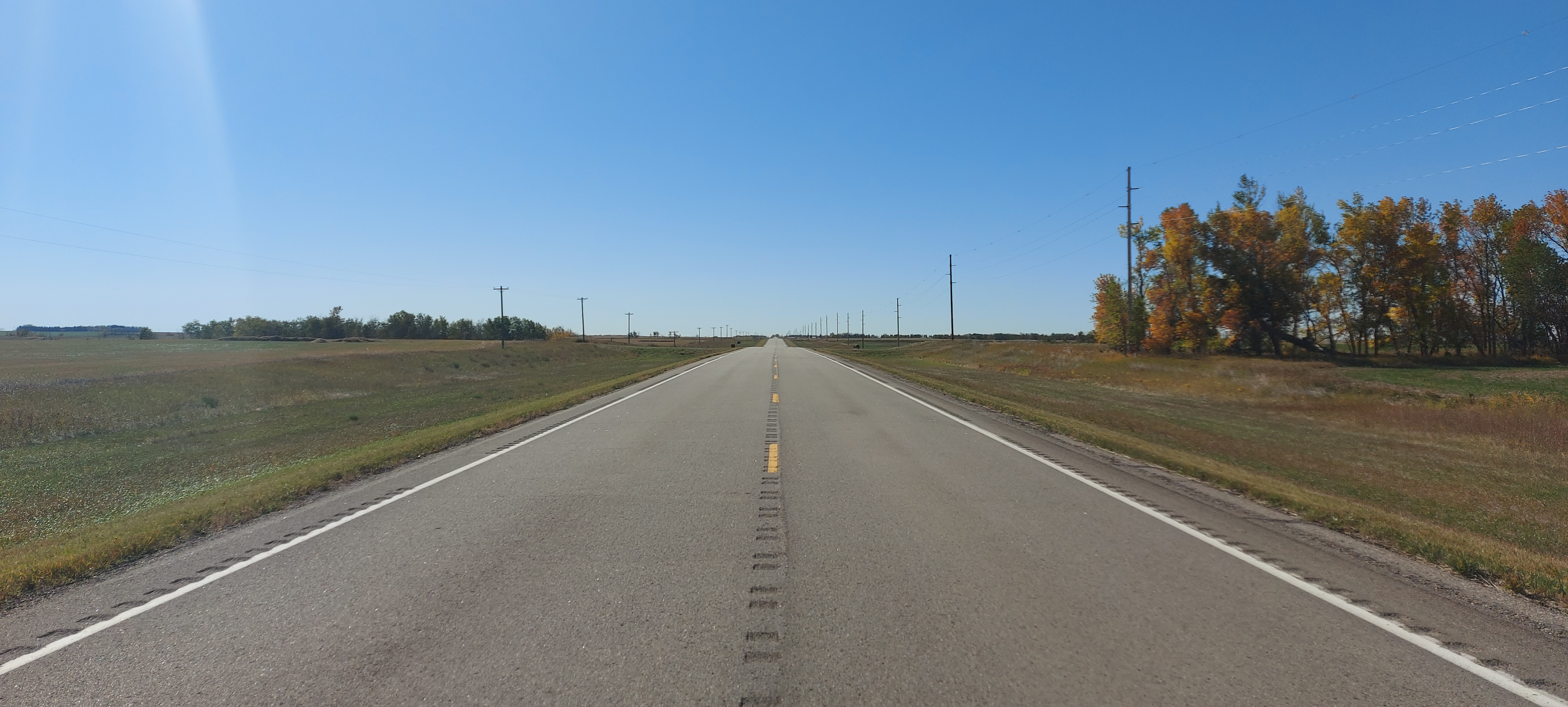
ND 8 near Northgate

ND 8 enters North Dakota at SD 75’s northern terminus, four miles (6.4 km) south of Hettinger, where it turns east onto US 12 and runs concurrently for 8.1 miles (13.0 km). For the next 25.2 miles (40.6 km), ND 8 heads north alone after leaving US 12 and turns east onto ND 21, running concurrently with the latter highway for 7.7 miles (12.4 km). ND 21 turns off at Mott, while ND 8 continues north for 34.7 miles (55.8 km) until crossing over I-94 near Richardton. Skirting through the southern edge of Richardton, ND 8 turns to the north again at County Highway 10 and then runs for 29.6 miles (47.6 km), passing the small town of Marshall, before joining ND 200 for 1.9 miles (3.1 km). At Halliday, ND 8 turns off ND 200 and once again heads north, meeting the end of ND 1806 halfway in the 13.6-mile (21.9 km) trek between Halliday and Twin Buttes. The two segments used to connect before the formation of Lake Sakakawea, with a former bridge over the Missouri River near the former town of Elbowoods, which was flooded by the lake.

North of Lake Sakakawea, ND 8 resumes again at a roundabout with ND 1804 and heads 23.5 miles (37.8 km) north to US 2 and Stanley. The 40.9-mile (65.8 km) course between Stanley and US 52 in Bowbells involves a brief concurrency with ND 50 and a section in the Lostwood National Wildlife Refuge. At US 52, ND 8 turns to the north for 6.8 miles (10.9 km) before leaving US 52 and ending at the Canadian border 7.3 miles (11.7 km) north of US 52. In Canada, the roadway continues as Saskatchewan Highway 9.

== Major intersections ==
County	Location	mi	km	Destinations	Notes
Adams	Hettinger Township	0.000	0.000	SD 75 south – Lodgepole	Southern terminus; continuation into South Dakota as South Dakota Highway 75
Adams	Hettinger Township	4.035	6.494	US 12 west – Bowman	Southern end of US 12 concurrency
Adams	Clermont Township	12.119	19.504	US 12 east – McIntosh	Northern end of US 12 concurrency
Hettinger	Farina–Chilton township line	37.816	60.859	ND 21 west – Regent, New England	Southern end of ND 21 concurrency
Hettinger	Mott	45.583	73.359	ND 21 east – Elgin	Northern end of ND 21 concurrency
Stark	Richardton	80.312	129.250	I-94 – Bismarck, Billings	I-94 exit 84
Dunn	Unorganized Territory of Halliday	112.215	180.593	ND 200 east – Dodge, Beulah	Southern end of ND 200 concurrency
Dunn	Halliday	113.807	183.155	ND 200 west / Lewis and Clark Trail – Killdeer	Northern end of ND 200 concurrency
Dunn	Unorganized Territory of Halliday	121.912	196.198	ND 1806 east / Lewis and Clark Trail to ND 200	
Dunn	Fort Berthold Indian Reservation	132.120	212.627	Road ends near Lake Sakakawea	
Gap in route
Mountrail	Fort Berthold Indian Reservation	132.121	212.628	ND 23 / ND 1804 / Lewis and Clark Trail – New Town, Parshall	Route resumes
Mountrail	Stanley	155.962	250.997	US 2 – Minot, Williston	
Mountrail–Burke county line	Lostwood–Vanville township line	173.390	279.044	ND 50 east – Coulee	Southern end of ND 50 concurrency
Burke	Vanville Township	174.140	280.251	ND 50 west – Powers Lake	Northern end of ND 50 concurrency
Burke	Bowbells	197.124	317.240	US 52 east / ND 5 east – Minot	Southern end of US 52 / ND 5 concurrency
Burke	Minnesota–North Star township line	203.888	328.126	US 52 west / ND 5 west – Portal, Crosby	Northern end of US 52 / ND 5 concurrency
Northgate Border Crossing		211.321	340.088	Canada–United States border	
Northgate Border Crossing		211.321	340.088	Highway 9 north	Continuation into Canada
1.000 mi = 1.609 km; 1.000 km = 0.621 mi: Concurrency terminus
