= Gilstrap =

Gilstrap is a surname. Notable people with the surname include:

- Bob Gilstrap (born 1974), American mixed martial artist
- Chena Gilstrap (died 2002), American football coach
- Gilstrap baronets, short-lived United Kingdom baronetcy of one baronet (1887–96)
- Harriet Patrick Gilstrap (1870–1974), American educator and pioneer
- Hunter Gilstrap (born 1983), American soccer player
- James Rodney Gilstrap (born 1957), American judge from Texas
- Jim Gilstrap (1946-2026), American singer
- Jim Gilstrap (coach) (1942–2007), American football coach
- Mark Gilstrap (born 1952), American politician from Kansas

== Other ==
- Gilstrap Township, Adams County, North Dakota, USA
- Gilstrap, Kentucky
