= Bucyrus =

Bucyrus may refer to:

== Places in the United States ==
- Bucyrus, Kansas
- Bucyrus, Missouri
- Bucyrus, North Dakota
- Bucyrus, Ohio
- Bucyrus Township (disambiguation)

== Other uses ==
- Bucyrus International, a mining and earth-moving equipment manufacturer, now owned by Caterpillar, Inc.
