= Bucyrus Township, Adams County, North Dakota =

Bucyrus Township, North Dakota
- Township
- Township of Bucyrus
- Location in Adams County
- Coordinates: 46°04′32″N 102°48′32″W
- Country: United States
- State: North Dakota
- County: Adams

Area
  - Total: 35.58 sq mi (92.2 km^{2})
  - Land: 35.58 sq mi (92.2 km^{2})
  - Water: 0 sq mi (0.00 km^{2})
- Elevation: 2,812 ft (857 m)

Population (2020)
  - Total: 26
  - Density: 0.73/sq mi (0.28/km^{2})
- Time zone: UTC-7 (Mountain (MST))
  - Summer (DST): UTC-6 (MDT)
- ZIP codes: 58639 (Hettinger); 58649 (Reeder)
- Area code: 701
- FIPS code: 38-10340
- GNIS feature ID: 1037244

Bucyrus Township is a township in Adams County, North Dakota, United States. As of the 2020 census, its population was 26, down from 27 in 2010.

Bucyrus Township surrounds the city of Bucyrus.

== Geography ==
Bucyrus Township has a total area of 35.58 square miles (92.2 km^{2}), all land.

=== Major highways ===
- U.S. Highway 12

== Demographics ==
As of the 2023 American Community Survey, there were an estimated 14 households with a margin of error of 12. The unemployment rate was approximately 28%, and 40% of residents have a Bachelor's Degree or higher.

As of the 2020 census, 1 resident was recorded to be Hispanic or Latino of any race.
