= KZRN =

Radio station in Hettinger, North Dakota

Coordinates: 46.6839°N 101.1708°W

Hettinger, North Dakota; United States
- Broadcast area: Adams County, North Dakota; Perkins County, South Dakota
- Frequency: 102.3 MHz

Programming
- Format: Country; Classic Hits

Ownership
- Owner: MidNation Media; (Jeff Hallen)
- Sister stations: Hirange Media Corp Inc

History
- Former call signs: KNDH (2008–2017)

Technical information
- Licensing authority: FCC
- Class: C3
- Power: 7,500 watts
- HAAT: 66 meters

Links
- Public license information: Public file; LMS
- Webcast: KZRN Webstream
- Website: KZRN Online

KZRN is a radio station serving the Hettinger, North Dakota area. It broadcast's on FM frequency 102.3 MHz and is under ownership of Jeff Hallen, through licensee Hirange Media Corp Inc.

The license to cover was granted on February 18, 2011. The transmitter site is northwest of Hettinger, on 2nd Avenue NW.

== History ==
The station received its license to cover on February 18, 2011, following an earlier construction permit that initially planned for the 93.5 MHz frequency. The unbuilt construction permit was held by Alma Corporation, who sold the station to MidNation Media for $25,000, outbidding Randy Michaels’ Radioactive LLC by $2,000 in the 2006 FCC auction. Subsequently, the Federal Communications Commission (FCC) said that it was selling the construction permit to MidNation for $60,000. From that point on, the deal was closed.

Effective September 4, 2018, MidNation Media LLC sold KZRN to Hirange Media Corp Inc for $65,000. Most recently, KZRN was purchased by Sidestream Media, LLC (owned by Scott and Kalli Zimmerman) in a sale agreement reached in late 2024.
