= Martin Hersrud =

American politician (1880–1969)

Martin Hersrud (9 May 1880 – August 1969) was a Republican member of the North Dakota House of Representatives from 1911 to 1912. It was his first and only term in the House. He represented Adams County in the 49th Legislative District.

== Personal life ==
Martin Hersrud was born in Allamakee County, Iowa. His parents moved to Fillmore County, Minnesota, in 1883, where Hersrud lived and obtained his early education. He moved to South Dakota at age 25. He later settled in Adams County, North Dakota, near the village of Petrel where he homesteaded during 1916. He was married with one child, a daughter.

== Political career ==
Hersrud was elected as a Republican to the 12th Legislative Assembly of the North Dakota House of Representatives in 1910 and served one term (1911–1912) representing the 49th Legislative District. He died in Lemmon, Perkins County, South Dakota.
