= Henry J. Stinger =

American politician (1857–1925)

Henry J. Stinger (1857–1925) was a Republican member of the North Dakota House of Representatives from 1913 to 1918. He lived in Spring Butte Township.

== Personal life ==
Henry Stinger was born in Cleveland, Ohio on March 6, 1857. He received his early education in the Cleveland high school system and White's Private Academy. He moved to Minnesota at age 14 and later to Nebraska at age 25. Henry and his wife, Sofia, had eight children, and they lived on a rented farm during their time in Nebraska. Stinger filed for a homestead in Spring Butte Township after learning of "free" land that was available. Later that year, the family left Nebraska and began farming on the homestead.

In October 1925, Mr. Stinger's health began to fail, so he and his wife moved to Struble, Iowa, to live with their son. Henry died just four days after arriving in Iowa, on a visit to his two other sons in Allen, Nebraska. Mrs. Stinger lived in Iowa until 1929 before moving to Mobridge, South Dakota to live with her daughter. Mrs. Stinger died in 1948.

== Political career ==
Henry Stinger served three terms in the North Dakota House of Representatives as a Republican from 1913 to 1918. He represented Adams County in the 49th Legislative District. Due to district changes, his district later included Hettinger and Sioux Counties. He previously served as a county commissioner and held several minor township and school district offices.
