= Chandler Township =

Chandler Township may refer to one of the following places in the United States:

- Chandler Township, Charlevoix County, Michigan
- Chandler Township, Huron County, Michigan
- Chandler Township, Adams County, North Dakota

== See also ==
- Chandler (disambiguation)
