= Clermont Township =

Clermont Township may refer to the following townships in the United States:

- Clermont Township, Fayette County, Iowa
- Clermont Township, Adams County, North Dakota

== See also ==
- Clermont, Abitibi-Témiscamingue, Quebec, a township municipality in Quebec, Canada
