= Duck Creek Township =

Duck Creek Township may refer to the following townships in the United States:

- Duck Creek Township, Madison County, Indiana
- Duck Creek Township, Adams County, North Dakota
