= Whetstone Township =

Whetstone Township may refer to the following townships in the United States:

- Whetstone Township, Adams County, North Dakota
- Whetstone Township, Crawford County, Ohio
