= Maine Township =

Maine Township may refer to:

- Maine Township, Cook County, Illinois
- Maine Township, Grundy County, Illinois
- Maine Township, Linn County, Iowa
- Maine Township, Otter Tail County, Minnesota
- Maine Township, Adams County, North Dakota
