= Jordan Township, Adams County, North Dakota =

Coordinates: 46°08′25″N 102°18′06″W

Jordan Township is a defunct civil township in Adams County, North Dakota, USA. The 1960 census recorded a population of 90.

The township dissolved prior to the 1980 Census, when it was combined with Cedar Butte, Dakota, Kansas City, and Spring Butte Townships to form the Census-designated East Adams Unorganized Territory. As of the 1990 Census, the combined area had a population of 146.
