= Holden Township =

Holden Township may refer to the following townships in the United States:

- Holden Township, Goodhue County, Minnesota
- Holden Township, Adams County, North Dakota
