= Northgate, Saskatchewan =

Community in Saskatchewan, Canada

- Unorganized hamlet
- Location within Saskatchewan Location within Canada
- Coordinates: 49°00′00″N 102°16′02″W
- Country: Canada
- Province: Saskatchewan
- Rural municipality: Enniskillen No. 3
- Time zone: UTC-6 (Central (CST))
  - Summer (DST): UTC-5 (CDT)
- Area code: 306

Northgate is an unorganized hamlet in southeastern Saskatchewan, Canada, within the Rural Municipality of Enniskillen No. 3. It is located along the Canada–United States border across from the community of Northgate, North Dakota. Access is from Highway 9.

Almost all of the remaining town was razed in 2013–2014 to make room for an extension of the Canadian National Railway.

== See also ==
- List of communities in Saskatchewan
- Northgate Border Crossing
