= Cedar Township, Adams County, North Dakota =

Township in Adams County, North Dakota

Cedar Township, North Dakota
- Township
- Township of Cedar
- Coordinates: 46°14′39″N 102°41′3″W
- Country: United States
- State: North Dakota
- County: Adams

Area
  - Total: 31.66 sq mi (82.0 km^{2})
  - Land: 31.65 sq mi (82.0 km^{2})
  - Water: 0.007 sq mi (0.018 km^{2})
- Elevation: 2,598 ft (792 m)

Population (2020)
  - Total: 6
  - Density: 0.19/sq mi (0.073/km^{2})
- Area code: 701
- GNIS feature ID: 1037235

Cedar Township is a township in Adams County, North Dakota, United States. As of the 2020 census, its population was 6, down from 24 at the 2010 census.
