= North Lemmon, North Dakota =

- Unincorporated community
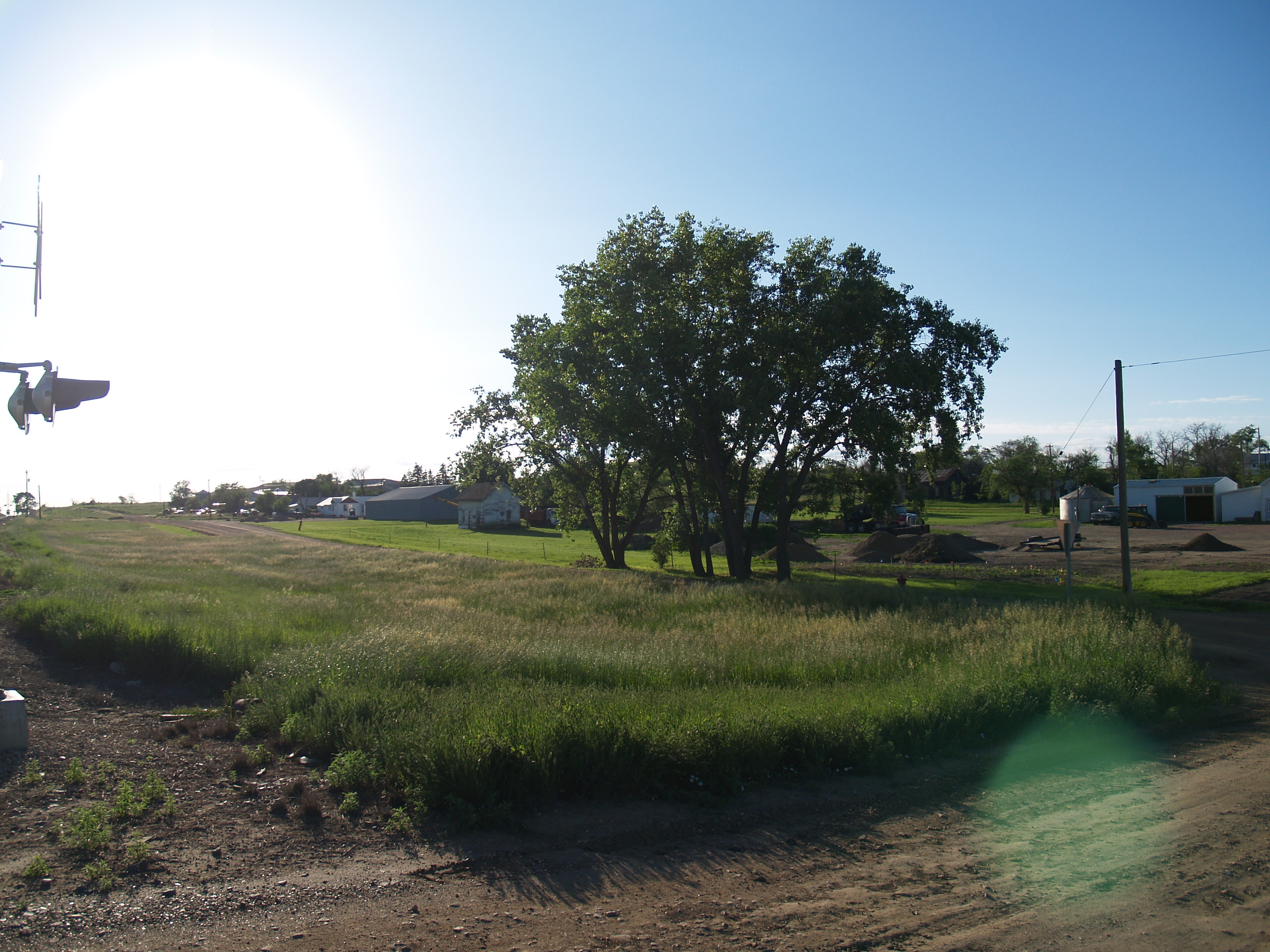
- View of North Lemmon from just across the railroad tracks from Lemmon, South Dakota

- Location in North Dakota Location in the United States
- Coordinates: 45°56′46″N 102°09′28″W
- Country: United States
- State: North Dakota
- County: Adams
- Named after: George E. Lemmon
- Elevation: 2,579 ft (786 m)
- Time zone: UTC-7 (Mountain (MST))
  - Summer (DST): UTC-6 (MDT)
- ZIP Code: 57638
- Area code: 701
- FIPS code: 38-57940
- GNIS feature ID: 1030466

North Lemmon is an unincorporated community in Adams County, North Dakota, United States. A local landowner, George E. Lemmon, is the town's namesake.

== History ==
The community was a station along the Milwaukee Railroad, now served by the BNSF Railway.

== Geography ==
North Lemmon is located just across the South Dakota border from the city of Lemmon. North Lemmon is actually an extension of Lemmon, and includes all of the community that lies in North Dakota. North Lemmon was part of North Lemmon Township, until the township dissolved in 1999. North Lemmon is now included in the Census-designated East Adams Unorganized Territory.

== Demographics ==
The United States Census Bureau does not provide specific population or other demographic information. North Lemmon Township returned a population of 81 as of the 1990 Census, with an estimated population of 66 when the township dissolved in 1999.
