= Grand River Township, Perkins County, South Dakota =

Grand River Township, South Dakota
- Township
- Location within South Dakota
- Coordinates: 45°53′10″N 102°37′53″W
- Country: United States
- State: South Dakota
- County: Perkins

Area
  - Total: 51.7 sq mi (134 km^{2})

Population (2020)
  - Total: 51
  - Density: 1/sq mi (0.39/km^{2})

Grand River Township is a township in Perkins County, in the U.S. state of South Dakota. As of the 2020 census, it contains 51 people and 32 households.

== Major highways ==
South Dakota Highway 75
