= Argonne Township, Adams County, North Dakota =

Coordinates: 46°09′15″N 102°37′26″W

Argonne Township is a defunct civil township in Adams County, North Dakota, United States. The 1960 census recorded a population of 90.

The township dissolved prior to the 1980 Census, when it was combined with Holt Township to form the Census-designated Central Adams Unorganized Territory. As of the 2000 Census, the combined area had a population of 64.
