= Lightning Creek Township, Adams County, North Dakota =

Township in Adams County, North Dakota

Lightning Creek Township, North Dakota
- Township
- Township of Lightning Creek
- Coordinates: 46°00′45″N 102°55′32″W
- Country: United States
- State: North Dakota
- County: Adams

Area
  - Total: 36.06 sq mi (93.4 km^{2})
  - Land: 36.06 sq mi (93.4 km^{2})
  - Water: 0 sq mi (0 km^{2})
- Elevation: 2,694 ft (821 m)

Population (2020)
  - Total: 21
  - Density: 0.58/sq mi (0.22/km^{2})
- Area code: 701
- GNIS feature ID: 1034174

Lightning Creek Township is a township in Adams County, North Dakota, United States. As of the 2010 census, its population was 14.
