= East Adams, North Dakota =

- Unorganized territory

- Location within North Dakota
- Coordinates: 46°05′49″N 102°16′40″W
- Country: United States
- State: North Dakota
- County: Adams

Area
  - Total: 215.7 sq mi (558.7 km^{2})
  - Land: 215.6 sq mi (558.4 km^{2})
  - Water: 0.12 sq mi (0.3 km^{2})
- Elevation: 2,484 ft (757 m)

Population (2020)
  - Total: 194
  - Density: 0.900/sq mi (0.347/km^{2})
- Time zone: UTC-6 (Central (CST))
  - Summer (DST): UTC-5 (CDT)
- Area code: 701
- GNIS feature ID: 1036002

East Adams is an unorganized territory in Adams County, North Dakota, United States. As of the 2010 census it had a population of 161. East Adams comprises the territory of the former townships of Cedar Butte, Dakota, Kansas City, Spring Butte, and North Lemmon.

The unincorporated community of North Lemmon is located on the southern border of East Adams.
