= Lemmon Township, Adams County, North Dakota =

Coordinates: 46°07′20″N 102°56′02″W

Lemmon Township is a defunct civil township in Adams County, North Dakota, USA. The 1970 census recorded a population of 87.

The township dissolved prior to the 1980 Census, when the United States Census Bureau began referring to the area as Lemmon Unorganized Territory. As of the 2000 Census, the area had a population of 29. Lemmon Unorganized Territory was combined with Whetstone Township in 2006 to create West Adams Unorganized Territory.
