= Bucyrus Township =

Bucyrus Township may refer to the following townships in the United States:

- Bucyrus Township, Adams County, North Dakota
- Bucyrus Township, Ohio
