= Dakota Township, Adams County, North Dakota =

Township in North Dakota, US

Coordinates: 46°04′38″N 102°18′30″W

Dakota Township is a defunct civil township in Adams County, North Dakota, United States. The 1960 census recorded a population of 63.

The township dissolved prior to the 1980 Census, when it was combined with Cedar Butte, Jordan, Kansas City and Spring Butte Townships to form the Census-designated East Adams Unorganized Territory. As of the 1990 Census, the combined area had a population of 146.
