= Kansas City Township, Adams County, North Dakota =

Coordinates: 46°04′33″N 102°26′06″W

Kansas City Township was a civil township in Adams County, North Dakota, United States. The 1960 census recorded a population of 75.

The township dissolved prior to the 1980 Census, when it was combined with Cedar Butte, Dakota, Jordan, and Spring Butte Townships to form the Census-designated East Adams Unorganized Territory. As of the 1990 Census, the combined area had a population of 146.
