= Taylor Butte Township, Adams County, North Dakota =

Township in Adams County, North Dakota

Taylor Butte Township, North Dakota
- Township
- Township of Taylor Butte
- Coordinates: 46°09′22″N 102°33′09″W
- Country: United States
- State: North Dakota
- County: Adams

Area
  - Total: 35.90 sq mi (93.0 km^{2})
  - Land: 35.89 sq mi (93.0 km^{2})
  - Water: 0.01 sq mi (0.026 km^{2})
- Elevation: 2,562 ft (781 m)

Population (2020)
  - Total: 25
  - Density: 0.70/sq mi (0.27/km^{2})
- Area code: 701
- GNIS feature ID: 1037209

Taylor Butte Township is a township in Adams County, North Dakota, United States. As of the 2010 census, its population was 14.
