= Central Adams, North Dakota =

- Unorganized territory

- Location within North Dakota
- Coordinates: 46°07′10″N 102°41′07″W
- Country: United States
- State: North Dakota
- County: Adams

Area
  - Total: 71.93 sq mi (186.31 km^{2})
  - Land: 71.92 sq mi (186.26 km^{2})
  - Water: 0.019 sq mi (0.05 km^{2})
- Elevation: 2,710 ft (826 m)

Population (2020)
  - Total: 72
  - Density: 1.0/sq mi (0.39/km^{2})
- Time zone: UTC-6 (Central (CST))
  - Summer (DST): UTC-5 (CDT)
- Area code: 701
- GNIS feature ID: 1035962

Central Adams is an unorganized territory in Adams County, North Dakota, United States. As of the 2020 census it had a population of 72. Central Adams comprises the territory of the former townships of Holt and Argonne.
