= Wolf Butte Township, Adams County, North Dakota =

Township in Adams County, North Dakota

Wolf Butte Township, North Dakota
- Township
- Township of Wolf Butte
- Coordinates: 46°08′25″N 102°48′25″W
- Country: United States
- State: North Dakota
- County: Adams

Area
  - Total: 35.94 sq mi (93.1 km^{2})
  - Land: 35.89 sq mi (93.0 km^{2})
  - Water: 0.05 sq mi (0.13 km^{2})
- Elevation: 2,818 ft (859 m)

Population (2020)
  - Total: 40
  - Density: 1.1/sq mi (0.43/km^{2})
- Area code: 701
- GNIS feature ID: 1037202

Wolf Butte Township is a township in Adams County, North Dakota, United States. As of the 2010 census, its population was 25. Lewis O. Richardson, longtime North Dakota legislator, is buried here.
