= Orange Township, Adams County, North Dakota =

Township in Adams County, North Dakota

Orange Township, North Dakota
- Township
- Township of Orange
- Coordinates: 45°58′45″N 102°03′10″W
- Country: United States
- State: North Dakota
- County: Adams

Area
  - Total: 35.97 sq mi (93.2 km^{2})
  - Land: 35.84 sq mi (92.8 km^{2})
  - Water: 0.13 sq mi (0.34 km^{2})
- Elevation: 2,480 ft (756 m)

Population (2020)
  - Total: 11
  - Density: 0.31/sq mi (0.12/km^{2})
- Area code: 701
- GNIS feature ID: 1037214

Orange Township is a township in Adams County, North Dakota, United States. As of the 2010 census, its population was 22.
