= Holden, North Dakota =

- Unorganized territory

- Location within North Dakota
- Coordinates: 45°59′19″N 102°48′31″W
- Country: United States
- State: North Dakota
- County: Adams

Area
  - Total: 35.9 sq mi (93.1 km^{2})
  - Land: 35.9 sq mi (93.1 km^{2})
  - Water: 0 sq mi (0 km^{2})
- Elevation: 2,703 ft (824 m)

Population (2020)
  - Total: 29
  - Density: 0.81/sq mi (0.31/km^{2})
- Time zone: UTC-6 (Central (CST))
  - Summer (DST): UTC-5 (CDT)
- Area code: 701
- GNIS feature ID: 2393286

Holden is an unorganized territory in Adams County, North Dakota, United States. As of the 2010 census it had a population of 21. Holden comprises the territory of former Holden Township, which was dissolved following the 1990 census.
