= Marshall, North Dakota =

- Unincorporated community
- Location within the state of North Dakota Marshall (the United States)
- Coordinates: 47°8′17″N 102°19′59″W
- Country: United States
- State: North Dakota
- County: Dunn
- Elevation: 1,982 ft (604 m)
- Time zone: UTC-6 (Central (CST))
  - Summer (DST): UTC-5 (CDT)
- ZIP code: 58644
- Area code: 701
- GNIS feature ID: 1030104

Marshall is an unincorporated community in southeastern Dunn County, North Dakota, United States. It lies along North Dakota Highway 8 east-southeast of the city of Manning, the county seat of Dunn County.
