= South Dakota Highway 75 =

State highway in South Dakota, United States

Highway 75

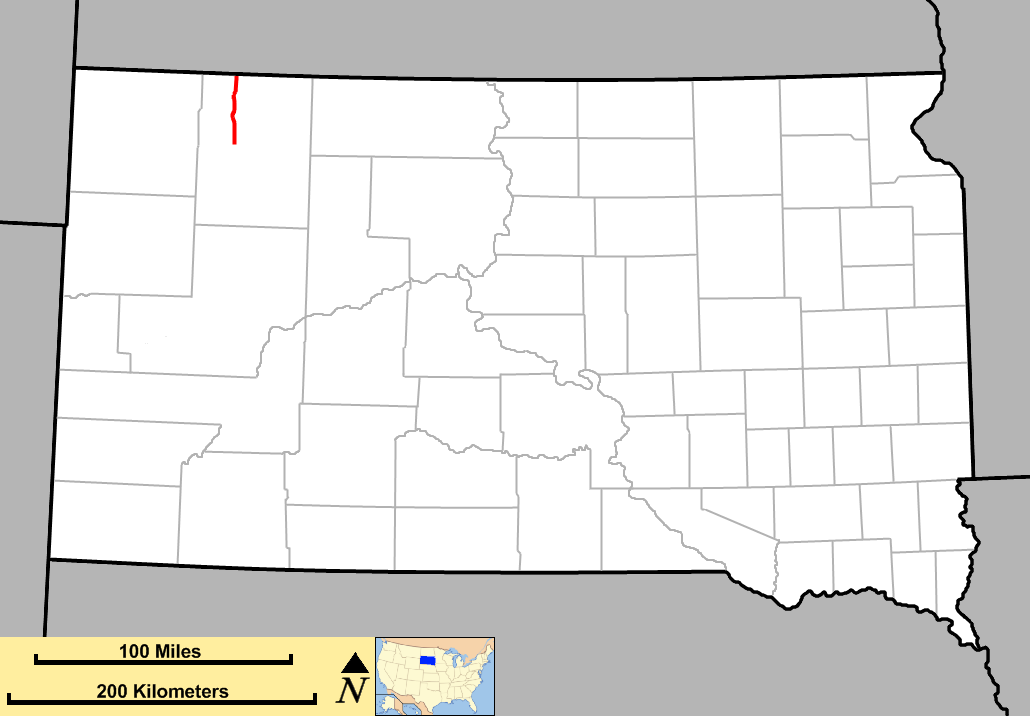
- Route of SD 75 (in red)

Route information
- Maintained by SDDOT
- Length: 29.352 mi (47.237 km)
- Existed: 1976–present

Major junctions
- South end: SD 20 west of Bison
- North end: ND 8 south of Hettinger, ND

Location
- Country: United States
- State: South Dakota
- Counties: Perkins

Highway system
- South Dakota State Trunk Highway System; Interstate; US; State
← SD 73	→ SD 79

South Dakota Highway 75 (SD 75) is a state route located in northwest South Dakota. The southern terminus is at South Dakota Highway 20 west of Bison, and the route runs northerly to the North Dakota border, becoming North Dakota Highway 8. It is 28 miles (45 kilometers) in length.

== History ==
This is the third use of the South Dakota 75 designation.

The first South Dakota 75 was designated around 1934, in southeast Shannon County. It was originally 10 miles (16 km) long, with its northern terminus at U.S. Highway 18. When that route was realigned southward, SD 75 was shortened to 3 miles (4.8 km). This configuration remained in place until 1976, when it was redesignated as South Dakota Highway 391.

The second use of SD 75 was implemented around 1949, in northwest South Dakota. It was located in northeast Harding County, beginning at South Dakota Highway 8 (current SD 20) and extending northward to the North Dakota border. In 1976, the SD 75 designation was moved approximately 18 miles (29 km) east onto its current alignment, where it remains today; the old segment became part of South Dakota Highway 79.

== Major intersections ==
The entire route is in Perkins County.

Location	mi	km	Destinations	Notes
Scotch Cap Township	0.000	0.000	SD 20	
Grand River Township	29.352	47.237	ND 8 north	Continuation beyond North Dakota state line
1.000 mi = 1.609 km; 1.000 km = 0.621 mi
