= Rural Municipality of Enniskillen No. 3 =

Rural municipality in Saskatchewan, Canada

Enniskillen No. 3
- Rural municipality
- Rural Municipality of Enniskillen No. 3
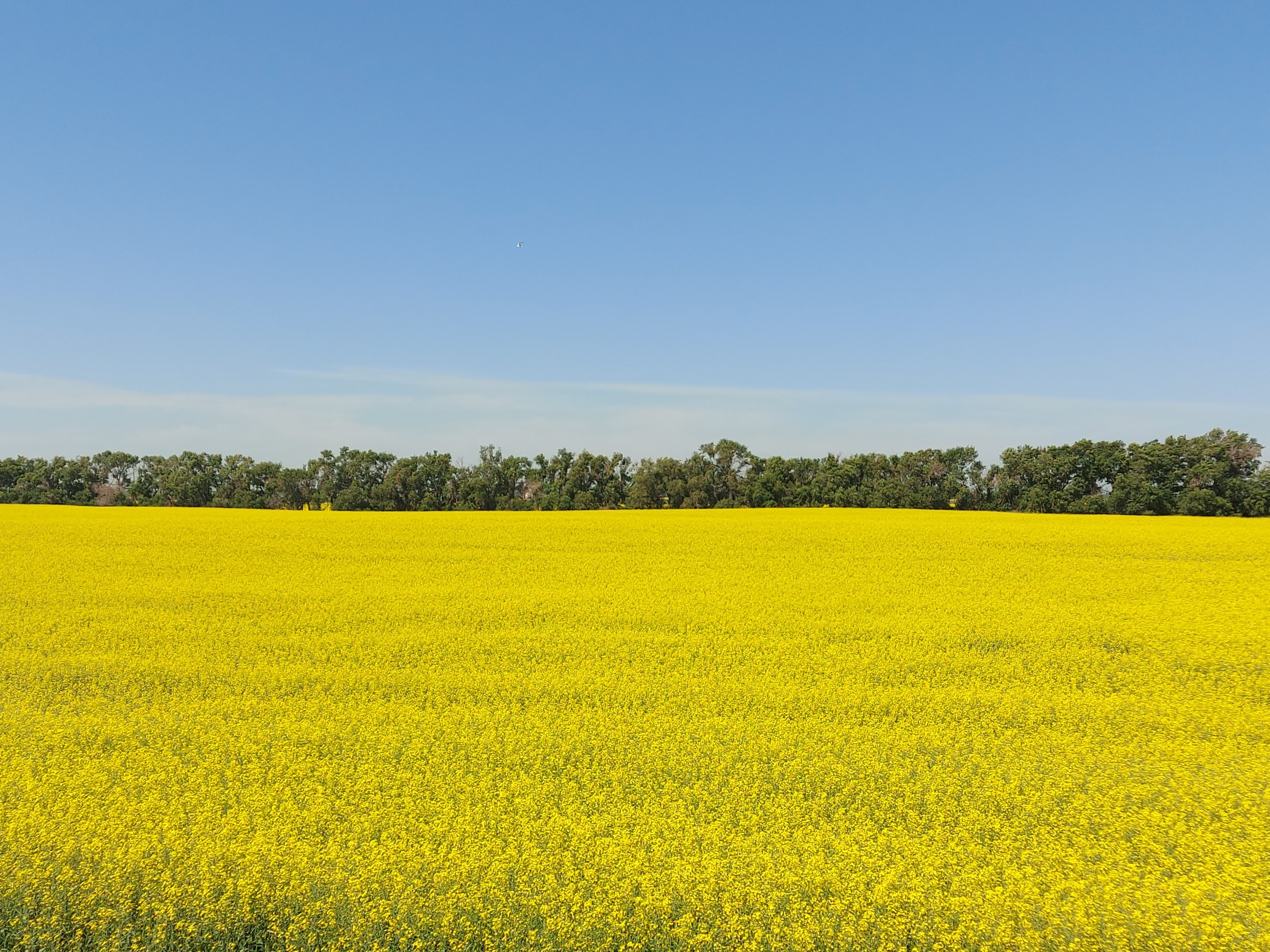
- Canola in bloom

- Location of the RM of Enniskillen No. 3 in Saskatchewan
- Coordinates: 49.162°N 102.207°W
- Country: Canada
- Province: Saskatchewan
- Census division: 1
- SARM division: 1
- Federal riding: Souris—Moose Mountain
- Provincial riding: Cannington
- Formed: December 13, 1909

Government
  - Reeve: Trevor Walls
  - Governing body: RM of Enniskillen No. 3 Council
  - Administrator: Pamela Bartlett
  - Office location: Oxbow

Area (2021)
  - Land: 820.04 km^{2} (316.62 sq mi)

Population (2021)
  - Total: 422
  - Density: 0.5/km^{2} (1.3/sq mi)
- Time zone: CST
  - Summer (DST): CST
- Postal code: S0C 2B0
- Area codes: 306 and 639

The Rural Municipality of Enniskillen No. 3 (2016 population: 459) is a rural municipality (RM) in the Canadian province of Saskatchewan within Census Division No. 1 and SARM Division No. 1. Located in the southeast portion of the province, it is adjacent to the United States border, neighbouring Burke County and Renville County both in North Dakota.

== History ==
The RM of Enniskillen No. 3 incorporated as a rural municipality on December 13, 1909. Sam McKnight came to the area from Durham County, Ontario, and served as chairman of the organizing committee for the RM. He seemed to have had his heart set on a northern Irish name, since his committee proposed Enniskillen, Derry, Antrim, Boyne, Alma, Fermanagh and Waterloo. The government selected the first name on the list which honours Enniskillen (inis Ceithleann, "Ceithle's island"), the country town of Fermanagh, Northern Ireland.

On June 9, 2026, an EF3 tornado occurred south of Alameda. It was the strongest tornado in Saskatchewan since 2010 and the strongest in Canada since 2023.

== Geography ==
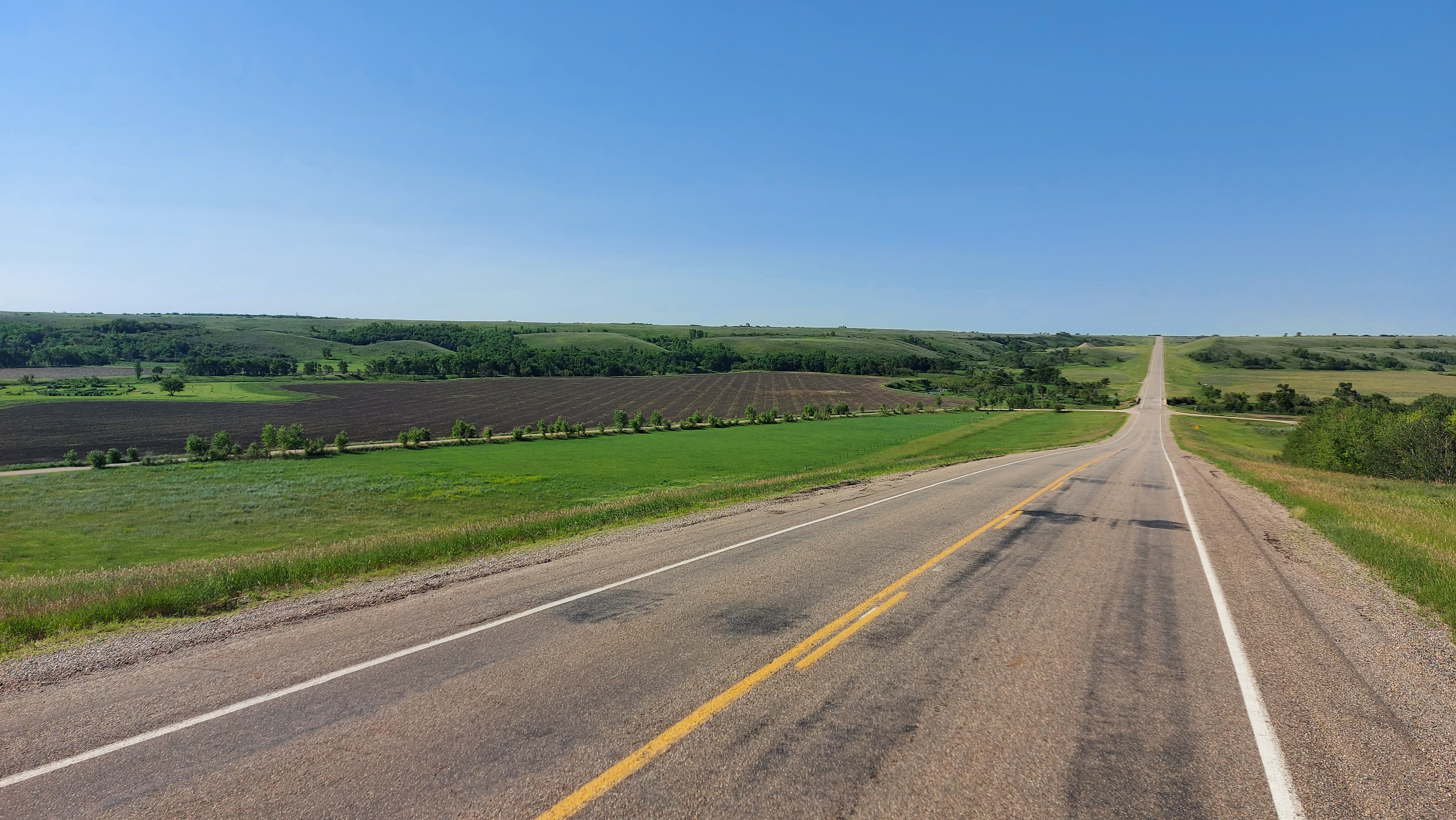
Highway 9 travelling through the Souris River Valley in the RM of Enniskillen No. 3

=== Communities and localities ===
The following urban municipalities are surrounded by the RM.

Towns

- Oxbow

Villages

- Glen Ewen

The following unincorporated communities are within the RM.

Localities

- Boscurvis
- Elcott
- Northgate
- Openshaw

== Demographics ==
Population history (1981–2016)
| Year | Pop. | ±% |
|---|---|---|
| 1981 | 657 | — |
| 1986 | 617 | −6.1% |
| 1991 | 545 | −11.7% |
| 1996 | 523 | −4.0% |
| 2001 | 478 | −8.6% |
| 2006 | 430 | −10.0% |
| 2011 | 452 | +5.1% |
| 2016 | 459 | +1.5% |
| 2021 | 422 | −8.1% |
Source: Statistics Canada via Saskatchewan Bureau of Statistics

In the 2021 Census of Population conducted by Statistics Canada, the RM of Enniskillen No. 3 had a population of 422 living in 167 of its 193 total private dwellings, a change of −8.1% from its 2016 population of 459. With a land area of 820.04 km^{2} (316.62 sq mi), it had a population density of 0.5/km^{2} (1.3/sq mi) in 2021.

In the 2016 Census of Population, the RM of Enniskillen No. 3 recorded a population of 459 living in 182 of its 201 total private dwellings, a 1.5% change from its 2011 population of 452. With a land area of 834.67 km^{2} (322.27 sq mi), it had a population density of 0.5/km^{2} (1.4/sq mi) in 2016.

== Government ==
The RM of Enniskillen No. 3 is governed by an elected municipal council and an appointed administrator that meets on the second Tuesday of every month. The reeve of the RM is Trevor Walls while its administrator is Pamela Bartlett. The RM's office is located in Oxbow.

== See also ==
- List of rural municipalities in Saskatchewan
