= Darling Springs Township, Adams County, North Dakota =

Township in Adams County, North Dakota

Darling Springs Township, North Dakota
- Township
- Township of Darling Springs
- Coordinates: 46°13′57″N 102°48′12″W
- Country: United States
- State: North Dakota
- County: Adams

Area
  - Total: 31.08 sq mi (80.5 km^{2})
  - Land: 31.08 sq mi (80.5 km^{2})
  - Water: 0 sq mi (0 km^{2})
- Elevation: 2,703 ft (824 m)

Population (2020)
  - Total: 36
  - Density: 1.2/sq mi (0.45/km^{2})
- Area code: 701
- GNIS feature ID: 1037222

Darling Springs Township is a township in Adams County, North Dakota, United States. As of the 2010 census, its population was 22.
