= Beisigl Township, Adams County, North Dakota =

Coordinates: 46.16667°N 102.0670955°W

Beisigl Township, North Dakota
- Township
- Township of Beisigl
- Location in Adams County
- Country: United States
- State: North Dakota
- County: Adams
- Organized: 1909

Area
  - Total: 36.05 sq mi (93.38 km^{2})
  - Land: 36.04 sq mi (93.35 km^{2})
  - Water: 0.012 sq mi (0.03 km^{2})

Population (2020)
  - Total: 26
  - Density: 0.72/sq mi (0.28/km^{2})
- Area code: 701
- FIPS code: 38-05700
- GNIS feature ID: 1759233

Beisigl Township is a township in Adams County, North Dakota, United States. As of the 2010 census, its population was 22.
