= Northgate, North Dakota =

Community in North Dakota, United States

- Unincorporated community
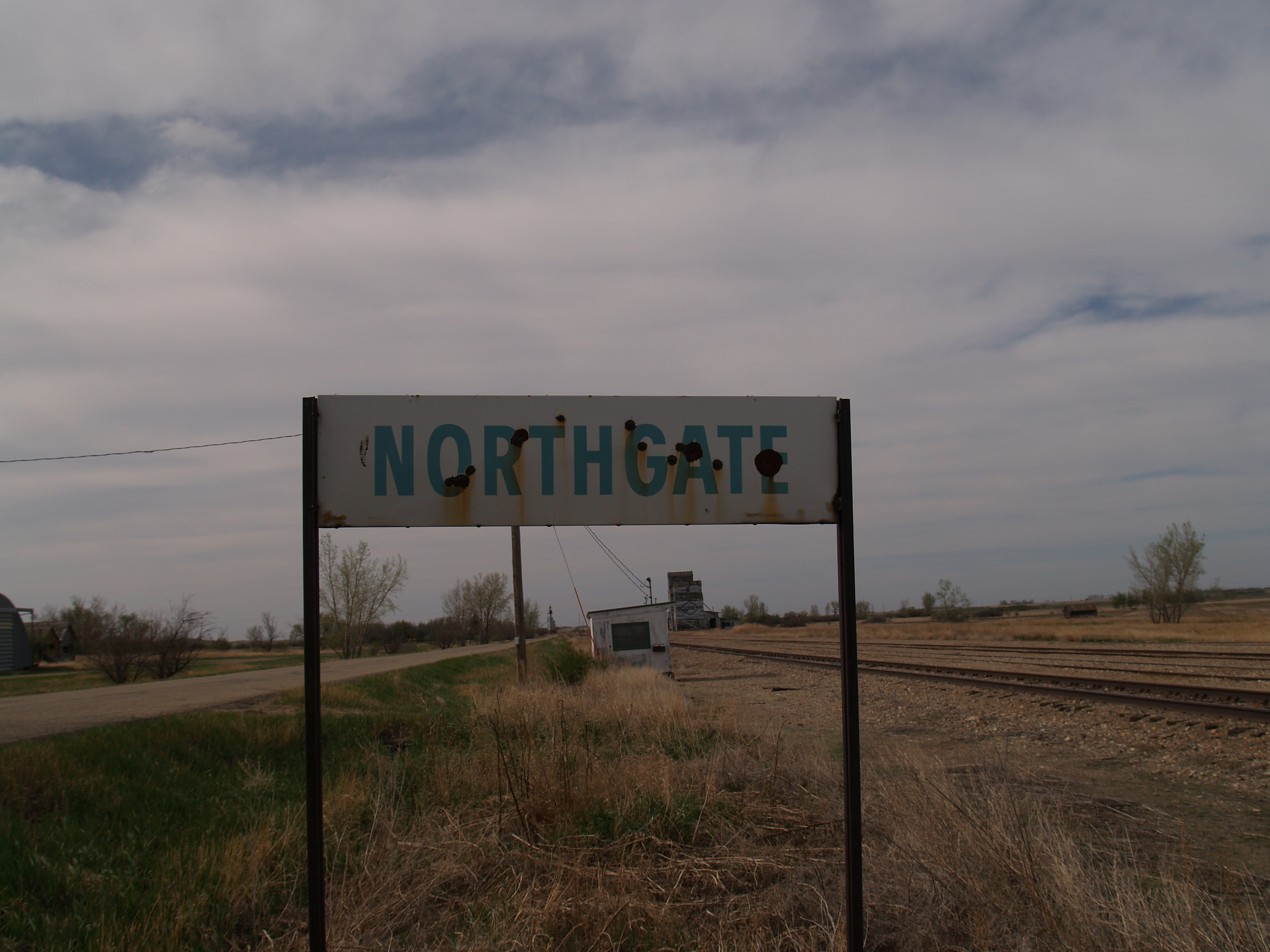

- Location within North Dakota Location within the United States
- Coordinates: 48°59′27″N 102°15′44″W
- Country: United States
- State: North Dakota
- County: Burke
- Elevation: 1,860 ft (570 m)
- Time zone: UTC-6 (Central (CST))
  - Summer (DST): UTC-5 (CDT)
- ZIP code: 58737
- Area code: 701
- GNIS feature ID: 1030491

Northgate is an unincorporated community in Burke County, North Dakota, United States. The community is adjacent to the U.S. border with Canada, and it shares its name with the neighboring Canadian settlement of Northgate, Saskatchewan. The community is served by North Dakota Highway 8. Northgate had its own post office until 1985.

The former Port of Entry building was razed in 2014–2015. Almost all of Northgate, Saskatchewan, was razed in 2013–2014 to make room for an extension of the Canadian National Railway.

== Climate ==
Climate data for Northgate 5 ESE, North Dakota, 1991–2020 normals: 1842ft (561m)
| Month | Jan | Feb | Mar | Apr | May | Jun | Jul | Aug | Sep | Oct | Nov | Dec | Year |
|---|---|---|---|---|---|---|---|---|---|---|---|---|---|
| Record high °F (°C) | 53 (12) | 53 (12) | 75 (24) | 85 (29) | 91 (33) | 95 (35) | 101 (38) | 103 (39) | 93 (34) | 86 (30) | 74 (23) | 51 (11) | 103 (39) |
| Mean maximum °F (°C) | 41.0 (5.0) | 37.2 (2.9) | 56.6 (13.7) | 74.5 (23.6) | 87.0 (30.6) | 90.1 (32.3) | 94.4 (34.7) | 93.3 (34.1) | 88.8 (31.6) | 73.7 (23.2) | 58.7 (14.8) | 41.5 (5.3) | 92.5 (33.6) |
| Mean daily maximum °F (°C) | 18.1 (−7.7) | 20.9 (−6.2) | 33.2 (0.7) | 51.7 (10.9) | 64.9 (18.3) | 72.7 (22.6) | 78.1 (25.6) | 78.3 (25.7) | 68.5 (20.3) | 52.3 (11.3) | 34.1 (1.2) | 21.3 (−5.9) | 49.5 (9.7) |
| Daily mean °F (°C) | 8.0 (−13.3) | 11.1 (−11.6) | 23.4 (−4.8) | 39.1 (3.9) | 51.6 (10.9) | 60.9 (16.1) | 65.4 (18.6) | 64.3 (17.9) | 54.7 (12.6) | 40.1 (4.5) | 24.3 (−4.3) | 12.1 (−11.1) | 37.9 (3.3) |
| Mean daily minimum °F (°C) | −2.0 (−18.9) | 1.3 (−17.1) | 13.6 (−10.2) | 26.5 (−3.1) | 38.3 (3.5) | 49.1 (9.5) | 52.7 (11.5) | 50.2 (10.1) | 41.0 (5.0) | 28.0 (−2.2) | 14.6 (−9.7) | 3.0 (−16.1) | 26.4 (−3.1) |
| Mean minimum °F (°C) | −29.2 (−34.0) | −25.7 (−32.1) | −14.2 (−25.7) | 7.8 (−13.4) | 23.6 (−4.7) | 38.1 (3.4) | 43.8 (6.6) | 38.7 (3.7) | 27.2 (−2.7) | 13.1 (−10.5) | −8.1 (−22.3) | −23.6 (−30.9) | −31.4 (−35.2) |
| Record low °F (°C) | −39 (−39) | −37 (−38) | −30 (−34) | −9 (−23) | 19 (−7) | 30 (−1) | 38 (3) | 33 (1) | 18 (−8) | 1 (−17) | −26 (−32) | −36 (−38) | −39 (−39) |
| Average precipitation inches (mm) | 0.40 (10) | 0.37 (9.4) | 0.63 (16) | 0.91 (23) | 2.27 (58) | 3.70 (94) | 2.51 (64) | 1.37 (35) | 1.49 (38) | 1.04 (26) | 0.54 (14) | 0.46 (12) | 15.69 (399.4) |
Source 1: NOAA
Source 2: XMACIS (temp records & monthly max/mins)

== See also ==
- Northgate Border Crossing
