= Holt Township, Adams County, North Dakota =

Coordinates: 46°04′38″N 102°41′0″W

Holt Township was a civil township in Adams County, North Dakota, United States. The 1960 census recorded a population of 69.

The township dissolved prior to the 1980 Census, when it was combined with Argonne Township to form the Census-designated Central Adams Unorganized Territory. As of the 2000 Census, the combined area had a population of 64.
