= Scott Township, Adams County, North Dakota =

Township in Adams County, North Dakota

Scott Township, North Dakota
- Township
- Township of Scott
- Coordinates: 45°58′45″N 102°33′07″W
- Country: United States
- State: North Dakota
- County: Adams

Area
  - Total: 36.05 sq mi (93.4 km^{2})
  - Land: 35.84 sq mi (92.8 km^{2})
  - Water: 0.21 sq mi (0.54 km^{2})
- Elevation: 2,602 ft (793 m)

Population (2020)
  - Total: 85
  - Density: 2.4/sq mi (0.92/km^{2})
- Area code: 701
- GNIS feature ID: 1037219

Scott Township is a township in Adams County, North Dakota, United States. As of the 2010 census, its population was 106.
