= West Adams, North Dakota =

- Unorganized territory

- Location within North Dakota
- Coordinates: 46°12′01″N 102°55′59″W
- Country: United States
- State: North Dakota
- County: Adams

Area
  - Total: 67.0 sq mi (173.4 km^{2})
  - Land: 66.9 sq mi (173.2 km^{2})
  - Water: 0.077 sq mi (0.2 km^{2})
- Elevation: 2,831 ft (863 m)

Population (2020)
  - Total: 50
  - Density: 0.75/sq mi (0.29/km^{2})
- Time zone: UTC-6 (Central (CST))
  - Summer (DST): UTC-5 (CDT)
- Area code: 701
- GNIS feature ID: 1036002

West Adams is an unorganized territory in Adams County, North Dakota, United States. As of the 2010 census it had a population of 34. West Adams comprises the territory of the former townships of Lemmon and Whetstone.
