= Reeder Township, Adams County, North Dakota =

Township in Adams County, North Dakota

Reeder Township, North Dakota
- Township
- Township of Reeder
- Coordinates: 46°04′35″N 102°55′47″W
- Country: United States
- State: North Dakota
- County: Adams

Area
  - Total: 35.15 sq mi (91.0 km^{2})
  - Land: 34.99 sq mi (90.6 km^{2})
  - Water: 0.16 sq mi (0.41 km^{2})
- Elevation: 2,720 ft (830 m)

Population (2020)
  - Total: 49
  - Density: 1.4/sq mi (0.54/km^{2})
- Area code: 701
- GNIS feature ID: 1037237

Reeder Township is a township in Adams County, North Dakota, United States. As of the 2010 census, its population was 39.

Reeder Township surrounds one city, Reeder.
