= South Fork Township, Adams County, North Dakota =

Township in Adams County, North Dakota

South Fork Township, North Dakota
- Township
- Township of South Fork
- Coordinates: 46°03′59″N 102°03′41″W
- Country: United States
- State: North Dakota
- County: Adams

Area
  - Total: 36.1 sq mi (93 km^{2})
  - Land: 36.1 sq mi (93 km^{2})
  - Water: 0 sq mi (0 km^{2})
- Elevation: 2,375 ft (724 m)

Population (2020)
  - Total: 22
  - Density: 0.61/sq mi (0.24/km^{2})
- Area code: 701
- GNIS feature ID: 1037252

South Fork Township is a township in Adams County, North Dakota, United States. As of the 2010 census, its population was 11.
