= Cedar Butte Township, Adams County, North Dakota =

Township in Adams County, North Dakota

Coordinates: 46°03′46″N 102°11′14″W

Cedar Butte Township is a defunct civil township in Adams County, North Dakota, USA. The 1960 census recorded a population of 75.

The township dissolved prior to the 1980 Census, when it was combined with Dakota, Jordan, Kansas City and Spring Butte Townships to form the Census-designated East Adams Unorganized Territory. As of the 1990 Census, the combined area had a population of 146.
