= Gilstrap Township, Adams County, North Dakota =

Township in Adams County, North Dakota

Gilstrap Township, North Dakota
- Township
- Township of Gilstrap
- Coordinates: 45°59′18″N 102°18′37″W
- Country: United States
- State: North Dakota
- County: Adams

Area
  - Total: 35.96 sq mi (93.1 km^{2})
  - Land: 35.95 sq mi (93.1 km^{2})
  - Water: 0.01 sq mi (0.026 km^{2})
- Elevation: 2,467 ft (752 m)

Population (2020)
  - Total: 22
  - Density: 0.61/sq mi (0.24/km^{2})
- Area code: 701

Gilstrap Township is a township in Adams County, North Dakota, United States. As of the 2010 census, its population was 20.

Gilstrap Township has one unincorporated community, Petrel.
