= Hettinger (surname) =

Hettinger is a surname. Notable people with the surname include:

- Catherine Hettinger, American engineer and toy inventor
- Edward Gerard Hettinger (1902-1996), American Catholic bishop
- Franz Hettinger (1819–1890), German Catholic theologian
- Steve Hettinger, former mayor of Huntsville, Alabama
