= Chandler Township, Adams County, North Dakota =

Township in North Dakota, United States

Chandler Township, North Dakota
- Township
- Township of Chandler
- Coordinates: 46°08′25″N 102°25′32″W
- Country: United States
- State: North Dakota
- County: Adams

Area
  - Total: 36.01 sq mi (93.3 km^{2})
  - Land: 35.99 sq mi (93.2 km^{2})
  - Water: 0.02 sq mi (0.052 km^{2})
- Elevation: 2,497 ft (761 m)

Population (2020)
  - Total: 14
  - Density: 0.39/sq mi (0.15/km^{2})
- Area code: 701
- GNIS feature ID: 1037218

Chandler Township is a township in Adams County, North Dakota, United States. As of the 2010 census, its population was 13.
