= Holden Township, Adams County, North Dakota =

Former township in Adams County, North Dakota

Coordinates: 45°59′19″N 102°48′31″W

Holden Township is a defunct civil township in Adams County, North Dakota, USA. The 1990 census recorded a population of 44.

The township dissolved after the 1990 Census, and is now designated by the United States Census Bureau as Holden Unorganized Territory. The 2000 census population of the area was 32.
