= Spring Butte Township, Adams County, North Dakota =

Township of Adams County, North Dakota

Coordinates: 46°04′31″N 102°11′8″W

Spring Butte Township is a defunct civil township in Adams County, North Dakota, United States. The 1960 census recorded a population of 84.

The township dissolved prior to the 1980 Census, when it was combined with Cedar Butte, Dakota, Jordan, and Kansas City Townships to form the Census-designated East Adams Unorganized Territory. As of the 1990 Census, the combined area had a population of 146.

Map showing the location of Spring Butte Township in Adams County
