= Duck Creek Township, Adams County, North Dakota =

Township in Adams County, North Dakota

Duck Creek Township, North Dakota
- Township
- Township of Duck Creek
- Coordinates: 46°04′35″N 102°33′37″W
- Country: United States
- State: North Dakota
- County: Adams

Area
  - Total: 35.93 sq mi (93.1 km^{2})
  - Land: 35.93 sq mi (93.1 km^{2})
  - Water: 0 sq mi (0 km^{2})
- Elevation: 2,700 ft (823 m)

Population (2020)
  - Total: 20
  - Density: 0.56/sq mi (0.21/km^{2})
- Area code: 701
- GNIS feature ID: 1037208

Duck Creek Township is a township in Adams County, North Dakota, United States. As of the 2010 census, its population was 24.
