= Northgate Border Crossing =

Border crossing between Canada and the United States

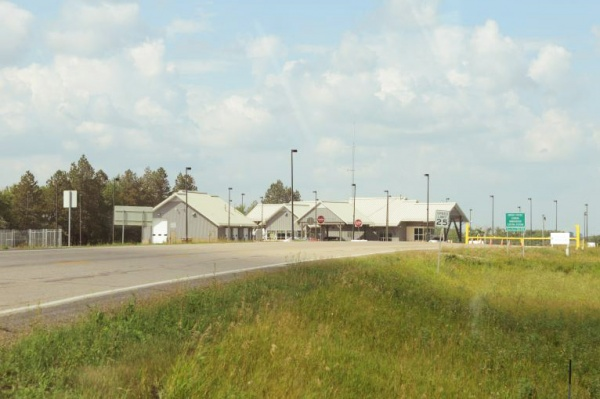
- U.S. Border Inspection Station at Northgate, North Dakota

Location
- Country: United States; Canada
- Location: ND 8 / Highway 9; U.S. Port: 10921 Hwy 8, Flaxton, North Dakota 58737; Canadian Port: Saskatchewan Highway 9 (Saskota Flyway), North Portal, Saskatchewan S0C 1W0
- Coordinates: 49°00′00″N 102°16′31″W

Details
- Opened: 1907

Website
- US Canadian

The Northgate Border Crossing connects the cities of Bowbells, North Dakota and Alameda, Saskatchewan on the Canada–U.S. border. North Dakota Highway 8 on the American side joins Saskatchewan Highway 9 on the Canadian side.

== Canadian side ==
Northgate Border Crossing in Saskatchewan

The customs office opened in 1907 at Boscurvis about 25 kilometres (16 mi) north of the border. The office operated under the administrative oversight of the Port of North Portal. A replacement facility, called Boundary Line, was constructed at the border in 1913. That year, the Grand Trunk Pacific Railway had built southward to connect with the Great Northern Railway building northward. In 1916–17, the office name changed to Northgate. During Prohibition in Saskatchewan, the smuggling of liquor northward through Northgate could turn violent.

The customs building was replaced in 1964. The former building was razed in 2014/15.

In 2020, the hours changed from being 8 am to 9 pm (summer) and 9 am to 10 pm (winter) to 8 am to 4 pm (summer) and mirroring the US winter hours. The port changed back to its regular hours late in 2021.

In January 2025, following an announcement by CBSA regarding hour changes at ports of entry across Canada, Northgate changed its hours of operation to 9 am to 5 pm (winter) and 8 am to 4 pm (summer) to mirror the hours of operation on the US side.

== U.S. side ==
The early border patrol history is unclear, but assumedly the U.S. mirrored the establishment of a permanent post at least by the 1910s.

The U.S. upgraded its border station on Highway 8 in 2004.

== Highway realignment and rail upgrade ==
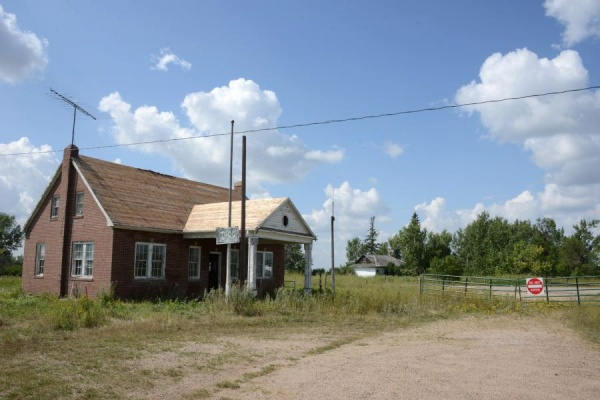
Former Canadian border station, Northgate

In 1962, the building of Highway 8 realigned the road to 0.5 miles (0.8 km) west of the previous crossing. After being idle for years, the Canadian National Railway upgraded its tracks at this crossing to support rail traffic from the Bakken oil field.

== See also ==
- List of Canada–United States border crossings
