= Reeder, North Dakota =

Reeder
- City
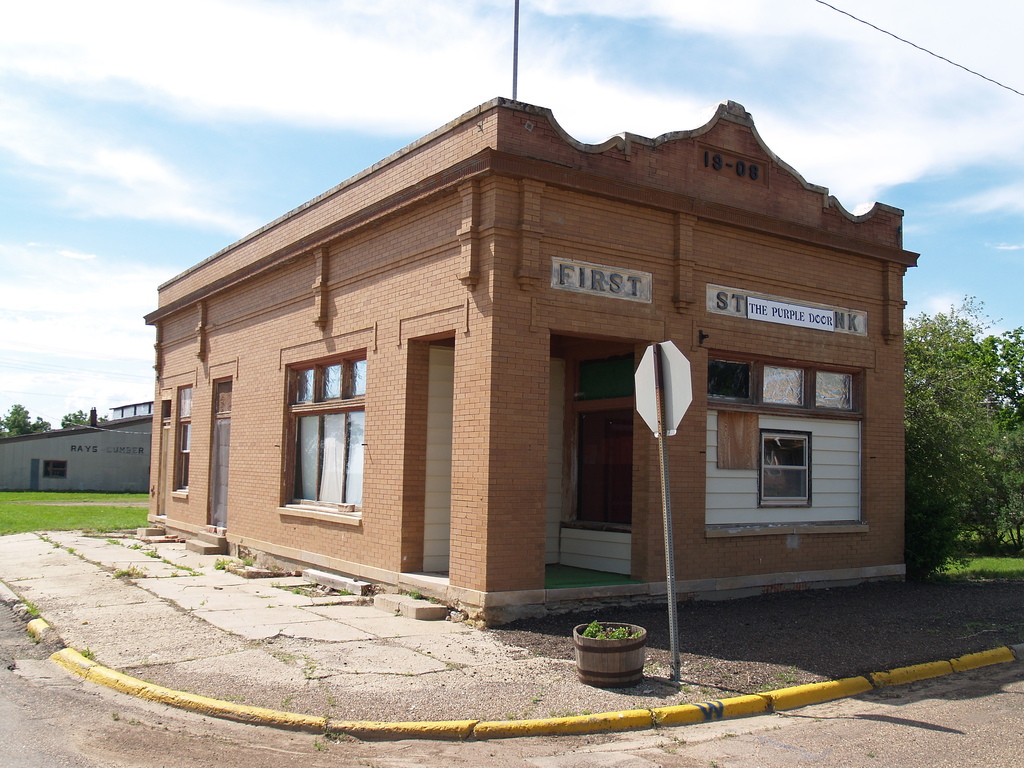
- An old bank in Reeder

- Location of Reeder, North Dakota
- Coordinates: 46°06′21″N 102°56′32″W
- Country: United States
- State: North Dakota
- County: Adams
- Founded: 1908
- Incorporated: 1909

Area
  - Total: 0.69 sq mi (1.78 km^{2})
  - Land: 0.69 sq mi (1.78 km^{2})
  - Water: 0 sq mi (0.00 km^{2})
- Elevation: 2,812 ft (857 m)

Population (2020)
  - Total: 125
  - Estimate (2022): 120
  - Density: 182.1/sq mi (70.29/km^{2})
- Time zone: UTC-7 (Mountain (MST))
  - Summer (DST): UTC-6 (MDT)
- ZIP code: 58649
- Area code: 701
- FIPS code: 38-65900
- GNIS feature ID: 1036232

Reeder is a city in Adams County, North Dakota, United States. The population was 125 at the 2020 census.

Reeder was founded in 1907 along the Chicago, Milwaukee, St. Paul and Pacific Railroad and named after E. O. Reeder, the railroad's assistant chief engineer. Reeder is a stop along the old Yellowstone Trail, the first transcontinental automobile highway in the Northern United States.

A strain of wheat developed by the North Dakota Agriculture Experiment Station has been named after the town.

== History ==
In 1907, two brothers, Albert and Charles Leff, founded and operated a post office, among other enterprises, one and one-half miles east of the present town of Reeder. The Chicago, Milwaukee, St. Paul and Pacific Railroad later platted the current townsite and named it Reeder. The Leff post office was relocated to the new town March 13, 1908, and the name Leff was used until July 1, 1908.

A tornado struck the area in 1923, destroying farmhouses and causing several deaths.

== Geography ==
According to the United States Census Bureau, the city has a total area of 0.62 square miles (1.61 km^{2}), all land. The city is located along U.S. Highway 12 at its junction with North Dakota Highway 22.

== Demographics ==
Historical population
Census	Pop.	Note	%±
1910	198		—
1920	258		30.3%
1930	395		53.1%
1940	263		−33.4%
1950	339		28.9%
1960	321		−5.3%
1970	306		−4.7%
1980	355		16.0%
1990	252		−29.0%
2000	181		−28.2%
2010	162		−10.5%
2020	125		−22.8%
2022 (est.)	120		−4.0%
U.S. Decennial Census; 2020 Census

=== 2010 census ===
As of the census of 2010, there were 162 people, 90 households, and 42 families residing in the city. The population density was 261.3 inhabitants per square mile (100.9/km^{2}). There were 114 housing units at an average density of 183.9 per square mile (71.0/km^{2}). The racial makeup of the city was 95.7% White, 0.6% African American, 1.2% Native American, 0.6% from other races, and 1.9% from two or more races. Hispanic or Latino of any race were 1.2% of the population.

There were 90 households, of which 14.4% had children under the age of 18 living with them, 42.2% were married couples living together, 2.2% had a female householder with no husband present, 2.2% had a male householder with no wife present, and 53.3% were non-families. 47.8% of all households were made up of individuals, and 25.6% had someone living alone who was 65 years of age or older. The average household size was 1.80 and the average family size was 2.52.

The median age in the city was 56.5 years. 13.6% of residents were under the age of 18; 4.9% were between the ages of 18 and 24; 18.5% were from 25 to 44; 26.5% were from 45 to 64; and 36.4% were 65 years of age or older. The gender makeup of the city was 51.9% male and 48.1% female.

=== 2000 census ===
As of the census of 2000, there were 181 people, 100 households, and 53 families residing in the city. The population density was 294.4 inhabitants per square mile (113.7/km^{2}). There were 130 housing units at an average density of 211.5 per square mile (81.7/km^{2}). The racial makeup of the city was 97.79% White, 1.10% Native American, and 1.10% from two or more races.

There were 100 households, out of which 9.0% had children under the age of 18 living with them, 50.0% were married couples living together, 3.0% had a female householder with no husband present, and 47.0% were non-families. 39.0% of all households were made up of individuals, and 24.0% had someone living alone who was 65 years of age or older. The average household size was 1.81 and the average family size was 2.38.

In the city, the population included 11.0% under the age of 18, 3.9% from 18 to 24, 14.4% from 25 to 44, 32.0% from 45 to 64, and 38.7% who were 65 years of age or older. The median age was 60 years. For every 100 females, there were 103.4 males. For every 100 females age 18 and over, there were 96.3 males.

The median income for a household in the city was $22,679, and the median income for a family was $33,333. Males had a median income of $25,208 versus $18,750 for females. The per capita income for the city was $15,462. About 3.2% of families and 9.5% of the population were below the poverty line, including none of those under the age of eighteen and 12.5% of those 65 or over.
