= Whetstone Township, Adams County, North Dakota =

Coordinates: 46°15′02″N 102°52′33″W

Whetstone Township is a defunct civil township in Adams County, North Dakota, USA. The 2000 census recorded a population of 21.

The township dissolved in 2006, and was combined with another defunct township, Lemmon Township, to form the Census-designated West Adams Unorganized Territory.
