= North Lemmon Township, Adams County, North Dakota =

Coordinates: 45°57′47″N 102°09′21″W

North Lemmon Township was a civil township in Adams County, North Dakota, USA. The 1990 census recorded a population of 81. The population was an estimated at 66 people in 1999.

The township dissolved in 1999, and is now part of the Census-designated East Adams Unorganized Territory.
