= Harriet Patrick Gilstrap =

American educator (1870-1970+)

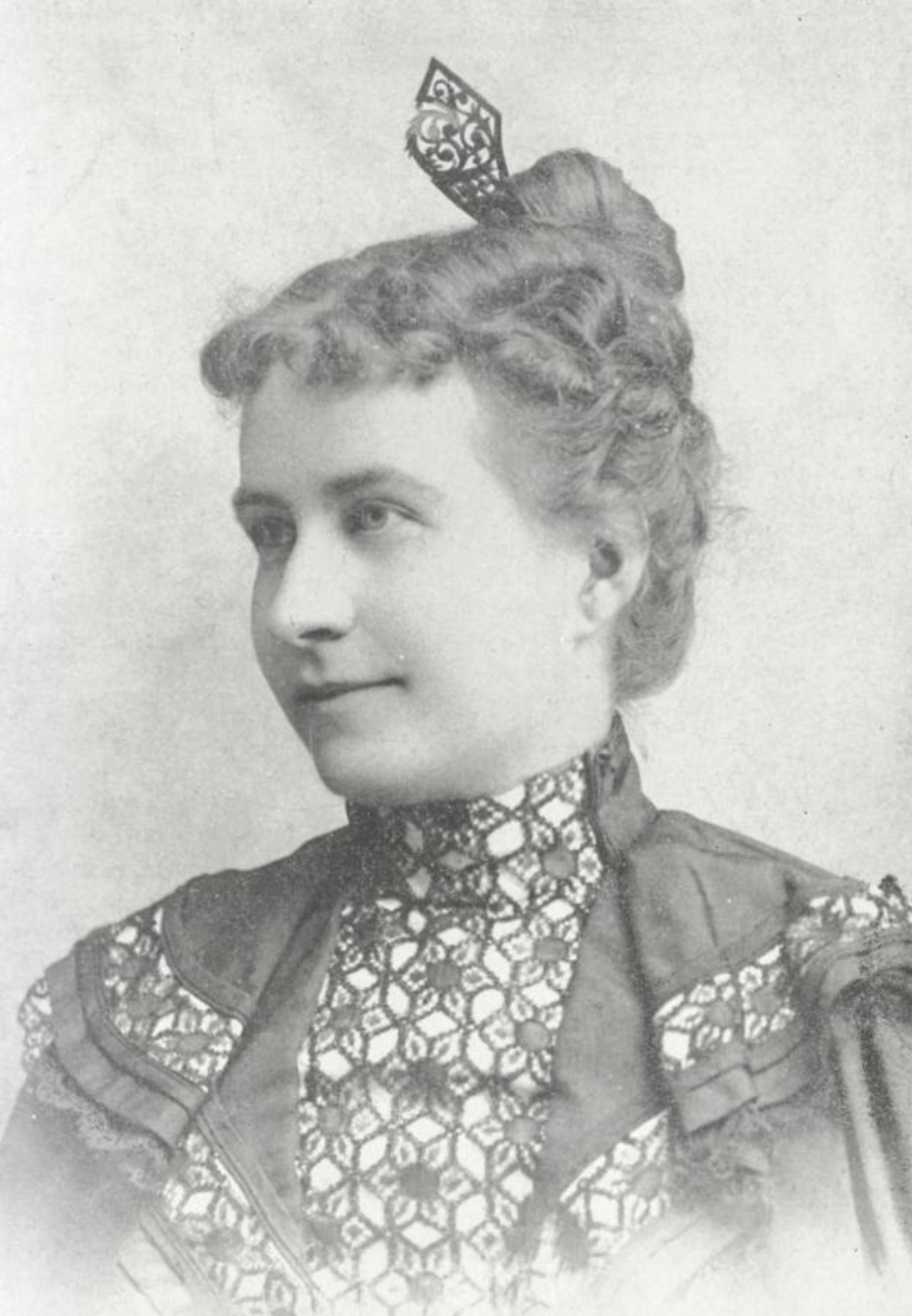
- Gilstrap c. 1893
- Born: February 1, 1870; Franklin County, Kansas, U.S.
- Died: After 1970
- Occupation: Educator
- Children: 3

Harriet Patrick Gilstrap (February 1, 1870 – after 1970) was an American educator who played a role in the development of Native American education in Oklahoma Territory. She taught at several agencies, including the Sac and Fox Agency, and participated in the Land Run of 1891, securing a homestead and later becoming a figure in Oklahoma's educational and civic communities.

== Early life ==
Harriet Patrick was born on February 1, 1870, on a farm near Centropolis, Kansas. Her family moved to Ottawa, when she was three years old. Gilstrap's father, Samuel Lee Patrick, was served in various capacities before becoming an Indian Agent in the Oklahoma Territory. He had previously lived on Sac and Fox lands in Illinois and Kansas and served as a captain during the American Civil War, where he sustained injuries and fought in battles such as Battle of Shiloh. Gilstrap graduated from high school in 1888 and attended Ottawa Baptist University for a year before her father was appointed as a U.S. Indian Agent by U.S. president Benjamin Harrison in 1889. The family initially settled in Oklahoma City before relocating to the Sac and Fox Agency, a facility established to oversee the Sac and Fox, Pottawatomie, Shawnee, Iowa, and Kickapoo tribes.

== Career ==
Gilstrap's first role at the Sac and Fox Agency was as a postal clerk at chief Moses Keokuk's store, which served as the government-authorized post office for the agency. She recalled interactions with members of the Dalton Gang, who frequented the store, and later began her teaching career at the Shawnee School, where she taught all grades. Her time at Shawnee was marked by challenging living and working conditions, including persistent bed bug infestations and limited access to sanitary water, which was hauled in barrels. Gilstrap devised her own methods to address these issues, such as treating her mattress and walls and attempting to encourage others to do the same.

In 1891, Gilstrap participated in the land run on the Sac and Fox reservation. Her father held her horse to prevent any appearance of favoritism due to his position as an Indian Agent. Despite this, she successfully secured a 160-acre homestead claim, outpacing a young man vying for the same plot. She built a one-room cabin and fenced the property, but her initial agricultural ventures proved unsuccessful; cattle succumbed to illness, and hogs to cholera. She ultimately sold the homestead for $3,000 and returned to teaching.

Gilstrap continued her teaching career at the Haskell Institute before becoming principal at the Quapaw Indian Agency. She then returned to the Sac and Fox Agency, where her brother, Lee Patrick, had assumed the role of agent. Gilstrap's teaching included instruction for students like Jim Thorpe, who would go on to fame as an athlete, and Ernest Spybuck, who later became known for his art depicting Native American life. Her experiences with students ranged from mentoring Spybuck, whose interests lay in drawing, to managing disciplinary issues with Thorpe, whom she described as incorrigible. During this period, she also taught Thorpe's twin brother, Charley, who died of typhoid while in Gilstrap's care.

== Personal life ==
In 1899, Gilstrap married Harry B. Gilstrap, editor of the Chandler News and secretary of the Oklahoma Press Association, in a ceremony held in Illinois. Harry had established a newspaper in Chandler and later served as the town's postmaster for twelve years. The couple lived in Chandler, Oklahoma, where Harry's career and involvement with the Oklahoma Press Association were well established. When the United States entered World War I in 1917, Harry, a National Guard member, enlisted, ultimately rising to the rank of major. Gilstrap and Harry had three sons, Lee, Sam, and Harry Jr., all of whom would later serve as military officers.

Their eldest son, Lee, enlisted in World War I at seventeen and received a Distinguished Service Cross for his actions in combat, which included capturing prisoners under enemy fire. He later served in World War II, achieving the rank of lieutenant colonel. Their second son, Harry Jr., served in the Air Force in Europe during World War II, eventually working as a business editor. The youngest son, Sam, served with the War Intelligence Service and worked for U.S. embassies worldwide, including in Cairo, Frankfurt, and Seoul, where he became Deputy Chief of Mission.

After the war, the family moved to Washington, D.C., where Harry worked as secretary to congressman Manuel Herrick. Later, Harry served with the United States Department of Veterans Affairs, which brought the family back to Oklahoma. Gilstrap was involved in her local Christian Church community and was honored as "Deaconess for Life." She attended various churches throughout her life, including a Catholic Church and an Episcopal Church during her time teaching at Haskell Institute.

Gilstrap remained active into her later years, witnessing Oklahoma's growth from its territorial days to statehood. She continued to live in Oklahoma City and was known for her service, historical contributions, and active role in the church until her death sometime after 1970.
