= Maine Township, Adams County, North Dakota =

Township in Adams County, North Dakota

Maine Township, North Dakota
- Township
- Township of Maine
- Coordinates: 46°14′00″N 102°33′12″W
- Country: United States
- State: North Dakota
- County: Adams

Area
  - Total: 31.71 sq mi (82.1 km^{2})
  - Land: 31.71 sq mi (82.1 km^{2})
  - Water: 0 sq mi (0 km^{2})
- Elevation: 2,726 ft (831 m)

Population (2020)
  - Total: 2
  - Density: 0.063/sq mi (0.024/km^{2})
- Area code: 701
- GNIS feature ID: 1037246

Maine Township is a township in Adams County, North Dakota, United States. As of the 2010 census, its population was 22.
