= Hettinger, North Dakota =

- City
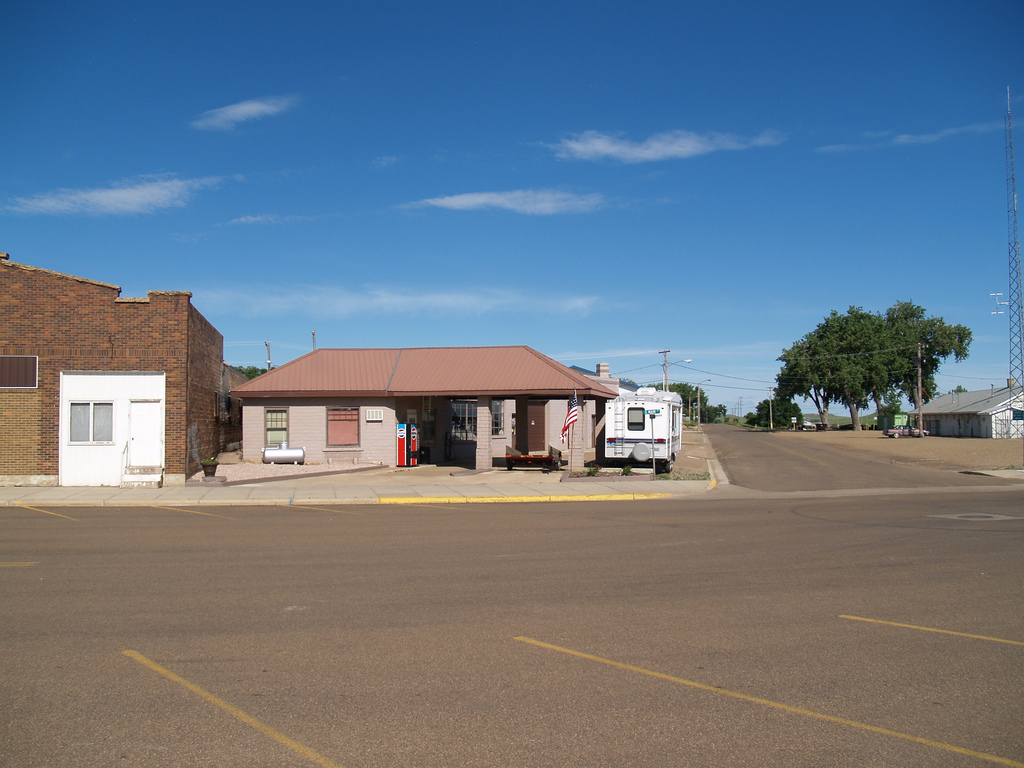
- Hettinger

- Location of Hettinger, North Dakota

- Location in the United States
- Coordinates: 46°00′06″N 102°37′24″W
- Country: United States
- State: North Dakota
- County: Adams
- Founded: 1907
- Incorporated: 1908

Government
  - Mayor: James Lindquist

Area
  - Total: 0.86 sq mi (2.22 km^{2})
  - Land: 0.83 sq mi (2.15 km^{2})
  - Water: 0.031 sq mi (0.08 km^{2})
- Elevation: 2,740 ft (835 m)

Population (2020)
  - Total: 1,074
  - Estimate (2022): 1,029
  - Density: 1,295.4/sq mi (500.16/km^{2})
- Time zone: UTC-7 (Mountain (MST))
  - Summer (DST): UTC-6 (MDT)
- ZIP code: 58639
- Area code: 701
- FIPS code: 38-37700
- GNIS feature ID: 1036091
- Highways: US 12, ND 8

Hettinger (/ˈhɛtɪŋɡər/ HET-ing-gər) is a city in and the county seat of Adams County, North Dakota, United States. The population was 1,074 at the 2020 census.

North Dakota State University operates a livestock research station near Hettinger, which often partners with South Dakota State University's Antelope Range and Livestock Research Station for sheep research.

== History ==
Hettinger was founded in 1907 along the Milwaukee Road's transcontinental rail line known as the Pacific Extension. The city and its surrounding township were named by popular demand in recognition of Hettinger County, from which Adams County was created in 1907.

In 1923 a tornado struck ten miles east of Hettinger, destroying a farmstead and killing two people.

== Geography ==
According to the United States Census Bureau, the city has a total area of 0.86 square miles (2.23 km^{2}), of which 0.85 square miles (2.20 km^{2}) is land and 0.01 square miles (0.03 km^{2}) is water.

=== Climate ===
According to the Köppen Climate Classification system, Hettinger has a semi-arid climate, abbreviated "BSk" on climate maps.

== Demographics ==
Historical population
Census	Pop.	Note	%±
1910	766		—
1920	817		6.7%
1930	1,292		58.1%
1940	1,138		−11.9%
1950	1,762		54.8%
1960	1,769		0.4%
1970	1,655		−6.4%
1980	1,739		5.1%
1990	1,574		−9.5%
2000	1,307		−17.0%
2010	1,226		−6.2%
2020	1,074		−12.4%
2022 (est.)	1,029		−4.2%
U.S. Decennial Census; 2020 Census

=== 2010 census ===
As of the census of 2010, there were 1,226 people, 587 households, and 316 families living in the city. The population density was 1,442.4 inhabitants per square mile (556.9/km^{2}). There were 704 housing units at an average density of 828.2 per square mile (319.8/km^{2}). The racial makeup of the city was 97.4% White, 0.2% African American, 0.7% Native American, 0.7% Asian, and 1.1% from two or more races. Hispanic or Latino people of any race were 0.9% of the population.

There were 587 households, of which 22.8% had children under the age of 18 living with them, 43.6% were married couples living together, 6.5% had a female householder with no husband present, 3.7% had a male householder with no wife present, and 46.2% were non-families. 42.9% of all households were made up of individuals, and 20.6% had someone living alone who was 65 years of age or older. The average household size was 2.00 and the average family size was 2.70.

The median age in the city was 48 years. 19.5% of residents were under the age of 18; 6.4% were between the ages of 18 and 24; 19.6% were from 25 to 44; 29.3% were from 45 to 64; and 25.2% were 65 years of age or older. The gender makeup of the city was 43.2% male and 56.8% female.

=== 2000 census ===
As of the census of 2000, there were 1,307 people, 584 households, and 345 families living in the city. The population density was 1,556.6 inhabitants per square mile (601.0/km^{2}). There were 720 housing units at an average density of 857.5 per square mile (331.1/km^{2}). The racial makeup of the city was 98.78% White, 0.15% African American, 0.38% Native American, 0.15% Asian, 0.08% Pacific Islander, 0.23% from other races, and 0.23% from two or more races. Hispanic or Latino people of any race were 0.38% of the population.

There were 584 households, out of which 25.7% had children under the age of 18 living with them, 47.8% were married couples living together, 8.6% had a female householder with no husband present, and 40.8% were non-families. 38.0% of all households were made up of individuals, and 22.6% had someone living alone who was 65 years of age or older. The average household size was 2.10 and the average family size was 2.76.

In the city, the population was spread out, with 21.7% under the age of 18, 4.8% from 18 to 24, 21.9% from 25 to 44, 23.2% from 45 to 64, and 28.5% who were 65 years of age or older. The median age was 46 years. For every 100 females, there were 80.0 males. For every 100 females age 18 and over, there were 78.1 males.

The median income for a household in the city was $27,689, and the median income for a family was $32,917. Males had a median income of $26,172 versus $19,674 for females. The per capita income for the city was $21,148. About 5.4% of families and 8.1% of the population were below the poverty line, including 8.6% of those under age 18 and 13.7% of those age 65 or over.

== Education ==
- Hettinger Public Elementary
- Hettinger High School

== Media ==
Radio stations

KNDC and KZRN are the two local stations in town.

== Infrastructure ==
=== Transportation ===
==== Streets and roads ====
Hettinger is served by one major highway—U.S. Route 12, one of the major east-west United States Numbered Highways. In total, US 12 runs for almost 2,500 miles (4,000 km), from the state of Michigan to the state of Washington. On a regional level, US 12 connects Hettinger to White Butte, South Dakota to the southeast, and to Bucyrus, North Dakota to the northwest. US 12 is known as Adams Avenue within downtown Hettinger.

The city is also served by North Dakota Highway 8 (ND 8), a north-south rural state highway. ND 8 enters North Dakota at the northern terminus of South Dakota Highway 75 (SD 75), four miles (6.4 km) south of Hettinger. This segment of ND 8 from the state line to the west side of downtown Hettinger is also known as 1st Street South. ND 8 then intersects with US 12, where it turns east onto US 12 and runs concurrently for 8.1 miles (13.0 km) before branching off again and turning northbound. The combination of US 12/ND 8 is also known as 1st Street East, after it exits the eastern border of downtown Hettinger.

==== Rail ====
East of 1st Street South, a double-track BNSF Railway freight-only mainline runs south of downtown Hettinger for approximately 1.88 miles (3.02 km), generally in a northwest to southeasterly direction. This length of double-track would permit two trains to pass each other when moving in opposite directions on each track, or for a faster or higher priority train to overtake a slower or lower priority train when moving in the same direction. Beyond this area of double-track, the mainline returns to a single-track right-of-way both to the east and west of Hettinger. Adjacent to the downtown area, three additional siding tracks also exist, one on the north side of the mainline for the parking of switching locomotives, and two on the south side of the mainline for loading and railcar storage at the nearby grain elevators.

There is no passenger rail service in the Hettinger region, the nearest Amtrak station is a drive of nearly 200 miles to the Empire Builder route and the stops at either Williston or Stanley, North Dakota.

==== Air ====
Located one nautical mile (1.85 km) northwest of the central business district is the Hettinger Regional Airport. This general aviation airport has no scheduled airline service. The nearest airport with airline service is the Dickinson Theodore Roosevelt Regional Airport located 63.1 miles (101.55 km) away, and just south of Dickinson, North Dakota. The only destination for the United Airlines flights departing Dickinson is Denver, Colorado. However, 153 miles (246.23 km) northeast of Hettinger is the Bismarck Municipal Airport, which has a much larger variety of both airlines and destinations.

=== Health care ===
Many health care facilities exist in the greater Hettinger area and the surrounding region under the West River Health Services umbrella. Serving more than 20,000 residents in southwest North Dakota, northwest South Dakota, and southeastern Montana, West River Health Services provides an array of services which include:

- West River Health Services Hospital
  - provides 24-hour emergency (ER) and Level IV trauma care
  - 19 Private Rooms/Acute/Swingbed/Out-Patient
  - Three Beds for Intensive Care Unit (ICU)
  - Three Beds for Birthing Unit (OB)
  - Two Patient Rooms with Visual/Monitoring
- West River Eye Center
- West River Rehabilitation & Wellness Center
- Assisted Living Facility (Western Horizons Assisted Living)
- 45 bed Skilled Nursing Facility (Western Horizons Care Center)
- Visiting Nurse
- Ambulance Service
- Six Community Clinics
- Behavioral Health - Individual, Couple and Family Counseling/Therapy Service

== Religion ==
The -Churches- section of the Hettinger Chamber of Commerce website lists eight churches in the area:

- Abundant Life Assembly of God Church
- Connection Church
- Grace Evangelical Free Church
- Hettinger Baptist Church
- Hettinger Lutheran Church
- Hettinger United Methodist Church
- Holy Trinity (Roman Catholic)
- Our Savior’s Lutheran Church

== Notable people ==
- Rick Berg, U.S. representative from North Dakota
- Patrick Daniel Norton, U.S. representative from North Dakota
- Steve Tomac, North Dakota state legislator
- Korliss Uecker, soprano
