= Clermont Township, Adams County, North Dakota =

Township in North Dakota, United States

Clermont Township, North Dakota
- Township
- Township of Clermont
- Coordinates: 46°00′45″N 102°22′28″W
- Country: United States
- State: North Dakota
- County: Adams

Area
  - Total: 35.93 sq mi (93.1 km^{2})
  - Land: 35.89 sq mi (93.0 km^{2})
  - Water: 0.04 sq mi (0.10 km^{2})
- Elevation: 2,707 ft (825 m)

Population (2020)
  - Total: 50
  - Density: 1.4/sq mi (0.54/km^{2})
- Area code: 701
- GNIS feature ID: 1037235

Clermont Township is a township in Adams County, North Dakota, United States. As of the 2010 census, its population was 35.

Clermont Township surrounds one city, Haynes.
