= Maine Township, Grundy County, Illinois =

Maine Township
- Township
- Location in Grundy County

- Grundy County's location in Illinois
- Coordinates: 41°14′40″N 88°19′54″W
- Country: United States
- State: Illinois
- County: Grundy
- Established: March 18, 1898

Area
  - Total: 18.07 sq mi (46.8 km^{2})
  - Land: 17.89 sq mi (46.3 km^{2})
  - Water: 0.18 sq mi (0.47 km^{2}) 0.99%
- Elevation: 560 ft (170 m)

Population (2020)
  - Total: 293
  - Density: 16.4/sq mi (6.32/km^{2})
- Time zone: UTC-6 (CST)
  - Summer (DST): UTC-5 (CDT)
- ZIP codes: 60416, 60424, 60444
- FIPS code: 17-063-46175

Maine Township is one of seventeen townships in Grundy County, Illinois, USA. As of the 2020 census, its population was 293 and it contained 125 housing units.

== Geography ==
According to the 2021 census gazetteer files, Maine Township has a total area of 18.07 square miles (46.80 km^{2}), of which 17.89 square miles (46.33 km^{2}) (or 99.01%) is land and 0.18 square miles (0.47 km^{2}) (or 0.99%) is water.

=== Cities, towns, villages ===
- Coal City (southwest edge)

=== Unincorporated towns ===
- Gorman at 41.261143°N 88.341731°W
- Harrisonville at 41.287254°N 88.304786°W

(This list is based on USGS data and may include former settlements.)

=== Major highways ===
- Interstate 55

=== Airports and landing strips ===
- Matteson RLA Airport

== Demographics ==
As of the 2020 census there were 293 people, 82 households, and 68 families residing in the township. The population density was 16.22 inhabitants per square mile (6.26/km^{2}). There were 125 housing units at an average density of 6.92 per square mile (2.67/km^{2}). The racial makeup of the township was 93.86% White, 1.02% African American, 0.00% Native American, 0.68% Asian, 0.00% Pacific Islander, 0.00% from other races, and 4.44% from two or more races. Hispanic or Latino of any race were 5.46% of the population.

There were 82 households, out of which 8.50% had children under the age of 18 living with them, 82.93% were married couples living together, 0.00% had a female householder with no spouse present, and 17.07% were non-families. 17.10% of all households were made up of individuals, and 0.00% had someone living alone who was 65 years of age or older. The average household size was 2.54 and the average family size was 2.85.

The township's age distribution consisted of 8.7% under the age of 18, 16.3% from 18 to 24, 9.6% from 25 to 44, 40.9% from 45 to 64, and 24.5% who were 65 years of age or older. The median age was 53.5 years. For every 100 females, there were 123.7 males. For every 100 females age 18 and over, there were 123.5 males.

The median income for a household in the township was $136,818, and the median income for a family was $160,250. Males had a median income of $62,232 versus $33,594 for females. The per capita income for the township was $49,157. None of the population was below the poverty line.

Historical population
Census	Pop.	Note	%±
2000	244		—
2010	330		35.2%
2020	293		−11.2%
U.S. Decennial Census

== School districts ==
- Coal City Community Unit School District 1

== Political districts ==
- Illinois' 11th congressional district
- State House District 75
- State Senate District 38
