= Adams County, North Dakota =

County in North Dakota, United States

- County
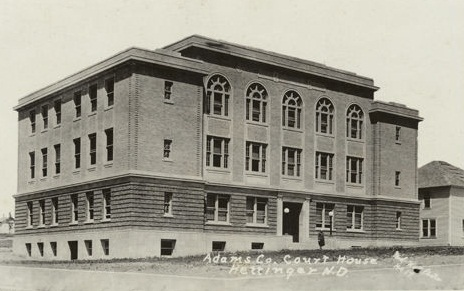
- Postcard. Adams County Courthouse in Hettinger

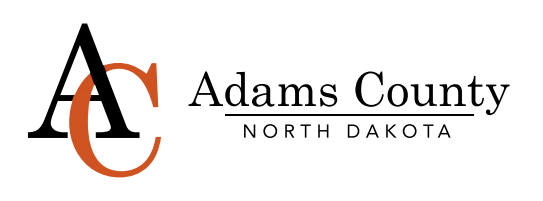
- Logo

- Location within the U.S. state of North Dakota
- Coordinates: 46.096815°N 102.533198°W
- Country: United States
- State: North Dakota
- Founded: April 17, 1907 (created); April 24, 1907 (organized)
- Seat: Hettinger
- Largest city: Hettinger

Area
  - Total: 988.665 sq mi (2,560.63 km^{2})
  - Land: 987.547 sq mi (2,557.73 km^{2})
  - Water: 1.118 sq mi (2.90 km^{2}) 0.11%

Population (2020)
  - Total: 2,200
  - Estimate (2025): 2,275 ▲
  - Density: 2.168/sq mi (0.837/km^{2})
- Time zone: UTC−7 (Mountain)
  - Summer (DST): UTC−6 (MDT)
- Area code: 701
- Congressional district: At-large
- Website: adamscountynd.com

Adams County is a county in the U.S. state of North Dakota. As of the 2020 census, the population was 2,200, and was estimated to be 2,275 in 2025. The county seat is Hettinger.

== History ==
The county was created on April 17, 1907, and organized a week later. It was named for John Quincy Adams (1848–1919), a railroad official for the Milwaukee Road Railroad and distant relative of sixth U.S. President John Quincy Adams (1767–1848). In 1923, Adams County was the site of one of the deadliest tornadoes in North Dakota's recorded history. The "Adams County Twister' killed eight people and injured 20.

== Geography ==
Adams County lies on the south line of North Dakota. Its south boundary line abuts the north boundary line of the state of South Dakota. Its terrain consists of semi-arid low rolling hills. Its terrain generally slopes eastward, and its highest point is on its upper west boundary line, at 3,002 ft (915 m) ASL.

According to the United States Census Bureau, the county has a total area of 988.665 square miles (2,560.63 km^{2}), of which 987.547 square miles (2,557.73 km^{2}) is land and 1.118 square miles (2.90 km^{2}) (0.11%) is water. It is the 40th largest county in North Dakota by total area.

=== Adjacent counties ===
- Hettinger County – north
- Grant County – northeast
- Sioux County – east
- Corson County, South Dakota – southeast
- Perkins County, South Dakota – south
- Harding County, South Dakota – southwest
- Bowman County – west
- Slope County – northwest

=== Major highways ===
- U.S. Highway 12
- North Dakota Highway 8
- North Dakota Highway 22

=== Protected areas ===
- North Lemmon Lake State Game Management Area

=== Lakes ===
- North Lemmon Lake
- Mirror Lake

== Demographics ==
Historical population
Census	Pop.	Note	%±
1910	5,407		—
1920	5,593		3.4%
1930	6,343		13.4%
1940	4,664		−26.5%
1950	4,910		5.3%
1960	4,449		−9.4%
1970	3,832		−13.9%
1980	3,584		−6.5%
1990	3,174		−11.4%
2000	2,593		−18.3%
2010	2,343		−9.6%
2020	2,200		−6.1%
2025 (est.)	2,275	▲	3.4%
U.S. Decennial Census; 1790–1960 1900–1990; 1990–2000 2010–2020

As of the fourth quarter of 2024, the median home value in Adams County was $114,750. As of the 2023 American Community Survey, there are 1,019 estimated households in Adams County with an average of 2.06 persons per household. The county has a median household income of $55,417. Approximately 11.8% of the county's population lives at or below the poverty line. Adams County has an estimated 56.9% employment rate, with 20.8% of the population holding a bachelor's degree or higher and 92.4% holding a high school diploma.

The top five reported ancestries (people were allowed to report up to two ancestries, thus the figures will generally add to more than 100%) were English (93.9%), Spanish (4.0%), Indo-European (1.4%), Asian and Pacific Islander (0.0%), and Other (0.7%). The median age in the county was 50.0 years.

Adams County, North Dakota – racial and ethnic composition
Note: the US Census treats Hispanic/Latino as an ethnic category. This table excludes Latinos from the racial categories and assigns them to a separate category. Hispanics/Latinos may be of any race.

Race / ethnicity (NH = non-Hispanic)	Pop. 1980	Pop. 1990	Pop. 2000	Pop. 2010	Pop. 2020
White alone (NH)	3,559 (99.30%)	3,160 (99.56%)	2,550 (98.34%)	2,266 (96.71%)	2,028 (92.18%)
Black or African American alone (NH)	1 (0.03%)	3 (0.09%)	14 (0.54%)	8 (0.34%)	12 (0.55%)
Native American or Alaska Native alone (NH)	8 (0.22%)	10 (0.32%)	8 (0.31%)	15 (0.64%)	14 (0.64%)
Asian alone (NH)	7 (0.20%)	0 (0.00%)	4 (0.15%)	9 (0.38%)	39 (1.77%)
Pacific Islander alone (NH)	—	—	1 (0.04%)	2 (0.09%)	1 (0.05%)
Other race alone (NH)	0 (0.00%)	0 (0.00%)	0 (0.00%)	0 (0.00%)	0 (0.00%)
Mixed race or multiracial (NH)	—	—	9 (0.35%)	23 (0.98%)	70 (3.18%)
Hispanic or Latino (any race)	9 (0.25%)	1 (0.03%)	7 (0.27%)	20 (0.85%)	36 (1.64%)
Total	3,584 (100.00%)	3,174 (100.00%)	2,593 (100.00%)	2,343 (100.00%)	2,200 (100.00%)

=== 2024 estimate ===
As of the 2024 estimate, there were 2,141 people and 1,019 households residing in the county. There were 1,362 housing units at an average density of 1.38 per square mile (0.5/km^{2}). The racial makeup of the county was 90.4% White (88.8% NH White), 1.7% African American, 1.1% Native American, 3.2% Asian, 0.1% Pacific Islander, _% from some other races and 3.5% from two or more races. Hispanic or Latino people of any race were 3.0% of the population.

=== 2020 census ===
As of the 2020 census, the county had a population of 2,200. There were 1,011 households and 599 families residing in the county. The population density was 2.2 inhabitants per square mile (0.8/km^{2}). There were 1,364 housing units at an average density of 1.38 per square mile (0.5/km^{2}).

Of the residents, 19.7% were under the age of 18 and 29.4% were 65 years of age or older; the median age was 50.9 years. For every 100 females there were 96.4 males, and for every 100 females age 18 and over there were 97.4 males.

The racial makeup of the county was 92.7% White, 0.6% African American, 0.6% Native American, 1.8% Asian, 0.5% from some other race, and 3.8% from two or more races. Hispanic or Latino residents of any race comprised 1.6% of the population.

There were 1,011 households in the county, of which 21.3% had children under the age of 18 living with them and 24.5% had a female householder with no spouse or partner present. About 36.5% of all households were made up of individuals and 18.9% had someone living alone who was 65 years of age or older.

There were 1,364 housing units, of which 25.9% were vacant. Among occupied housing units, 76.4% were owner-occupied and 23.6% were renter-occupied. The homeowner vacancy rate was 3.2% and the rental vacancy rate was 24.4%.

=== 2010 census ===
As of the 2010 census, there were 2,343 people, 1,098 households, and 658 families in the county. The population density was 2.4 inhabitants per square mile (0.9/km^{2}). There were 1,377 housing units at an average density of 1.39 per square mile (0.5/km^{2}). The racial makeup of the county was 97.27% White, 0.34% African American, 0.68% Native American, 0.38% Asian, 0.09% Pacific Islander, 0.17% from some other races and 1.07% from two or more races. Hispanic or Latino people of any race were 0.85% of the population.

In terms of ancestry, 51.8% were German, 29.9% were Norwegian, 8.0% were Irish, 7.4% were Swedish, 7.1% were English, 5.4% were Russian, and 4.6% were American.

There were 1,098 households, 22.3% had children under the age of 18 living with them, 51.5% were married couples living together, 4.8% had a female householder with no husband present, 40.1% were non-families, and 36.6% of all households were made up of individuals. The average household size was 2.09 and the average family size was 2.69. The median age was 49.5 years.

The median income for a household in the county was $35,966 and the median income for a family was $50,227. Males had a median income of $31,290 versus $25,145 for females. The per capita income for the county was $20,118. About 5.7% of families and 10.6% of the population were below the poverty line, including 7.1% of those under age 18 and 14.2% of those age 65 or over.

== Communities ==
Detailed map of Adams County

=== Cities ===
- Bucyrus
- Haynes
- Hettinger (county seat)
- Reeder

=== Unincorporated communities ===
- North Lemmon

=== Ghost towns ===
- Petrel

=== Townships ===
- Beisigl
- Bucyrus
- Cedar
- Chandler
- Clermont
- Darling Springs
- Duck Creek
- Gilstrap
- Hettinger
- Lightning Creek
- Maine
- Orange
- Reeder
- Scott
- South Fork
- Taylor Butte
- Wolf Butte

=== Unorganized territories ===
- Central Adams
- East Adams
- Holden
- West Adams

=== Defunct townships ===
- Argonne
- Cedar Butte
- Dakota
- Holden
- Holt
- Jordan
- Kansas City
- Lemmon
- North Lemmon
- Spring Butte
- Whetstone

== Politics ==
Adams County voters have been reliably Republican for decades. In only two national elections since 1936 has the county selected the Democratic Party candidate.

United States presidential election results for Adams County, North Dakota
Year	Republican		Democratic		Third party(ies)	
Year	No.	%	No.	%	No.	%
1908	577	70.45%	201	24.54%	41	5.01%
1912	205	24.15%	249	29.33%	395	46.53%
1916	469	43.63%	532	49.49%	74	6.88%
1920	1,377	77.88%	347	19.63%	44	2.49%
1924	776	40.25%	106	5.50%	1,046	54.25%
1928	1,590	70.67%	644	28.62%	16	0.71%
1932	915	35.11%	1,514	58.10%	177	6.79%
1936	746	31.03%	1,321	54.95%	337	14.02%
1940	1,231	58.76%	837	39.95%	27	1.29%
1944	966	58.62%	668	40.53%	14	0.85%
1948	908	51.01%	753	42.30%	119	6.69%
1952	1,561	70.54%	633	28.60%	19	0.86%
1956	1,338	64.86%	723	35.05%	2	0.10%
1960	1,232	59.69%	832	40.31%	0	0.00%
1964	877	46.45%	1,010	53.50%	1	0.05%
1968	1,020	57.27%	641	35.99%	120	6.74%
1972	1,177	62.77%	665	35.47%	33	1.76%
1976	940	48.53%	959	49.51%	38	1.96%
1980	1,334	68.73%	470	24.21%	137	7.06%
1984	1,343	70.68%	530	27.89%	27	1.42%
1988	1,018	58.61%	708	40.76%	11	0.63%
1992	647	39.79%	469	28.84%	510	31.37%
1996	575	49.91%	366	31.77%	211	18.32%
2000	826	71.21%	286	24.66%	48	4.14%
2004	915	70.88%	353	27.34%	23	1.78%
2008	788	62.00%	435	34.23%	48	3.78%
2012	918	71.38%	328	25.51%	40	3.11%
2016	909	74.63%	216	17.73%	93	7.64%
2020	981	77.30%	258	20.33%	30	2.36%
2024	962	80.10%	215	17.90%	24	2.00%

== See also ==
- National Register of Historic Places listings in Adams County, North Dakota
