= Haynes, North Dakota =

- City
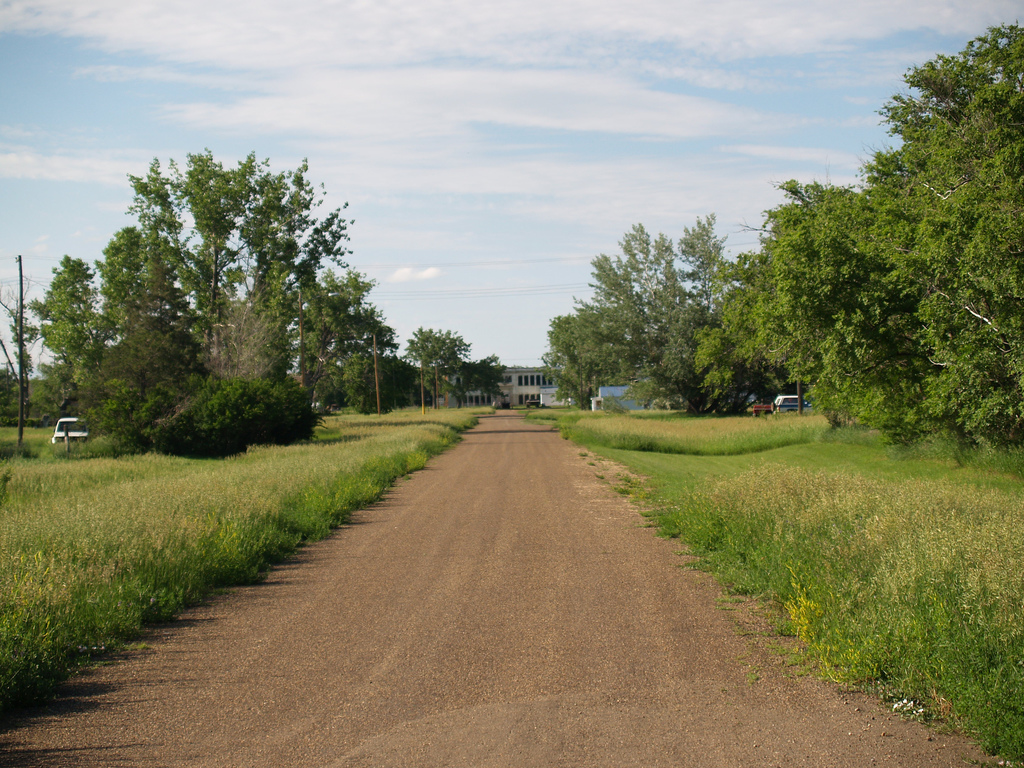
- Haynes, North Dakota

- Location of Haynes, North Dakota
- Coordinates: 45°58′26″N 102°28′16″W
- Country: United States
- State: North Dakota
- County: Adams
- Founded as Gadsden: 1906
- Founded as Haynes: 1907
- Named for: George B. Haynes

Area
  - Total: 0.14 sq mi (0.35 km^{2})
  - Land: 0.14 sq mi (0.35 km^{2})
  - Water: 0 sq mi (0.00 km^{2})
- Elevation: 2,543 ft (775 m)

Population (2020)
  - Total: 15
  - Estimate (2022): 15
  - Density: 111.0/sq mi (42.86/km^{2})
- Time zone: UTC-7 (Mountain (MST))
  - Summer (DST): UTC-6 (MDT)
- ZIP code: 58639
- Area code: 701
- FIPS code: 38-36540
- GNIS feature ID: 1036087

Haynes is a city in Adams County, North Dakota, United States. The population was 15 at the 2020 census.

Haynes was founded as Gadsden in 1906 along the Milwaukee Road's transcontinental rail line known as the Pacific Extension. The name was changed to Haynes in 1907 to honor George B. Haynes, president of the Milwaukee Road at the time.

== Geography ==
Haynes is located just north of the Grand River National Grassland.

According to the United States Census Bureau, the city has a total area of 0.14 square miles (0.36 km^{2}), all land.

== Demographics ==
Historical population
Census	Pop.	Note	%±
1920	113		—
1930	167		47.8%
1940	210		25.7%
1950	145		−31.0%
1960	111		−23.4%
1970	53		−52.3%
1980	58		9.4%
1990	37		−36.2%
2000	19		−48.6%
2010	23		21.1%
2020	15		−34.8%
2022 (est.)	15		0.0%
U.S. Decennial Census; 2020 Census

=== 2010 census ===
At the 2010 census, there were 23 people, 13 households and 6 families residing in the city. The population density was 164.3 inhabitants per square mile (63.4/km^{2}). There were 16 housing units at an average density of 114.3 per square mile (44.1/km^{2}). The racial makeup of the city was 78.3% White and 21.7% Native American.

There were 13 households, of which 7.7% had children under the age of 18 living with them, 46.2% were married couples living together, and 53.8% were non-families. 46.2% of all households were made up of individuals, and 7.7% had someone living alone who was 65 years of age or older. The average household size was 1.77 and the average family size was 2.50.

The median age in the city was 55.3 years. 13% of residents were under the age of 18; 4.2% were between the ages of 18 and 24; 13% were from 25 to 44; 30.3% were from 45 to 64; and 39.1% were 65 years of age or older. The sex makeup of the city was 52.2% male and 47.8% female.

=== 2000 census ===
At the 2000 census, there were 19 people, 10 households and 5 families residing in the city. The population density was 143.4 inhabitants per square mile (55.4/km^{2}). There were 15 housing units at an average density of 113.2 per square mile (43.7/km^{2}). The racial makeup of the city was 89.47% White, and 10.53% from two or more races.

There were 10 households, of which none had children under the age of 18 living with them, 50.0% were married couples living together, and 50.0% were non-families. 40.0% of all households were made up of individuals, and 20.0% had someone living alone who was 65 years of age or older. The average household size was 1.90 and the average family size was 2.60.

10.5% of the population were under the age of 18, 15.8% from 25 to 44, 47.4% from 45 to 64, and 26.3% who were 65 years of age or older. The median age was 60 years. For every 100 females, there were 90.0 males. For every 100 females age 18 and over, there were 88.9 males.

The median household income was $8,750 and the median family income for a family was $8,750. Males had a median income of $13,750 compared with $0 for females. The per capita income for the city was $6,633. Below the poverty line were 77.8% of people, 100.0% of families, none of those under 18 and 100.0% of those over 64.
