= Hettinger Township, Adams County, North Dakota =

Coordinates: 46°00′45″N 102°40′32″W

Hettinger Township
- Hettinger Township in Adams County

- Adams County in North Dakota
- Country: United States
- State: North Dakota
- County: Adams
- Seat: Hettinger

Area
  - Total: 35.10 sq mi (90.91 km^{2})
  - Land: 34.89 sq mi (90.36 km^{2})
  - Water: 0.21 sq mi (0.55 km^{2})
- Elevation: 2,684 ft (818 m)

Population (2020)
  - Total: 168
  - Density: 4.82/sq mi (1.86/km^{2})

Hettinger Township is a township in Adams County, North Dakota, United States. As of the 2020 census, its population was 168.

Hettinger, the county seat and the largest city in Adams County, is in Hettinger Township.

== History ==
Hettinger was named by American surveyor general E.A. Williams after his father-in-law, Mathias Hettinger.

== Demographics ==
Historical population
Census	Pop.	Note	%±
1910	98		—
1920	181		84.7%
1930	237		30.9%
1940	145		−38.8%
1950	154		6.2%
1960	158		2.6%
1970	168		6.3%
1980	192		14.3%
1990	218		13.5%
2000	198		−9.2%
2010	195		−1.5%
2020	168		−13.8%
U.S. Decennial Census

Hettinger's population was 237 in the 1930 Census (excluding the city of Hettinger), and that number fell to 145 by 1940. Its population as of 2010 was 195.

According to the 2010 census, the racial makeup of the township was 96.41% White, 2.05% Black, 0.51% Asian, 0.51% Hispanic of any race, and 1.03% multiracial.
