= Bucyrus, North Dakota =

- City
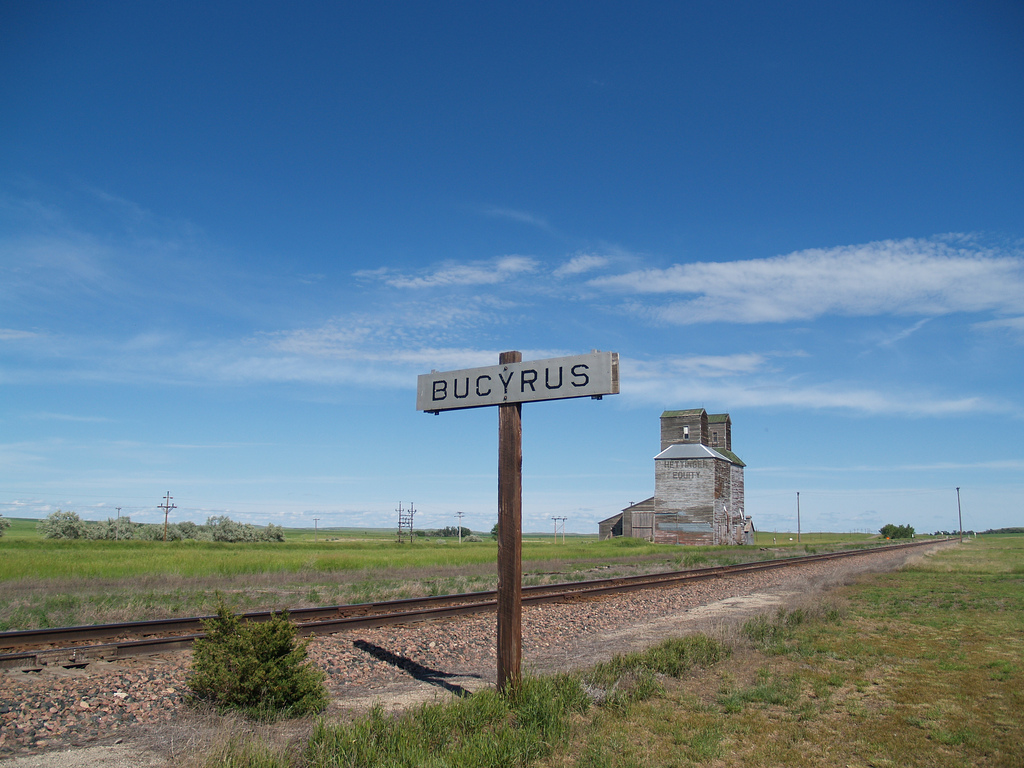
- A grain elevator just outside Bucyrus

- Location of Bucyrus, North Dakota
- Coordinates: 46°03′52″N 102°47′18″W
- Country: United States
- State: North Dakota
- County: Adams
- Founded: 1907

Government
  - Mayor: Cole Hunter

Area
  - Total: 0.35 sq mi (0.91 km^{2})
  - Land: 0.35 sq mi (0.91 km^{2})
  - Water: 0 sq mi (0.00 km^{2})
- Elevation: 2,782 ft (848 m)

Population (2020)
  - Total: 18
  - Estimate (2024): 15
  - Density: 51.4/sq mi (19.86/km^{2})
- Time zone: UTC–7 (Mountain (MST))
  - Summer (DST): UTC–6 (MDT)
- ZIP code: 58639
- Area code: 701
- FIPS code: 38-10300
- GNIS feature ID: 1035945

Bucyrus is a city, without paved roads, in Adams County, North Dakota, United States. The population was 18 at the 2020 census.

The city was founded in 1907 along the Milwaukee Road's transcontinental rail line known as the Pacific Extension. Before being named Bucyrus in 1908, the city was called first Wolf Butte and then Dolan, which was ultimately rejected due to similarity with Doland, South Dakota. The new name Bucyrus was taken from the Bucyrus Company steam shovels used to build the railroad grade within the city.

In 1922 a cyclone hit and destroyed the home of the Herbert and Ruth Spencer family in Bucyrus, killing three and injuring three. After the storm, the surviving family members could not find the baby, Shirley, 13 months old. A search party finally found baby Shirley the next day, sleeping soundly among bricks from the chimney in a wheat field half a mile from the home. For the rest of her life, Shirley Spencer was known as "the Cyclone Baby."

The town was struck by a wind-fueled wildfire on October 18, 2012. Much of the town was destroyed and 26 people were displaced.

== Geography ==
According to the United States Census Bureau, the city has a total area of 0.35 square miles (0.91 km^{2}), all land.

== Demographics ==
Historical population
Census	Pop.	Note	%±
1920	113		—
1930	124		9.7%
1940	117		−5.6%
1950	111		−5.1%
1960	60		−45.9%
1970	42		−30.0%
1980	32		−23.8%
1990	22		−31.2%
2000	26		18.2%
2010	27		3.8%
2020	18		−33.3%
2024 (est.)	15		−16.7%
U.S. Decennial Census; 2020 Census

=== 2010 census ===
As of the census of 2010, there were 27 people, 11 households, and 8 families residing in the city. The population density was 77.1 inhabitants per square mile (29.8/km^{2}). There were 17 housing units at an average density of 48.6 per square mile (18.8/km^{2}). The racial makeup of the city was 100.0% White.

There were 11 households, of which 27.3% had children under the age of 18 living with them, 63.6% were married couples living together, 9.1% had a female householder with no husband present, and 27.3% were non-families. 27.3% of all households were made up of individuals, and 9.1% had someone living alone who was 65 years of age or older. The average household size was 2.45 and the average family size was 3.00.

The median age in the city was 35.5 years. 29.6% of residents were under the age of 18; 3.7% were between the ages of 18 and 24; 22.2% were from 25 to 44; 25.9% were from 45 to 64; and 18.5% were 65 years of age or older. The gender makeup of the city was 48.1% male and 51.9% female.

=== 2000 census ===
As of the census of 2000, there were 26 people, 14 households, and 7 families residing in the city. The population density was 75.6 inhabitants per square mile (29.2/km^{2}). There were 16 housing units at an average density of 46.5 per square mile (18.0/km^{2}). The racial makeup of the city was 100.00% White.

There were 14 households, out of which 7.1% had children under the age of 18 living with them, 42.9% were married couples living together, 7.1% had a female householder with no husband present, and 42.9% were non-families. 28.6% of all households were made up of individuals, and 7.1% had someone living alone who was 65 years of age or older. The average household size was 1.86 and the average family size was 2.25.

In the city, the population was spread out, with 3.8% under the age of 18, 15.4% from 18 to 24, 19.2% from 25 to 44, 46.2% from 45 to 64, and 15.4% who were 65 years of age or older. The median age was 49 years. For every 100 females, there were 116.7 males. For every 100 females age 18 and over, there were 108.3 males.

The median income for a household in the city was $32,250, and the median income for a family was $32,000. Males had a median income of $27,500 versus $21,250 for females. The per capita income for the city was $16,539. None of the population and none of the families were below the poverty line.
