= Acme Township =

Acme Township may refer to the following places in the United States:

- Acme Township, Michigan
- Acme Township, North Dakota
