= Merrill Township =

Merrill Township may refer to the following places in the United States:

- Merrill Township, Michigan
- Merrill Township, Hettinger County, North Dakota

== See also ==
- Morrill Township (disambiguation)
