= Pretty Rock National Wildlife Refuge =

National Wildlife Refuge in North Dakota, United States

- IUCN category IV (habitat/species management area)
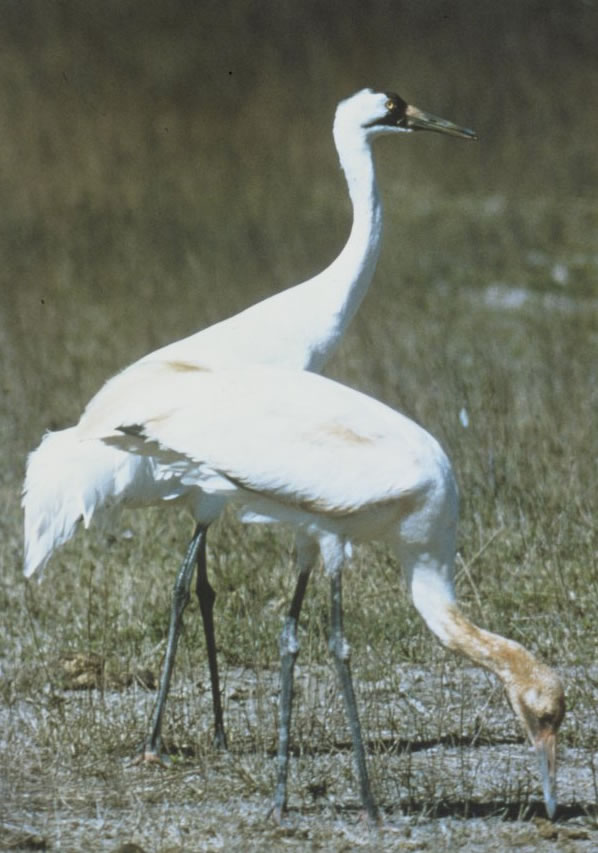
- Whooping cranes

- Location within the United States
- Location: Grant County, North Dakota, United States
- Nearest city: New Leipzig, ND
- Coordinates: 46°15′20″N 101°56′47″W
- Area: 800 acres (320 ha)
- Governing body: U.S. Fish and Wildlife Service

Pretty Rock National Wildlife Refuge is an 800-acre (320 ha) National Wildlife Refuge (NWR) in the U.S. state of North Dakota. Pretty Rock NWR is an easement refuge and is on privately owned land, but the landowners and U.S. Government work cooperatively to protect the resources. The U.S. Fish and Wildlife Service oversees Pretty Rock NWR from their offices at Audubon National Wildlife Refuge. This isolated refuge is 10 mi (16 km) south of New Leipzig, North Dakota and has been known as a temporary resting place for migrating whooping cranes. In 2002, six adults and one juvenile crane were spotted on the refuge.
