= Melvin J. Miller =

American politician (1919–1974)

- Born: May 19, 1919; Mott, North Dakota, US
- Died: November 15, 1974 (aged 55); Hotel St. Paul, Saint Paul, Minnesota, US
- Political party: Democratic Party

Melvin J. Miller (May 19, 1919 – November 15, 1974) was an American politician and farmer.

Miller was born in Mott, Hettinger County, North Dakota. He served in the United States Army Air Corps during World War II. Miller lived in Randall, Morrison County, Minnesota with his wife and family and was a farmer. Miller served as the Randall Town Assessor. He also served on the Randall Town Board and on the Randall Board of Education. Miller was a Democrat. He served in the Minnesota House of Representatives from 1973 until his death in 1974. Miller died from a heart attack at the Hotel St. Paul in Saint Paul, Minnesota. Miller was in Saint Paul for a Minnesota legislative committee meeting. He was re-elected to the Minnesota Legislature at the time of his death.
