= Dogtooth =

Dogtooth or dog tooth may refer to:

- Dogtooth (anatomy), a relatively long, pointed tooth
- Dogtooth, North Dakota, United States
- Dogtooth (film), a 2009 film directed by Yorgos Lanthimos
- Dog-tooth, an ornament found in medieval architecture
- Dogtooth spar, a mineral deposit found in limestone caves
- Dogtooth tuna, a species of pelagic marine fish
- Dog's-tooth violet, a plant in the lily family
- Dogtooth extension, a type of leading-edge extension on the wing of an aircraft
- Dog teeth, locking features of the dog clutch in unsynchronized manual transmissions
- "Dogtooth" (song), a 2023 song by Tyler, the Creator

== See also ==
- Houndstooth, a textile pattern also known as dogtooth
