= Mott/Regent School District =

School district in North Dakota, United States

Address
- 205 Dakota Ave Mott, North Dakota, 58646; United States

District information
- Type: Public
- Grades: PreK–12
- NCES District ID: 3800046

Students and staff
- Students: 211
- Teachers: 26.55
- Staff: 19.23
- Student–teacher ratio: 7.95

Other information
- Website: www.mott.k12.nd.us

Mott/Regent Public School District 1 is a school district with a single K-12 campus in Mott, North Dakota. As of 2021 enrollment is about 242.

Mostly in Hettinger County, it serves Mott and Regent. It also has sections in Adams and Stark counties.

The Mott/Regent School District's mascot is the Wildfire.

== History ==
The district was formerly in a North Dakota school construction loan program, but was pushed out by 2014 because it used all of the funds within a several month span that were intended for a two year period. Therefore the district was planning a school bond. The intended cost of the new school was at or below $14,900,000. The intended campus location, in the midpoint from the fairgrounds to the city limits, was to have a capacity of about 300. The district wanted the bond to be for $14,500,000. In May 2014 voters rejected two measures related to the school bond, with 63% opposing an increase of the debt levy and 60% against the levying of a bond itself. There were 838 voters, which Bill Gion, the president of the Mott-Regent school board, called "great turnout", and he concluded "The patrons have spoken, (there's) more work to do."

== Athletics ==
The Mott/Regent Wildfire won the 2007 North Dakota High School Nine Man Football championship, defeating the Napoleon-Gackle-Streeter Imperials.

In 2017 it started a cooperative American football team with the New England School District.
