= Grant County, North Dakota =

County in North Dakota, United States

- County
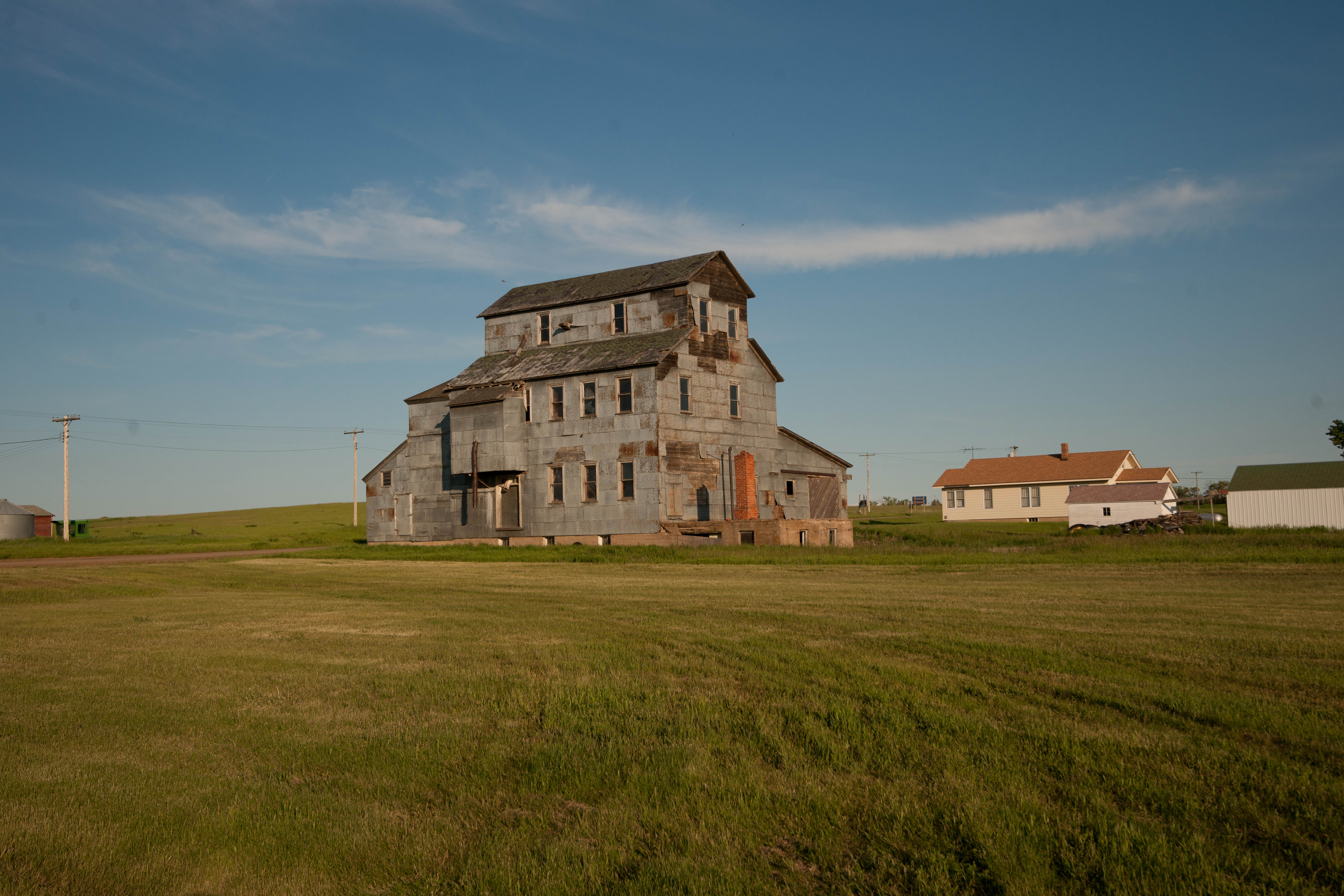
- Carson Roller Mill

- Location within the U.S. state of North Dakota
- Coordinates: 46.357827°N 101.639049°W
- Country: United States
- State: North Dakota
- Founded: November 7, 1916 (created); November 28, 1916 (organized)
- Named for: Ulysses S. Grant
- Seat: Carson
- Largest city: Elgin

Area
  - Total: 1,666.014 sq mi (4,314.96 km^{2})
  - Land: 1,659.233 sq mi (4,297.39 km^{2})
  - Water: 6.781 sq mi (17.56 km^{2}) 0.41%

Population (2020)
  - Total: 2,301
  - Estimate (2025): 2,206 ▼
  - Density: 1.354/sq mi (0.523/km^{2})
- Time zone: UTC−7 (Mountain)
  - Summer (DST): UTC−6 (MDT)
- Area code: 701
- Congressional district: At-large
- Website: grantcountynd.com

Grant County is a county in the U.S. state of North Dakota. As of the 2020 census, the population was 2,301. The county seat is Carson and the largest city is Elgin.

== History ==
The territory of Grant County was part of Morton County until 1916. On November 7 the county voters determined that the SW portion of the county would be partitioned off to form a new county, to be named after Ulysses S. Grant, the US President from 1869 to 1877. Accordingly, the county government was organized on November 28, with Carson as the seat. The county's boundaries have remained unchanged since its creation.

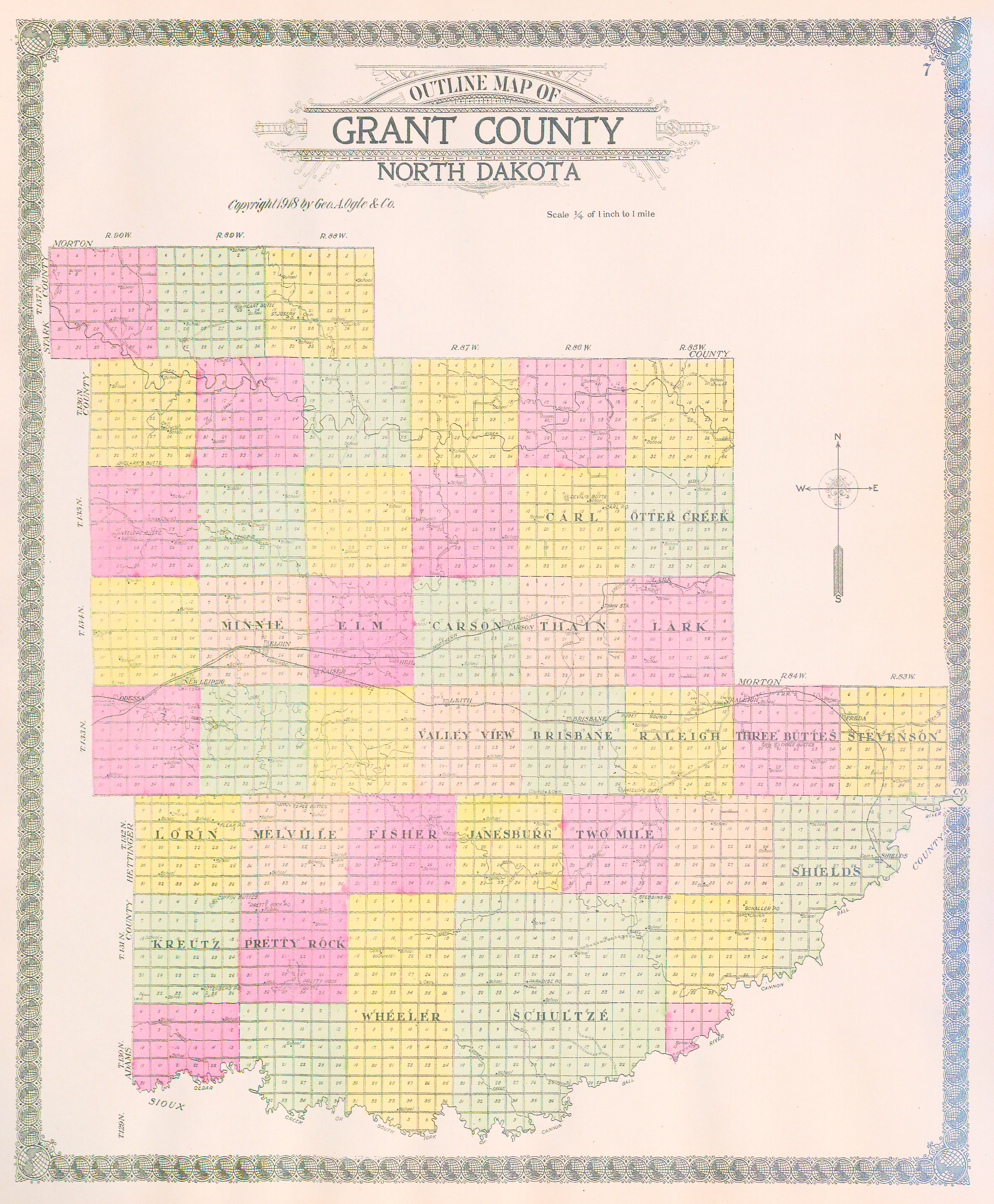
Outline map of Grant County, North Dakota, 1918

== Geography ==
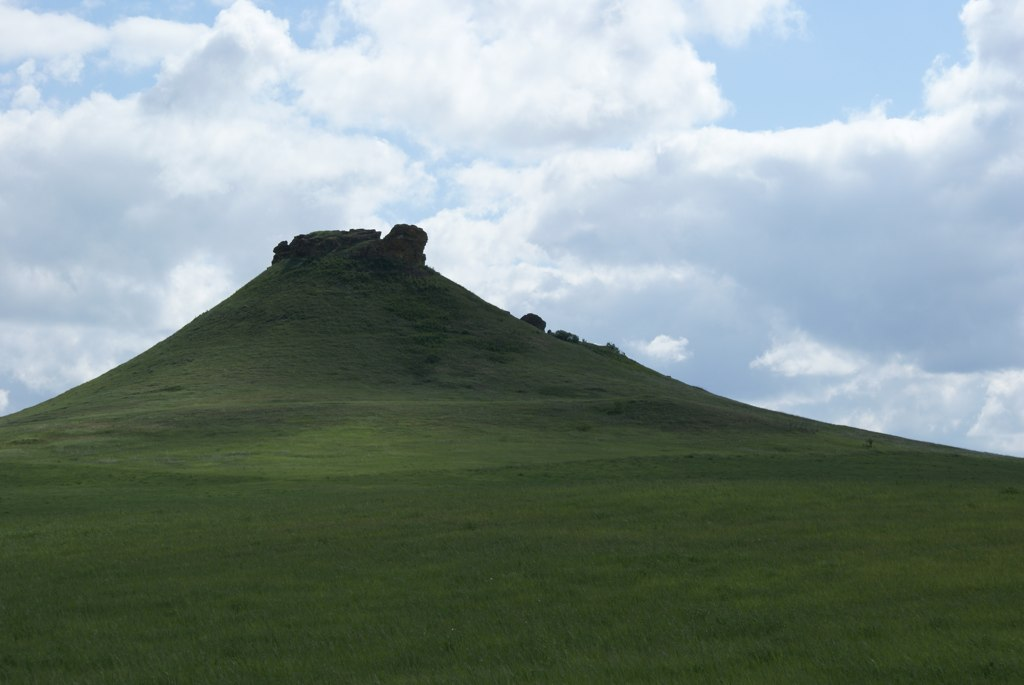
Heart Butte is a prominent geographic feature in Grant County, and the namesake for the nearby Heart Butte Dam.

The Heart River flows eastward through the upper part of Grant County, and Cedar Creek flows east-northeastward along the county's southern boundary line. The county terrain consists of isolated hills among rolling hills, carved by drainages. The semi-arid ground is partially devoted to agriculture. The terrain slopes to the east and south; its highest point is a rise near its southwestern corner, at 2,680 ft (820 m) ASL. The county has a total area of 1,666 square miles (4,310 km^{2}), of which 1,659 square miles (4,300 km^{2}) is land and 6.8 square miles (18 km^{2}) (0.4%) is water. Lake Tschida, a Bureau of Reclamation reservoir and recreation area on the Heart River, is the county's largest body of water.

The southwestern corner of North Dakota observes Mountain Time (Adams, Billings, Bowman, Golden Valley, Grant, Hettinger, Slope, and Stark counties). The counties of McKenzie, Dunn, and Sioux counties are split, with the western portions of each observing Mountain Time.

=== Major highways ===
- North Dakota Highway 21
- North Dakota Highway 31
- North Dakota Highway 49

=== Adjacent counties ===
- Morton County - northeast (observes Central Time)
- Sioux County - south
- Adams County - southwest
- Hettinger County - west
- Stark County - northwest

=== Protected areas ===
- Cedar River National Grassland (part)
- Heart Butte River State Game Management Area
- Otter Creek State Game Management Area
- Pretty Rock National Wildlife Refuge
- Sheep Creek Dam State Recreation Area

=== Lakes ===
- Pretty Rock Lake
- Sheep Creek Dam
- Lake Tschida

== Demographics ==
Historical population
Census	Pop.	Note	%±
1920	9,553		—
1930	10,134		6.1%
1940	8,264		−18.5%
1950	7,114		−13.9%
1960	6,248		−12.2%
1970	5,009		−19.8%
1980	4,274		−14.7%
1990	3,549		−17.0%
2000	2,841		−19.9%
2010	2,394		−15.7%
2020	2,301		−3.9%
2025 (est.)	2,206	▼	−4.1%
U.S. Decennial Census; 1790–1960 1900–1990; 1990–2000 2010–2020

As of the fourth quarter of 2024, the median home value in Grant County was $90,910.

=== 2020 census ===
As of the 2020 census, the county had a population of 2,301. Of the residents, 18.1% were under the age of 18 and 31.6% were 65 years of age or older; the median age was 53.1 years. For every 100 females there were 103.1 males, and for every 100 females age 18 and over there were 105.1 males.

The racial makeup of the county was 94.6% White, 0.4% Black or African American, 1.5% American Indian and Alaska Native, 0.5% Asian, 0.1% from some other race, and 3.0% from two or more races. Hispanic or Latino residents of any race comprised 1.1% of the population.

There were 1,028 households in the county, of which 20.3% had children under the age of 18 living with them and 19.4% had a female householder with no spouse or partner present. About 33.0% of all households were made up of individuals and 19.4% had someone living alone who was 65 years of age or older.

There were 1,649 housing units, of which 37.7% were vacant. Among occupied housing units, 83.4% were owner-occupied and 16.6% were renter-occupied. The homeowner vacancy rate was 2.2% and the rental vacancy rate was 22.3%.

=== 2010 census ===
As of the census of 2010, there were 2,394 people, 1,128 households, and 694 families in the county. The population density was 1.4 inhabitants per square mile (0.54/km^{2}). There were 1,690 housing units at an average density of 1.02 units per square mile (0.39/km^{2}). The racial makeup of the county was 97.2% white, 1.1% American Indian, 0.1% Asian, 0.2% from other races, and 1.3% from two or more races. Those of Hispanic or Latino origin made up 0.3% of the population. In terms of ancestry, 66.6% were German, 14.0% were Norwegian, 12.5% were Russian, 5.9% were Irish, 5.5% were English, and 2.2% were American.

Of the 1,128 households, 19.6% had children under the age of 18 living with them, 54.7% were married couples living together, 3.9% had a female householder with no husband present, 38.5% were non-families, and 36.5% of all households were made up of individuals. The average household size was 2.10 and the average family size was 2.72. The median age was 51.7 years.

The median income for a household in the county was $39,500 and the median income for a family was $53,542. Males had a median income of $33,750 versus $27,303 for females. The per capita income for the county was $25,840. About 7.3% of families and 13.0% of the population were below the poverty line, including 18.1% of those under age 18 and 18.7% of those age 65 or over.

== Communities ==
=== Cities ===
- Carson (county seat)
- Elgin
- Leith
- New Leipzig

=== Census-designated places ===
- Heil
- Raleigh

=== Unincorporated communities ===
- Brisbane
- Dogtooth
- Freda
- Johnson Ford
- Lark
- Saint Gertrude
- Shields

=== Townships ===
- Elm
- Fisher
- Freda
- Howe
- Lark
- Leipzig
- Minnie
- Pretty Rock
- Raleigh
- Rock
- Winona

=== Defunct township ===
- Otter Creek Township

== Politics ==
Grant County voters have traditionally voted Republican. In no national election since 1936 has the county selected the Democratic Party candidate.

United States presidential election results for Grant County, North Dakota
Year	Republican		Democratic		Third party(ies)	
Year	No.	%	No.	%	No.	%
1920	2,184	83.17%	296	11.27%	146	5.56%
1924	1,120	39.07%	125	4.36%	1,622	56.57%
1928	1,759	54.59%	1,434	44.51%	29	0.90%
1932	657	17.98%	2,912	79.69%	85	2.33%
1936	1,022	29.57%	1,858	53.76%	576	16.67%
1940	2,815	81.52%	627	18.16%	11	0.32%
1944	1,745	80.64%	410	18.95%	9	0.42%
1948	1,555	66.94%	689	29.66%	79	3.40%
1952	2,465	85.32%	403	13.95%	21	0.73%
1956	1,872	72.03%	718	27.63%	9	0.35%
1960	1,794	65.21%	955	34.71%	2	0.07%
1964	1,421	57.11%	1,063	42.73%	4	0.16%
1968	1,648	71.78%	488	21.25%	160	6.97%
1972	1,569	70.17%	596	26.65%	71	3.18%
1976	1,205	53.37%	952	42.16%	101	4.47%
1980	1,891	80.85%	317	13.55%	131	5.60%
1984	1,607	74.92%	507	23.64%	31	1.45%
1988	1,351	66.13%	654	32.01%	38	1.86%
1992	900	45.94%	415	21.18%	644	32.87%
1996	760	55.51%	300	21.91%	309	22.57%
2000	1,077	75.47%	235	16.47%	115	8.06%
2004	952	76.65%	264	21.26%	26	2.09%
2008	873	64.91%	405	30.11%	67	4.98%
2012	1,025	72.54%	334	23.64%	54	3.82%
2016	1,108	80.23%	185	13.40%	88	6.37%
2020	1,145	82.91%	207	14.99%	29	2.10%
2024	1,076	82.39%	205	15.70%	25	1.91%

== See also ==
- National Register of Historic Places listings in Grant County, North Dakota
