= Brisbane, North Dakota =

Ghost town of Grant County, North Dakota, United States

Coordinates: 46°20′33″N 101°29′28″W

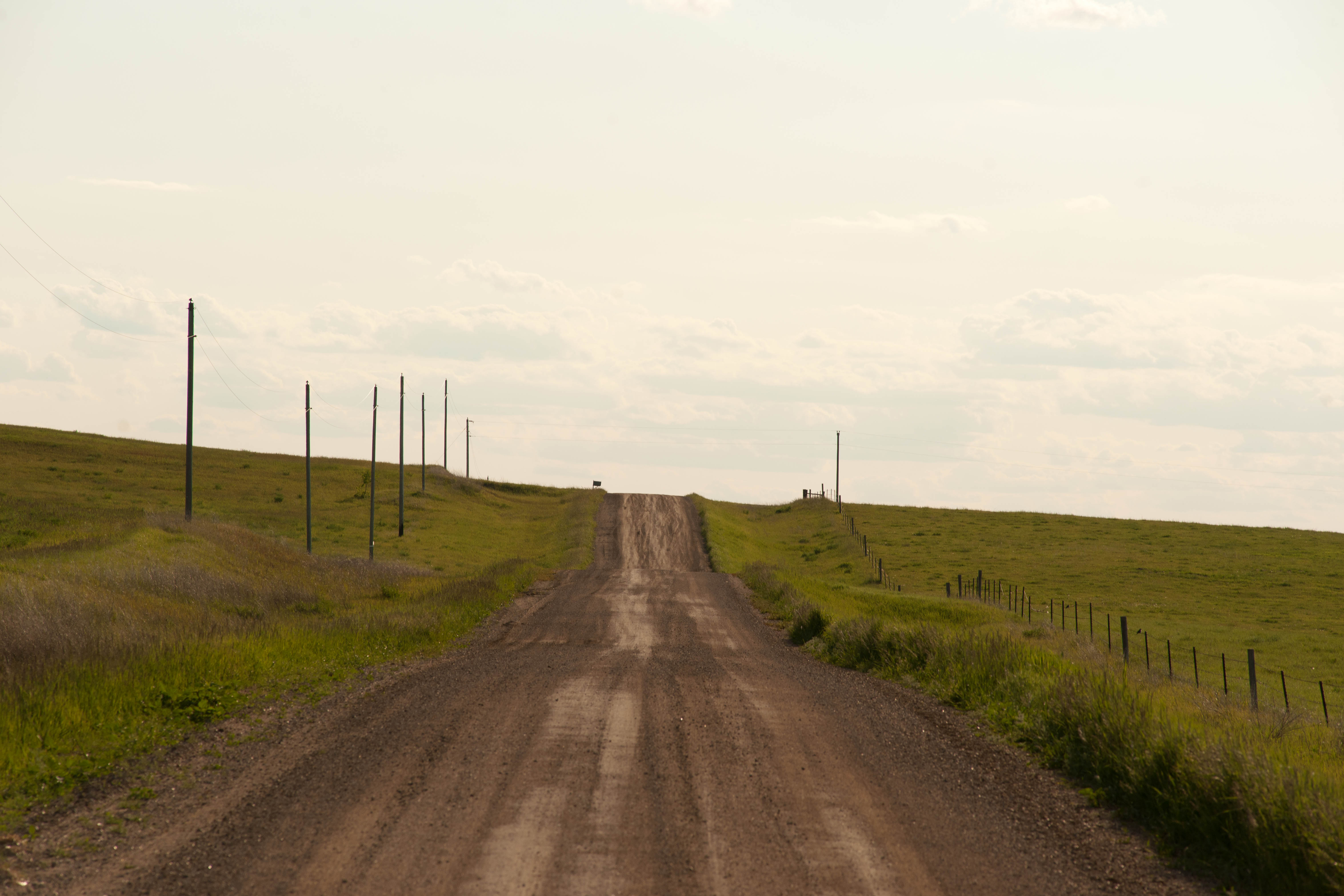
Road in Brisbane

Brisbane is a ghost town in what was then Morton County but today is Grant County in the U.S. state of North Dakota. It was named after the city of Brisbane, Australia. According to a 1913 newspaper article, the town was first settled in 1906, but more formally established in 1911:

In the spring of 1906 there were only a few people living in Brisbane vicinity. The first settlers were men, but in that year women arrived there. The attention of the first settlers was entirely given to stock raising, and no farming was done. Now all is changed and hundreds of acres of rich and fertile soil are annually producing under intelligent and careful farming, thousands of bushels of wheat oats and flax. The village of Brisbane started two years ago, and it is a hustling little town. The business interests are represented by a splendid general store owned and run by E.H. Robinson, a hardware and grocery store run by Sorum and Kindschi, and elevator managed by Martin Jacobs. There is also a blacksmith shop, a cement block building and a restaurant building. There are three school houses in the township and all the pupils within easy reach of the schools. There are four steam breaking outfits and threshing rigs in this township and they all have plenty of work for the coming spring. This part of the country is advancing fast and every one is doing well. Quite a little dairying is being carried on in the Brisbane vicinity. (Leith Index March 1, 1913)

A 1910 application for a new post office at Brisbane placed Brisbane in section 9 of Township 133 north, Range 86 west. In 1911, a new Presbyterian church was established in the town, which newspapers described as new at the time. In 1915, the Chicago & Northern Pacific Railroad established a station house and staffed it.

Reports from 1928 and 1931 show that Brisbane had a high school with active sports teams. In 1935, the First State Bank of Brisbane (which had opened in 1914) moved to Carson, North Dakota. As of the 1940s, the town still had an active Catholic church and elementary school for all Grant county children, but students attended high school in nearby Carson and McIntosh, South Dakota. In 1966, Brisbane served as a cattle shipping point.

== See also ==
- List of ghost towns in North Dakota
