= Bentley, North Dakota =

- City
- Location of Bentley, North Dakota
- Coordinates: 46°19′45″N 102°03′49″W
- Country: United States
- State: North Dakota
- County: Hettinger
- Elevation: 2,349 ft (716 m)
- Time zone: UTC-7 (MST)
  - Summer (DST): UTC-6 (MDT)
- GNIS feature ID: 1027893

Bentley is an unincorporated community in Hettinger County, North Dakota, United States. It was founded in 1910.

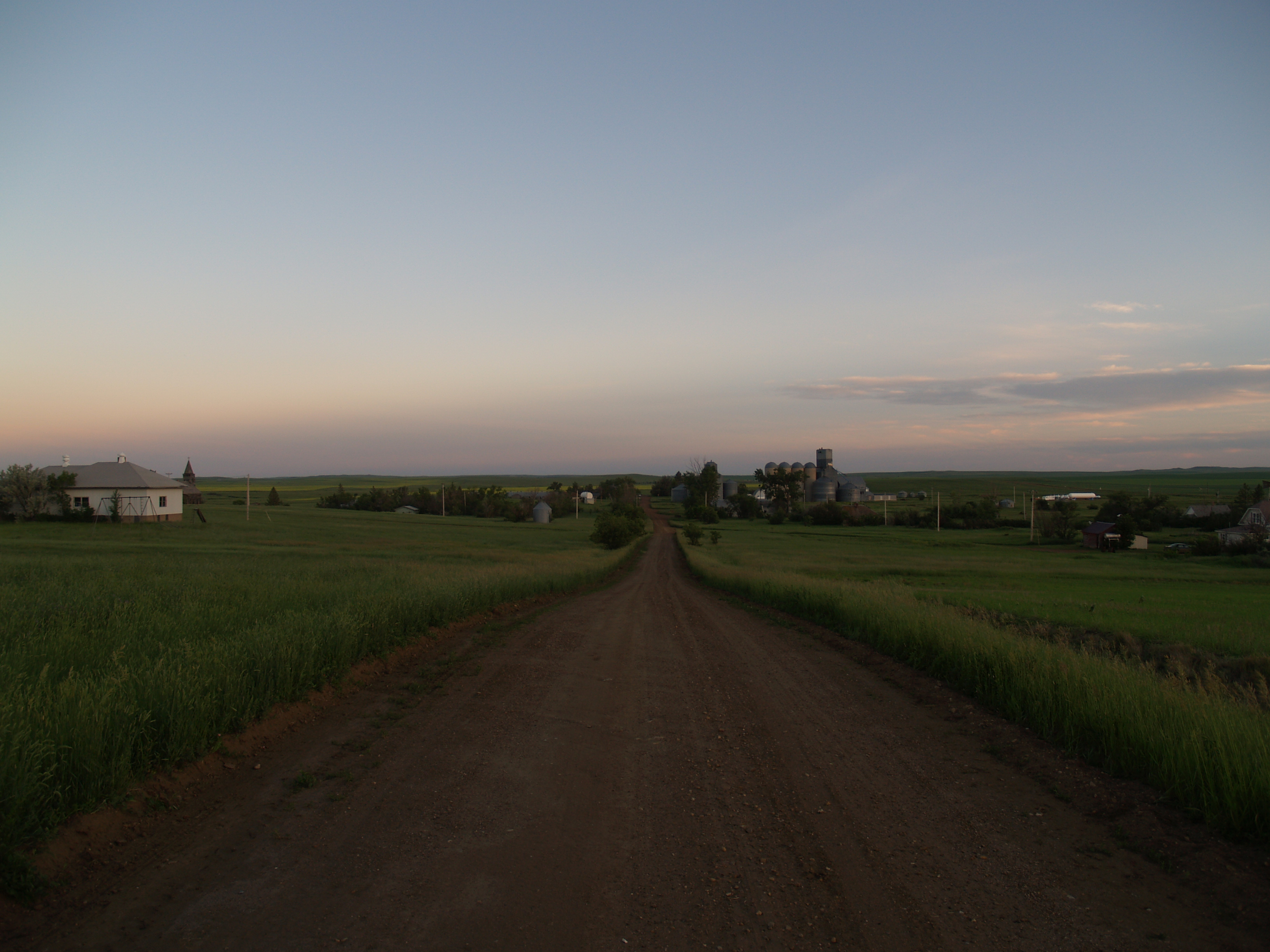
Road into Bentley

== History ==
The population was 110 in 1940.
