= Freda Township, Grant County, North Dakota =

Coordinates: 46°17′25″N 101°09′01″W

Freda Township is a township in Grant County, North Dakota, United States. Its population as of the 2000 Census was 12. It lies in the eastern part of the county along the Cannonball River.

== History ==
Freda Township is named after Freda Van Sickle, the daughter of a railroad foreman working on the Milwaukee Railroad. The identically named town of Freda was once a major population center in the township, with a population of 50 in 1920.

The township was founded after the county was organized in 1916, and had a peak population of 178 during the 1930 U.S. Census.

A meteorite displayed at the Smithsonian Institution's American Museum of Natural History was discovered here in 1919.
