= Mott, North Dakota =

- City
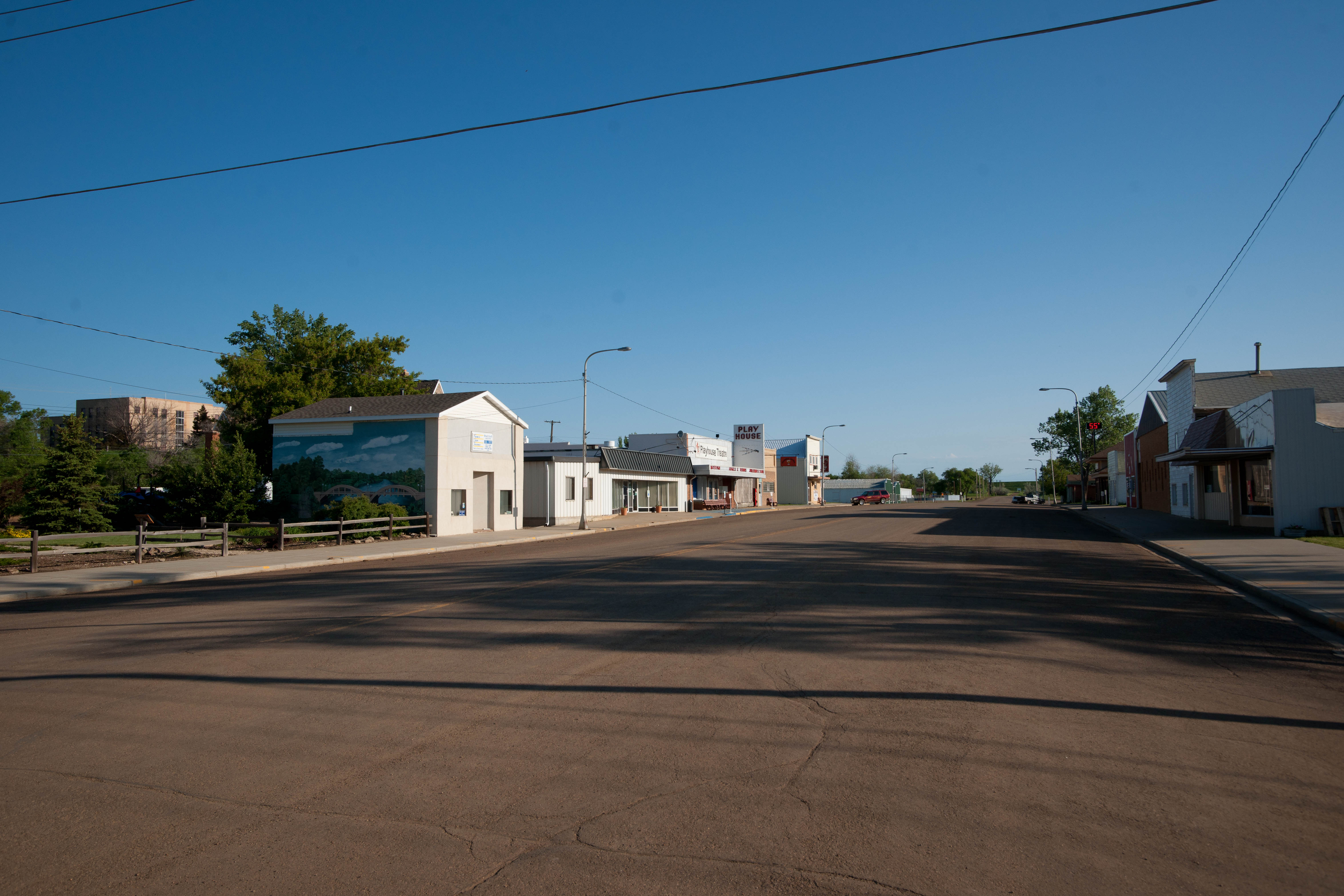
- Street scene in Mott

- Location of Mott, North Dakota
- Coordinates: 46°22′28″N 102°19′08″W
- Country: United States
- State: North Dakota
- County: Hettinger
- Founded: 1904

Area
  - Total: 0.92 sq mi (2.38 km^{2})
  - Land: 0.92 sq mi (2.38 km^{2})
  - Water: 0 sq mi (0.00 km^{2})
- Elevation: 2,408 ft (734 m)

Population (2020)
  - Total: 653
  - Estimate (2022): 635
  - Density: 710.8/sq mi (274.46/km^{2})
- Time zone: UTC-7 (Mountain (MST))
  - Summer (DST): UTC-6 (MDT)
- ZIP code: 58646
- Area code: 701
- FIPS code: 38-54620
- GNIS feature ID: 1036171
- Website: discovermott.com

Mott is a city in and the county seat of Hettinger County, North Dakota, United States. The population was 653 at the 2020 census.

== History ==
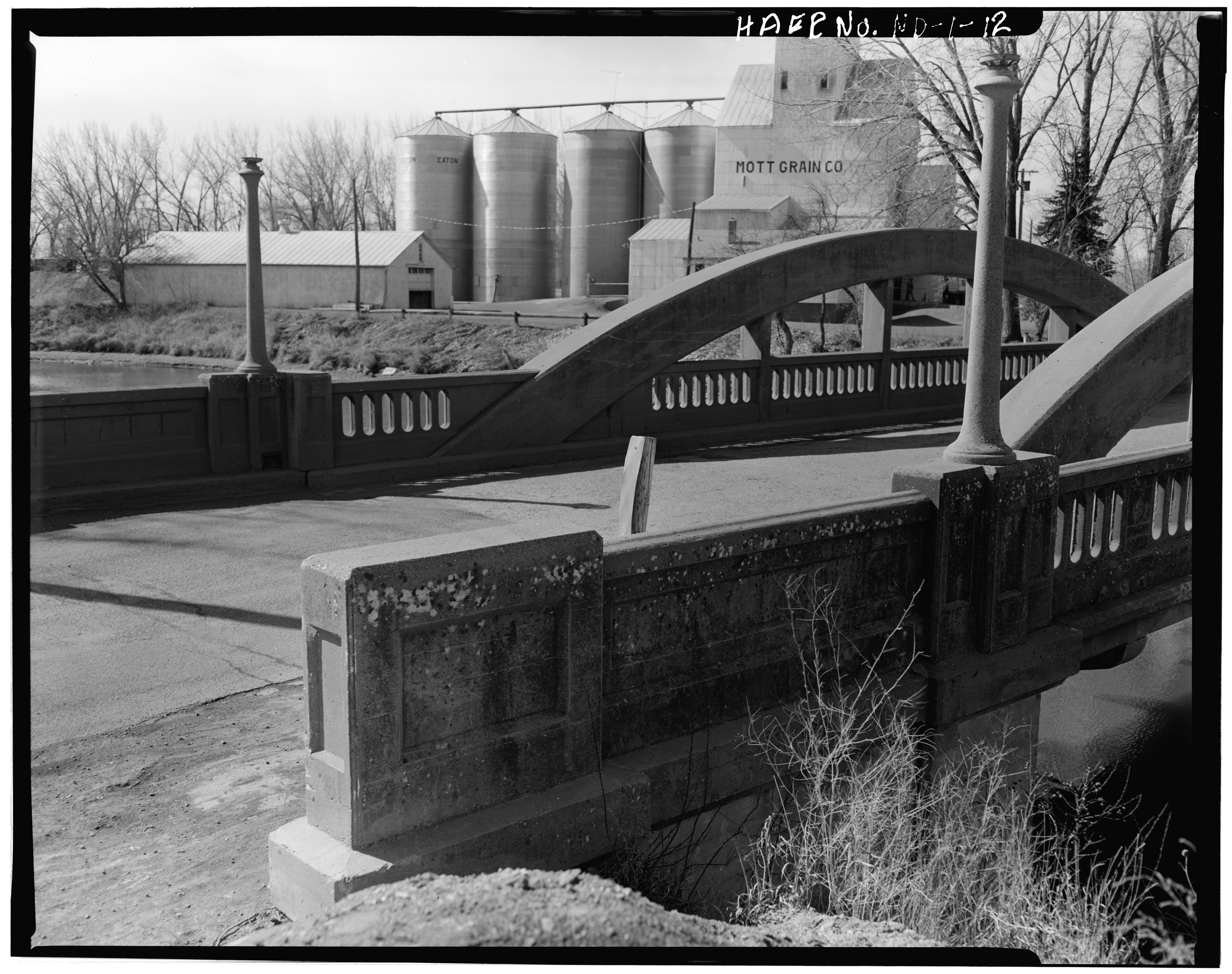
Mott Rainbow Arch Bridge

Mott was founded in 1904 when the surrounding territory was opened to settlers. There are conflicting stories of how the city was named. One theory is the city was named for Lillian Mott, the secretary of the town promoter, while the competing theory says the city was named for C. W. Mott, a railroad employee. A post office has been in operation at Mott since 1904.

A 1975 F4 tornado struck Mott, killing one and injuring four.

A distinctive symbol for Mott was the art deco arched "rainbow" bridge crossing the Cannonball River to the unincorporated area colloquially known as "West Mott". The arched bridge was damaged beyond repair in a 1997 flood.

== Geography ==
According to the United States Census Bureau, the city has a total area of 0.90 square miles (2.33 km^{2}), all land.

=== Climate ===
Climate data for Mott, North Dakota
Month	Jan	Feb	Mar	Apr	May	Jun	Jul	Aug	Sep	Oct	Nov	Dec	Year
Record high °F (°C)	67 (19)	71 (22)	80 (27)	95 (35)	96 (36)	106 (41)	110 (43)	108 (42)	105 (41)	95 (35)	84 (29)	67 (19)	110 (43)
Mean daily maximum °F (°C)	27 (−3)	32 (0)	42 (6)	57 (14)	67 (19)	77 (25)	85 (29)	85 (29)	73 (23)	59 (15)	42 (6)	29 (−2)	56 (13)
Mean daily minimum °F (°C)	4 (−16)	8 (−13)	18 (−8)	28 (−2)	40 (4)	50 (10)	55 (13)	53 (12)	41 (5)	29 (−2)	18 (−8)	6 (−14)	29 (−2)
Record low °F (°C)	−42 (−41)	−44 (−42)	−33 (−36)	−13 (−25)	4 (−16)	29 (−2)	36 (2)	31 (−1)	12 (−11)	−8 (−22)	−25 (−32)	−39 (−39)	−44 (−42)
Average precipitation inches (mm)	0.42 (11)	0.77 (20)	0.91 (23)	1.7 (43)	2.53 (64)	2.85 (72)	2.19 (56)	1.52 (39)	1.32 (34)	1.28 (33)	0.60 (15)	0.50 (13)	16.59 (423)
Source: The Weather Channel

== Demographics ==
Historical population
Census	Pop.	Note	%±
1920	723		—
1930	1,036		43.3%
1940	1,220		17.8%
1950	1,583		29.8%
1960	1,463		−7.6%
1970	1,368		−6.5%
1980	1,315		−3.9%
1990	1,019		−22.5%
2000	808		−20.7%
2010	721		−10.8%
2020	653		−9.4%
2022 (est.)	635		−2.8%
U.S. Decennial Census; 2020 Census

=== 2010 census ===
As of the census of 2010, there were 721 people, 315 households, and 191 families residing in the city. The population density was 801.1 inhabitants per square mile (309.3/km^{2}). There were 415 housing units at an average density of 461.1 per square mile (178.0/km^{2}). The racial makeup of the city was 97.9% White, 0.4% Native American, and 1.7% from two or more races.

There were 315 households, of which 21.6% had children under the age of 18 living with them, 53.0% were married couples living together, 7.0% had a female householder with no husband present, 0.6% had a male householder with no wife present, and 39.4% were non-families. 37.1% of all households were made up of individuals, and 23.2% had someone living alone who was 65 years of age or older. The average household size was 2.12 and the average family size was 2.75.

The median age in the city was 52.9 years. 20.4% of residents were under the age of 18; 3.6% were between the ages of 18 and 24; 15% were from 25 to 44; 27% were from 45 to 64; and 34% were 65 years of age or older. The gender makeup of the city was 47.2% male and 52.8% female.

=== 2000 census ===
As of the census of 2000, there were 808 people, 362 households, and 205 families residing in the city. The population density was 894.4 inhabitants per square mile (345.3/km^{2}). There were 441 housing units at an average density of 488.1 per square mile (188.5/km^{2}). The racial makeup of the city was 99.50% White, 0.12% Native American, 0.25% Pacific Islander, and 0.12% from two or more races.

There were 362 households, out of which 22.4% had children under the age of 18 living with them, 50.6% were married couples living together, 5.5% had a female householder with no husband present, and 43.1% were non-families. 42.3% of all households were made up of individuals, and 27.6% had someone living alone who was 65 years of age or older. The average household size was 2.06 and the average family size was 2.83.

In the city, the population was spread out, with 20.8% under the age of 18, 3.0% from 18 to 24, 18.1% from 25 to 44, 23.9% from 45 to 64, and 34.3% who were 65 years of age or older. The median age was 51 years. For every 100 females, there were 87.0 males. For every 100 females age 18 and over, there were 86.6 males.

The median income for a household in the city was $27,583, and the median income for a family was $33,929. Males had a median income of $24,327 versus $15,833 for females. The per capita income for the city was $15,718. About 9.6% of families and 13.9% of the population were below the poverty line, including 21.5% of those under age 18 and 13.6% of those age 65 or over.

== Education ==
Mott shares the Mott/Regent School District, a unified school district with nearby Regent. Grades K-12 are located in Mott. The school districts's mascot is the Wildfire.

Prior to unification the Mott School District's mascot was the Cardinals.

== Notable people ==
- James Bannon, Wisconsin state legislator and politician, moved to a farm in Mott in 1905.
- Eric Hardmeyer, president and CEO of the Bank of North Dakota
- James Kerzman, North Dakota state legislator, farmer, and rancher
- Melvin J. Miller, Minnesota state legislator and farmer
- Larry Woiwode, author and poet laureate of North Dakota
