= Morrill Township =

Morrill Township may refer to the following townships in the United States:

- Morrill Township, Brown County, Kansas
- Morrill Township, Morrison County, Minnesota

== See also ==
- Merrill Township (disambiguation)
