= Dogtooth, North Dakota =

- Ghost town
- Interactive map of Dogtooth, North Dakota
- Country: United States
- State: North Dakota
- County: Grant County

Dogtooth is a ghost town in Grant County, North Dakota, United States. It was so named because the shape of the nearby buttes resembled the molars of a dog's lower jaw. The town was located in Section 11 of survey township T133 North, Range 85 West.

== History ==
Dogtooth was first established in 1876 as a station along the Deadwood - Bismarck Trail. The station closed in 1880 when the Northern Pacific Railroad was completed, but settlers continued to homestead in the area. A post office was established and operated by Robert Pearce March 20, 1900. The November 26, 1909, edition of the Mandan Pioneer reported that Dogtooth had "a great out look for a thriving metropolis as the Milwaukee have surveyed a town near where Dogtooth now stands . . . this part of the country is settled with people who will do all in their power to make it a good town as they will certainly appreciate so near a town after having to haul their grain fifty and sixty miles to a railroad." The Pioneer on April 8, 1910, described the new town of Raleigh, located just two miles to the east along the Milwaukee Railroad with "a few buildings have already been built, including a store and blacksmith shop. The population is mixed, largely Scandinavian."

In 1910 Charles Leonard, who operated a store in Dogtooth, moved his business to Raleigh and opened a post office that October. Dogtooth slowly died out as Raleigh grew. The Carson Press reported on January 12, 1911, about Mr. Leonard's decision to move his store and establish a post office in Raleigh, suggesting that this move put "the finishing touches on Dogtooth."
