= James Kerzman =

American politician

James Alan Kerzman (March 2, 1947 – June 20, 2015) was an American farmer, rancher, and politician. He served in the North Dakota House of Representatives from 1991 to 2009.

Born in Minot, North Dakota, Kerzman lived on a farm near Emmet, North Dakota and then moved with his family to another farm in Mott, North Dakota where he lived with his family. He graduated from Assumption Abbey High School in Richardton, North Dakota. Kerzman then went to Dickinson State University and North Dakota State College of Science studying mechanics. Kerzman was involved with the rural electric cooperative. From 1991 until 2009, Kerzman served in the North Dakota House of Representatives and was a Democrat. Kerzman died in a tractor accident on his farm near Mott, North Dakota.
