= Alden Township, Hettinger County, North Dakota =

Coordinates: 46°20′00″N 102°35′02″W

Alden Township is a defunct township in Hettinger County in the U.S. state of North Dakota. The population was 18 at the 2000 census. It is now part of Central Hettinger unorganized territory along with Indian Creek Township.

== Geography ==
The latitude of Alden is 46.333N, and the longitude is -102.583W. The area was 36.15 square miles (93.6 km^{2}), and the population density was 0.50 per square mile.

== Demographics ==
All residents are white and fall in the 45 to 64 age bracket.
