= Neuburg Congregational Church =

Historic church in North Dakota, United States

- U.S. National Register of Historic Places
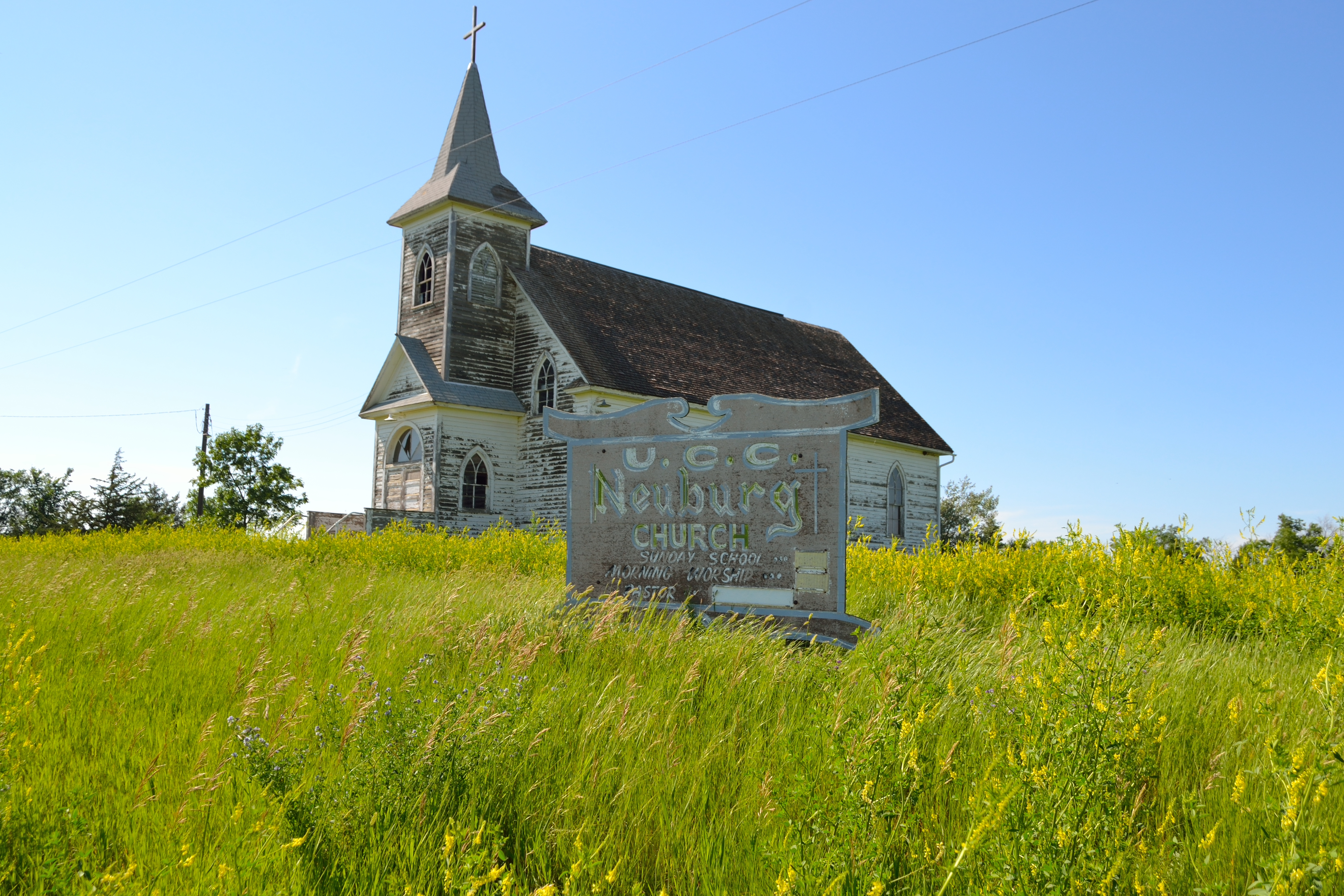

- Location within North Dakota Location within the United States
- Nearest city: Mott, North Dakota
- Coordinates: 46°35′16″N 102°9′24″W
- Area: 6.4 acres (2.6 ha)
- Built: 1925
- Architectural style: Gothic Revival
- NRHP reference No.: 07000822
- Added to NRHP: August 15, 2007

Neuburg Congregational Church near Mott, North Dakota was built in 1925. It has Gothic Revival architecture.

It was listed on the National Register of Historic Places in 2007. The listing includes a contributing building, a contributing site, and a contributing structure. It includes a cemetery within its 6.4 acres (2.6 ha).

In 1925, early in the Great Depression, it was voted by a group of German-Russian immigrants to build a new church.
