= Emmet, North Dakota =

Community in North Dakota, United States

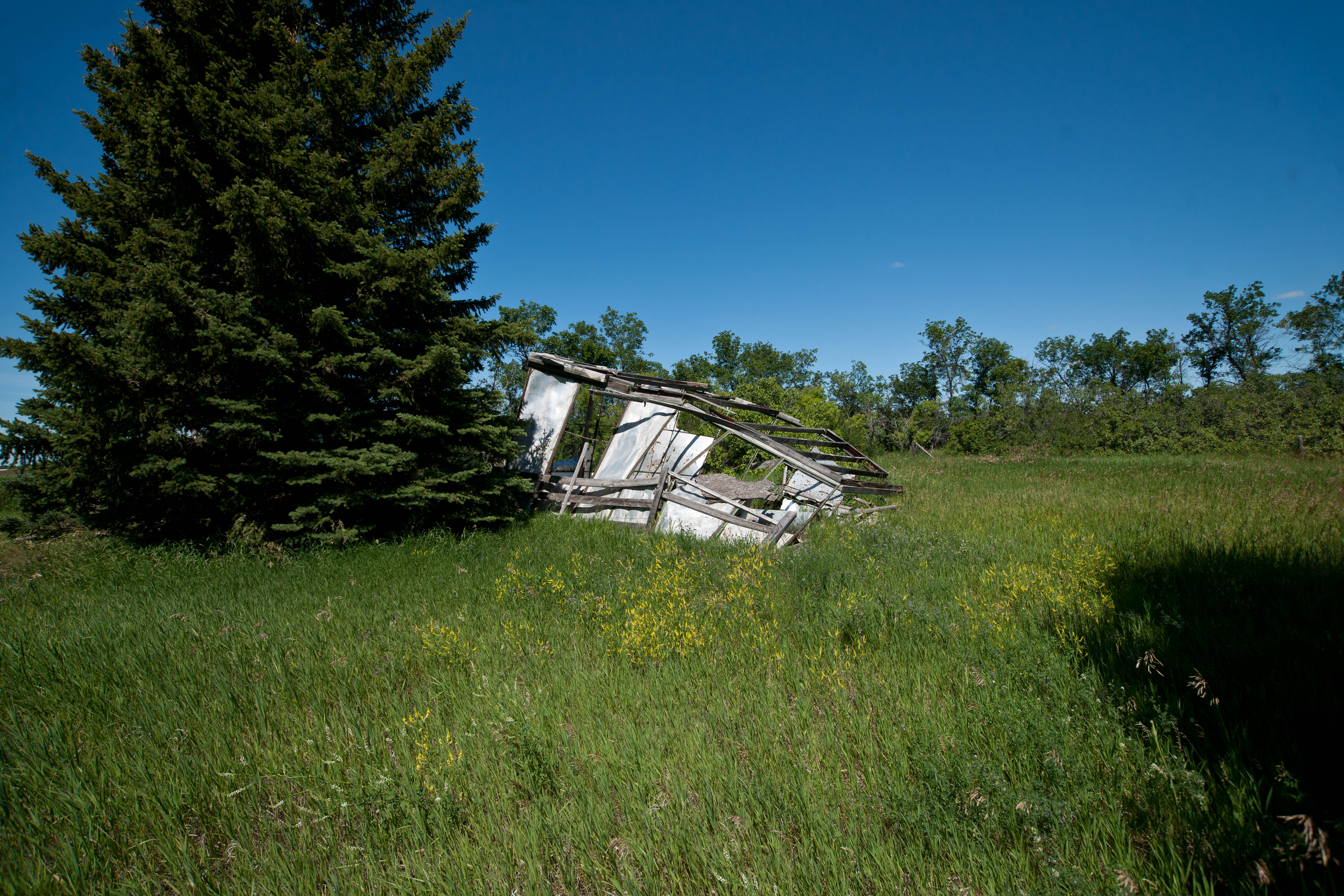
- Emmet in 2009

- Location within North Dakota Location within the United States
- Coordinates: 47°38′47″N 101°39′13″W
- Country: United States
- State: North Dakota
- County: McLean
- Elevation: 2,014 ft (614 m)
- Time zone: UTC-6 (Central (CST))
  - Summer (DST): UTC-5 (CDT)
- Area code: 701
- GNIS feature ID: 1028885

Emmet was a small rural community in McLean County, North Dakota, United States. It is about twelve miles west of Garrison. There is no longer anything at the location, although it may still be marked on some maps. Emmet was in existence until at least 1966.

== Naming ==
The community was founded in 1903 with the name of Robinson (not to be confused with the current Robinson, North Dakota, which is in an entirely different location). It was renamed Emmet by Charles Laudenbeck when he took over as postmaster on 2 September 1905. He named it after his young son, Emmet. The population was 3 in 1940.

== Notable person ==
- James Kerzman, North Dakota state legislator, rancher, and farmer, lived on a farm near Emmet. Kerzman's parents were killed when the ambulance taking his mother to hospital with a newborn daughter was involved in a collision in 1965. The fifteen Kerzman children (including the daughter Mayruth from the ambulance crash) were brought up by relatives near Emmet. Kerzman's uncle, Francis Kerzman, built an extension to his house there to accommodate them all.
