= Carson Roller Mill =

- U.S. National Register of Historic Places
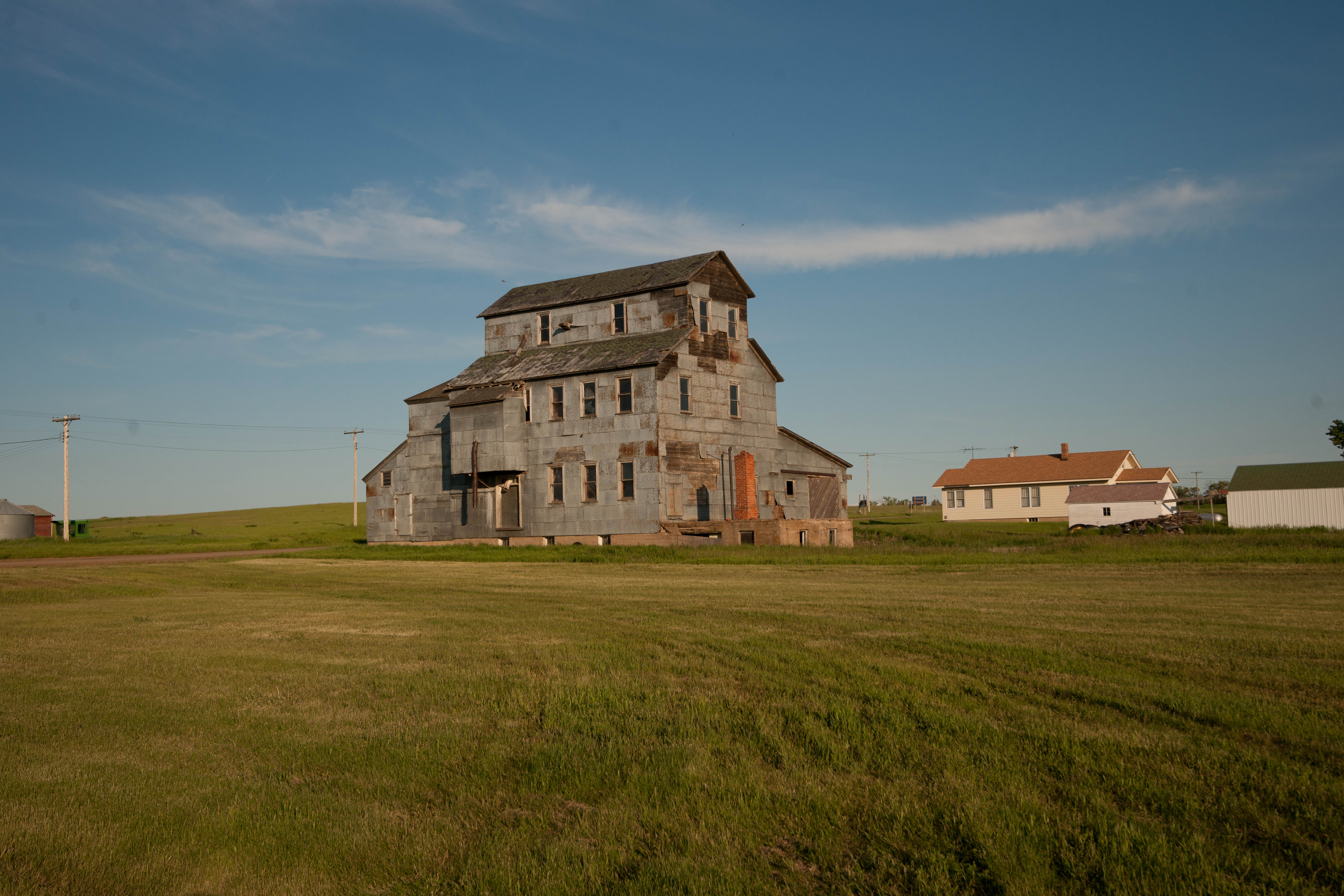

- Location within North Dakota Location within the United States
- Location: S side of Carson, Carson, North Dakota
- Coordinates: 46°25′6″N 101°33′50″W
- Area: less than one acre
- Built: 1913
- NRHP reference No.: 80002915
- Added to NRHP: April 30, 1980

The Carson Roller Mill is a manufacturing facility in Carson, North Dakota that was built in 1913. It was listed on the National Register of Historic Places (NRHP) in 1980.

According to its NRHP nomination, it "is the only known roller flour mill in North Dakota to remain essentially unaltered and to contain its original equipment." It is evaluated to be "a rare and valuable example of industrial technology related to the commerce and industry of North Dakota's early settlement period."
