= Leonard J. Jacobs =

American politician (1928–2024)

Member of the North Dakota House of Representatives
- In office 1993–1998

Personal details
- Born: June 19, 1928 near Regent, North Dakota, U.S.
- Died: October 7, 2024 (aged 96) Hettinger, North Dakota, U.S.
- Party: Republican
- Spouse: Carol
- Children: 5

Leonard J. Jacobs (June 19, 1928 – October 7, 2024) was an American politician. He served as a Republican member of the North Dakota House of Representatives.

== Life and career ==
Jacobs was born near Regent, North Dakota, on June 19, 1928. He was a farmer and rancher. Jacobs served in the North Dakota House of Representatives from 1993 to 1998. He died in Hettinger, North Dakota, on October 7, 2024, at the age of 96.
