= Freda, North Dakota =

Coordinates: 46°20′50″N 101°10′25″W

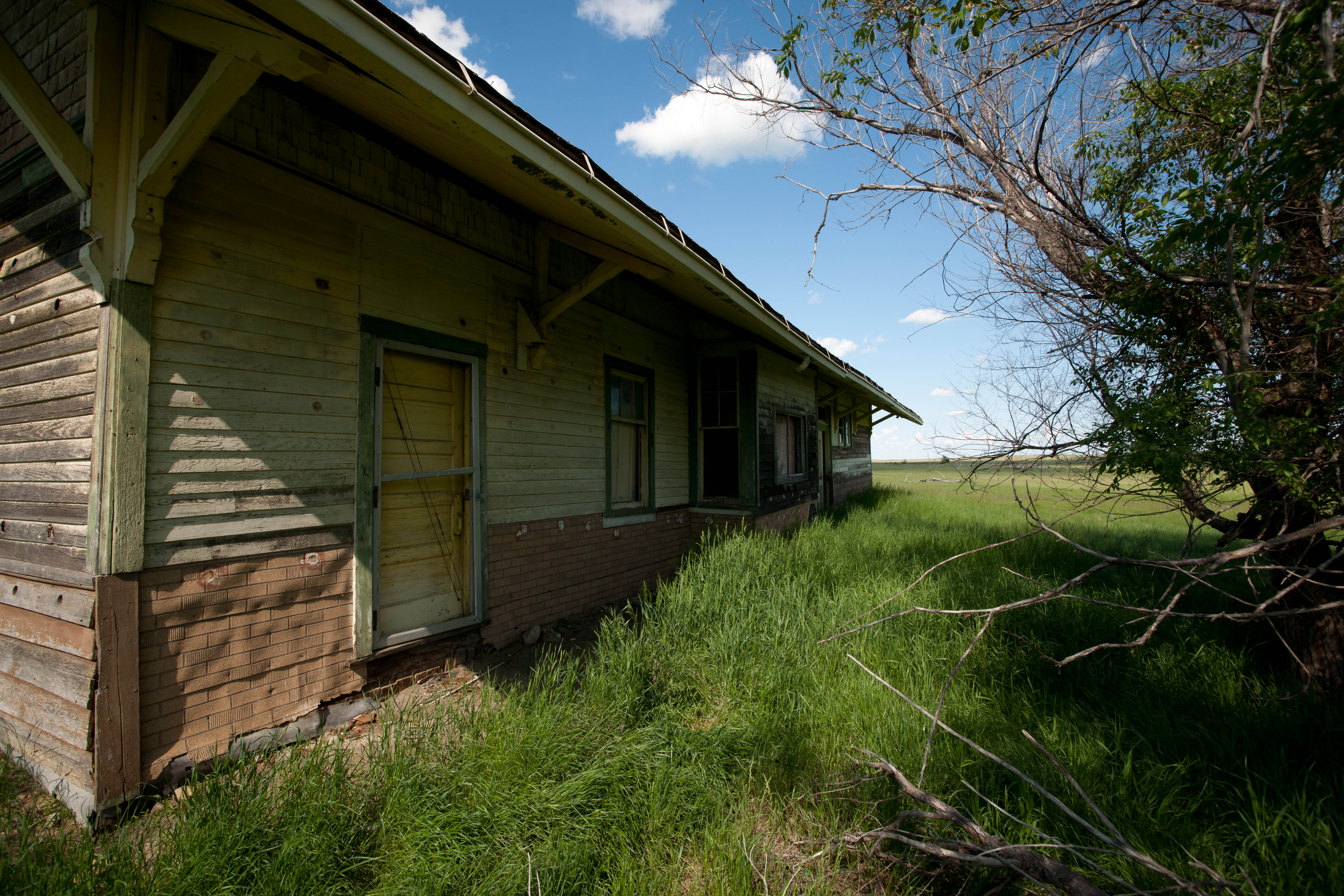
Building in Freda

Freda is an unincorporated community and ghost town in Grant County, North Dakota, United States. It is part of Freda Township.

== History ==
Freda was founded in 1910 as a station along the Milwaukee Railroad, when the area was still part of Morton County. It was named for Freda Van Sickle, the daughter of the railroad's construction foreman. It was once a major population center in the area, with a peak population of 50 in 1920. Freda replaced an older town of Pearce, which was a rural post office founded in 1906 by postmaster Asa Levi Pearce. The post office was later moved one mile to the west and renamed Freda. The post office closed in 1975, and in 1976 just two people were reportedly still living in the town.

A meteorite displayed at the Smithsonian Institution's American Museum of Natural History was discovered here in 1919.
