= Raleigh, North Dakota =

- Census-designated place
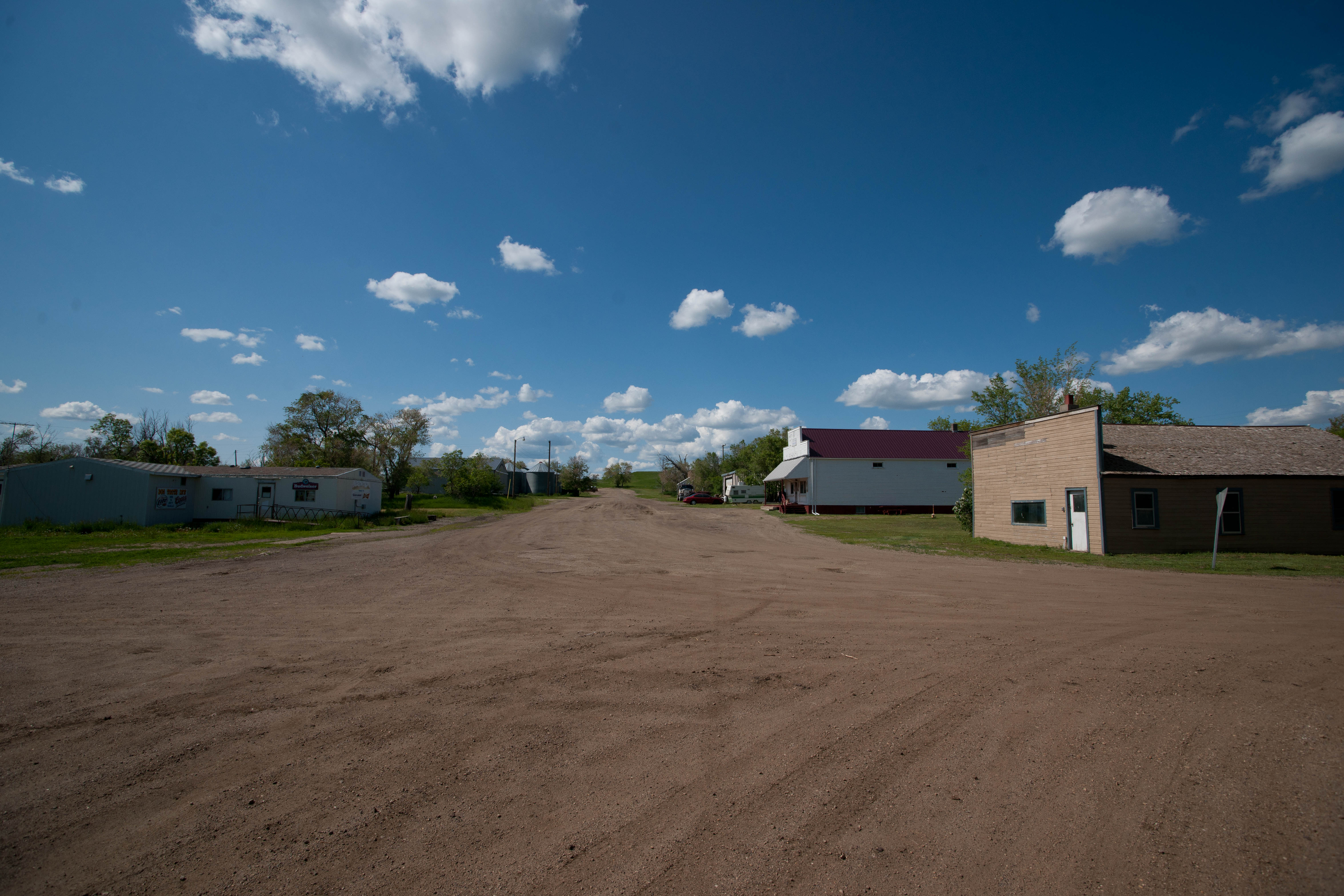
- Street in Raleigh

- Location within North Dakota Location within the United States
- Coordinates: 46°21′26″N 101°18′19″W
- Country: United States
- State: North Dakota
- County: Grant

Area
  - Total: 0.29 sq mi (0.74 km^{2})
  - Land: 0.29 sq mi (0.74 km^{2})
  - Water: 0 sq mi (0.00 km^{2})
- Elevation: 2,054 ft (626 m)

Population (2020)
  - Total: 14
  - Density: 48.8/sq mi (18.83/km^{2})
- Time zone: UTC-7 (Mountain (MST))
  - Summer (DST): UTC-6 (MDT)
- Area code: 701
- GNIS feature ID: 2584354

Raleigh is a census-designated place (CDP) in Grant County, North Dakota, United States. An unincorporated community, it was designated as part of the U.S. Census Bureau's Participant Statistical Areas Program on March 31, 2010. It was not counted separately during the 2000 Census, but was included in the 2010 Census, where a population of 12 was reported. As of the 2020 census, Raleigh had a population of 14.

== Geography ==
It is located in the northeast quarter of section 12 of Township 133 north, Range 86 west. The post office opened October 1, 1910, with Charles C. Leonard as postmaster, after he moved his general store here from Dogtooth, a nearby town and post office which soon afterward ceased to exist.

== Demographics ==
Historical population
Census	Pop.	Note	%±
2020	14		—
U.S. Decennial Census

== History ==
Raleigh is situated in what was originally Morton County but today is Grant County. Raleigh was created as a coaling stop along the Milwaukee Road branch line that separated from the railroad's Pacific Extension in McLaughlin, South Dakota and ran to New England, North Dakota. The name comes from Sir Walter Raleigh and was settled by a wave of German Russians who had previously settled near Strasburg in Emmons County.
