= Merrill Township, Hettinger County, North Dakota =

Merrill Township, North Dakota
- Township
- Location within the state of North Dakota
- Coordinates: 46°14′57″N 102°12′35″W
- Country: United States
- State: North Dakota
- County: Hettinger

Area
  - Total: 32.4 sq mi (83.8 km^{2})
  - Land: 32.1 sq mi (83.1 km^{2})
  - Water: 0.27 sq mi (0.7 km^{2})
- Elevation: 2,448 ft (746 m)

Population (2000)
  - Total: 13
  - Density: 0.52/sq mi (0.2/km^{2})
- Time zone: UTC-7 (Mountain (MST))
  - Summer (DST): UTC-6 (MDT)
- Area code: 701
- FIPS code: 38-52540
- GNIS feature ID: 1037210

Merrill is a township in Hettinger County, North Dakota, United States. The population was 13 at the 2000 census.
