= Acme Township, Hettinger County, North Dakota =

Acme Township, North Dakota
- Township
- Location within the state of North Dakota
- Coordinates: 46°29′45″N 102°20′59″W
- Country: United States
- State: North Dakota
- County: Hettinger

Area
  - Total: 36.0 sq mi (93.3 km^{2})
  - Land: 36.0 sq mi (93.3 km^{2})
  - Water: 0 sq mi (0.0 km^{2})
- Elevation: 2,507 ft (764 m)

Population (2000)
  - Total: 37
  - Density: 1.0/sq mi (0.4/km^{2})
- Time zone: UTC-7 (Mountain (MST))
  - Summer (DST): UTC-6 (MDT)
- Area code: 701
- FIPS code: 38-00220
- GNIS feature ID: 1759444

Acme Township is a township in Hettinger County, North Dakota, United States. Its population during the 2000 Census was 37.
