= Regent, North Dakota =

- City
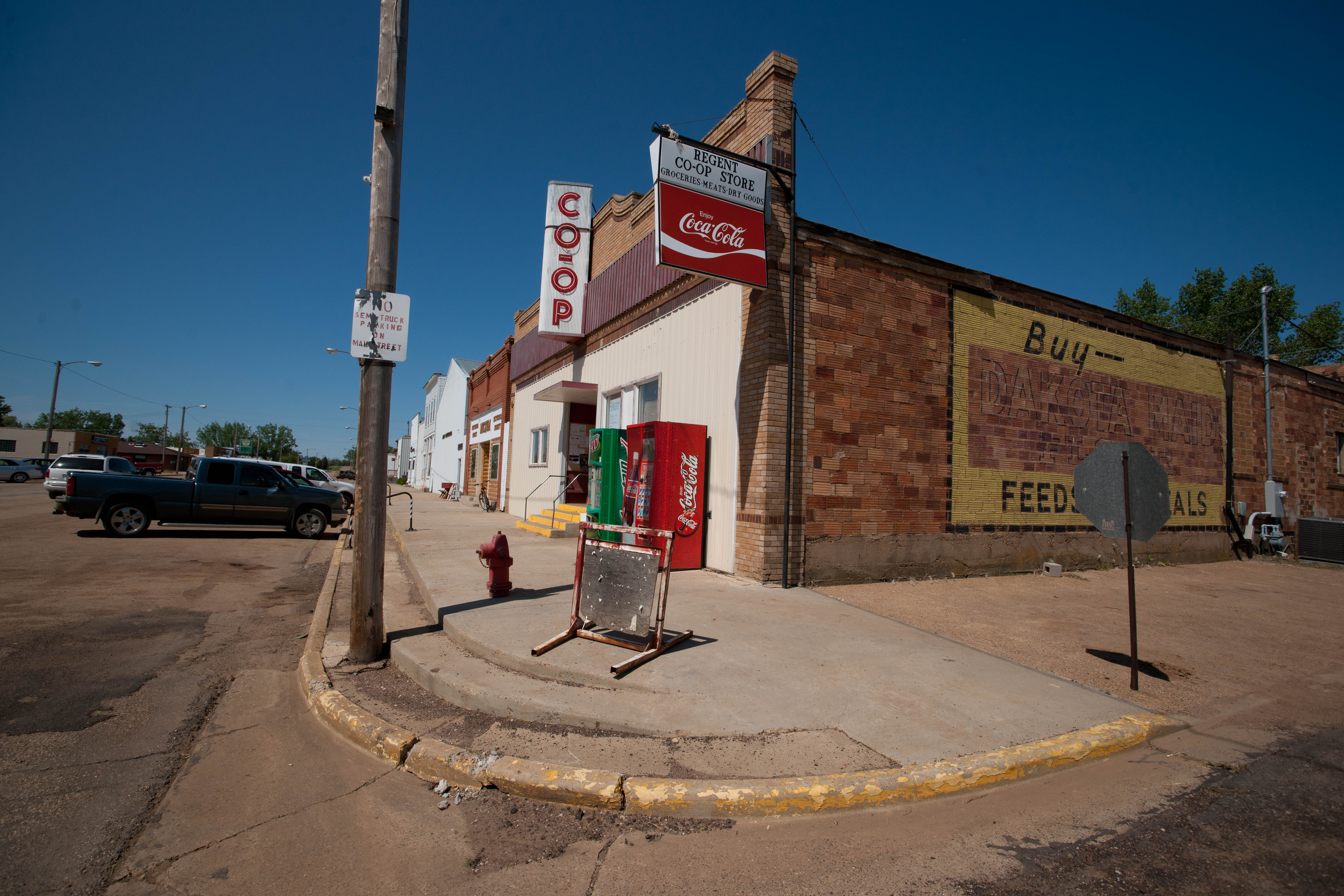
- Regent

- Location of Regent, North Dakota
- Coordinates: 46°25′20″N 102°33′29″W
- Country: United States
- State: North Dakota
- County: Hettinger
- Founded: 1910

Area
  - Total: 0.56 sq mi (1.45 km^{2})
  - Land: 0.56 sq mi (1.45 km^{2})
  - Water: 0 sq mi (0.00 km^{2})
- Elevation: 2,464 ft (751 m)

Population (2020)
  - Total: 170
  - Estimate (2022): 167
  - Density: 303.7/sq mi (117.25/km^{2})
- Time zone: UTC-7 (Mountain (MST))
  - Summer (DST): UTC-6 (MDT)
- ZIP code: 58650
- Area code: 701
- FIPS code: 38-66020
- GNIS feature ID: 1036234

Regent is a city in Hettinger County, North Dakota, United States. The population was 170 at the 2020 census.

== History ==
Regent was founded in 1910 when the railroad was extended to that point. The city was so named with the aim of promoting its central location in order to attract the county seat. A post office has been in operation at Regent since 1910.

In 1999, Consolidated Telephone Cooperative had been the sole provider of telephone service. Western Wireless began providing service by cellular connection and thus saving the costs of installing wires. Angered by the loss of its customers, Consolidated refused to connect calls to and from Western's central switch, effectively disconnecting all of Western's customers in town. Western complained to regulatory authorities, and Consolidated agreed to connect the disconnected customers.

== Geography ==
According to the United States Census Bureau, the city has a total area of 0.56 square miles (1.45 km^{2}), all land.

== Demographics ==
Historical population
Census	Pop.	Note	%±
1920	262		—
1930	308		17.6%
1940	261		−15.3%
1950	405		55.2%
1960	388		−4.2%
1970	344		−11.3%
1980	297		−13.7%
1990	268		−9.8%
2000	211		−21.3%
2010	160		−24.2%
2020	170		6.3%
2022 (est.)	167		−1.8%
U.S. Decennial Census; 2020 Census

=== 2010 census ===
As of the census of 2010, there were 160 people, 80 households, and 47 families residing in the city. The population density was 285.7 inhabitants per square mile (110.3/km^{2}). There were 120 housing units at an average density of 214.3 per square mile (82.7/km^{2}). The racial makeup of the city was 97.5% White, 1.9% Native American, and 0.6% from two or more races.

There were 80 households, of which 16.3% had children under the age of 18 living with them, 50.0% were married couples living together, 7.5% had a female householder with no husband present, 1.3% had a male householder with no wife present, and 41.3% were non-families. 41.3% of all households were made up of individuals, and 21.3% had someone living alone who was 65 years of age or older. The average household size was 2.00 and the average family size was 2.70.

The median age in the city was 52 years. 16.9% of residents were under the age of 18; 4.4% were between the ages of 18 and 24; 16.3% were from 25 to 44; 33.2% were from 45 to 64; and 29.4% were 65 years of age or older. The gender makeup of the city was 51.9% male and 48.1% female.

=== 2000 census ===
As of the census of 2000, there were 211 people, 99 households, and 62 families residing in the city. The population density was 385.8 inhabitants per square mile (149.0/km^{2}). There were 126 housing units at an average density of 230.4 per square mile (89.0/km^{2}). The racial makeup of the city was 98.58% White and 1.42% Native American. Hispanic or Latino people of any race were 0.47% of the population.

There were 99 households, out of which 21.2% had children under the age of 18 living with them, 53.5% were married couples living together, 8.1% had a female householder with no husband present, and 36.4% were non-families. 36.4% of all households were made up of individuals, and 26.3% had someone living alone who was 65 years of age or older. The average household size was 2.13 and the average family size was 2.75.

In the city, the population was spread out, with 23.2% under the age of 18, 1.9% from 18 to 24, 19.9% from 25 to 44, 20.4% from 45 to 64, and 34.6% who were 65 years of age or older. The median age was 50 years. For every 100 females, there were 91.8 males. For every 100 females age 18 and over, there were 100.0 males.

The median income for a household in the city was $24,250, and the median income for a family was $29,688. Males had a median income of $25,000 versus $13,333 for females. The per capita income for the city was $11,857. About 17.9% of families and 21.5% of the population were below the poverty line, including 38.9% of those under the age of eighteen and 10.1% of those 65 or over.

== Arts and culture ==
Enchanted Highway, a series of metal sculptures, is located in Regent.

The Hettinger County Historical Society Museum is located in Regent.

== Education ==
It is in the Mott/Regent School District.

== Notable people ==
- Byron Dorgan, state Tax Commissioner (1969-1980), U.S. Congressman (1981-1992), and Senator (1992-2011)
- Leonard J. Jacobs (1928-2024), member of the North Dakota House of Representatives from 1993-1998.
