= Carson, North Dakota =

- City
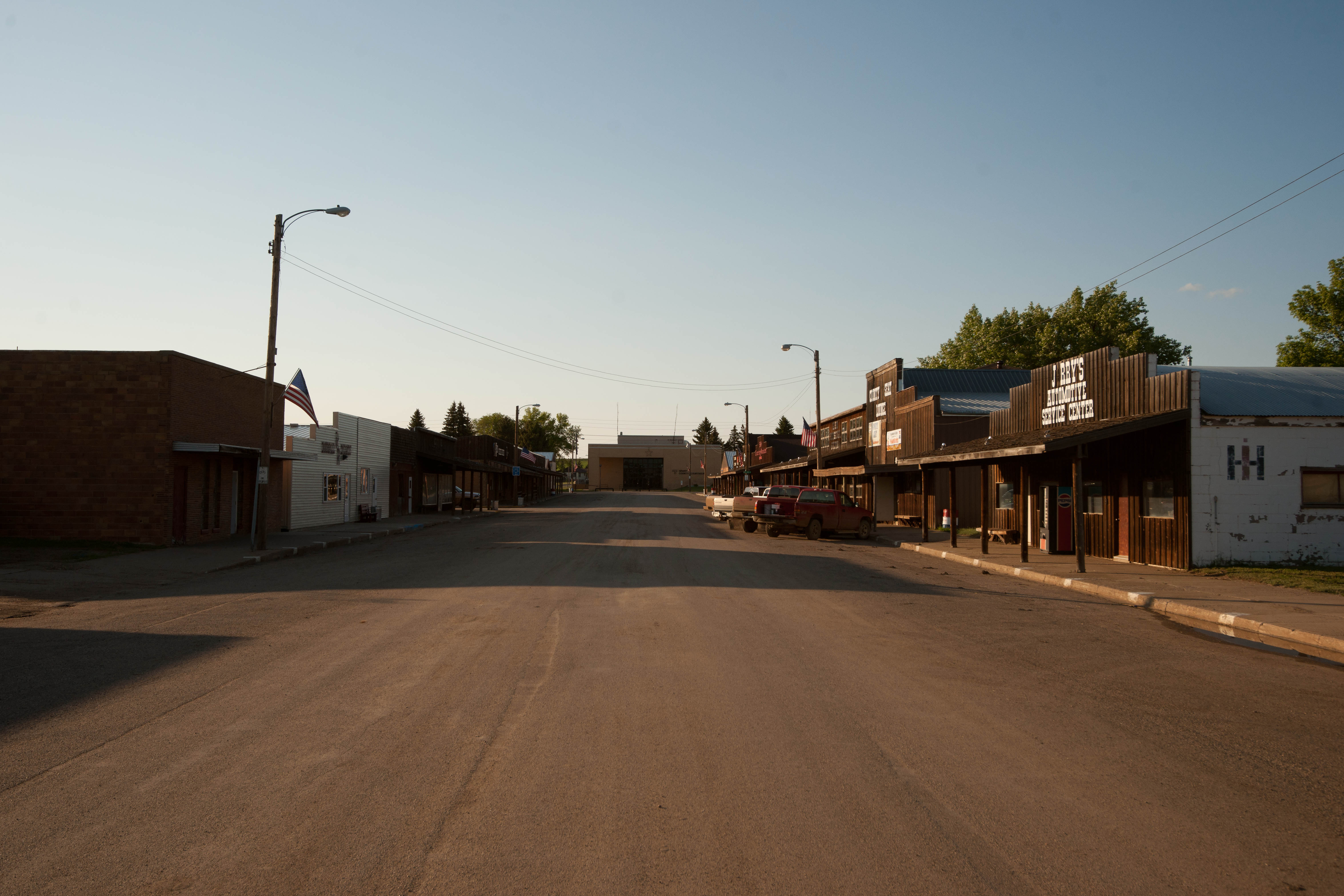
- Business District of Carson

- Location of Carson, North Dakota
- Coordinates: 46°25′20″N 101°34′14″W
- Country: United States
- State: North Dakota
- County: Grant
- Founded: 1910

Area
  - Total: 3.99 sq mi (10.34 km^{2})
  - Land: 3.99 sq mi (10.34 km^{2})
  - Water: 0 sq mi (0.00 km^{2})
- Elevation: 2,313 ft (705 m)

Population (2020)
  - Total: 254
  - Estimate (2024): 245
  - Density: 63.6/sq mi (24.57/km^{2})
- Time zone: UTC-7 (Mountain (MST))
  - Summer (DST): UTC-6 (MDT)
- ZIP code: 58529
- Area code: 701
- FIPS code: 38-12460
- GNIS feature ID: 1035956
- Website: carsonnorthdakota.com

Carson is a city in and the county seat of Grant County, North Dakota, United States. The population was 254 at the 2020 census.

== History ==
Carson was laid out in 1910 when the Northern Pacific Railway was extended to that point. The city's name is a portmanteau of the surnames of two settlers: Frank Carter and Simon Pederson.

== Geography ==
According to the United States Census Bureau, the city has a total area of 4.02 square miles (10.41 km^{2}), all land.

== Climate ==
This climatic region is typified by large seasonal temperature differences, with warm to hot summers and cold winters. According to the Köppen Climate Classification system, Carson has a humid continental climate, abbreviated "Dfb" on climate maps.

== Demographics ==
Historical population
Census	Pop.	Note	%±
1920	277		—
1930	356		28.5%
1940	473		32.9%
1950	493		4.2%
1960	501		1.6%
1970	466		−7.0%
1980	469		0.6%
1990	383		−18.3%
2000	319		−16.7%
2010	293		−8.2%
2020	254		−13.3%
2024 (est.)	245		−3.5%
U.S. Decennial Census; 2020 Census

=== 2010 census ===
As of the census of 2010, there were 293 people, 154 households, and 70 families residing in the city. The population density was 72.9 inhabitants per square mile (28.1/km^{2}). There were 194 housing units at an average density of 48.3 per square mile (18.6/km^{2}). The racial makeup of the city was 99.3% White, 0.3% Native American, and 0.3% from two or more races. Hispanic or Latino of any race were 0.7% of the population.

There were 154 households, of which 20.1% had children under the age of 18 living with them, 37.0% were married couples living together, 7.1% had a female householder with no husband present, 1.3% had a male householder with no wife present, and 54.5% were non-families. 53.2% of all households were made up of individuals, and 24.6% had someone living alone who was 65 years of age or older. The average household size was 1.90 and the average family size was 2.91.

The median age in the city was 49.1 years. 20.8% of residents were under the age of 18; 6.6% were between the ages of 18 and 24; 17% were from 25 to 44; 28% were from 45 to 64; and 27.6% were 65 years of age or older. The gender makeup of the city was 47.1% male and 52.9% female.

=== 2000 census ===
As of the census of 2000, there were 319 people, 154 households, and 83 families residing in the city. The population density was 79.4 inhabitants per square mile (30.7/km^{2}). There were 201 housing units at an average density of 50.1 per square mile (19.3/km^{2}). The racial makeup of the city was 96.87% White, 1.25% from other races, and 1.88% from two or more races. Hispanic or Latino of any race were 1.25% of the population.

There were 154 households, out of which 23.4% had children under the age of 18 living with them, 44.2% were married couples living together, 8.4% had a female householder with no husband present, and 45.5% were non-families. 44.8% of all households were made up of individuals, and 30.5% had someone living alone who was 65 years of age or older. The average household size was 2.07 and the average family size was 2.92.

In the city, the population was spread out, with 23.5% under the age of 18, 5.6% from 18 to 24, 22.6% from 25 to 44, 16.9% from 45 to 64, and 31.3% who were 65 years of age or older. The median age was 43 years. For every 100 females, there were 85.5 males. For every 100 females age 18 and over, there were 78.1 males.

The median income for a household in the city was $19,722, and the median income for a family was $23,056. Males had a median income of $16,806 versus $21,000 for females. The per capita income for the city was $11,754. About 16.3% of families and 21.7% of the population were below the poverty line, including 26.3% of those under age 18 and 19.0% of those age 65 or over.
