= Mekinock Township, North Dakota =

- Township
- Location within North Dakota
- Coordinates: 47°58′35″N 97°25′45″W
- Country: United States
- State: North Dakota
- County: Grand Forks

Area
  - Total: 36.46 sq mi (94.44 km^{2})
  - Land: 36.46 sq mi (94.44 km^{2})
  - Water: 0 sq mi (0.00 km^{2})
- Elevation: 902 ft (275 m)

Population (2020)
  - Total: 2,152
  - Density: 59.02/sq mi (22.79/km^{2})
- Time zone: UTC-6 (Central (CST))
  - Summer (DST): UTC-5 (CDT)
- ZIP codes: 58204-05 (Grand Forks AFB); 58214 (Arvilla); 58235 (Gilby); 58258 (Mekinock)
- Area code: 701
- FIPS code: 38-51980
- GNIS feature ID: 1036608

Mekinock Township is a township in central Grand Forks County, North Dakota, United States. The population was 2,152 at the 2020 census.

== Geography ==
Mekinock Township has a total area of 36.465 square miles (94.44 km^{2}), all land.

A large portion of the Grand Forks Air Force Base is located in Mekinock Township, as well as the unincorporated community of Mekinock.

=== Major highways ===
- U.S. Highway 2

== Demographics ==
As of the 2024 American Community Survey, there were an estimated 625 households with a margin of error of 91.
