= Fairfield Township, North Dakota =

- Township
- Location within North Dakota
- Coordinates: 47°48′10″N 97°18′12″W
- Country: United States
- State: North Dakota
- County: Grand Forks

Area
  - Total: 35.53 sq mi (92.03 km^{2})
  - Land: 35.51 sq mi (91.96 km^{2})
  - Water: 0.028 sq mi (0.073 km^{2})
- Elevation: 932 ft (284 m)

Population (2020)
  - Total: 116
  - Density: 3.27/sq mi (1.26/km^{2})
- Time zone: UTC-6 (Central (CST))
  - Summer (DST): UTC-5 (CDT)
- ZIP codes: 58201 (Grand Forks); 58228 (Emerado); 58267 (Northwood); 58278 (Thompson)
- Area code: 701
- FIPS code: 38-25260
- GNIS feature ID: 1036595

Fairfield Township is a township in Grand Forks County, North Dakota, United States. The population was 116 at the 2020 census.

== Geography ==
Fairfield Township has a total area of 35.534 square miles (92.03 km^{2}), of which 35.506 square miles (91.96 km^{2}) is land and 0.028 square miles (0.073 km^{2}) is water.

=== Major highways ===
- North Dakota Highway 15

== Demographics ==
As of the 2023 American Community Survey, there were an estimated 149 households.
