= Washington Township, North Dakota =

- Township
- Location within North Dakota
- Coordinates: 47°42′56″N 97°25′54″W
- Country: United States
- State: North Dakota
- County: Grand Forks

Area
  - Total: 36.04 sq mi (93.34 km^{2})
  - Land: 36.04 sq mi (93.34 km^{2})
  - Water: 0 sq mi (0.00 km^{2})
- Elevation: 1,076 ft (328 m)

Population (2020)
  - Total: 118
  - Density: 3.27/sq mi (1.26/km^{2})
- Time zone: UTC-6 (Central (CST))
  - Summer (DST): UTC-5 (CDT)
- ZIP codes: 58240 (Hatton); 58267 (Northwood)
- Area code: 701
- FIPS code: 38-83740
- GNIS feature ID: 1036588

Washington Township is a township on the southern border of Grand Forks County, North Dakota, United States. The population was 118 at the 2020 census.

== Geography ==
Washington Township has a total area of 36.037 square miles (93.34 km^{2}), all land.

=== Major highways ===
- North Dakota Highway 15
- North Dakota Highway 18

== Demographics ==
As of the 2024 American Community Survey, there were an estimated 42 households with a margin of error of 17.
