= Pleasant View Township, North Dakota =

- Township
- Location within North Dakota
- Coordinates: 47°48′09″N 97°25′50″W
- Country: United States
- State: North Dakota
- County: Grand Forks

Area
  - Total: 36.05 sq mi (93.38 km^{2})
  - Land: 36.05 sq mi (93.38 km^{2})
  - Water: 0.001 sq mi (0.0026 km^{2})
- Elevation: 1,037 ft (316 m)

Population (2020)
  - Total: 142
  - Density: 3.94/sq mi (1.52/km^{2})
- Time zone: UTC-6 (Central (CST))
  - Summer (DST): UTC-5 (CDT)
- ZIP codes: 58214 (Arvilla); 58228 (Emerado); 58267 (Northwood)
- Area code: 701
- FIPS code: 38-63300
- GNIS feature ID: 1036596

Pleasant View Township is a township in southern Grand Forks County, North Dakota, United States. The population was 142 at the 2020 census.

== Geography ==
Pleasant View Township has a total area of 36.054 square miles (93.38 km^{2}), of which 36.053 square miles (93.38 km^{2}) is land and 0.001 square miles (0.0026 km^{2}) is water.

== Demographics ==
As of the 2024 American Community Survey, there were an estimated 33 households with a margin of error of 15.
