= Kellys Slough National Wildlife Refuge =

- IUCN category IV (habitat/species management area)
- Location within the United States
- Location: Grand Forks County, North Dakota, United States
- Nearest city: Emerado, North Dakota
- Coordinates: 47.97248°N 97.27758°W
- Area: 1,270 acres (5.1 km^{2})
- Established: 1936
- Governing body: U.S. Fish and Wildlife Service
- Website: Kellys Slough National Wildlife Refuge

Kellys Slough National Wildlife Refuge was established to develop and manage a system of wetlands and grasslands that is unique to the Red River Valley. The Refuge supports a diversity of wetland and grassland wildlife, while providing for wildlife-dependent recreation, interpretation, and education. Kellys Slough National Wildlife Refuge is located in the heart of the Red River Valley. The Refuge contains an intermittent stream that flows into the Turtle River, a tributary of the Red River. The Refuge covers portions of Blooming, Lakeville and Rye Townships of Grand Forks County.

The refuge was established in 1936 and contains a total of 1,270 acres (5.1 km^{2}).
