= Hegton Township, North Dakota =

- Township
- Location within North Dakota
- Coordinates: 47°58′34″N 97°33′33″W
- Country: United States
- State: North Dakota
- County: Grand Forks

Area
  - Total: 36.54 sq mi (94.63 km^{2})
  - Land: 36.42 sq mi (94.33 km^{2})
  - Water: 0.12 sq mi (0.30 km^{2})
- Elevation: 1,024 ft (312 m)

Population (2020)
  - Total: 208
  - Density: 5.71/sq mi (2.21/km^{2})
- Time zone: UTC-6 (Central (CST))
  - Summer (DST): UTC-5 (CDT)
- ZIP codes: 58214 (Arvilla); 58251 (Larimore)
- Area code: 701
- FIPS code: 38-36940
- GNIS feature ID: 1036610

Hegton Township is a township in Grand Forks County, North Dakota, United States. The population was 208 at the 2020 census.

It was named after Hegton, a former settlement within the township founded by Hans E. Hanson, a pioneer from Norway.

== Geography ==
Hegton Township has a total area of 36.536 square miles (94.63 km^{2}), of which 36.420 square miles (94.33 km^{2}) is land and 0.116 square miles (0.30 km^{2}) is water.

=== Major highways ===
- U.S. Highway 2

== Demographics ==
As of the 2023 American Community Survey, there were an estimated 115 households.
