= Lind Township, North Dakota =

- Township
- Location within North Dakota
- Coordinates: 47°42′57″N 97°41′19″W
- Country: United States
- State: North Dakota
- County: Grand Forks

Area
  - Total: 36.16 sq mi (93.65 km^{2})
  - Land: 36.11 sq mi (93.53 km^{2})
  - Water: 0.046 sq mi (0.12 km^{2})
- Elevation: 1,180 ft (360 m)

Population (2020)
  - Total: 66
  - Density: 1.8/sq mi (0.71/km^{2})
- Time zone: UTC-6 (Central (CST))
  - Summer (DST): UTC-5 (CDT)
- ZIP code: 58267 (Northwood)
- Area code: 701
- FIPS code: 38-46820
- GNIS feature ID: 1036590

Lind Township is a township in southern Grand Forks County, North Dakota, United States. The population was 66 at the 2020 census.

== Geography ==
Lind Township has a total area of 36.158 square miles (93.65 km^{2}), of which 36.111 square miles (93.53 km^{2}) is land and 0.047 square miles (0.12 km^{2}) is water.

=== Major highways ===
- North Dakota Highway 15
- North Dakota Highway 18

== Demographics ==
As of the 2024 American Community Survey, there were an estimated 10 households.
