= Wheatfield Township, North Dakota =

- Township
- Location within North Dakota
- Coordinates: 48°03′51″N 97°34′45″W
- Country: United States
- State: North Dakota
- County: Grand Forks

Area
  - Total: 36.14 sq mi (93.59 km^{2})
  - Land: 36.14 sq mi (93.59 km^{2})
  - Water: 0 sq mi (0.00 km^{2})
- Elevation: 971 ft (296 m)

Population (2020)
  - Total: 80
  - Density: 2.2/sq mi (0.85/km^{2})
- Time zone: UTC-6 (Central (CST))
  - Summer (DST): UTC-5 (CDT)
- ZIP codes: 58235 (Gilby); 58244 (Inkster); 58251 (Larimore)
- Area code: 701
- FIPS code: 38-85140
- GNIS feature ID: 1036619

Wheatfield Township is a township in Grand Forks County, North Dakota, United States. The population was 80 at the 2020 census.

== Geography ==
Wheatfield Township has a total area of 36.137 square miles (93.59 km^{2}), all land.

=== Major highways ===
- North Dakota Highway 18

== Demographics ==
As of the 2023 American Community Survey, there were an estimated 35 households with a margin of error of 14.
