= Chester Township, North Dakota =

- Township
- Location within North Dakota
- Coordinates: 47°53′22″N 97°25′47″W
- Country: United States
- State: North Dakota
- County: Grand Forks

Area
  - Total: 36.15 sq mi (93.62 km^{2})
  - Land: 36.15 sq mi (93.62 km^{2})
  - Water: 0 sq mi (0.00 km^{2})
- Elevation: 965 ft (294 m)

Population (2020)
  - Total: 152
  - Density: 4.21/sq mi (1.62/km^{2})
- Time zone: UTC-6 (Central (CST))
  - Summer (DST): UTC-5 (CDT)
- ZIP codes: 58214 (Arvilla); 58228 (Emerado)
- Area code: 701
- FIPS code: 38-13860
- GNIS feature ID: 1036607

Chester Township is a township in Grand Forks County, North Dakota, United States. The population was 152 at the 2020 census.

The township was possibly named after former U.S. president Chester A. Arthur.

== Geography ==
Chester Township has a total area of 36.145 square miles (93.62 km^{2}), all land.

=== Major highways ===
- U.S. Highway 2

== Demographics ==
As of the 2023 American Community Survey, there were an estimated 40 households.
