= Niagara Township, North Dakota =

- Township
- Location within North Dakota
- Coordinates: 47°58′36″N 97°49′05″W
- Country: United States
- State: North Dakota
- County: Grand Forks

Area
  - Total: 35.21 sq mi (91.19 km^{2})
  - Land: 35.16 sq mi (91.06 km^{2})
  - Water: 0.050 sq mi (0.13 km^{2})
- Elevation: 1,365 ft (416 m)

Population (2020)
  - Total: 66
  - Density: 1.9/sq mi (0.72/km^{2})
- Time zone: UTC-6 (Central (CST))
  - Summer (DST): UTC-5 (CDT)
- ZIP codes: 58251 (Larimore); 58266 (Niagara)
- Area code: 701
- FIPS code: 38-56820
- GNIS feature ID: 1036615

Niagara Township is a township in Grand Forks County, North Dakota, United States. The population was 66 at the 2020 census.

== Geography ==
Niagara Township has a total area of 35.209 square miles (91.19 km^{2}), of which 35.158 square miles (91.06 km^{2}) is land and 0.051 square miles (0.13 km^{2}) is water. It borders the western side of the city of Niagara.

=== Major highways ===
- U.S. Highway 2
- North Dakota Highway 32

== Demographics ==
As of the 2024 American Community Survey, there were an estimated 15 households.
