= Grace Township, North Dakota =

- Township
- Location within North Dakota
- Coordinates: 47°48′09″N 97°41′17″W
- Country: United States
- State: North Dakota
- County: Grand Forks

Area
  - Total: 36.40 sq mi (94.27 km^{2})
  - Land: 36.38 sq mi (94.22 km^{2})
  - Water: 0.017 sq mi (0.044 km^{2})
- Elevation: 1,165 ft (355 m)

Population (2020)
  - Total: 98
  - Density: 2.7/sq mi (1.0/km^{2})
- Time zone: UTC-6 (Central (CST))
  - Summer (DST): UTC-5 (CDT)
- ZIP codes: 58251 (Larimore); 58267 (Northwood)
- Area code: 701
- FIPS code: 38-31700
- GNIS feature ID: 1036598

Grace Township is a township in southwestern Grand Forks County, North Dakota, United States. The population was 98 at the 2020 census.

== Geography ==
Grace Township has a total area of 36.396 square miles (94.27 km^{2}), of which 36.379 square miles (94.22 km^{2}) is land and 0.017 square miles (0.044 km^{2}) is water.

=== Major highways ===
- North Dakota Highway 18

== Demographics ==
As of the 2023 American Community Survey, there were an estimated 16 households.
