= Northwood Township, North Dakota =

- Township
- Location within North Dakota
- Coordinates: 47°42′56″N 97°33′36″W
- Country: United States
- State: North Dakota
- County: Grand Forks

Area
  - Total: 34.58 sq mi (89.55 km^{2})
  - Land: 34.58 sq mi (89.55 km^{2})
  - Water: 0 sq mi (0.00 km^{2})
- Elevation: 1,112 ft (339 m)

Population (2020)
  - Total: 127
  - Density: 3.67/sq mi (1.42/km^{2})
- Time zone: UTC-6 (Central (CST))
  - Summer (DST): UTC-5 (CDT)
- ZIP codes: 58240 (Hatton); 58267 (Northwood)
- Area code: 701
- FIPS code: 38-58340
- GNIS feature ID: 1036589

Northwood Township is a township in southern Grand Forks County, North Dakota, United States. The population was 127 at the 2020 census.

== Geography ==
Northwood Township has a total area of 34.574 square miles (89.55 km^{2}), all land.

The township completely surrounds the city of Northwood.

=== Major highways ===
- North Dakota Highway 15
- North Dakota Highway 18

== Demographics ==
As of the 2024 American Community Survey, there were an estimated 34 households with a margin of error of 16.
