= Walle Township, North Dakota =

- Township
- Location within North Dakota
- Coordinates: 47°48′10″N 97°02′43″W
- Country: United States
- State: North Dakota
- County: Grand Forks
- Named for: Valle Municipality, Norway

Area
  - Total: 38.88 sq mi (100.71 km^{2})
  - Land: 38.69 sq mi (100.20 km^{2})
  - Water: 0.20 sq mi (0.51 km^{2})
- Elevation: 846 ft (258 m)

Population (2020)
  - Total: 515
  - Density: 13.3/sq mi (5.14/km^{2})
- Time zone: UTC-6 (Central (CST))
  - Summer (DST): UTC-5 (CDT)
- ZIP codes: 58201 (Grand Forks); 58278 (Thompson)
- Area code: 701
- FIPS code: 38-83140
- GNIS feature ID: 1036592

Walle Township is a township in Grand Forks County, North Dakota, United States. The population was 515 at the 2020 census.

It borders Minnesota to its east.

== History ==
The township was named after Valle Municipality in Norway by Olav N. Loiland and his siblings, the township's first permanent settlers.

== Geography ==
Walle Township has a total area of 38.884 square miles (100.71 km^{2}), of which 38.688 square miles (100.20 km^{2}) is land and 0.196 square miles (0.51 km^{2}) is water.

=== Major highways ===
- Interstate 29
- U.S. Highway 81
- North Dakota Highway 15

== Demographics ==
As of the 2023 American Community Survey, there were an estimated 112 households.
