= Oakville Township, North Dakota =

Township in Grand Forks County, North Dakota

- Township
- Location within North Dakota
- Coordinates: 47°53′25″N 97°18′14″W
- Country: United States
- State: North Dakota
- County: Grand Forks

Area
  - Total: 35.11 sq mi (90.93 km^{2})
  - Land: 35.04 sq mi (90.75 km^{2})
  - Water: 0.069 sq mi (0.18 km^{2})
- Elevation: 879 ft (268 m)

Population (2020)
  - Total: 192
  - Density: 5.48/sq mi (2.12/km^{2})
- Time zone: UTC-6 (Central (CST))
  - Summer (DST): UTC-5 (CDT)
- ZIP code: 58228 (Emerado)
- Area code: 701
- FIPS code: 38-58900
- GNIS feature ID: 1036604

Oakville Township is a township in Grand Forks County, North Dakota, United States. The population was 192 at the 2020 census.

== Geography ==
Oakville Township has a total area of 35.108 square miles (90.93 km^{2}), of which 35.039 square miles (90.75 km^{2}) is land and 0.069 square miles (0.18 km^{2}) is water.

=== Major highways ===
- U.S. Highway 2

=== Airports ===
- Gorman Field

== Demographics ==
As of the 2024 American Community Survey, there were an estimated 70 households with a margin of error of 44.
