= Plymouth Township, North Dakota =

- Township
- Location within North Dakota
- Coordinates: 48°03′52″N 97°50′19″W
- Country: United States
- State: North Dakota
- County: Grand Forks

Area
  - Total: 36.08 sq mi (93.45 km^{2})
  - Land: 36.02 sq mi (93.29 km^{2})
  - Water: 0.062 sq mi (0.16 km^{2})
- Elevation: 1,316 ft (401 m)

Population (2020)
  - Total: 68
  - Density: 1.9/sq mi (0.73/km^{2})
- Time zone: UTC-6 (Central (CST))
  - Summer (DST): UTC-5 (CDT)
- ZIP codes: 58231 (Fordville); 58251 (Larimore); 58266 (Niagara)
- Area code: 701
- FIPS code: 38-63380
- GNIS feature ID: 1036621

Plymouth Township is a township in Grand Forks County, North Dakota, United States. The population was 68 at the 2020 census.

== Geography ==
Plymouth Township has a total area of 36.082 square miles (93.45 km^{2}), of which 36.020 square miles (93.29 km^{2}) is land and 0.062 square miles (0.16 km^{2}) is water.

=== Major highways ===
- North Dakota Highway 32

== Demographics ==
As of the 2023 American Community Survey, there were an estimated 14 households.
