= Loretta Township, North Dakota =

- Township
- Location within North Dakota
- Coordinates: 47°42′57″N 97°49′05″W
- Country: United States
- State: North Dakota
- County: Grand Forks

Area
  - Total: 36.13 sq mi (93.57 km^{2})
  - Land: 36.13 sq mi (93.57 km^{2})
  - Water: 0 sq mi (0.00 km^{2})
- Elevation: 1,424 ft (434 m)

Population (2020)
  - Total: 48
  - Density: 1.3/sq mi (0.51/km^{2})
- Time zone: UTC-6 (Central (CST))
  - Summer (DST): UTC-5 (CDT)
- ZIP codes: 58212 (Aneta); 58267 (Northwood)
- Area code: 701
- FIPS code: 38-48100
- GNIS feature ID: 1036591

Loretta Township is a township in the southwestern corner of Grand Forks County, North Dakota, United States. The population was 48 at the 2020 census.

== Geography ==
Loretta Township has a total area of 36.128 square miles (93.57 km^{2}), all land.

=== Major highways ===
- North Dakota Highway 15

== Demographics ==
As of the 2024 American Community Survey, there were an estimated 16 households with a margin of error of 11.
