= Moraine Township, North Dakota =

- Township
- Location within North Dakota
- Coordinates: 47°53′23″N 97°49′06″W
- Country: United States
- State: North Dakota
- County: Grand Forks

Area
  - Total: 35.93 sq mi (93.05 km^{2})
  - Land: 35.89 sq mi (92.96 km^{2})
  - Water: 0.035 sq mi (0.091 km^{2})
- Elevation: 1,394 ft (425 m)

Population (2020)
  - Total: 73
  - Density: 2.0/sq mi (0.79/km^{2})
- Time zone: UTC-6 (Central (CST))
  - Summer (DST): UTC-5 (CDT)
- ZIP codes: 58251 (Larimore); 58266 (Niagara)
- Area code: 701
- FIPS code: 38-54300
- GNIS feature ID: 1036614

Moraine Township is a township in Grand Forks County, North Dakota, United States. The population was 43 at the 2020 census.

== Geography ==
Moraine Township has a total area of 35.926 square miles (93.05 km^{2}), of which 35.891 square miles (92.96 km^{2}) is land and 0.035 square miles (0.091 km^{2}) is water.

== Demographics ==
As of the 2024 American Community Survey, there were an estimated 43 households.
