= Allendale Township, Grand Forks County, North Dakota =

Coordinates: 47°48′N 97°11′W

Allendale Township is a township in Grand Forks County, North Dakota, United States. It has a population of 368 people with a population density of ten people per square mile.

== Geography ==
The city of Thompson is located on its eastern border with adjacent Walle Township.

=== Major highways ===
- North Dakota Highway 15
