= Lakeville Township, North Dakota =

- Township
- Location within North Dakota
- Coordinates: 48°03′49″N 97°19′11″W
- Country: United States
- State: North Dakota
- County: Grand Forks

Area
  - Total: 35.95 sq mi (93.11 km^{2})
  - Land: 35.48 sq mi (91.88 km^{2})
  - Water: 0.47 sq mi (1.23 km^{2})
- Elevation: 837 ft (255 m)

Population (2020)
  - Total: 85
  - Density: 2.4/sq mi (0.93/km^{2})
- Time zone: UTC-6 (Central (CST))
  - Summer (DST): UTC-5 (CDT)
- ZIP codes: 58256 (Manvel); 58258 (Mekinock); 58261 (Minto)
- Area code: 701
- FIPS code: 38-44060
- GNIS feature ID: 1036617

Lakeville Township is a township in Grand Forks County, North Dakota, United States. The population was 85 at the 2020 census.

== Geography ==
Lakeville Township has a total area of 35.950 square miles (93.11 km^{2}), of which 35.475 square miles (91.88 km^{2}) is land and 0.475 square miles (1.23 km^{2}) is water.

== Demographics ==
As of the 2023 American Community Survey, there were an estimated 93 households with a margin of error of 72.
