= Ferry Township, North Dakota =

- Township
- Location within North Dakota
- Coordinates: 48°03′47″N 97°10′12″W
- Country: United States
- State: North Dakota
- County: Grand Forks

Area
  - Total: 46.19 sq mi (119.62 km^{2})
  - Land: 45.99 sq mi (119.12 km^{2})
  - Water: 0.19 sq mi (0.49 km^{2})
- Elevation: 823 ft (251 m)

Population (2020)
  - Total: 345
  - Density: 7.50/sq mi (2.90/km^{2})
- Time zone: UTC-6 (Central (CST))
  - Summer (DST): UTC-5 (CDT)
- ZIP codes: 58203 (Grand Forks); 58256 (Manvel)
- Area code: 701
- FIPS code: 38-26020
- GNIS feature ID: 1036616

Ferry Township is a township in Grand Forks County, North Dakota, United States. The population was 345 at the 2020 census. The township borders Minnesota to its east.

== Geography ==
Ferry Township has a total area of 46.184 square miles (119.62 km^{2}), of which 45.994 square miles (119.12 km^{2}) is land and 0.190 square miles (0.49 km^{2}) is water.

The township surrounds the city of Manvel.

=== Major highways ===
- Interstate 29
- U.S. Highway 81

== Demographics ==
As of the 2023 American Community Survey, there were an estimated 120 households.
