= Gilby Township, North Dakota =

- Township
- Location within North Dakota
- Coordinates: 48°03′51″N 97°26′58″W
- Country: United States
- State: North Dakota
- County: Grand Forks

Area
  - Total: 36.04 sq mi (93.35 km^{2})
  - Land: 36.04 sq mi (93.35 km^{2})
  - Water: 0 sq mi (0.00 km^{2})
- Elevation: 876 ft (267 m)

Population (2020)
  - Total: 62
  - Density: 1.7/sq mi (0.66/km^{2})
- Time zone: UTC-6 (Central (CST))
  - Summer (DST): UTC-5 (CDT)
- ZIP code: 58235 (Gilby)
- Area code: 701
- FIPS code: 38-30220
- GNIS feature ID: 1036618

Gilby Township is a township in Grand Forks County, North Dakota, United States. The population was 62 at the 2020 census.

It gets its name from the city of Gilby, which in turn was named after settler John Gilby Jr.

== Geography ==
Gilby Township has a total area of 36.042 square miles (93.35 km^{2}), all land.

It surrounds the city of Gilby and contains the unincorporated community of Honeyford.

== Demographics ==
As of the 2023 American Community Survey, there were an estimated 40 households.
