= Larimore Township, North Dakota =

- Township
- Location within North Dakota
- Coordinates: 47°53′22″N 97°41′18″W
- Country: United States
- State: North Dakota
- County: Grand Forks
- Named for: Larimore

Area
  - Total: 35.83 sq mi (92.79 km^{2})
  - Land: 35.81 sq mi (92.75 km^{2})
  - Water: 0.016 sq mi (0.041 km^{2})
- Elevation: 1,132 ft (345 m)

Population (2020)
  - Total: 113
  - Density: 3.16/sq mi (1.22/km^{2})
- Time zone: UTC-6 (Central (CST))
  - Summer (DST): UTC-5 (CDT)
- ZIP code: 58251 (Larimore)
- Area code: 701
- FIPS code: 38-45060
- GNIS feature ID: 1036612

Larimore Township is a township in Grand Forks County, North Dakota, United States. The population was 113 at the 2020 census.

The township was named after the city of the same name, of which the former partially surrounds.

== Geography ==
Larimore Township has a total area of 35.826 square miles (92.79 km^{2}), of which 35.810 square miles (92.75 km^{2}) is land and 0.016 square miles (0.041 km^{2}) is water.

== Demographics ==
As of the 2023 American Community Survey, there were an estimated 68 households with a margin of error of 53.
