= Arvilla Township, Grand Forks County, North Dakota =

Township in North Dakota, U.S.

Coordinates: 47°53′21″N 97°33′32″E

Arvilla Township is a township in Grand Forks County, North Dakota, United States. It has a population of 334 people with a population density of 9 inhabitants per square mile (3.5/km^{2}).

The unincorporated community of Arvilla lies mostly within Arvilla Township.

== Geography ==
=== Major highways ===
- U.S. Highway 2
