= Turtle River Township, North Dakota =

- Township
- Location within North Dakota
- Coordinates: 48°08′59″N 97°11′27″W
- Country: United States
- State: North Dakota
- County: Grand Forks

Area
  - Total: 33.54 sq mi (86.87 km^{2})
  - Land: 33.27 sq mi (86.16 km^{2})
  - Water: 0.27 sq mi (0.7 km^{2})
- Elevation: 814 ft (248 m)

Population (2020)
  - Total: 163
  - Density: 4.90/sq mi (1.89/km^{2})
- Time zone: UTC-6 (Central (CST))
  - Summer (DST): UTC-5 (CDT)
- ZIP codes: 58256 (Manvel); 58261 (Minto); 56744 (Oslo)
- Area code: 701
- FIPS code: 38-80060
- GNIS feature ID: 1036622

Turtle River Township is a township located in the northeastern-most corner of Grand Forks County, North Dakota, United States. The population was 163 at the 2020 census. The township borders Minnesota to its east.

It was named after the river that flows through it.

== Geography ==
Turtle River Township has a total area of 33.539 square miles (86.87 km^{2}), of which 33.268 square miles (86.16 km^{2}) is land and 0.271 square miles (0.70 km^{2}) is water.

=== Major highways ===
- Interstate 29
- U.S. Highway 81

== Demographics ==
As of the 2023 American Community Survey, there were an estimated 50 households.
