= Levant Township, North Dakota =

- Township
- Location within North Dakota
- Coordinates: 48°09′03″N 97°19′10″W
- Country: United States
- State: North Dakota
- County: Grand Forks

Area
  - Total: 35.94 sq mi (93.09 km^{2})
  - Land: 35.94 sq mi (93.09 km^{2})
  - Water: 0 sq mi (0.00 km^{2})
- Elevation: 830 ft (253 m)

Population (2020)
  - Total: 70
  - Density: 1.9/sq mi (0.75/km^{2})
- Time zone: UTC-6 (Central (CST))
  - Summer (DST): UTC-5 (CDT)
- ZIP codes: 58256 (Manvel); 58261 (Minto)
- Area code: 701
- FIPS code: 38-46180
- GNIS feature ID: 1036623

Levant Township is a township in Grand Forks County, North Dakota, United States. The population was 70 at the 2020 census.

== History ==
The township was supposedly named after a former settlement in Ontario, Canada, itself named for the region in the Middle East.

== Geography ==
Levant Township has a total area of 35.941 square miles (93.09 km^{2}), all land.

=== Major highways ===
- U.S. Highway 81

== Demographics ==
As of the 2023 American Community Survey, there were an estimated 40 households with a margin of error of 18.
