= Inkster Township, North Dakota =

- Township
- Location within North Dakota
- Coordinates: 48°09′05″N 97°42′33″W
- Country: United States
- State: North Dakota
- County: Grand Forks

Area
  - Total: 35.60 sq mi (92.20 km^{2})
  - Land: 35.42 sq mi (91.75 km^{2})
  - Water: 0.17 sq mi (0.45 km^{2})
- Elevation: 1,132 ft (345 m)

Population (2020)
  - Total: 204
  - Density: 5.76/sq mi (2.22/km^{2})
- Time zone: UTC-6 (Central (CST))
  - Summer (DST): UTC-5 (CDT)
- ZIP codes: 58231 (Fordville); 58233 (Forest River; 58244 (Inkster); 58266 (Niagara)
- Area code: 701
- FIPS code: 38-40020
- GNIS feature ID: 1036626

Inkster Township is a township in Grand Forks County, North Dakota, United States. The population was 204 at the 2020 census.

It was named after the North Dakota city of the same name.

== Geography ==
Inkster Township has a total area of 35.599 square miles (92.20 km^{2}), of which 35.426 square miles (91.75 km^{2}) is land and 0.173 square miles (0.45 km^{2}) is water.

== Demographics ==
As of the 2023 American Community Survey, there were an estimated 10 households with a margin of error of 7.
