= Michigan Township, Grand Forks County, North Dakota =

Michigan Township, North Dakota
- Township
- Location within North Dakota
- Coordinates: 47°42′36″N 97°10′28″W
- Country: United States
- State: North Dakota
- County: Grand Forks

Area
  - Total: 36.16 sq mi (93.66 km^{2})
  - Land: 36.15 sq mi (93.62 km^{2})
  - Water: 0.016 sq mi (0.041 km^{2})
- Elevation: 863 ft (263 m)

Population (2020)
  - Total: 128
  - Density: 3.54/sq mi (1.37/km^{2})
- Time zone: UTC-6 (Central (CST))
  - Summer (DST): UTC-5 (CDT)
- ZIP codes: 58275 (Reynolds); 58278 (Thompson)
- Area code: 701
- FIPS code: 38-52620
- GNIS feature ID: 1036586

Michigan Township is a township in Grand Forks County, North Dakota, United States. The population was 128 at the 2020 census.

== Geography ==
Michigan Township has a total area of 36.164 square miles (93.66 km^{2}), of which 36.148 square miles (93.62 km^{2}) is land and 0.016 square miles (0.041 km^{2}) is water.

== Demographics ==
As of the 2023 American Community Survey, there were an estimated 72 households with a margin of error of 31.
