= Bentru Township, North Dakota =

- Township
- Location within North Dakota
- Coordinates: 47°42′57″N 96°56′16″W
- Country: United States
- State: North Dakota
- Counties: Grand Forks
- Settled: 1871

Area
  - Total: 17.61 sq mi (45.61 km^{2})
  - Land: 17.60 sq mi (45.58 km^{2})
  - Water: 0.13 sq mi (0.34 km^{2})
- Elevation: 853 ft (260 m)

Population (2020)
  - Total: 64
  - Density: 3.6/sq mi (1.4/km^{2})
- Time zone: UTC-6 (Central (CST))
  - Summer (DST): UTC-5 (CDT)
- ZIP codes: 58275 (Reynolds); 58278 (Thompson)
- Area code: 701
- FIPS code: 38-06100
- GNIS feature ID: 1036584

Bentru Township is a township in the southeastern corner of Grand Forks County, North Dakota, United States. The population was 64 at the 2020 census.

== History ==
Bentru Township was named after Halver Hanson Bentru, a settler who arrived with his family from Iowa in 1871.

== Geography ==
Bentru Township has a total area of 17.612 square miles (45.61 km^{2}), of which 17.599 square miles (45.58 km^{2}) is land and 0.13 square miles (0.34 km^{2}) is water.
