= Grand Forks County, North Dakota =

County in North Dakota, United States

- County
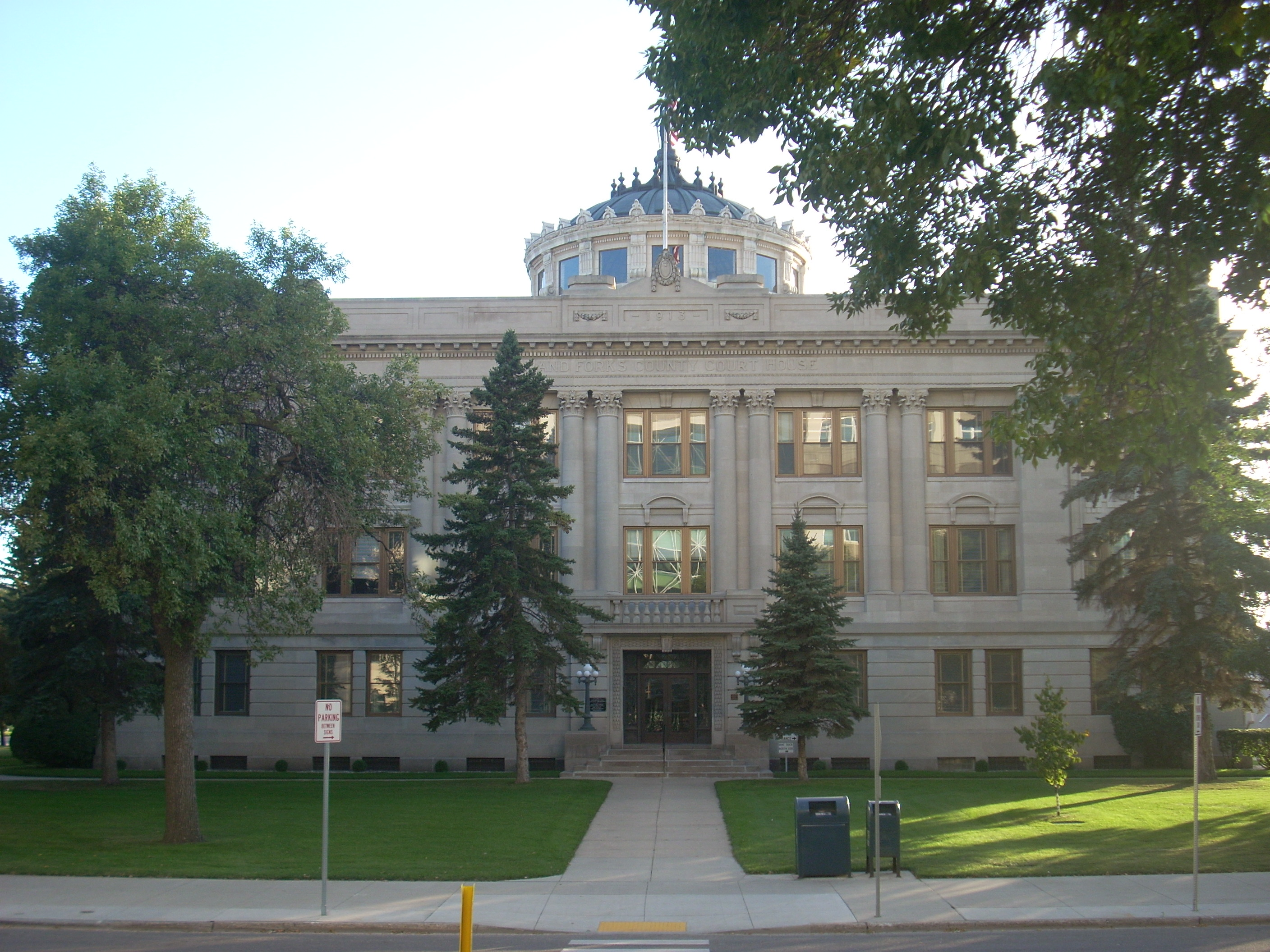
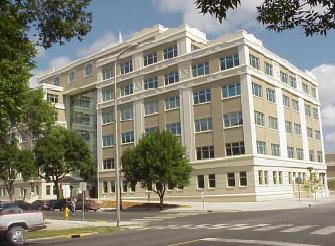
- The Grand Forks County Courthouse in Grand Forks The new Grand Forks County Office Building in Grand Forks, near historic Grand Forks County Courthouse

- Logo
- Motto: "Heart of the Red River Valley"
- Location within the U.S. state of North Dakota
- Coordinates: 47.9260°N 97.4509°W
- Country: United States
- State: North Dakota
- Founded: January 4, 1873 (created); March 2, 1875 (organized)
- Seat: Grand Forks
- Largest city: Grand Forks

Area
  - Total: 1,439.418 sq mi (3,728.08 km^{2})
  - Land: 1,436.216 sq mi (3,719.78 km^{2})
  - Water: 3.202 sq mi (8.29 km^{2}) 0.22%

Population (2020)
  - Total: 73,170
  - Estimate (2025): 74,501 ▲
  - Density: 50.95/sq mi (19.67/km^{2})
- Time zone: UTC−6 (Central)
  - Summer (DST): UTC−5 (CDT)
- Area code: 701
- Congressional district: At-large
- Website: gfcounty.nd.gov

Grand Forks County is a county in the U.S. state of North Dakota. As of the 2020 census, the population was 73,170, and was estimated to be 74,501 in 2025, making it the third-most populous county in North Dakota. The county seat and the largest city is Grand Forks.

Grand Forks County is included in the Grand Forks Metropolitan statistical area, aka Greater Grand Forks or Grand Cities area, with its core cities being Grand Forks ND and East Grand Forks MN.

== History ==
Using territory annexed from Pembina County, the Dakota Territory legislature created Grand Forks County on January 4, 1873. Its governing structure was not established at that time, nor was the territory attached to another county for administrative and judicial purposes. The government was organized on March 2, 1875.

The county's boundaries were altered in 1875, 1881, and 1883. It has retained its present boundary since 1883.

Grand Forks County is included in the Greater Grand Forks (officially the Grand Forks, ND-MN Metropolitan Statistical Area).

== Geography ==
According to the United States Census Bureau, the county has a total area of 1,439.418 square miles (3,728.08 km^{2}), of which 1,436.216 square miles (3,719.78 km^{2}) is land and 3.202 square miles (8.29 km^{2}) (0.22%) is water. It is the 17th largest county in North Dakota by total area.

Grand Forks County lies on the east side of North Dakota. Its eastern boundary line abuts the west boundary line of the state of Minnesota (across the Red River). The Red River flows northward along the county's east border, on its way to Lake Winnipeg and Hudson Bay. The Forest River flows eastward and northward across the upper western part of the county.

The terrain of Grand Forks County consists of low rolling hills, devoted to agriculture except around urban areas. The terrain slopes to the north and east; its highest point is a hill at its southwestern corner, at 1,450 ft (440 m) ASL.

The University of North Dakota has established a Field Biology Station on Forest River, at the county's northern border. In 2013 it partnered with ND Game & Fish Department to establish a 160-acre (0.65 km^{2}) wildlife management area at the station, to monitor whitetail deer activity in the forest. The field station is tasked with identifying plants native and endemic to the area. A total of 498 plants have been collected at the Forest River Biology Station and Wildlife Management Area.

=== Major highways ===
- Interstate 29
- U.S. Highway 2
- U.S. Highway 81
- North Dakota Highway 15
- North Dakota Highway 18
- North Dakota Highway 32

=== Transit ===
- Amtrak Empire Builder (Grand Forks station)
- Cities Area Transit
- Jefferson Lines

=== Adjacent counties ===
- Walsh County - north
- Marshall County, Minnesota - northeast
- Polk County, Minnesota - east
- Traill County - southeast
- Steele County - southwest
- Nelson County - west

=== Protected areas ===
- Forest River Biology Station/Wildlife Management Area
- Grand Forks County Larimore Dam Recreation Area
- Kellys Slough National Wildlife Refuge
- Little Goose National Wildlife Refuge
- Prairie Chicken State Game Management Area
- Turtle River State Park

=== Lakes ===
- Fordville Dam
- Larimore Dam
- Smith Lakes

== Demographics ==
Historical population
| Census | Pop. | Note | %± |
|---|---|---|---|
| 1880 | 6,248 | | — |
| 1890 | 18,357 | | 193.8% |
| 1900 | 24,459 | | 33.2% |
| 1910 | 27,888 | | 14.0% |
| 1920 | 28,795 | | 3.3% |
| 1930 | 31,956 | | 11.0% |
| 1940 | 34,518 | | 8.0% |
| 1950 | 39,448 | | 14.3% |
| 1960 | 48,677 | | 23.4% |
| 1970 | 61,102 | | 25.5% |
| 1980 | 66,100 | | 8.2% |
| 1990 | 70,683 | | 6.9% |
| 2000 | 66,109 | | −6.5% |
| 2010 | 66,861 | | 1.1% |
| 2020 | 73,170 | | 9.4% |
| 2025 (est.) | 74,501 | ▲ | 1.8% |
U.S. Decennial Census; 1790–1960 1900–1990; 1990–2000 2010–2020

As of the third quarter of 2025, the median home value in Grand Forks County was $285,814.

As of the 2024 American Community Survey, there are 32,955 estimated households in Grand Forks County with an average of 2.08 persons per household. The county has a median household income of $67,290. Approximately 12.5% of the county's population lives at or below the poverty line. Grand Forks County has an estimated 68.8% employment rate, with 40.7% of the population holding a bachelor's degree or higher and 96.5% holding a high school diploma. There were 34,141 housing units at an average density of 23.77 per square mile (9.2/km^{2}).

The median age in the county was 31.6 years.

Grand Forks County, North Dakota – racial and ethnic composition Note: the US Census treats Hispanic/Latino as an ethnic category. This table excludes Latinos from the racial categories and assigns them to a separate category. Hispanics/Latinos may be of any race.
| Race / ethnicity (NH = non-Hispanic) | Pop. 1980 | Pop. 1990 | Pop. 2000 | Pop. 2010 | Pop. 2020 | Pop. 2024 |
|---|---|---|---|---|---|---|
| White alone (NH) | 62,524 (94.59%) | 66,128 (93.56%) | 60,801 (91.97%) | 59,271 (88.65%) | 58,755 (80.30%) | 60,212 (81.62%) |
| Black or African American alone (NH) | 1,117 (1.69%) | 1,413 (2.00%) | 871 (1.32%) | 1,322 (1.98%) | 3,009 (4.11%) | 3,082 (4.18%) |
| Native American or Alaska Native alone (NH) | 798 (1.21%) | 1,198 (1.69%) | 1,473 (2.23%) | 1,592 (2.38%) | 1,637 (2.24%) | 1,839 (2.49%) |
| Asian alone (NH) | 506 (0.77%) | 849 (1.20%) | 636 (0.96%) | 1,280 (1.91%) | 2,479 (3.39%) | 2,343 (3.18%) |
| Pacific Islander alone (NH) | — | — | 44 (0.07%) | 35 (0.05%) | 52 (0.07%) | 54 (0.07%) |
| Other race alone (NH) | 202 (0.31%) | 42 (0.06%) | 39 (0.06%) | 27 (0.04%) | 169 (0.23%) | — |
| Mixed race or multiracial (NH) | — | — | 886 (1.34%) | 1,383 (2.07%) | 3,412 (4.66%) | 1,988 (2.69%) |
| Hispanic or Latino (any race) | 953 (1.44%) | 1,053 (1.49%) | 1,359 (2.06%) | 1,951 (2.92%) | 3,657 (5.00%) | 4,253 (5.77%) |
| Total | 66,100 (100.00%) | 70,683 (100.00%) | 66,109 (100.00%) | 66,861 (100.00%) | 73,170 (100.00%) | 73,771 (100.00%) |

=== 2024 estimate ===
As of the 2024 estimate, there were 73,771 people, 32,955 households, and _ families residing in the county. The population density was 51.36 inhabitants per square mile (19.8/km^{2}). There were 34,141 housing units at an average density of 23.77 per square mile (9.2/km^{2}). The racial makeup of the county was 86.13% White, 4.42% African American, 2.96% Native American, 3.26% Asian, 0.13% Pacific Islander, _% from some other races and 3.09% from two or more races. Hispanic or Latino people of any race were 5.77% of the population.

=== 2020 census ===
As of the 2020 census, there were 73,170 people, 30,658 households, and 16,186 families residing in the county. The population density was 50.95 inhabitants per square mile (19.7/km^{2}). There were 33,428 housing units at an average density of 23.28 per square mile (9.0/km^{2}). The racial makeup of the county was 82.08% White, 4.19% African American, 2.47% Native American, 3.41% Asian, 0.08% Pacific Islander, 1.37% from some other races and 6.39% from two or more races. Hispanic or Latino people of any race were 5.00% of the population.

There were 30,658 households in the county, of which 25.6% had children under the age of 18 living with them and 26.0% had a female householder with no spouse or partner present. About 35.5% of all households were made up of individuals and 9.3% had someone living alone who was 65 years of age or older.

Of the residents, 21.0% were under the age of 18 and 13.3% were 65 years of age or older; the median age was 31.4 years. For every 100 females there were 104.7 males, and for every 100 females age 18 and over there were 104.5 males. Among occupied housing units, 49.8% were owner-occupied and 50.2% were renter-occupied. The homeowner vacancy rate was 1.6% and the rental vacancy rate was 9.0%.

=== 2010 census ===
As of the 2010 census, there were 66,861 people, 27,417 households, and 15,215 families in the county. The population density was 46.5 inhabitants per square mile (18.0/km^{2}). There were 29,344 housing units at an average density of 20.4 inhabitants per square mile (7.9/km^{2}). The racial makeup of the county was 90.27% White, 2.04% African American, 2.48% Native American, 1.93% Asian, 0.06% Pacific Islander, 0.83% from some other races and 2.39% from two or more races. Hispanic or Latino people of any race were 2.92% of the population.

In terms of ancestry, 34.1% were German, 33.8% were Norwegian, 9.5% were Irish, 5.8% were Polish, 5.3% were English, and 2.9% were American.

Of the 27,417 households, 26.6% had children under the age of 18 living with them, 42.8% were married couples living together, 9.1% had a female householder with no husband present, 44.5% were non-families, and 32.1% of all households were made up of individuals. The average household size was 2.28 and the average family size was 2.91. The median age was 29.7 years.

The median income for a household in the county was $44,242 and the median income for a family was $65,804. Males had a median income of $40,622 versus $31,633 for females. The per capita income for the county was $24,276. About 8.2% of families and 17.5% of the population were below the poverty line, including 15.6% of those under age 18 and 10.3% of those age 65 or over.

== Communities ==
=== Cities ===
- Emerado
- Gilby
- Grand Forks (county seat)
- Inkster
- Larimore
- Manvel
- Niagara
- Northwood
- Reynolds (part)
- Thompson

=== Census-designated places ===
- Grand Forks AFB

=== Other communities ===
- Arvilla
- Belleville
- Holmes
- Honeyford
- Johnstown
- Kelly
- Kempton
- Logan Center
- McCanna
- Mekinock
- Orr
- Powell
- Shawnee

=== Townships ===
- Agnes
- Allendale
- Americus
- Arvilla
- Avon
- Bentru
- Blooming
- Brenna
- Chester
- Elkmount
- Elm Grove
- Fairfield
- Falconer
- Ferry
- Gilby
- Grace
- Grand Forks
- Hegton
- Inkster
- Johnstown
- Lakeville
- Larimore
- Levant
- Lind
- Logan Center
- Loretta
- Mekinock
- Michigan
- Moraine
- Niagara
- Northwood
- Oakville
- Pleasant View
- Plymouth
- Rye
- Strabane
- Turtle River
- Union
- Walle
- Washington
- Wheatfield

Township Numbers and Range Numbers
| | Range 56 | Range 55 | Range 54 | Range 53 | Range 52 | Range 51 | Range 50 | Range 49 |
| Township 154 | Elkmount | Inkster | Strabane | Johnstown | Levant | Turtle River | Turte River | |
| Township 153 | Plymouth | Agnes | Wheatfield | Gilby | Lakeville | Ferry | Ferry | |
| Township 152 | Niagara | Elm Grove | Hegton | Mekinock | Blooming | Rye | Falconer | |
| Township 151 | Moraine | Larimore | Arvilla | Chester | Oakville | Brenna | Grand Forks | |
| Township 150 | Logan Center | Grace | Avon | Pleasant View | Fairfield | Allendale | Walle | Walle |
| Township 149 | Loretta | Lind | Northwood | Washington | Union | Michigan | Americus | Bentru |

== Politics ==
Like all parts of North Dakota other than areas with reservations, Grand Forks County voters historically and currently vote Republican at the presidential level. In only one national election since 1964 has the county selected the Democratic Party candidate. However, the large student population has kept margins closer in recent elections.

United States presidential election results for Grand Forks County, North Dakota
| Year | Republican | | Democratic | | Third party(ies) | |
| Year | No. | % | No. | % | No. | % |
|---|---|---|---|---|---|---|
| 1900 | 2,603 | 61.33% | 1,532 | 36.10% | 109 | 2.57% |
| 1904 | 2,807 | 73.16% | 828 | 21.58% | 202 | 5.26% |
| 1908 | 2,740 | 57.41% | 1,750 | 36.66% | 283 | 5.93% |
| 1912 | 955 | 23.88% | 1,492 | 37.31% | 1,552 | 38.81% |
| 1916 | 2,159 | 41.94% | 2,814 | 54.66% | 175 | 3.40% |
| 1920 | 7,646 | 74.00% | 2,527 | 24.46% | 159 | 1.54% |
| 1924 | 6,690 | 62.81% | 943 | 8.85% | 3,018 | 28.34% |
| 1928 | 8,024 | 64.86% | 4,300 | 34.76% | 47 | 0.38% |
| 1932 | 5,090 | 39.46% | 7,579 | 58.75% | 231 | 1.79% |
| 1936 | 4,312 | 29.64% | 9,222 | 63.39% | 1,015 | 6.98% |
| 1940 | 7,043 | 45.42% | 8,396 | 54.15% | 67 | 0.43% |
| 1944 | 5,668 | 42.19% | 7,707 | 57.37% | 59 | 0.44% |
| 1948 | 6,374 | 46.23% | 6,996 | 50.74% | 419 | 3.04% |
| 1952 | 10,939 | 65.65% | 5,639 | 33.84% | 84 | 0.50% |
| 1956 | 10,289 | 62.17% | 6,231 | 37.65% | 30 | 0.18% |
| 1960 | 10,997 | 56.85% | 8,341 | 43.12% | 5 | 0.03% |
| 1964 | 7,367 | 40.53% | 10,740 | 59.09% | 68 | 0.37% |
| 1968 | 9,802 | 52.00% | 7,695 | 40.82% | 1,352 | 7.17% |
| 1972 | 13,361 | 56.92% | 9,416 | 40.11% | 698 | 2.97% |
| 1976 | 13,820 | 52.71% | 11,545 | 44.03% | 853 | 3.25% |
| 1980 | 14,257 | 57.65% | 6,997 | 28.29% | 3,477 | 14.06% |
| 1984 | 15,898 | 60.70% | 10,050 | 38.37% | 243 | 0.93% |
| 1988 | 14,801 | 53.76% | 12,494 | 45.38% | 236 | 0.86% |
| 1992 | 13,705 | 44.06% | 10,930 | 35.14% | 6,469 | 20.80% |
| 1996 | 11,606 | 44.92% | 11,376 | 44.03% | 2,854 | 11.05% |
| 2000 | 15,875 | 55.93% | 10,593 | 37.32% | 1,917 | 6.75% |
| 2004 | 17,298 | 56.77% | 12,646 | 41.50% | 526 | 1.73% |
| 2008 | 14,520 | 46.34% | 16,104 | 51.40% | 709 | 2.26% |
| 2012 | 15,060 | 50.15% | 14,032 | 46.73% | 937 | 3.12% |
| 2016 | 16,340 | 53.81% | 10,851 | 35.74% | 3,174 | 10.45% |
| 2020 | 16,987 | 54.85% | 12,880 | 41.59% | 1,105 | 3.57% |
| 2024 | 18,123 | 57.70% | 12,469 | 39.70% | 819 | 2.61% |

== Education ==
K-12 school districts include:

- Dakota Prairie Public School District 1
- Central Valley Public School District 3
- Fordville-Lankin Public School District 5
- Grand Forks Public School District 1
- Grand Forks AFB Public School District 140
- Hatton Public School District 7
- Larimore Public School District 44
- Midway Public School District 128
- Northwood Public School District 129
- Thompson Public School District 61

Elementary school districts include:

- Emerado Public School District 127
- Manvel Public School District 125

== See also ==
- National Register of Historic Places listings in Grand Forks County, North Dakota
