= Grand Forks Township, North Dakota =

- Township
- Location within North Dakota
- Coordinates: 47°50′59″N 97°03′08″W
- Country: United States
- State: North Dakota
- County: Grand Forks

Area
  - Total: 9.15 sq mi (23.70 km^{2})
  - Land: 9.09 sq mi (23.55 km^{2})
  - Water: 0.058 sq mi (0.15 km^{2})
- Elevation: 840 ft (256 m)

Population (2020)
  - Total: 465
  - Density: 51.1/sq mi (19.7/km^{2})
- Time zone: UTC-6 (Central (CST))
  - Summer (DST): UTC-5 (CDT)
- ZIP code: 58201 (Grand Forks)
- Area code: 701
- FIPS code: 38-32100
- GNIS feature ID: 1036600

Grand Forks Township is a township in Grand Forks County, North Dakota, United States. The population was 465 at the 2020 census.

The township is increasingly shrinking in area due to gradual annexation by Grand Forks.

== Geography ==
Grand Forks Township has a total area of 9.151 square miles (23.70 km^{2}), of which 9.093 square miles (23.55 km^{2}) is land and 0.058 square miles (0.15 km^{2}) is water.

=== Major highways ===
- Interstate 29
- U.S. Highway 81

== Demographics ==
As of the 2023 American Community Survey, there were an estimated 94 households.
