= Myra Arboretum =

Arboretum in Larimore, North Dakota, United States

Coordinates: 47°56′07″N 97°36′42″W

- Interactive map of Myra Arboretum
- Area: 26 acres (11 ha)
- Website: Official website

Myra Arboretum 26 acres (11 ha), also called Larimore Arboretum, is located on the south branch of the Turtle River in Larimore, North Dakota. The arboretum is located within the Larimore Dam Recreation Area.

The Arboretum contains over 500 trees.

== See also ==
- List of botanical gardens in the United States
