= Strabane Township, Grand Forks County, North Dakota =

Coordinates: 48.1442°N 97.5683°W

Strabane Township is a township in Grand Forks County, in the U.S. state of North Dakota.

== History ==
The township was perhaps named after Strabane, in Northern Ireland.
