= Americus Township, North Dakota =

Township in North Dakota, US

Coordinates: 47.72°N 97.03°W

Americus Township is a township in Grand Forks County, North Dakota, United States. It has a population of 162 people with a population density of five people per square mile.

== Geography ==
=== Major highways ===
- Interstate 29
- U.S. Highway 81
