= Falconer Township, North Dakota =

- Township
- Location within North Dakota
- Coordinates: 47°58′51″N 97°05′02″W
- Country: United States
- State: North Dakota
- County: Grand Forks

Area
  - Total: 12.31 sq mi (31.87 km^{2})
  - Land: 12.17 sq mi (31.53 km^{2})
  - Water: 0.14 sq mi (0.35 km^{2})
- Elevation: 827 ft (252 m)

Population (2020)
  - Total: 261
  - Density: 21.4/sq mi (8.28/km^{2})
- Time zone: UTC-6 (Central (CST))
  - Summer (DST): UTC-5 (CDT)
- ZIP code: 58203 (Grand Forks)
- Area code: 701
- FIPS code: 38-25540
- GNIS feature ID: 1036601

Falconer Township is a township in Grand Forks County, North Dakota, United States. The population was 261 at the 2020 census.

== Geography ==
Falconer Township has a total area of 12.307 square miles (31.87 km^{2}), of which 12.172 square miles (31.53 km^{2}) is land and 0.135 square miles (0.35 km^{2}) is water.

=== Major highways ===
- Interstate 29
- U.S. Highway 81

== Demographics ==
As of the 2023 American Community Survey, there were an estimated 95 households.
