= Elkmount Township, North Dakota =

- Township
- Location within North Dakota
- Coordinates: 48°09′05″N 97°50′19″W
- Country: United States
- State: North Dakota
- County: Grand Forks

Area
  - Total: 35.98 sq mi (93.18 km^{2})
  - Land: 35.85 sq mi (92.85 km^{2})
  - Water: 0.13 sq mi (0.33 km^{2})
- Elevation: 1,221 ft (372 m)

Population (2020)
  - Total: 45
  - Density: 1.3/sq mi (0.48/km^{2})
- Time zone: UTC-6 (Central (CST))
  - Summer (DST): UTC-5 (CDT)
- Area code: 701
- FIPS code: 38-23180
- GNIS feature ID: 1036627

Elkmount Township is a township in the northeastern corner of Grand Forks County, North Dakota, United States. The population was 45 at the 2020 census.

The unincorporated community of Belleville is located within Elkmount Township.

== Geography ==
Elkmount Township has a total area of 35.978 square miles (93.18 km^{2}), of which 35.849 square miles (92.85 km^{2}) is land and 0.129 square miles (0.33 km^{2}) is water.

=== Major highways ===
- North Dakota Highway 32
