= Rye Township, North Dakota =

- Township
- Location within North Dakota
- Coordinates: 47°58′36″N 97°10′29″W
- Country: United States
- State: North Dakota
- County: Grand Forks

Area
  - Total: 27.61 sq mi (71.50 km^{2})
  - Land: 27.61 sq mi (71.50 km^{2})
  - Water: 0 sq mi (0.00 km^{2})
- Elevation: 837 ft (255 m)

Population (2020)
  - Total: 402
  - Density: 14.6/sq mi (5.62/km^{2})
- Time zone: UTC-6 (Central (CST))
  - Summer (DST): UTC-5 (CDT)
- ZIP code: 58203 (Grand Forks)
- Area code: 701
- FIPS code: 38-69540
- GNIS feature ID: 1036603

Rye Township is a township in Grand Forks County, North Dakota, United States. The population was 402 at the 2020 census.

== Geography ==
Rye Township has a total area of 27.608 square miles (71.50 km^{2}), all land.

=== Major highways ===
- Interstate 29
- U.S. Highway 81

== Demographics ==
As of the 2023 American Community Survey, there were an estimated 152 households.
