= Grand Forks Air Force Base (CDP) =

Grand Forks AFB, North Dakota
- CDP
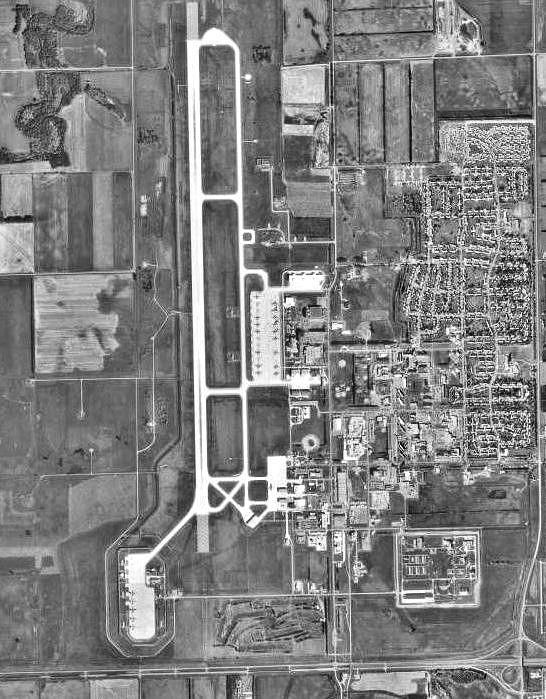
- The base in 1997

- Location of Grand Forks AFB, North Dakota

- Location within North Dakota Location within the United States
- Coordinates: 47.95568°N 97.39128°W
- Country: United States
- State: North Dakota
- County: Grand Forks
- Founded: 1957

Area
  - Total: 7.500 sq mi (19.424 km^{2})
  - Land: 7.500 sq mi (19.424 km^{2})
  - Water: 0 sq mi (0.000 km^{2}) 0.0%
- Elevation: 899 ft (274 m)

Population (2020)
  - Total: 2,002
  - Estimate (2023): 2,072
  - Density: 267.0/sq mi (103.07/km^{2})
- Time zone: UTC–6 (Central (CST))
  - Summer (DST): UTC–5 (CDT)
- ZIP Codes: 58204, 58205
- Area code: 701
- FIPS code: 38-32140
- GNIS feature ID: 2393020
- Website: grandforks.af.mil

Grand Forks Air Force Base is a census-designated place (CDP) in Grand Forks County, North Dakota, United States. It corresponds to Grand Forks Air Force Base, a United States Air Force installation. The population was 2,002 at the 2020 census, and was estimated at 2,072 in 2023.

== History ==
Grand Forks AFB was founded in 1957.

== Geography ==
According to the United States Census Bureau, the CDP has a total area of 7.500 square miles (19.42 km^{2}), all land.

== Demographics ==
Historical population
Census	Pop.	Note	%±
1970	10,474		—
1980	9,390		−10.3%
1990	9,343		−0.5%
2000	4,832		−48.3%
2010	2,367		−51.0%
2020	2,002		−15.4%
2023 (est.)	2,072		3.5%
U.S. Decennial Census; 2020 Census

According to realtor website Zillow, the average price of a home as of August 31, 2025, in Grand Forks AFB is $264,410.

As of the 2023 American Community Survey, there are 523 estimated households in Grand Forks AFB with an average of 3.61 persons per household. The CDP has a median household income of $72,279. Approximately 3.3% of the CDP's population lives at or below the poverty line. Grand Forks AFB has an estimated 26.9% employment rate, with 31.2% of the population holding a bachelor's degree or higher and 97.0% holding a high school diploma. There were 536 housing units at an average density of 71.47 per square mile (27.6/km^{2}).

The top five reported languages (people were allowed to report up to two languages, thus the figures will generally add to more than 100%) were English (88.5%), Spanish (8.1%), Indo-European (0.6%), Asian and Pacific Islander (2.9%), and Other (0.0%).

The median age in the CDP was 21.5 years.

Grand Forks AFB, North Dakota – racial and ethnic composition Note: the US Census treats Hispanic/Latino as an ethnic category. This table excludes Latinos from the racial categories and assigns them to a separate category. Hispanics/Latinos may be of any race.
Race / ethnicity (NH = non-Hispanic)	Pop. 1980	Pop. 1990	Pop. 2000	Pop. 2010	Pop. 2020
White alone (NH)	7,954 (84.71%)	7,720 (82.63%)	3,801 (78.66%)	1,710 (72.24%)	1,197 (59.79%)
Black or African American alone (NH)	810 (8.63%)	952 (10.19%)	396 (8.20%)	226 (9.55%)	170 (8.49%)
Native American or Alaska Native alone (NH)	43 (0.46%)	59 (0.63%)	35 (0.72%)	9 (0.38%)	6 (0.30%)
Asian alone (NH)	189 (2.01%)	263 (2.81%)	112 (2.32%)	64 (2.70%)	73 (3.65%)
Pacific Islander alone (NH)	—	—	15 (0.31%)	13 (0.55%)	15 (0.75%)
Other race alone (NH)	12 (0.13%)	20 (0.21%)	10 (0.21%)	1 (0.04%)	5 (0.25%)
Mixed race or multiracial (NH)	—	—	174 (3.60%)	107 (4.52%)	213 (10.64%)
Hispanic or Latino (any race)	382 (4.07%)	329 (3.52%)	289 (5.98%)	237 (10.01%)	323 (16.13%)
Total	9,390 (100.00%)	9,343 (100.00%)	4,832 (100.00%)	2,367 (100.00%)	2,002 (100.00%)

=== 2020 census ===
As of the 2020 census, there were 2,002 people, 596 households, and 500 families residing in the CDP. The population density was 266.93 inhabitants per square mile (103.1/km^{2}). There were 614 housing units at an average density of 81.87 per square mile (31.6/km^{2}). The racial makeup of the CDP was 65.48% White, 9.24% African American, 0.75% Native American, 3.65% Asian, 0.95% Pacific Islander, 2.75% from some other races and 17.18% from two or more races. Hispanic or Latino people of any race were 16.13% of the population.

=== 2010 census ===
As of the 2010 census, there were 2,367 people, 597 households, and _ families residing in the CDP. The population density was 315.60 inhabitants per square mile (121.9/km^{2}). There were 807 housing units at an average density of 107.60 per square mile (41.5/km^{2}). The racial makeup of the CDP was 77.10% White, 10.18% African American, 0.51% Native American, 2.83% Asian, 0.72% Pacific Islander, 2.87% from some other races and 6.79% from two or more races. Hispanic or Latino people of any race were 10.01% of the population.

=== 2000 census ===
As of the 2000 census, there were 4,832 people, 1,279 households, and 1,230 families residing in the CDP. The population density was 590.45 inhabitants per square mile (228.0/km^{2}). There were 1,516 housing units at an average density of 185.25 per square mile (71.5/km^{2}). The racial makeup of the CDP was 80.86% White, 8.40% African American, 0.89% Native American, 2.42% Asian, 0.31% Pacific Islander, 2.67% from some other races and 4.45% from two or more races. Hispanic or Latino people of any race were 5.98% of the population.

There were 1,279 households, out of which 77.3% had children under the age of 18 living with them, 88.5% were married couples living together, 4.1% had a female householder with no husband present, and 3.8% were non-families. 3.0% of all households were made up of individuals, and none had someone living alone who was 65 years of age or older. The average household size was 3.41 and the average family size was 3.48.

On the base the population was spread out, with 38.4% under the age of 18, 20.4% from 18 to 24, 39.4% from 25 to 44, 1.7% from 45 to 64, and 0.1% who were 65 years of age or older. The median age Was 22 years. For every 100 females, there were 115.0 males. For every 100 females age 18 and over, there were 123.9 males.

The median income for a household on the base was $36,414, and the median income for a family was $36,104. Males had a median income of $24,413 versus $17,750 for females. The per capita income for the base was $11,503. About 4.0% of families and 4.2% of the population were below the poverty line, including 3.6% of those under the age of 18 and none of those 65 and older.

== Education ==
It is within the Grand Forks AFB Public School District 140. The district, along with the Grand Forks School District, is administered as part of Grand Forks Public Schools.
