= Mekinock, North Dakota =

- Census Designated Place & City
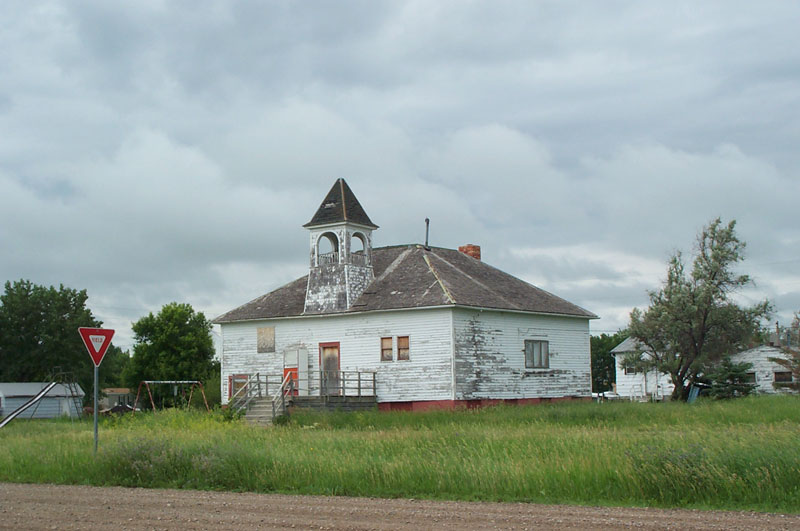

- Location within the state of North Dakota Mekinock (the United States)
- Coordinates: 48°0′46″N 97°21′48″W
- Country: United States
- State: North Dakota
- County: Grand Forks
- Elevation: 860 ft (260 m)

Population (2020)
  - Total: 2,152
  - Estimate (2023): 2,305
- Time zone: UTC-6 (Central (CST))
  - Summer (DST): UTC-5 (CDT)
- ZIP codes: 58258
- Area code: 701
- GNIS feature ID: 1030186

Mekinock is an unincorporated community and census-designated place in eastern Grand Forks County, North Dakota, United States. It lies northwest of the city of Grand Forks, the county seat of Grand Forks County. The population of the community was 2,152 at the 2020 census, and was estimated to be 2,305 in 2023. Mekinock's elevation is 860 feet (260 m). It has a post office with the ZIP code 58258. The post office was established in 1879.
