= Gilby, North Dakota =

- City
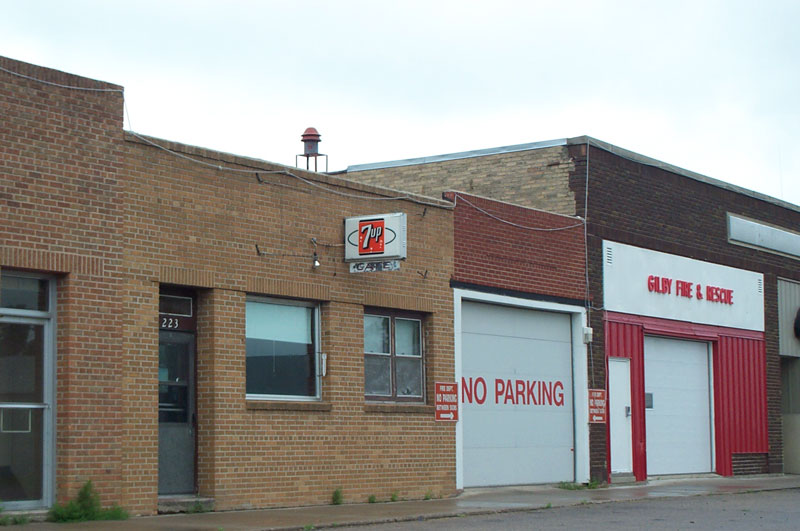
- Gilby Fire and Rescue

- Location of Gilby, North Dakota
- Coordinates: 48°05′01″N 97°28′04″W
- Country: United States
- State: North Dakota
- County: Grand Forks
- Metro: Greater Grand Forks
- Founded: July 13, 1887

Area
  - Total: 0.18 sq mi (0.46 km^{2})
  - Land: 0.18 sq mi (0.46 km^{2})
  - Water: 0 sq mi (0.00 km^{2})
- Elevation: 879 ft (268 m)

Population (2020)
  - Total: 243
  - Estimate (2022): 239
  - Density: 1,372.8/sq mi (530.04/km^{2})
- Time zone: UTC-6 (Central (CST))
  - Summer (DST): UTC-5 (CDT)
- ZIP code: 58235
- Area code: 701
- FIPS code: 38-30180
- GNIS feature ID: 1036054
- Website: www.gilbynorthdakota.com

Gilby is a city in Grand Forks County, North Dakota, United States. It is part of the Greater Grand Forks Metropolitan Statistical Area. The population was 243 at the 2020 census. Gilby was founded in 1887.

== Geography ==
According to the United States Census Bureau, the city has a total area of 0.17 square miles (0.44 km^{2}), all land.

== Demographics ==
Historical population
Census	Pop.	Note	%±
1960	281		—
1970	268		−4.6%
1980	283		5.6%
1990	262		−7.4%
2000	243		−7.3%
2010	237		−2.5%
2020	243		2.5%
2022 (est.)	239		−1.6%
U.S. Decennial Census; 2020 Census

=== 2010 census ===
As of the census of 2010, there were 237 people, 98 households, and 68 families living in the city. The population density was 1,394.1 inhabitants per square mile (538.3/km^{2}). There were 110 housing units at an average density of 647.1 per square mile (249.8/km^{2}). The racial makeup of the city was 94.5% White, 1.7% from other races, and 3.8% from two or more races. Hispanic or Latino of any race were 7.6% of the population.

There were 98 households, of which 34.7% had children under the age of 18 living with them, 54.1% were married couples living together, 10.2% had a female householder with no husband present, 5.1% had a male householder with no wife present, and 30.6% were non-families. 26.5% of all households were made up of individuals, and 6.1% had someone living alone who was 65 years of age or older. The average household size was 2.42 and the average family size was 2.93.

The median age in the city was 40.1 years. 25.3% of residents were under the age of 18; 6.8% were between the ages of 18 and 24; 29.9% were from 25 to 44; 29.5% were from 45 to 64; and 8.4% were 65 years of age or older. The gender makeup of the city was 50.2% male and 49.8% female.

=== 2000 census ===
As of the census of 2000, there were 243 people, 96 households, and 62 families living in the city. The population density was 1,370.8 inhabitants per square mile (529.3/km^{2}). There were 114 housing units at an average density of 643.1 per square mile (248.3/km^{2}). The racial makeup of the city was 93.83% White, 1.23% African American, 1.23% Native American, 1.65% Asian, 0.41% from other races, and 1.65% from two or more races. Hispanic or Latino of any race were 3.70% of the population.

There were 96 households, out of which 33.3% had children under the age of 18 living with them, 59.4% were married couples living together, 3.1% had a female householder with no husband present, and 35.4% were non-families. 31.3% of all households were made up of individuals, and 18.8% had someone living alone who was 65 years of age or older. The average household size was 2.53 and the average family size was 3.15.

In the city, the population was spread out, with 29.6% under the age of 18, 3.3% from 18 to 24, 38.3% from 25 to 44, 15.2% from 45 to 64, and 13.6% who were 65 years of age or older. The median age was 35 years. For every 100 females, there were 109.5 males. For every 100 females age 18 and over, there were 108.5 males.

The median income for a household in the city was $33,393, and the median income for a family was $41,406. Males had a median income of $25,833 versus $16,250 for females. The per capita income for the city was $14,909. None of the families and 5.1% of the population were living below the poverty line, including no under eighteens and 11.6% of those over 64.

== Education ==
It is within the Midway Public School District 128.
