= Arvilla, North Dakota =

- Unincorporated community
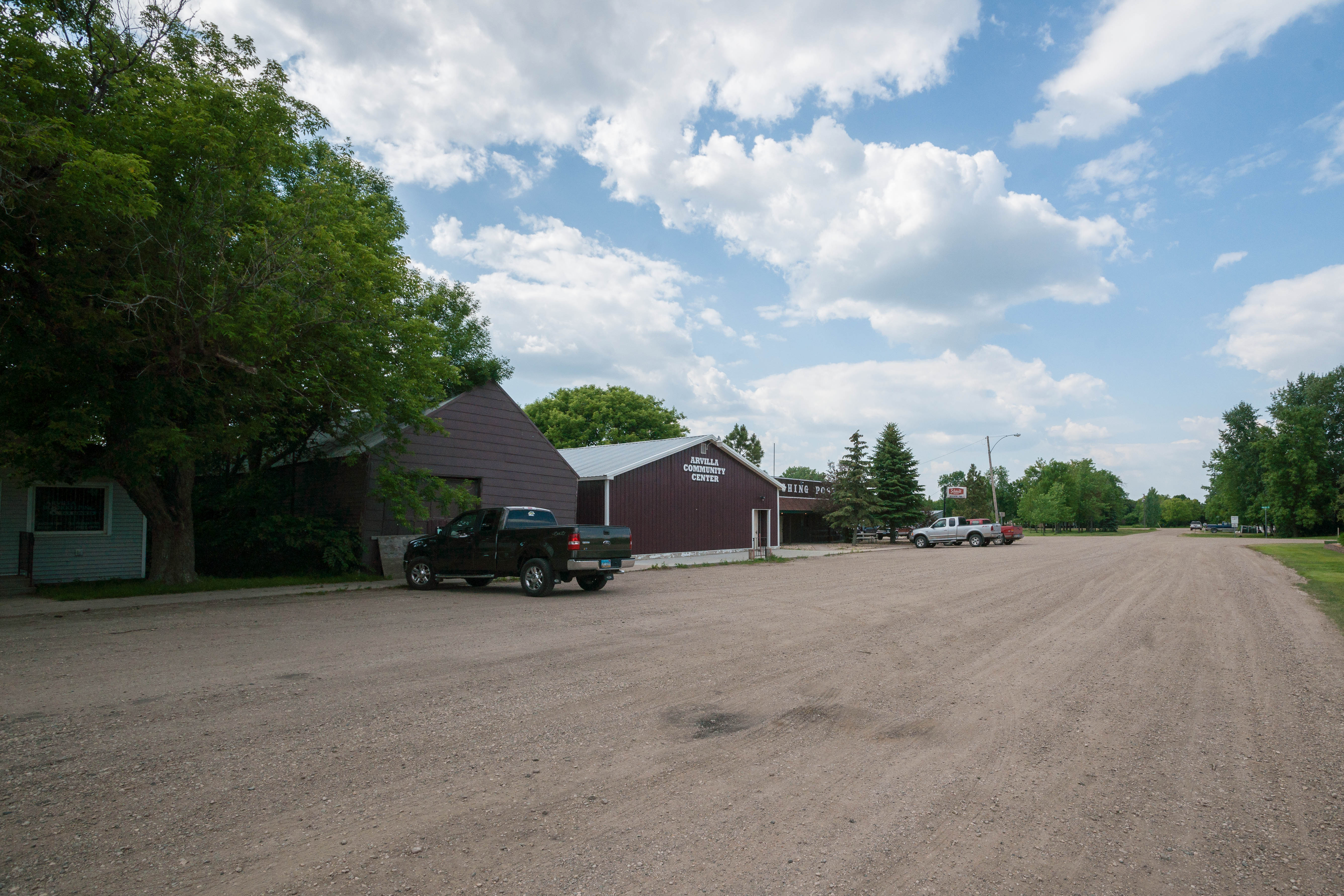
- Hughes Avenue in Arvilla

- Location within the state of North Dakota Arvilla (the United States)
- Coordinates: 47°55′9″N 97°29′41″W
- Country: United States
- State: North Dakota
- County: Grand Forks
- Township: Arvilla
- Elevation: 1,004 ft (306 m)
- Time zone: UTC-6 (Central (CST))
  - Summer (DST): UTC-5 (CDT)
- ZIP codes: 58214
- Area code: 701
- GNIS feature ID: 1027748

Arvilla (formerly Orange) is an unincorporated community in central Grand Forks County, North Dakota, United States. It lies along U.S. Route 2, west of the city of Grand Forks, the county seat of Grand Forks County. Its elevation is 1,004 feet (306 m). The community was first named Orange for Orange County, New York; it was renamed Arvilla for Arvilla Estella Hersey, the wife of a local farmer. Although Arvilla is unincorporated, it has a post office, with the ZIP code of 58214. The post office was established in 1882.

== Climate ==
This climatic region is typified by large seasonal temperature differences, with warm to hot (and often humid) summers and cold (sometimes severely cold) winters. According to the Köppen Climate Classification system, Arvilla has a humid continental climate, abbreviated "Dfb" on climate maps.

== Transportation ==
Amtrak’s Empire Builder, which operates between Seattle/Portland and Chicago, passes through the town on BNSF tracks, but makes no stop. The nearest station is located in Grand Forks, 20 miles (32 km) to the east.
