= Emerado, North Dakota =

- City
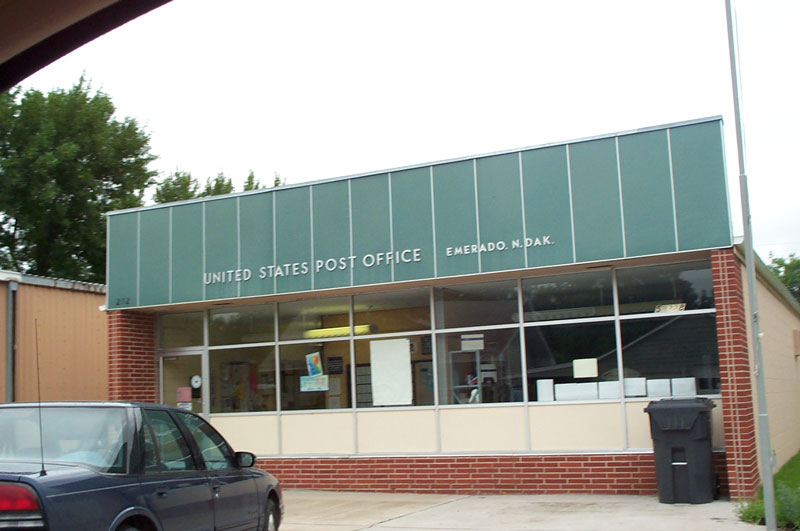
- The Post Office in Emerado

- Logo
- Nickname: "City of fun"
- Interactive map of Emerado, North Dakota
- Location within North Dakota
- Coordinates: 47.9286°N 97.3616°W
- Country: United States
- State: North Dakota
- County: Grand Forks
- Metro: Greater Grand Forks
- Founded: September 1885

Government
  - Type: Mayor–council
  - Mayor: Jake Lanes
  - President: Bobby Strom
  - Vice president: Ruth Gruber
  - Councilmember: Joel Linneman

Area
  - Total: 0.310 sq mi (0.803 km^{2})
  - Land: 0.310 sq mi (0.803 km^{2})
  - Water: 0 sq mi (0.000 km^{2}) 0.00%
- Elevation: 889 ft (271 m)

Population (2020)
  - Total: 443
  - Estimate (2025): 452
  - Density: 1,430/sq mi (552/km^{2})
- Time zone: UTC–6 (Central (CST))
  - Summer (DST): UTC–5 (CDT)
- ZIP Code: 58228
- Area code: 701
- FIPS code: 38-24060
- GNIS feature ID: 1036023
- Highways: US 2
- Website: cityofemerado.com

Emerado is a city in Grand Forks County, North Dakota, United States located near Grand Forks Air Force Base. It is part of the "Grand Forks, ND-MN Metropolitan Statistical Area" or "Greater Grand Forks". The population was 443 as of the 2020 census, and was estimated at 452 in 2025. Grand Forks Air Force Base is located near Emerado.

== Geography ==
According to the United States Census Bureau, the city has a total area of 0.310 square miles (0.80 km^{2}), all land.

== Climate ==
This climatic region is typified by large seasonal temperature differences, with warm to hot (and often humid) summers and cold (sometimes severely cold) winters. According to the Köppen Climate Classification system, Emerado has a warm-summer humid continental climate, abbreviated "Dfb" on climate maps.

== Demographics ==
Historical population
Census	Pop.	Note	%±
1960	328		—
1970	515		57.0%
1980	596		15.7%
1990	483		−19.0%
2000	510		5.6%
2010	414		−18.8%
2020	443		7.0%
2025 (est.)	452		2.0%
U.S. Decennial Census; 2020 Census

According to realtor website Zillow, the average price of a home as of June 30, 2026, in Emerado was $233,980.

As of the 2024 American Community Survey, there were 173 estimated households in Emerado with an average of 2.00 persons per household. The city has a median household income of $70,938. Approximately 7.2% of the city's population lives at or below the poverty line. Emerado has an estimated 56.1% employment rate, with 37.3% of the population holding a bachelor's degree or higher and 87.3% holding a high school diploma. There were 290 housing units at an average density of 221.37 per square mile (85.5/km^{2}).

The top five reported languages (people were allowed to report up to two languages, thus the figures will generally add to more than 100%) were English (94.8%), Spanish (1.6%), Indo-European (3.6%), Asian and Pacific Islander (0.0%), and Other (0.0%).

The median age in the city was 37.5 years.

Emerado, North Dakota – racial and ethnic composition Note: the US Census treats Hispanic/Latino as an ethnic category. This table excludes Latinos from the racial categories and assigns them to a separate category. Hispanics/Latinos may be of any race.
Race / ethnicity (NH = non-Hispanic)	Pop. 2000	Pop. 2010	Pop. 2020	% 2000	% 2010	% 2020
White alone (NH)	383	313	313	75.10%	75.60%	70.65%
Black or African American alone (NH)	26	19	20	5.10%	4.59%	4.51%
Native American or Alaska Native alone (NH)	35	27	20	6.86%	6.52%	4.51%
Asian alone (NH)	14	8	6	2.75%	1.93%	1.35%
Pacific Islander alone (NH)	0	0	0	0.00%	0.00%	0.00%
Other race alone (NH)	0	0	0	0.00%	0.00%	0.00%
Mixed race or multiracial (NH)	17	17	40	3.33%	4.11%	9.03%
Hispanic or Latino (any race)	35	30	44	6.86%	7.25%	9.93%
Total	510	414	443	100.00%	100.00%	100.00%

=== 2020 census ===
As of the 2020 census, there were 443 people, 194 households, and 99 families residing in the city. The population density was 1,429.03 inhabitants per square mile (551.8/km^{2}). There were 251 housing units at an average density of 809.68 per square mile (312.6/km^{2}). The racial makeup of the city was 75.40% White, 4.51% African American, 4.97% Native American, 1.35% Asian, 0.00% Pacific Islander, 2.26% from some other races, and 11.51% from two or more races. Hispanic or Latino people of any race were 9.93% of the population.

=== 2010 census ===
As of the 2010 census, there were 414 people, 184 households, and 119 families residing in the city. The population density was 1,352.94 inhabitants per square mile (522.4/km^{2}). There were 233 housing units at an average density of 761.44 per square mile (294.0/km^{2}). The racial makeup of the city was 80.19% White, 4.59% African American, 7.00% Native American, 1.93% Asian, 0.00% Pacific Islander, 1.93% from some other races, and 4.35% from two or more races. Hispanic or Latino people of any race were 7.25% of the population.

There were 184 households, of which 29.3% had children under the age of 18 living with them, 46.7% were married couples living together, 12.0% had a female householder with no husband present, 6.0% had a male householder with no wife present, and 35.3% were non-families. 31.5% of all households were made up of individuals, and 6.5% had someone living alone who was 65 years of age or older. The average household size was 2.25 and the average family size was 2.74.

The median age in the city was 39.1 years. 22% of residents were under the age of 18; 9.1% were between the ages of 18 and 24; 27.1% were from 25 to 44; 33.3% were from 45 to 64; and 8.5% were 65 years of age or older. The gender makeup of the city was 51.9% male and 48.1% female.

=== 2000 census ===
As of the 2000 census, there were 510 people, 234 households, and 120 families residing in the city. The population density was 1,632.62 inhabitants per square mile (630.4/km^{2}). There were 328 housing units at an average density of 1,050.00 per square mile (405.4/km^{2}). The racial makeup of the city was 76.27% White, 5.49% African American, 6.86% Native American, 3.14% Asian, 0.00% Pacific Islander, 4.51% from some other races, and 3.73% from two or more races. Hispanic or Latino people of any race were 6.86% of the population.

There were 234 households, out of which 27.8% had children under the age of 18 living with them, 37.6% were married couples living together, 11.1% had a female householder with no husband present, and 48.3% were non-families. 38.9% of all households were made up of individuals, and 3.4% had someone living alone who was 65 years of age or older. The average household size was 2.18 and the average family size was 2.95.

In the city, the population was spread out, with 24.3% under the age of 18, 9.4% from 18 to 24, 40.2% from 25 to 44, 22.2% from 45 to 64, and 3.9% who were 65 years of age or older. The median age was 33 years. For every 100 females, there were 127.7 males. For every 100 females age 18 and over, there were 128.4 males.

The median income for a household in the city was $25,962, and the median income for a family was $33,750. Males had a median income of $24,844 versus $20,625 for females. The per capita income for the city was $17,477. About 22.0% of families and 22.9% of the population were below the poverty line, including 35.4% of those under age 18 and 33.3% of those age 65 or over.

== Transportation ==
Amtrak’s Empire Builder, which operates between Seattle/Portland and Chicago, passes through the town on BNSF tracks, but makes no stop. The nearest station is located in Grand Forks, 15 miles (24 km) to the east.

== Education ==
Emerado is served by the Emerado Public School District. It operates the Emerado School. In the 2025-26 academic year, the district reported a total of 94 students. Emerado Elementary School.

Emerado Elementary School has students Pre-K through 8. Students graduating on to High School can open enroll in any of the nearby schools (Grand Forks, Northwood, Larimore). Emerado school provides bus service to Larimore High School only. Emerado School has a breakfast program as well as an after-school program for the students. Student enrollment is around a hundred students which offers students the comfort of a small school without taking away from their educational opportunities.
