= North Dakota Highway 18 =

State highway in North Dakota, US

North Dakota Highway 18
- ND 18 highlighted in red

Route information
- Maintained by NDDOT
- Length: 242.147 mi (389.698 km)
- Existed: 1939–present

Major junctions
- South end: SD 25 near Claire City, SD
- ND 11 near Lidgerwood; ND 13 near Wyndmere; I-94 / US 52 in Casselton; ND 200 in Mayville; US 2 near Larimore; ND 5 in Cavalier
- North end: PTH 30 at the Canadian border in Neche

Location
- Country: United States
- State: North Dakota
- Counties: Pembina, Walsh, Grand Forks, Traill, Cass, Richland

Highway system
- North Dakota State Highway System; Interstate; US; State
| ← ND 17 | → ND 19 |

North Dakota Highway 18 is a major north–south highway in eastern North Dakota. It runs from Highway 30 at the Canadian border south of Gretna, Manitoba to South Dakota Highway 25 north of Claire City.

== Route description ==
North Dakota Highway 18 begins at the border with South Dakota where that state's Highway 25 crosses the border. Highway 18 travels north for nine miles and joins with North Dakota Highway 11 just two miles east of Lidgerwood and heads west and north, passing through the town, where the concurrency ends. The highway travels alone north for five miles, jogs east for a mile, then heads seven miles north again to the intersection with North Dakota Highway 13 directly south of Wyndmere.

The road leaves that town traveling northward twelve miles more to reach the eastern terminus of North Dakota Highway 27, then travels thirteen miles further north to the line between Richland County and Cass County. There it begins a concurrency with North Dakota State Highway 46 to travel west along the county line for five miles until it diverges, traveling north two miles to the town of Leonard. Reaching Leonard, it travels six miles north and one mile east, then north nine more miles to reach an interchange with Interstate 94 and US 52. One mile north of this the road enters Casselton. The highway leaves Casselton to the west, turns immediately north and travels fourteen miles that direction to Arthur. Passing through it, the road heads north six more miles to enter Hunter. It then travels yet three miles north to the Traill County line.

Once in Traill County it runs eight miles north to Blanchard. The highway leaves Blanchard on the west, traveling five miles that direction then north for ten miles more to reach Mayville. There, it runs concurrent with North Dakota Highway 200 west for a mile out of town before entering Portland. Then it runs northwest for a mile, west for a mile and a half, and north for a mile before it diverges from Highway 200 to travel north for eight miles to Hatton. Two miles north of Hatton it reaches the line with Grand Forks County. Highway 18 then moves north for five miles, joining to run westward with North Dakota Highway 15 for eight miles, passing just north of Northwood on the way. Then the two roads separate and Highway 18 turns north to travel twelve miles to the city of Larimore. Two miles north of the city Highway 18 reaches a junction with US Highway 2, a major east-west route of the northern United States. Fourteen miles north of this interchange North Dakota Highway 18 passes Inkster two miles to the west. Three miles north of that it reaches the county line with Walsh County.

Fourteen miles north of the county line it begins to run with North Dakota State Highway 17 for a mile, passing midway between the cities of Grafton and Park River in the distance. It continues north alone for eight miles to pass to the east of the small city of Hoople, just south of the line with Pembina County.

Four miles north of the county line the road intersects with North Dakota Highway 66, then travels thirteen miles north to Cavalier. It joins with North Dakota Highway 5 in Cavalier and runs concurrent with it north of the city for a mile, then east for three where they split and the highway turns north. It runs north for thirteen miles to Neche, where it crosses the Pembina River. A mile north of this it terminates its journey at the Canadian border at Gretna, Manitoba.

== History ==
North Dakota Highway 18, like many other North Dakota state highways, was put into alignment in 1939. It has remained in its original alignment since then.

== Major intersections ==
| County | Location | mi | km | Destinations | Notes |
|---|---|---|---|---|---|
| Pembina | | 242.147 | 389.698 | PTH 30 north – Gretna | Continuation into Manitoba, Canada |
| Pembina | | 228.609 | 367.911 | ND 5 east – Hamilton | Northern end of ND 5 concurrency |
| Pembina | Cavalier | 224.991 | 362.088 | ND 5 west – Langdon | Southern end of ND 5 concurrency |
| Pembina | | 211.591 | 340.523 | ND 66 – Milton, Drayton | |
| Walsh | | 198.447 | 319.369 | ND 17 east – Grafton | Northern end of ND 17 concurrency |
| Walsh | | 197.571 | 317.960 | ND 17 west – Park River | Southern end of ND 17 concurrency |
| Grand Forks | | 166.225 | 267.513 | US 2 – Devils Lake, Grand Forks | |
| Grand Forks | | 152.185 | 244.918 | ND 15 west – McVille | Western end of ND 15 concurrency |
| Grand Forks | | 114.902 | 184.917 | ND 15 east – Thompson | Eastern end of ND 15 concurrency |
| Traill | | 129.127 | 207.810 | ND 200 west – Finley | Western end of ND 200 concurrency |
| Traill | Mayville | 121.814 | 196.041 | ND 200 east – I-29/US 81 | Eastern end of ND 200 concurrency |
| Traill | | 106.883 | 172.012 | ND 200A – I-29/US 81 | Western terminus of ND 200A |
| Cass | Casselton | 73.550 | 118.367 | ND 10 west (37th Street SE) | Northern end of ND 10 concurrency, unsigned |
| Cass | Casselton | 73.407 | 118.137 | I-94 / US 52 – Valley City, Bismarck, Fargo | I-94 Exit 331 |
| Cass | Casselton | 73.258 | 117.897 | ND 10 east (37th Street SE) – Durbin | Southern end of ND 10 concurrency, unsigned |
| Cass–Richland county line | | 55.589 | 89.462 | ND 46 west – Enderlin | Western end of ND 46 concurrency Entire concurrency is along the county line |
| Cass–Richland county line | | 50.650 | 81.513 | ND 46 east – Kindred | Eastern end of ND 46 concurrency |
| Richland | | 37.664 | 60.614 | ND 27 west – Lisbon | Eastern terminus of ND 27 |
| Richland | Wyndmere | 24.827 | 39.955 | ND 13 – Milnor, Wahpeton | |
| Richland | Lidgerwood | 11.760 | 18.926 | ND 11 west – Forman | Western end of ND 11 concurrency |
| Richland | | 9.198 | 14.803 | ND 11 east – Hankinson | Eastern end of ND 11 concurrency |
| Roberts | | 0.000 | 0.000 | SD 25 south – Claire City | Continuation into South Dakota |
1.000 mi = 1.609 km; 1.000 km = 0.621 mi: Concurrency terminus
