= Manvel, North Dakota =

- City
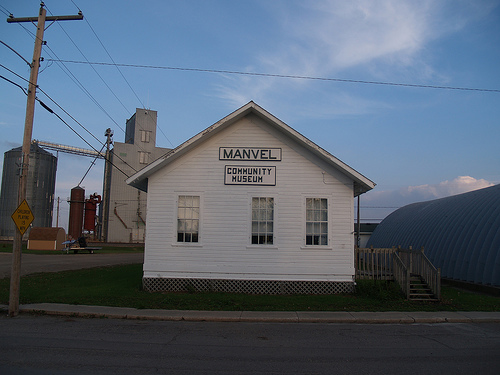
- The community museum in Manvel

- Location of Manvel, North Dakota
- Coordinates: 48°04′22″N 97°10′41″W
- Country: United States
- State: North Dakota
- County: Grand Forks
- Metro: Greater Grand Forks
- Founded: 1881

Area
  - Total: 0.29 sq mi (0.74 km^{2})
  - Land: 0.29 sq mi (0.74 km^{2})
  - Water: 0 sq mi (0.00 km^{2})
- Elevation: 820 ft (250 m)

Population (2020)
  - Total: 377
  - Estimate (2022): 367
  - Density: 1,318.6/sq mi (509.11/km^{2})
- Time zone: UTC-6 (Central (CST))
  - Summer (DST): UTC-5 (CDT)
- ZIP code: 58256
- Area code: 701
- FIPS code: 38-50420
- GNIS feature ID: 1036148

Manvel is a city in Grand Forks County, North Dakota, United States. It sits on the banks of the Turtle River. It is part of the "Grand Forks, ND-MN Metropolitan Statistical Area" or "Greater Grand Forks". The population was 377 at the 2020 census. Manvel was founded in 1881.

== History ==
The first settlement at Manvel was made in the 1860s on a stagecoach route. Manvel was laid out in 1881 when the railroad was extended to that point. The city was named for a Great Northern Railway passenger agent named Allen A. Manvel. A post office has been in operation at Manvel since 1882.

== Geography ==
According to the United States Census Bureau, the city has a total area of 0.29 square miles (0.75 km^{2}), all land.

== Demographics ==
Historical population
Census	Pop.	Note	%±
1930	183		—
1940	209		14.2%
1950	278		33.0%
1960	313		12.6%
1970	265		−15.3%
1980	308		16.2%
1990	333		8.1%
2000	370		11.1%
2010	360		−2.7%
2020	377		4.7%
2022 (est.)	367		−2.7%
U.S. Decennial Census; 2020 Census

=== 2010 census ===
As of the census of 2010, there were 360 people, 137 households, and 102 families living in the city. The population density was 1,241.4 inhabitants per square mile (479.3/km^{2}). There were 149 housing units at an average density of 513.8 per square mile (198.4/km^{2}). The racial makeup of the city was 99.2% White, 0.3% Native American, and 0.6% from two or more races. Hispanic or Latino of any race were 0.8% of the population.

There were 137 households, of which 39.4% had children under the age of 18 living with them, 64.2% were married couples living together, 7.3% had a female householder with no husband present, 2.9% had a male householder with no wife present, and 25.5% were non-families. 22.6% of all households were made up of individuals, and 7.2% had someone living alone who was 65 years of age or older. The average household size was 2.63 and the average family size was 3.12.

The median age in the city was 37.1 years. 28.1% of residents were under the age of 18; 6.9% were between the ages of 18 and 24; 27.8% were from 25 to 44; 28.1% were from 45 to 64; and 9.2% were 65 years of age or older. The gender makeup of the city was 51.4% male and 48.6% female.

=== 2000 census ===
As of the census of 2000, there were 370 people, 141 households, and 100 families living in the city. The population density was 1,254.8 inhabitants per square mile (484.5/km^{2}). There were 144 housing units at an average density of 488.4 per square mile (188.6/km^{2}). The racial makeup of the city was 96.22% White, 0.81% African American, 1.35% Native American, 0.81% from other races, and 0.81% from two or more races. Hispanic or Latino of any race were 1.35% of the population.

There were 141 households, out of which 34.0% had children under the age of 18 living with them, 59.6% were married couples living together, 9.2% had a female householder with no husband present, and 28.4% were non-families. 22.0% of all households were made up of individuals, and 10.6% had someone living alone who was 65 years of age or older. The average household size was 2.62 and the average family size was 3.14.

In the city, the population was spread out, with 28.6% under the age of 18, 6.2% from 18 to 24, 30.5% from 25 to 44, 26.2% from 45 to 64, and 8.4% who were 65 years of age or older. The median age was 35 years. For every 100 females, there were 113.9 males. For every 100 females age 18 and over, there were 104.7 males.

The median income for a household in the city was $42,083, and the median income for a family was $48,333. Males had a median income of $34,500 versus $22,361 for females. The per capita income for the city was $17,502. About 1.0% of families and 4.3% of the population were below the poverty line, including 5.3% of those under age 18 and 7.1% of those age 65 or over.

== Education ==
It is within the Manvel Public School District 125.
