= North Dakota Highway 15 =

State highway in North Dakota, US

North Dakota Highway 15
- ND 15 highlighted in red

Route information
- Maintained by NDDOT
- Length: 134.137 mi (215.873 km)
- Existed: 1939–present

Major junctions
- West end: US 52 in Fessenden
- US 281 near New Rockford; US 281 in New Rockford; ND 1 in Pekin; ND 32 near McVille; ND 18 near Northwood
- East end: I-29 / US 81 / CR 81A near Thompson

Location
- Country: United States
- State: North Dakota
- Counties: Wells, Eddy, Nelson, Grand Forks

Highway system
- North Dakota State Highway System; Interstate; US; State
← ND 14	→ ND 16

North Dakota Highway 15 (ND 15) is a 134.137-mile-long (215.873 km) east–west state highway in central North Dakota. The western terminus is at U.S. Route 52 (US 52) in Fessenden and the eastern terminus is at Interstate 29 (I-29) and US 81 near Thompson. ND 15 was designated in 1939.

== Route description ==
North Dakota Highway 15 begins in Fessenden at an intersection with US 52 and travels east for about 5.5 miles (8.9 km) before beginning a concurrency with ND 30 for 4.5 miles (7.2 km). After the concurrency ends, ND 15 heads east for 7 miles (11 km) before leaving Wells County and entering Eddy County. Seven miles east of the county line, ND 15 begins a concurrency with US 281 and heads north for 2 miles (3.2 km) to enter the city of New Rockford. Just north of New Rockford, ND 15 turns east and travels about 25 miles (40 km) across nearly all of Eddy County to begin a concurrency with ND 20. The concurrency heads north for 8 miles (13 km) before ND 20 forks north and ND 15 forks east. 3 miles (4.8 km) farther east, the route enters Nelson County. 9 miles (14 km) east of the county line, ND 15 reaches the community of Pekin. East of Pekin, the highway intersects ND 1. About 7 miles (11 km) to the southeast of this intersection, ND 15 passes through McVille and about 9 miles (14 km) east of McVille, the highway has a junction with ND 32. The Nelson-Grand Forks county line is 5 miles (8.0 km) east of this intersection. 12 miles (19 km) into Grand Forks County, ND 15 begins a concurrency with ND 18. The route heads 8 miles (13 km) east during this concurrency, passing through Northwood. After the concurrency ends, the highway heads 7 miles (11 km) east, 2 miles (3.2 km) north, and 9 miles (14 km) east before entering Thompson, a southern suburb of Grand Forks. The highway ends 1 mile (1.6 km) east of Thompson at an interchange with Interstate 29 about 6 miles (9.7 km) west of the Red River of the North.

The only section of North Dakota Highway 15 that is included in the National Highway System is its concurrency with US 281, which is 3 miles (4.8 km) long. ND 15 is one of the less traveled highways in North Dakota, with average traffic in 2011 at about 200-600 vehicles per day with about 1000-2500 vehicles per day during its concurrency with US 281 and in Grand Forks County.

== History ==
ND 15 was designated in 1939. Since then, its routing has largely remained the same, but it has undergone some changes. Southeast of New Rockford, the route originally turned north and then west to enter New Rockford from the west. It has since been straightened to intersect US 281 south of town. Between just east of Pekin and the south side of Northwood, the highway stair-stepped along through Nelson and Grand Forks counties. To reduce the number of turns, the stair-stepping portion of the highway was straightened into a diagonal and a new alignment was built that passed to the north of Northwood. At Thompson, ND 15 originally turned north briefly before turning back to the east to meet US 81. Now the highway keeps going straight to its interchange with I-29 / US 81.

== Major intersections ==
County	Location	mi	km	Destinations	Notes
Wells	Fessenden	0.000	0.000	US 52 – Harvey, Carrington	Western terminus Roadway continues west as Old Highway 52
Wells		5.854	9.421	ND 30 north – Maddock	Western end of ND 30 concurrency
Wells		10.349	16.655	ND 30 south – Cathay	Eastern end of ND 30 concurrency
Eddy		24.280	39.075	US 281 south – Carrington	Southern end of US 281 concurrency
Eddy	New Rockford	27.226	43.816	US 281 north – Churchs Ferry	Northern end of US 281 concurrency
Eddy		52.329	84.215	ND 20 south – Jamestown	Southern end of ND 20 concurrency
Eddy		60.444	97.275	ND 20 north – Devils Lake	Northern end of ND 20 concurrency
Nelson		73.570	118.399	ND 1 – Lakota, Hannaford	
Nelson		89.872	144.635	ND 32 – Petersburg, Aneta	
Grand Forks		106.836	171.936	ND 18 north – Larimore	Western end of ND 18 concurrency
Grand Forks		114.902	184.917	ND 18 south – Hatton	Eastern end of ND 18 concurrency
Grand Forks		134.137	215.873	I-29 / US 81 – Grand Forks, Fargo	I-29/US 81 Exit 130. Eastern terminus Roadway continues east as Grand Forks County Road 81A
1.000 mi = 1.609 km; 1.000 km = 0.621 mi: Concurrency terminus
