= Niagara, North Dakota =

- City
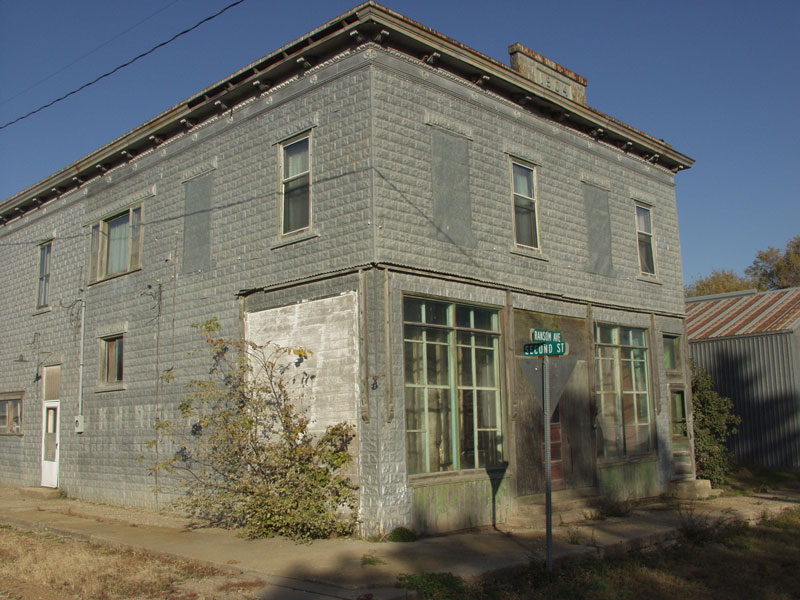
- At the corner of Ransom and Second

- Coordinates: 47°59′54″N 97°52′18″W
- Country: United States
- State: North Dakota
- County: Grand Forks
- Metro: Greater Grand Forks
- Founded: 1883

Area
  - Total: 0.97 sq mi (2.50 km^{2})
  - Land: 0.94 sq mi (2.43 km^{2})
  - Water: 0.027 sq mi (0.07 km^{2})
- Elevation: 1,434 ft (437 m)

Population (2020)
  - Total: 46
  - Estimate (2022): 42
  - Density: 49.0/sq mi (18.92/km^{2})
- Time zone: UTC-6 (Central (CST))
  - Summer (DST): UTC-5 (CDT)
- ZIP code: 58266
- Area code: 701
- FIPS code: 38-56780
- GNIS feature ID: 1036185

Niagara is a city in Grand Forks County, North Dakota, United States. It is part of the "Grand Forks, ND-MN Metropolitan Statistical Area" or "Greater Grand Forks". The population was 46 at the 2020 census. Niagara was founded in 1883.

== Geography ==
According to the United States Census Bureau, the city has a total area of 0.97 square miles (2.51 km^{2}), of which 0.94 square miles (2.43 km^{2}) is land and 0.03 square miles (0.08 km^{2}) is water.

== Demographics ==
Historical population
Census	Pop.	Note	%±
1900	392		—
1910	157		−59.9%
1920	199		26.8%
1930	207		4.0%
1940	179		−13.5%
1950	163		−8.9%
1960	157		−3.7%
1970	115		−26.8%
1980	76		−33.9%
1990	73		−3.9%
2000	57		−21.9%
2010	53		−7.0%
2020	46		−13.2%
2022 (est.)	42		−8.7%
U.S. Decennial Census; 2020 Census

=== 2010 census ===
As of the census of 2010, there were 53 people, 23 households, and 15 families living in the city. The population density was 56.4 inhabitants per square mile (21.8/km^{2}). There were 29 housing units at an average density of 30.9 per square mile (11.9/km^{2}). The racial makeup of the city was 98.1% White and 1.9% from two or more races. Hispanic or Latino of any race were 1.9% of the population.

There were 23 households, of which 39.1% had children under the age of 18 living with them, 52.2% were married couples living together, 13.0% had a male householder with no wife present, and 34.8% were non-families. 30.4% of all households were made up of individuals, and 21.7% had someone living alone who was 65 years of age or older. The average household size was 2.30 and the average family size was 2.87.

The median age in the city was 46.5 years. 24.5% of residents were under the age of 18; 5.7% were between the ages of 18 and 24; 18.9% were from 25 to 44; 32% were from 45 to 64; and 18.9% were 65 years of age or older. The gender makeup of the city was 58.5% male and 41.5% female.

=== 2000 census ===
As of the census of 2000, there were 57 people, 27 households, and 18 families living in the city. The population density was 61.2 inhabitants per square mile (23.6/km^{2}). There were 35 housing units at an average density of 37.6 per square mile (14.5/km^{2}). The racial makeup of the city was 94.74% White, 1.75% Native American, and 3.51% from two or more races.

There were 27 households, out of which 14.8% had children under the age of 18 living with them, 55.6% were married couples living together, 7.4% had a female householder with no husband present, and 33.3% were non-families. 25.9% of all households were made up of individuals, and 14.8% had someone living alone who was 65 years of age or older. The average household size was 2.11 and the average family size was 2.50.

In the city, the population was spread out, with 17.5% under the age of 18, 1.8% from 18 to 24, 22.8% from 25 to 44, 29.8% from 45 to 64, and 28.1% who were 65 years of age or older. The median age was 54 years. For every 100 females, there were 96.6 males. For every 100 females age 18 and over, there were 88.0 males.

The median income for a household in the city was $30,000, and the median income for a family was $31,250. Males had a median income of $20,625 versus $16,750 for females. The per capita income for the city was $16,206. There were no families and 6.4% of the population living below the poverty line, including no under eighteens and none of those over 64.

== Transportation ==
Amtrak’s Empire Builder, which operates between Seattle/Portland and Chicago, passes through the town on BNSF tracks, but makes no stop. The nearest station is located in Grand Forks, 39 miles (63 km) to the east.

== Education ==
It is within the Dakota Prairie Public School District 1.

== Notable people ==
- Eugene Butler (1849–1913), serial killer
