= Thompson, North Dakota =

- City
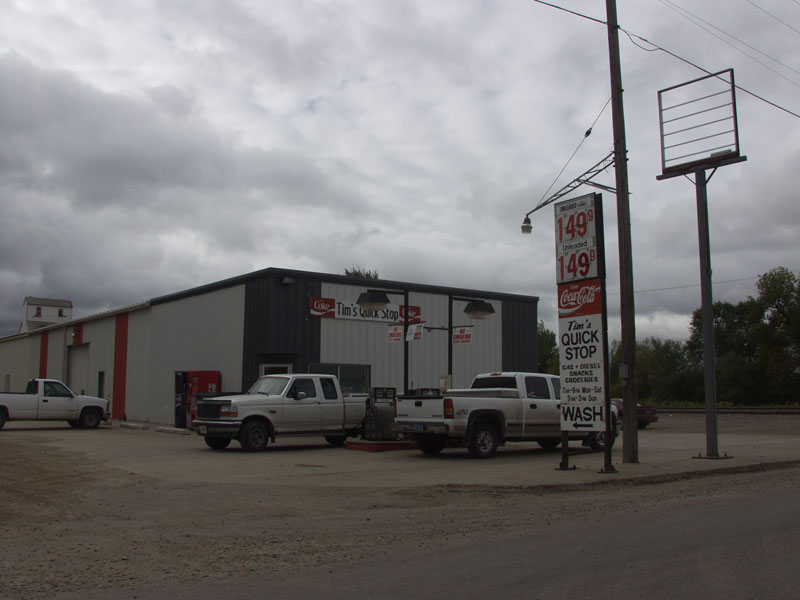
- S&T Quick Stop, the town's gas station and convenience store.
- Interactive location map of Thompson
- Coordinates: 47.774612°N 97.104357°W
- Country: United States
- State: North Dakota
- County: Grand Forks
- Metro: Greater Grand Forks
- Founded: 1881

Government
  - Mayor: Jeremy Hughes

Area
  - Total: 0.438 sq mi (1.134 km^{2})
  - Land: 0.432 sq mi (1.120 km^{2})
  - Water: 0.0058 sq mi (0.015 km^{2}) 1.37%
- Elevation: 869 ft (265 m)

Population (2020)
  - Total: 1,101
  - Estimate (2024): 1,091
  - Density: 2,546/sq mi (983.0/km^{2})
- Time zone: UTC–6 (Central (CST))
  - Summer (DST): UTC–5 (CDT)
- ZIP Code: 58278
- Area code: 701
- FIPS code: 38-78660
- GNIS feature ID: 1036294
- Highways: ND 15
- Website: cityofthompsonnd.com

Thompson is a city in Grand Forks County, North Dakota, United States. It is part of the Greater Grand Forks Metropolitan Statistical Area. It is located on the border of Allendale and Walle townships, with Walle on the east and Allendale on the west. The population was 1,101 at the 2020 census, and was estimated at 1,091 in 2024.

== History ==
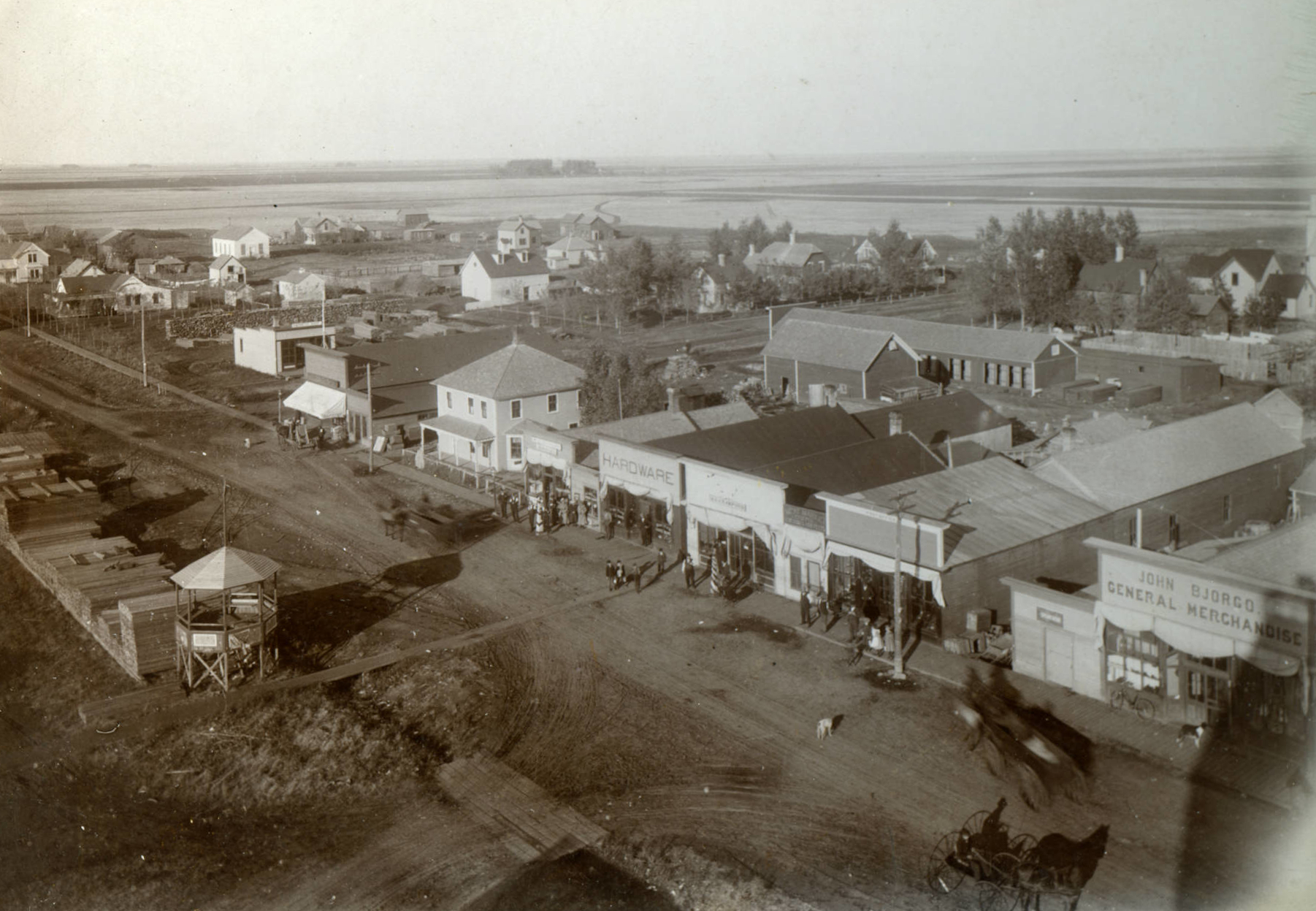
Elevated view of Thompson, North Dakota, 1890s

Thompson was founded in 1881.

The first residents of the town were businessmen who had come to support the needs of new settlers to the area. The town was first called Norton because the first buildings of the town were adjacent to land owned by George Norton. However, when the railroad came in 1881, the name caused an issue, since there was already a nearby town of Norton in Minnesota.

Albert Thompson, co-owner of a general store with his brother Robert, was commissioned postmaster in January 1881. The name of the town was then changed to Thompson in honor of Albert Thompson.

== Geography ==
According to the United States Census Bureau, the city has a total area of 0.438 square miles (1.13 km^{2}), of which 0.432 square miles (1.12 km^{2}) is land and 0.006 square miles (0.016 km^{2}) (1.37%) is water.

== Demographics ==
Historical population
Census	Pop.	Note	%±
1930	273		—
1940	276		1.1%
1950	270		−2.2%
1960	290		7.4%
1970	291		0.3%
1980	785		169.8%
1990	930		18.5%
2000	1,006		8.2%
2010	986		−2.0%
2020	1,101		11.7%
2024 (est.)	1,091		−0.9%
U.S. Decennial Census; 2020 Census

According to realtor website Zillow, the average price of a home as of October 31, 2025, in Thompson is $356,166.

As of the 2023 American Community Survey, there are 412 estimated households in Thompson with an average of 2.65 persons per household. The city has a median household income of $110,909. Approximately 1.0% of the city's population lives at or below the poverty line. Thompson has an estimated 75.3% employment rate, with 39.7% of the population holding a bachelor's degree or higher and 98.1% holding a high school diploma. There were 439 housing units at an average density of 1,016.20 per square mile (392.4/km^{2}).

The top five reported languages (people were allowed to report up to two languages, thus the figures will generally add to more than 100%) were English (99.1%), Spanish (0.7%), Indo-European (0.0%), Asian and Pacific Islander (0.2%), and Other (0.0%).

The median age in the city was 44.5 years.

Thompson, North Dakota – racial and ethnic composition Note: the US Census treats Hispanic/Latino as an ethnic category. This table excludes Latinos from the racial categories and assigns them to a separate category. Hispanics/Latinos may be of any race.
Race / ethnicity (NH = non-Hispanic)	Number	Percentage
White (NH)	1,004	91.19%
Black or African American (NH)	1	0.09%
Native American or Alaska Native (NH)	4	0.36%
Asian (NH)	1	0.09%
Pacific Islander (NH)	1	0.09%
Some Other Race (NH)	4	0.36%
Mixed/Multi-Racial (NH)	48	4.36%
Hispanic or Latino	38	3.45%
Total	1,101	100.00%

=== 2020 census ===
As of the 2020 census, there were 1,101 people, 387 households, and 319 families residing in the city. The population density was 2,352.56 inhabitants per square mile (908.3/km^{2}). There were 396 housing units at an average density of 846.15 per square mile (326.7/km^{2}). The racial makeup of the city was 92.55% White, 0.09% African American, 0.64% Native American, 0.09% Asian, 0.09% Pacific Islander, 1.00% from some other races and 5.54% from two or more races. Hispanic or Latino people of any race were 3.45% of the population.

=== 2010 census ===
As of the 2010 census, there were 986 people, 356 households, and 293 families living in the city. The population density was 2,143.5 inhabitants per square mile (827.6/km^{2}). There were 362 housing units at an average density of 787.0 per square mile (303.9/km^{2}). The racial makeup of the city was 98.07% White, 0.30% African American, 1.01% Native American, 0.10% Asian, 0.00% Pacific Islander, 0.10% from some other races and 0.41% from two or more races. Hispanic or Latino people of any race were 0.91% of the population.

There were 356 households, of which 42.1% had children under the age of 18 living with them, 73.0% were married couples living together, 7.0% had a female householder with no husband present, 2.2% had a male householder with no wife present, and 17.7% were non-families. 14.9% of all households were made up of individuals, and 4.8% had someone living alone who was 65 years of age or older. The average household size was 2.77 and the average family size was 3.04.

The median age in the city was 36.8 years. 28.4% of residents were under the age of 18; 6.9% were between the ages of 18 and 24; 27.2% were from 25 to 44; 30.5% were from 45 to 64; and 7.1% were 65 years of age or older. The gender makeup of the city was 51.0% male and 49.0% female.

=== 2000 census ===
As of the 2000 census, there were 1,006 people, 329 households, and 273 families living in the city. The population density was 2,177.6 inhabitants per square mile (840.8/km^{2}). There were 339 housing units at an average density of 733.8 per square mile (283.3/km^{2}). The racial makeup of the city was 97.71% White, 0.40% African American, 0.10% Native American, 0.70% Asian, 0.20% from other races, and 0.89% from two or more races. Hispanic or Latino people of any race were 0.80% of the population.

There were 329 households, out of which 53.2% had children under the age of 18 living with them, 74.5% were married couples living together, 4.3% had a female householder with no husband present, and 17.0% were non-families. 15.2% of all households were made up of individuals, and 6.4% had someone living alone who was 65 years of age or older. The average household size was 3.06 and the average family size was 3.43.

In the city, the population was spread out, with 34.9% under the age of 18, 6.3% from 18 to 24, 33.4% from 25 to 44, 19.8% from 45 to 64, and 5.7% who were 65 years of age or older. The median age was 33 years. For every 100 females, there were 105.7 males. For every 100 females aged 18 and over, there were 97.9 males.

The median income for a household in the city was $54,514, and the median income for a family was $57,250. Males had a median income of $35,682 versus $21,298 for females. The per capita income for the city was $19,857. None of the families and 0.7% of the population were living below the poverty line, including no under eighteens and 7.7% of those over 64.

== Transportation ==
Amtrak’s Empire Builder, which operates between Seattle/Portland and Chicago, passes through the town on BNSF tracks, but makes no stop. The nearest station is located in Grand Forks, 14 miles (23 km) to the north.

== Education ==
It is within the Thompson Public School District 61.

== Notable people ==
- Greg Brockman, Open AI President
