= U.S. Route 2 in North Dakota =

Section of U.S. Highway in North Dakota, United States

U.S. Highway 2
- US 2 highlighted in red

Route information
- Maintained by NDDOT
- Length: 358.090 mi (576.290 km)
- Existed: 1926–present

Major junctions
- West end: US 2 at the Montana state line near Bainville, MT
- US 85 in Williston; US 52 at Minot; US 83 in Minot; US 281 near Churchs Ferry; I-29 / US 81 in Grand Forks
- East end: US 2 at the Minnesota state line in Grand Forks

Location
- Country: United States
- State: North Dakota
- Counties: Williams, Mountrail, Ward, McHenry, Pierce, Benson, Ramsey, Nelson, Grand Forks

Highway system
- United States Numbered Highway System; List; Special; Divided; North Dakota State Highway System; Interstate; US; State
← ND 1	→ ND 3

U.S. Highway 2 (US 2) is a 358.090-mile-long (576.290 km) United States Numbered Highway in North Dakota, which runs from the Montana state line east to the Red River at Grand Forks. The route connects the cities of Williston, Minot, Devils Lake, and Grand Forks. Of the 358 miles (576 km) of US 2 in North Dakota, all but the westernmost 12 miles (19 km) have four lanes. In general, the route parallels the original Great Northern Railway, which served the aforementioned cities.

== Route description ==
Highway 2 near Tioga

US 2 is an east–west highway that runs through North Dakota's northern tier of larger cities: Williston, Minot, Devils Lake, and Grand Forks. These cities are about 75 to 100 miles (121 to 161 km) north of North Dakota's southern tier of larger cities located on Interstate 94 (I-94): Dickinson, Bismarck–Mandan, Jamestown, and Fargo–West Fargo. Each city (or pair) in each tier is separated by about 75 to 125 miles (121 to 201 km).

US 2 intersects two north–south four-lane highways in North Dakota: US 83 at Minot and I-29 at Grand Forks. In addition, it junctions with four other U.S. Highways that, except for shorter stretches that are four lanes, are mostly two-lane highways in North Dakota: US 85 at Williston (which is in the process of being converted into an undivided four-lane south of Williston), US 52 at Minot, US 281 at Churchs Ferry (west of Devils Lake), and US 81 at Grand Forks. All six of these highways provide routes either to the border at Mexico or deep into the southern U.S.

Between Williston and Minot, US 2 provides several high points where one can view graceful and beautiful landscape for many miles in all directions. Between Minot and Grand Forks, US 2 provides an ever-changing mix of agricultural farm and pasture land, native wetlands, and small lakes set on a gently rolling landscape. US 2 also passes near a large lake named Devils Lake near the city with the same name. Throughout the state, the route generally travels east–west, following the route of the Great Northern Railway, which is also used by the Empire Builder. The US 2 route through North Dakota was originally named the Wonderland Trail or the Teddy Roosevelt Trail, after the former U.S. president.

In Rugby, just east of the route's intersection with North Dakota Highway 3 (ND 3), the highway passes the location designated in 1931 as the geographical center of North America. The monument marking the geographic center of the continent had to be relocated in 1971 when US 2 was widened from two to four lanes.

The elevation of the highway at the Montana border is approximately 2,250 feet (690 m) above sea level, and approximately 800 feet (240 m) at its crossing of the north-flowing Red River, entering Minnesota at East Grand Forks.

== History ==
US 2 in North Dakota has undergone significant upgrades over the years, as the state converted large portions of the highway from two lanes to four lanes to enhance safety and accommodate growing traffic demands. The project has been executed in stages over several decades.

The first major section to be upgraded was the stretch from Grand Forks to Minot. This portion was completed in 1996, resulting in a continuous four-lane highway across this vital east-west corridor in the eastern part of the state. The completion of this section was a significant milestone in North Dakota's long-term plan to improve its transportation infrastructure.

Following the completion of the Grand Forks to Minot segment, attention turned to the highway west of Minot. The section from Minot to Williston was upgraded as part of a campaign labeled "Across the State in Two Thousand Eight." This project, which began a few years prior, aimed to complete the four-lane upgrade by 2008. The state successfully met this goal, resulting in approximately 343 miles (552 km) of continuous four-lane highway stretching from North Dakota's eastern border to just past Williston.

Despite these extensive upgrades, a small segment of US 2, approximately 12 miles (19 km) from Williston to the Montana state line, remains a two-lane highway. The North Dakota state government has indicated a willingness to convert this remaining segment to four lanes, contingent upon Montana's agreement to continue the four-lane expansion from the state line into Montana. This potential project highlights the importance of interstate collaboration in regional infrastructure development.

== Major intersections ==
County	Location	mi	km	Destinations	Notes
Williams		0.000	0.000	US 2 west (Theodore Roosevelt Expressway) – Wolf Point, Glasgow	Continuation into Montana
Williams		12.449	20.035	ND 1804 west – Trenton, Fairview	West end of ND 1804 concurrency
Williams		14.919	24.010	US 85 – Watford City	Williston Bypass; east end of Theodore Roosevelt Expressway
Williams	Williston	17.923	28.844	US 2 Bus. east / ND 1804 east (2nd Street W)	East end of ND 1804 concurrency; former US 85 Bus.
Williams	Williston	20.383	32.803	US 2 Bus. west (2nd Avenue W)	Eastern terminus of US 2 Bus., former US 85 Bus.
Williams	Williston	25.674	41.318	US 85 south / US 85B south – Epping Springbrook Dam, Springbrook	Williston Bypass; west end of US 85 concurrency, northern terminus of US 85B
Williams		32.441	52.209	US 85 north – Fortuna	East end of US 85 concurrency
Williams		64.207	103.331	ND 40 north – Tioga	Southern terminus of ND 40
Mountrail	Stanley	90.664	145.910	ND 8 – Bowbells, New Town	
Ward	Berthold	123.407	198.604	ND 28 north – Carpio	Southern terminus of ND 28
Ward		134.397	216.291	US 52 west – Kenmare, Portal	West end of US 52 concurrency
Ward	Minot	143.882	231.556	US 83 Byp. north – Air Base	North end of US 83 Byp. concurrency
Ward	Minot	144.326	232.270	US 2 Bus. east / US 52 Bus. east (W Burdick Expressway)	Western terminus of US 2 Bus. and US 52 Bus.
Ward	Minot	146.366	235.553	US 83 (S Broadway Street) – Air Base, Bismarck	South end of US 83 Byp. concurrency
Ward	Minot	148.753	239.395	US 52 east / US 52 Bus. west (Valley Street) – Jamestown	East end of US 52 concurrency, eastern terminus of US 52 Bus.
Ward	Minot	150.841	242.755	US 2 Bus. west (E Burdick Expressway) – Minot	Eastern terminus of US 2 Bus.
McHenry		164.236	264.312	ND 41 south – Velva	Northern terminus of ND 41
McHenry		188.118	302.747	ND 14 south – Drake	West end of ND 14 concurrency
McHenry	Towner	191.834	308.727	ND 14 north (Main Street) – Upham	East end of ND 14 concurrency
Pierce	Rugby	210.880	339.378	ND 3 (3rd Avenue SW) – Dunseith, Harvey	
Benson		233.427	375.664	ND 30 south – Harlow, Maddock	Northern terminus of ND 30
Benson		245.703	395.421	US 281 south – Minnewaukan	West end of US 281 concurrency
Benson		248.758	400.337	US 281 north – Cando	East end of US 281 concurrency
Ramsey	Churchs Ferry	249.961	402.273	US 281 Bus. north (66th Avenue NE) – Churchs Ferry	Southern terminus of US 281 Bus.
Ramsey	Devils Lake	268.630	432.318	ND 19 (4th Street NW) – Business District, Minnewaukan	
Ramsey	Devils Lake	269.354	433.483	ND 20 (College Drive N) – Starkweather, Camp Grafton, Fort Totten	
Nelson	Lakota	295.468	475.510	ND 1 (6th Street E) – Langdon, Pekin	
Nelson	Michigan	305.622	491.851	ND 35 north – Michigan, Whitman	Southern terminus of ND 35
Nelson	Petersburg	312.050	502.196	ND 32 south – Aneta	West end of ND 32 concurrency
Grand Forks	Niagara	317.512	510.986	ND 32 north – Edinburg	East end of ND 32 concurrency
Grand Forks		330.520	531.920	ND 18 – Larimore, Cavalier	
Grand Forks	Grand Forks	355.479	572.088	I-29 / US 81 – Fargo, Winnipeg	Exit 141 on I-29
Grand Forks	Grand Forks	357.460	575.276	US 81 Bus. (N Washington Street) – Grafton	
Grand Forks	Grand Forks	357.539	575.403	US 2 Bus. east (N 5th Street)	Western terminus of US 2 Bus.
Red River of the North		358.090	576.290	North Dakota–Minnesota state line	
Red River of the North		358.090	576.290	US 2 east – East Grand Forks, Crookston	Continuation into Minnesota
1.000 mi = 1.609 km; 1.000 km = 0.621 mi: Concurrency terminus

== See also ==
U.S. Route 2
Previous state: Montana	North Dakota	Next state: Minnesota
