= Larimore, North Dakota =

- City
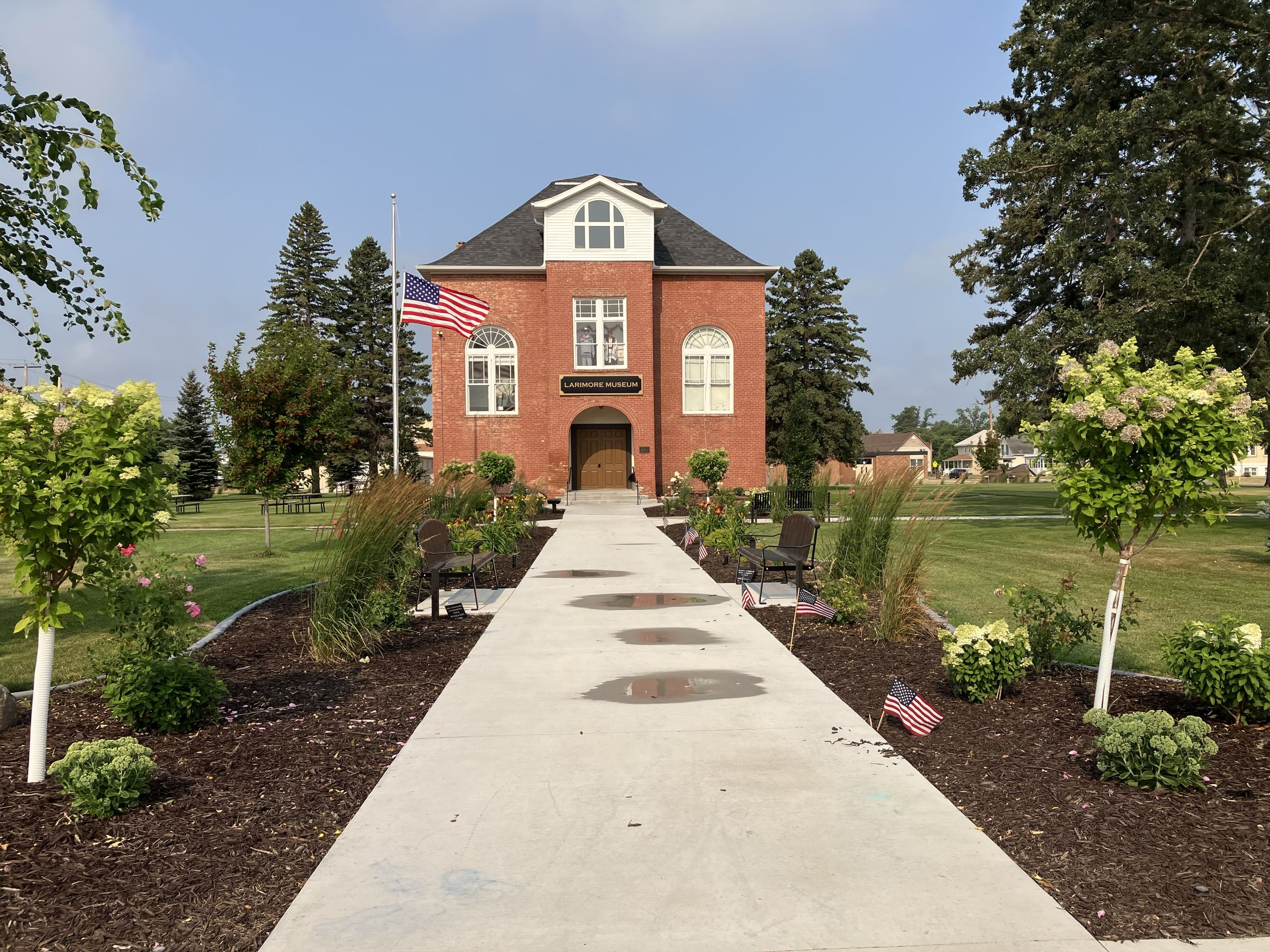
- Larimore Museum

- Location of Larimore, North Dakota
- Coordinates: 47°54′30″N 97°37′35″W
- Country: United States
- State: North Dakota
- County: Grand Forks
- Metro: Greater Grand Forks
- Founded: 1881

Government
  - Mayor: Dean Elfman

Area
  - Total: 0.60 sq mi (1.56 km^{2})
  - Land: 0.60 sq mi (1.56 km^{2})
  - Water: 0 sq mi (0.00 km^{2})
- Elevation: 1,132 ft (345 m)

Population (2020)
  - Total: 1,260
  - Estimate (2022): 1,223
  - Density: 2,095.3/sq mi (809.01/km^{2})
- Time zone: UTC-6 (Central (CST))
  - Summer (DST): UTC-5 (CDT)
- ZIP code: 58251
- Area code: 701
- FIPS code: 38-45020
- GNIS feature ID: 1036120
- Highways: ND 18
- Website: larimorend.com

Larimore is a city in Grand Forks County, North Dakota, United States. It is located three miles south of the junction of U.S. Route 2 and North Dakota Highway 18. Larimore is part of the Greater Grand Forks Metropolitan Statistical Area. The population was 1,260 at the 2020 census.

== History ==
Larimore was founded in 1881, following construction of the railroad through the territory. It is named for N. G. Larimore, who owned a large farm in the area.

== Geography ==
According to the United States Census Bureau, the city has a total area of 0.59 square miles (1.53 km^{2}), all land.

=== Climate ===
Climate data for Larimore, North Dakota (1991-2020)
Month	Jan	Feb	Mar	Apr	May	Jun	Jul	Aug	Sep	Oct	Nov	Dec	Year
Mean daily maximum °F (°C)	16.1 (−8.8)	21.0 (−6.1)	33.8 (1.0)	51.3 (10.7)	66.1 (18.9)	75.9 (24.4)	79.8 (26.6)	79.5 (26.4)	70.6 (21.4)	54.4 (12.4)	36.2 (2.3)	22.2 (−5.4)	50.6 (10.3)
Daily mean °F (°C)	6.0 (−14.4)	11.2 (−11.6)	23.9 (−4.5)	39.7 (4.3)	54.1 (12.3)	64.3 (17.9)	68.6 (20.3)	66.7 (19.3)	57.7 (14.3)	43.1 (6.2)	27.3 (−2.6)	13.9 (−10.1)	39.7 (4.3)
Mean daily minimum °F (°C)	−4.0 (−20.0)	1.4 (−17.0)	14.0 (−10.0)	28.1 (−2.2)	42.1 (5.6)	52.8 (11.6)	57.3 (14.1)	53.9 (12.2)	44.9 (7.2)	31.9 (−0.1)	18.3 (−7.6)	5.7 (−14.6)	28.9 (−1.7)
Source: NCEI

== Demographics ==
Historical population
Census	Pop.	Note	%±
1890	553		—
1900	1,235		123.3%
1910	1,224		−0.9%
1920	1,089		−11.0%
1930	979		−10.1%
1940	1,222		24.8%
1950	1,374		12.4%
1960	1,714		24.7%
1970	1,469		−14.3%
1980	1,524		3.7%
1990	1,464		−3.9%
2000	1,433		−2.1%
2010	1,346		−6.1%
2020	1,260		−6.4%
2022 (est.)	1,223		−2.9%
U.S. Decennial Census; 2020 Census

=== 2010 census ===
As of the census of 2010, there were 1,346 people, 552 households, and 358 families residing in the city. The population density was 2,281.4 inhabitants per square mile (880.9/km^{2}). There were 623 housing units at an average density of 1,055.9 per square mile (407.7/km^{2}). The racial makeup of the city was 92.3% White, 0.8% African American, 1.6% Native American, 0.4% Asian, 2.7% from other races, and 2.2% from two or more races. Hispanic or Latino of any race were 4.2% of the population.

There were 552 households, of which 29.5% had children under the age of 18 living with them, 53.3% were married couples living together, 7.6% had a female householder with no husband present, 4.0% had a male householder with no wife present, and 35.1% were non-families. 30.8% of all households were made up of individuals, and 10.1% had someone living alone who was 65 years of age or older. The average household size was 2.37 and the average family size was 2.96.

The median age in the city was 41.6 years. 23.7% of residents were under the age of 18; 6.9% were between the ages of 18 and 24; 23.9% were from 25 to 44; 27.5% were from 45 to 64; and 18.1% were 65 years of age or older. The gender makeup of the city was 48.1% male and 51.9% female.

=== 2000 census ===
As of the census of 2000, there were 1,433 people, 576 households, and 377 families residing in the city. The population density was 2,368.0 inhabitants per square mile (914.3/km^{2}). There were 620 housing units at an average density of 1,024.5 per square mile (395.6/km^{2}). The racial makeup of the city was 96.09% White, 0.70% African American, 1.47% Native American, 0.63% Asian, 0.21% from other races, and 0.91% from two or more races. Hispanic or Latino of any race were 1.12% of the population.

There were 576 households, out of which 32.8% had children under the age of 18 living with them, 54.5% were married couples living together, 7.6% had a female householder with no husband present, and 34.5% were non-families. 30.7% of all households were made up of individuals, and 16.3% had someone living alone who was 65 years of age or older. The average household size was 2.42 and the average family size was 3.06.

In the city, the population was spread out, with 27.8% under the age of 18, 5.4% from 18 to 24, 27.4% from 25 to 44, 19.4% from 45 to 64, and 20.2% who were 65 years of age or older. The median age was 39 years. For every 100 females, there were 91.8 males. For every 100 females age 18 and over, there were 90.5 males.

The median income for a household in the city was $33,292, and the median income for a family was $40,542. Males had a median income of $29,375 versus $20,417 for females. The per capita income for the city was $16,271. About 6.1% of families and 7.4% of the population were below the poverty line, including 8.6% of those under age 18 and 10.7% of those age 65 or over.

== Business and culture ==
Unlike many of small towns in North Dakota, Larimore has maintained a relatively stable population for the last forty years. Its close proximity to employment opportunities in Grand Forks and at the Grand Forks Air Force Base have cause many commuters to take up residence.

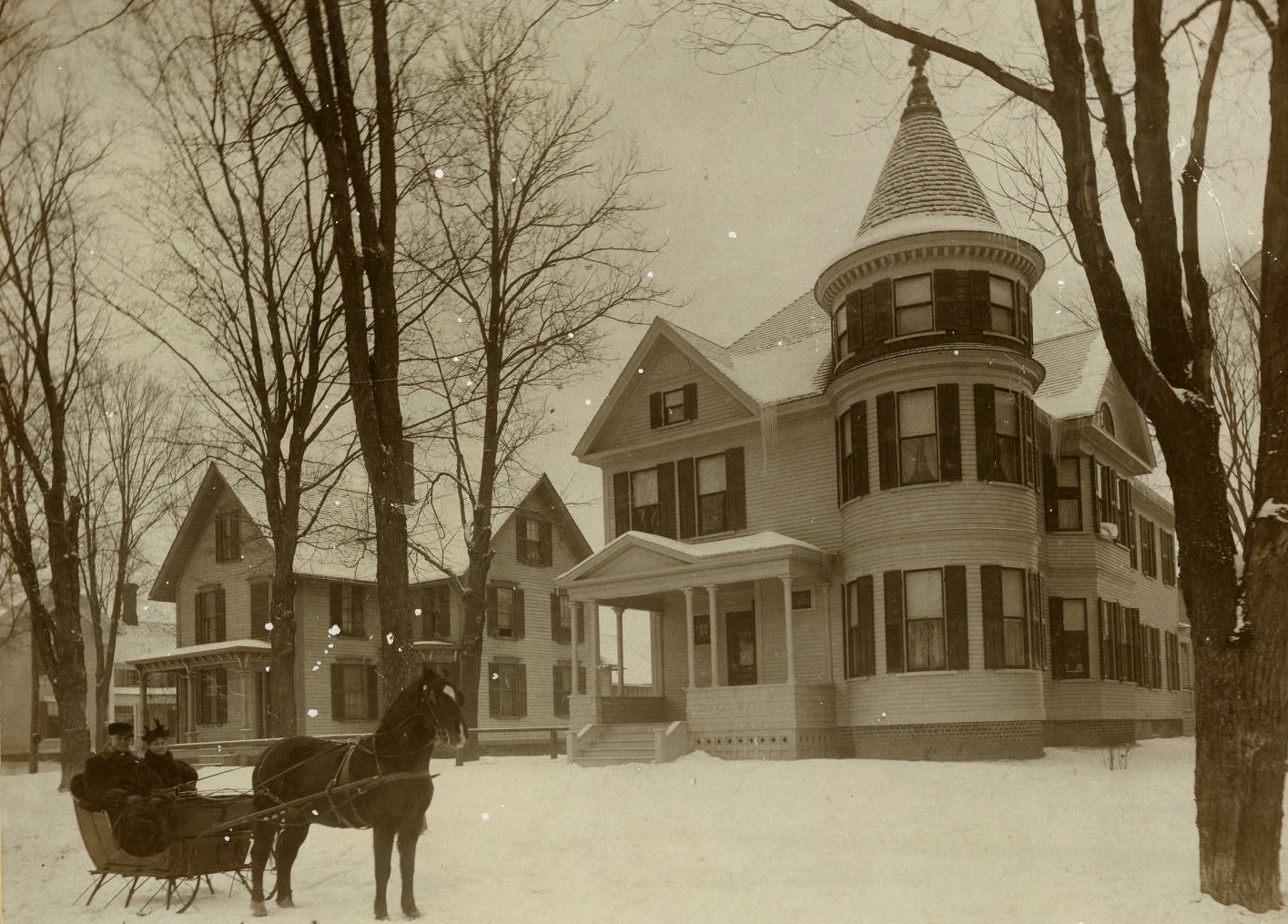
Piatt house in Larimore, North Dakota, 1890s

In the rural areas surrounding Larimore, population density is higher east of the town than west. Once mostly populated by yeoman farmers, many of these homestead farms are now horse ranches, hobby farms, or homesteads without notable agrarian use.

Although Larimore's residential population is largely unchanged, commercial business declined through the final decades of the 20th century. Downturns in the farm economy and increased shopping options in larger, nearby cities such as Grand Forks led to many business closures in Larimore. The business district has since "bottomed out" and many of the once abandoned buildings have either been renovated for other uses or demolished and replaced with new structures. Abandoned lots and empty, deteriorating buildings still dot much of the downtown area of Larimore.

== Education ==
It is within the Larimore Public School District 44.

== Transportation ==
Amtrak’s Empire Builder, which operates between Seattle/Portland and Chicago, passes through the town on BNSF tracks, but makes no stop. The nearest station is located in Grand Forks, 28 miles (45 km) to the east.

== Notable people ==
- Truck Hannah, was a Major League Baseball catcher for the New York Yankees, born in Larimore in 1889
- Clint Hill, United States Secret Service agent who was in the presidential motorcade during the assassination of John F. Kennedy. Hill was born in Larimore in 1932
- Vonne Lester, actress
- LeRoy Mason, was a movie actor, born in Larimore in 1903
- Eli C. D. Shortridge, third governor of North Dakota from 1893 to 1895, was a resident of Larimore

== Sites of interest ==
- Turtle River State Park – one of the largest state parks in eastern North Dakota
- Larimore City Hall – Historic former city hall building. Now houses a community museum.
- Larimore Dam – a recreational area along a reservoir on the Turtle River. Attractions include a beach, fishing, camping, and swimming.
- Myra Arboretum

== Climate ==
This climatic region is typified by large seasonal temperature differences, with warm to hot (and often humid) summers and cold (sometimes severely cold) winters. According to the Köppen Climate Classification system, Larimore has a humid continental climate, abbreviated "Dfb" on climate maps.
