= Northwood, North Dakota =

- City
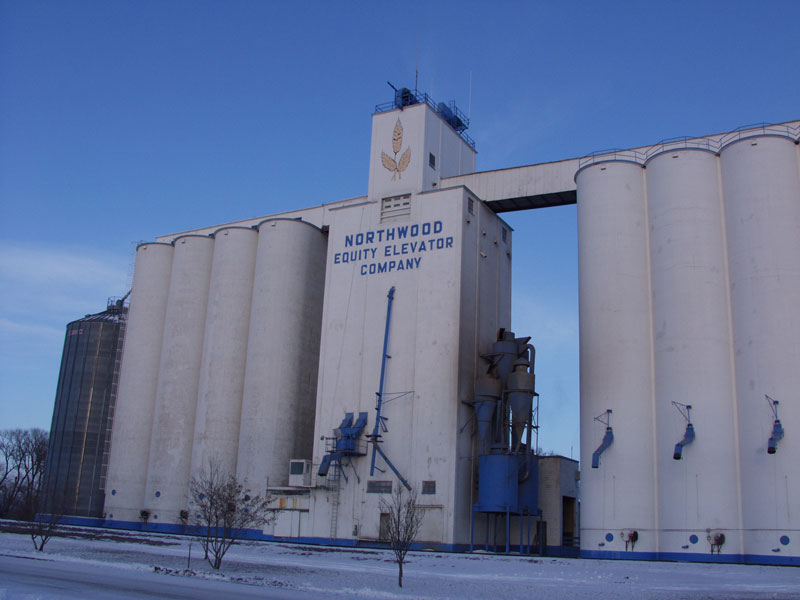
- The Northwood grain elevators

- Logo
- Motto: "Come Discover Northwood This is the place for you!"
- Location of Northwood, North Dakota
- Coordinates: 47°44′5″N 97°34′8″W
- Country: United States
- State: North Dakota
- County: Grand Forks
- Metro: Greater Grand Forks
- Founded: 1884

Government
  - Mayor: Karl Broeren

Area
  - Total: 1.21 sq mi (3.13 km^{2})
  - Land: 1.21 sq mi (3.13 km^{2})
  - Water: 0 sq mi (0.00 km^{2})
- Elevation: 1,120 ft (340 m)

Population (2020)
  - Total: 982
  - Estimate (2022): 946
  - Density: 812.5/sq mi (313.71/km^{2})
- Time zone: UTC-6 (Central (CST))
  - Summer (DST): UTC-5 (CDT)
- ZIP code: 58267
- Area code: 701
- FIPS code: 38-58300
- GNIS feature ID: 1036204
- Website: www.northwoodnd.org

Northwood is a city in Grand Forks County, North Dakota, United States. It is part of the "Grand Forks, ND-MN Metropolitan Statistical Area" or "Greater Grand Forks." The population was 982 at the 2020 census.

== History ==
Northwood was founded in 1884.

A tornado, rated EF4 on the Enhanced Fujita Scale, struck Northwood on the evening of August 26, 2007 causing destruction to the entire town and killing one person. Later on some of the buildings were burned, collapsed, or torn down because of severe damage to the buildings from the tornado.

== Geography ==
According to the United States Census Bureau, the city has a total area of 1.27 square miles (3.29 km^{2}), all land.

== Demographics ==
Historical population
Census	Pop.	Note	%±
1890	268		—
1900	697		160.1%
1910	769		10.3%
1920	935		21.6%
1930	971		3.9%
1940	1,068		10.0%
1950	1,182		10.7%
1960	1,195		1.1%
1970	1,189		−0.5%
1980	1,240		4.3%
1990	1,166		−6.0%
2000	959		−17.8%
2010	945		−1.5%
2020	982		3.9%
2022 (est.)	946		−3.7%
U.S. Decennial Census; 2020 Census

Northwood has the highest percentage of Norwegian American ancestry of any city in the United States.

=== 2010 census ===
As of the census of 2010, there were 945 people, 397 households, and 243 families living in the city. The population density was 744.1 inhabitants per square mile (287.3/km^{2}). There were 443 housing units at an average density of 348.8 per square mile (134.7/km^{2}). The racial makeup of the city was 98.0% White, 0.1% African American, 0.1% Native American, 0.2% Asian, 0.1% from other races, and 1.5% from two or more races. Hispanic or Latino of any race were 0.4% of the population.

There were 397 households, of which 27.5% had children under the age of 18 living with them, 49.4% were married couples living together, 6.3% had a female householder with no husband present, 5.5% had a male householder with no wife present, and 38.8% were non-families. 36.8% of all households were made up of individuals, and 20.7% had someone living alone who was 65 years of age or older. The average household size was 2.23 and the average family size was 2.91.

The median age in the city was 45.3 years. 23.6% of residents were under the age of 18; 5.3% were between the ages of 18 and 24; 20.6% were from 25 to 44; 24% were from 45 to 64; and 26.6% were 65 years of age or older. The gender makeup of the city was 50.2% male and 49.8% female.

=== 2000 census ===
As of the census of 2000, there were 959 people, 408 households, and 243 families living in the city. The population density was 923.1 inhabitants per square mile (356.4/km^{2}). There were 459 housing units at an average density of 441.8 per square mile (170.6/km^{2}). The racial makeup of the city was 99.17% White, 0.10% African American, 0.10% Native American, 0.10% Asian, 0.10% from other races, and 0.42% from two or more races. Hispanic or Latino of any race were 0.73% of the population.

Of the 408 households, 25.0% had children under the age of 18 living with them, 53.2% were married couples living together, 4.4% had a female householder with no husband present, and 40.2% were non-families. 38.2% of all households were made up of individuals, and 22.3% had someone living alone who was 65 years of age or older. The average household size was 2.17 and the average family size was 2.85.

In the city, the population was spread out, with 20.8% under the age of 18, 4.4% from 18 to 24, 22.3% from 25 to 44, 24.6% from 45 to 64, and 27.9% who were 65 years of age or older. The median age was 48 years. For every 100 females, there were 91.0 males. For every 100 females age 18 and over, there were 81.0 males.

The median income for a household in the city was $33,000, and the median income for a family was $41,667. Males had a median income of $31,389 versus $21,389 for females. The per capita income for the city was $17,923. About 2.8% of families and 5.8% of the population were below the poverty line, including 2.4% of those under age 18 and 8.3% of those age 65 or over.

== Education ==
It is within the Northwood Public School District 129.
