= Scandia Township =

Scandia Township may refer to the following townships in the United States:

- Scandia Township, Polk County, Minnesota
- Scandia Township, Bottineau County, North Dakota
- Scandia Township, Republic County, Kansas

== See also ==
- Scandia Valley Township, Morrison County, Minnesota
- New Scandia Township, MN
