= Bentinck Township, Bottineau County, North Dakota =

Bentinck Township
- Township
- Location of Bentinck Township
- Coordinates: 48°53′00″N 101°07′02″W
- Country: United States
- State: North Dakota
- County: Bottineau
- Organized: 1905

Area
  - Total: 36.00 sq mi (93.2 km^{2})
  - Land: 35.75 sq mi (92.6 km^{2})
  - Water: 0.25 sq mi (0.65 km^{2})
- Elevation: 1,509 ft (460 m)

Population (2020)
  - Total: 41
  - Density: 1.1/sq mi (0.44/km^{2})
- Time zone: UTC-6 (Central (CST))
  - Summer (DST): UTC-5 (CDT)
- Area code: 701
- FIPS code: 38-06020
- GNIS feature ID: 1759266

Bentinck Township is a township in Bottineau County in the U.S. state of North Dakota. Its population during the 2020 Census was 41.

== History ==
Bentinck Township was organized in 1905.

== Geography ==
Bentinck Township is located in the western part of Bottineau County in survey township T162 North, Range 81 West. According to the United States Census Bureau, the township has a total area of 36.00 square miles (93.2 km^{2}), 99% of which is land. The nearest cities are Westhope to the northeast and Maxbass to the south.

== Demographics ==
The 2000 Census reported there were 32 people, 12 households, and 11 families residing in the township. The population density was 0.9 square miles (2.3 km^{2}). There were 17 housing units at an average density of 0.5 square miles (1.3 km^{2}). The racial makeup of the township was 100% White. Norwegian was the largest ancestry group in the township, at 48.6%.

Of the 12 households in the township, only 16.7% had children under the age of 18 living with them. married couples made up 91.7% of the population. Just one household (8.3%) was a non-family household. The average household size was 2.67 people.

84% of the township was under the age of 65 at the 2000 Census, with children under the age of 18 making up 20% of the population. The largest group was 45- to 64-year-olds, with 40.6%, followed by 25- to 44-year-olds (18.8%) and those over 65 (15.6%). Just 3.1% of the population was made up of 18- to 24-year-olds. The median age was 48 years.

The median household income for the township was $46,250, and the median family income was $52,500. Males had a median income of $56,250 versus $13,750 for females, with a per capita income of $16,938.

Historical population
Census	Pop.	Note	%±
1900	113		—
1910	197		74.3%
1920	152		−22.8%
1930	134		−11.8%
1940	133		−0.7%
1950	143		7.5%
1960	74		−48.3%
1970	62		−16.2%
1980	85		37.1%
1990	52		−38.8%
2000	32		−38.5%
2010	36		12.5%
2020	41		13.9%
