= Antler, North Dakota =

- City
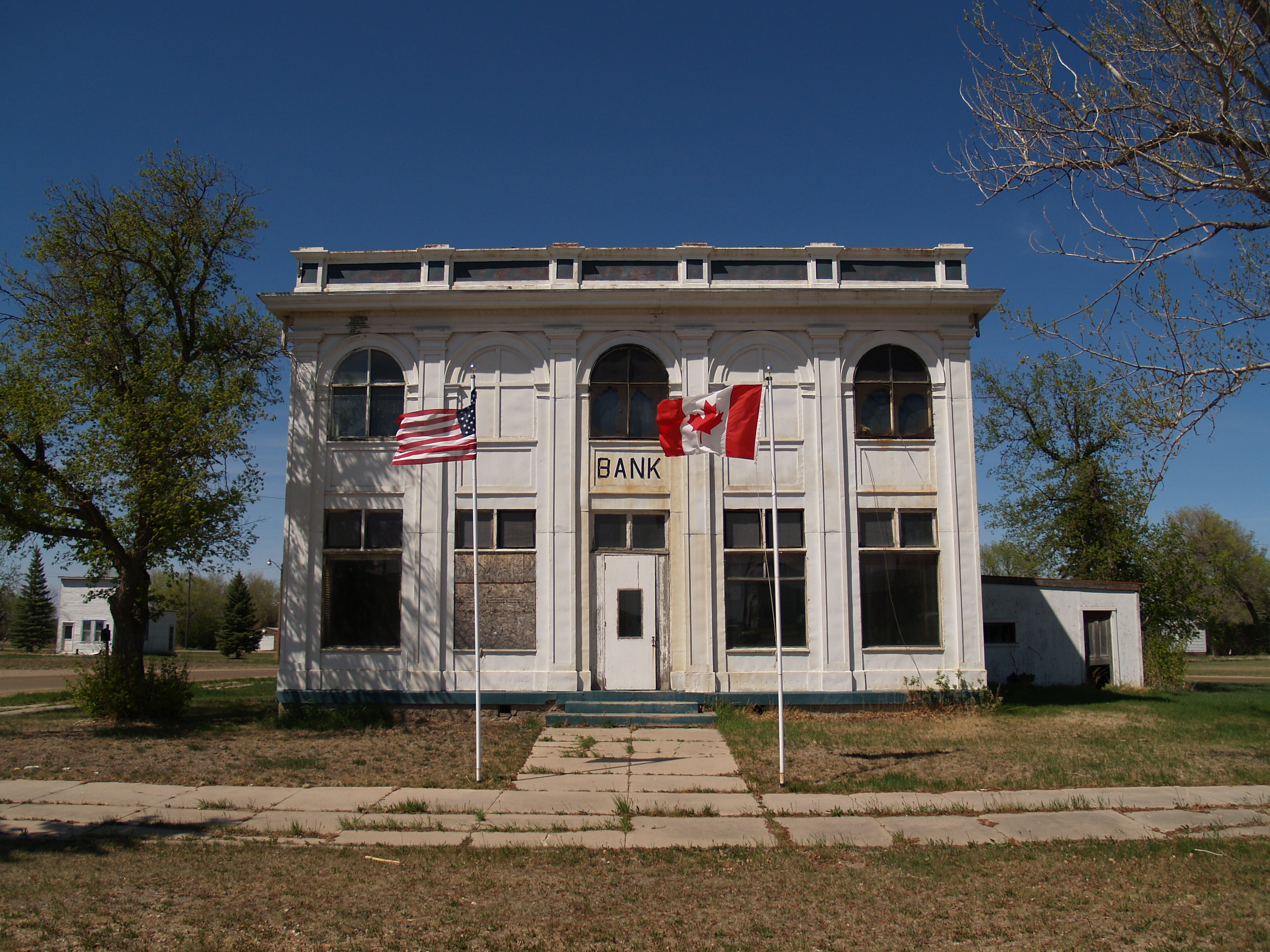
- Former U.S. Customs house in Antler
- Interactive map of Antler, North Dakota
- Location within North Dakota
- Coordinates: 48.9713°N 101.2832°W
- Country: United States
- State: North Dakota
- County: Bottineau
- Founded: 1905
- Incorporated: April 3, 1906

Government
  - Mayor: Roger Hanson

Area
  - Total: 0.186 sq mi (0.481 km^{2})
  - Land: 0.186 sq mi (0.481 km^{2})
  - Water: 0 sq mi (0.000 km^{2}) 0.00%
- Elevation: 1,535 ft (468 m)

Population (2020)
  - Total: 22
  - Estimate (2025): 19
  - Density: 120/sq mi (46/km^{2})
- Time zone: UTC–6 (Central (CST))
  - Summer (DST): UTC–5 (CDT)
- ZIP Code: 58711
- Area code: 701
- FIPS code: 38-02660
- GNIS feature ID: 1035912
- Website: antlernd.com

Antler is a city in Bottineau County, North Dakota, United States. The population was 22 as of the 2020 census, and was estimated at 19 in 2025.

== History ==
Antler was established as a rural post office base in 1898. The developed town moved to its present location in 1902 to be closer to the Great Northern Railway to the south. The town was formally platted and founded in 1905, and reached a population of 342 by the 1910 census. In 1911 Antler was the site of a system of tornadoes that killed ten people, making it the third deadliest tornado in North Dakota's recorded history.

Antler's population declined to 101 by the 1980 Census, and just 47 as of the 2000 census.

Antler High School closed in 1976. The Antler Grade School was set to close in 1981. Fearing the end of their town, Rick Jorgensen and Harley "Bud" Kissner thought of ways to bring in newcomers with school-age children to the town with the intent of keeping the school open. Rick thought of the idea to give away land and Bud volunteered some of his 640-acre (2.6 km^{2}) farm to modern homesteaders. The deal was to stay for five years and enroll the children in the Antler elementary school. Rick drew up a newspaper ad while a wire service spread the story. The story made national network news, airing twice on NBC evening edition, with the first story stating the reason was to increase the population and the second story about its role in reopening of the town's schools by the land giveaway. Rick received letters from all over the world, including Germany and Australia. The plan worked for just a few years and the grade school closed in 1987, with 6 families receiving plots of 5 or 9 acres (36,000 m^{2}).

== Geography ==
According to the United States Census Bureau, the city has a total area of 0.186 square miles (0.48 km^{2}), all land.

Antler is located in Antler Township along the 49th parallel, the international border with Canada. Both Antler and the surrounding township are named for nearby Antler Creek, whose branches resemble deer antlers when viewed on a map. Nearby to the northwest is the tripoint of North Dakota with the Canadian provinces of Saskatchewan and Manitoba.

== Demographics ==
Historical population
Census	Pop.	Note	%±
1910	342		—
1920	265		−22.5%
1930	318		20.0%
1940	254		−20.1%
1950	217		−14.6%
1960	210		−3.2%
1970	135		−35.7%
1980	101		−25.2%
1990	74		−26.7%
2000	47		−36.5%
2010	27		−42.6%
2020	22		−18.5%
2025 (est.)	19		−13.6%
U.S. Decennial Census; 2020 Census

=== 2020 census ===
As of the 2020 census, there were 22 people, 16 households, and 9 families residing in the city.

=== 2010 census ===
As of the 2010 census, there were 27 people, 16 households, and 6 families residing in the city. The population density was 158.8 inhabitants per square mile (61.3/km^{2}). There were 29 housing units at an average density of 170.6 per square mile (65.9/km^{2}). The racial makeup of the city was 96.3% White and 3.7% Native American. Hispanic or Latino people of any race were 3.7% of the population.

There were 16 households, of which 12.5% had children under the age of 18 living with them, 31.3% were married couples living together, 6.3% had a male householder with no wife present, and 62.5% were non-families. 62.5% of all households were made up of individuals, and 43.8% had someone living alone who was 65 years of age or older. The average household size was 1.69 and the average family size was 2.83.

The median age in the city was 53.5 years. 14.8% of residents were under the age of 18; 3.7% were between the ages of 18 and 24; 11.1% were from 25 to 44; 37% were from 45 to 64; and 33.3% were 65 years of age or older. The gender makeup of the city was 51.9% male and 48.1% female.

=== 2000 census ===
As of the 2000 census, there were 47 people, 24 households, and 13 families residing in the city. The population density was 264.45 inhabitants per square mile (102.1/km^{2}). There were 44 housing units at an average density of 247.57 per square mile (95.6/km^{2}). The racial makeup of the city was 100.00% white.

Residents identified themselves as having predominately European ancestry, with the largest three being Norwegian (25.5%), Swedish (14.5%), and German (10.9%).

There were 24 households, out of which 16.7% had children under the age of 18 living with them, 50.0% were married couples living together, and 45.8% were non-families. 41.7% of all households were made up of individuals, and 25.0% had someone living alone who was 65 years of age or older. The average household size was 1.96 and the average family size was 2.69.

In the city, the population was spread out, with 21.3% under the age of 18, 2.1% from 18 to 24, 27.7% from 25 to 44, 23.4% from 45 to 64, and 25.5% who were 65 years of age or older. The median age was 45 years. For every 100 females, there were 88.0 males. For every 100 females age 18 and over, there were 85.0 males.

The median income for a household in the city was $16,250, and the median income for a family was $58,000. Males had a median income of $38,750 versus $25,000 for females. The per capita income for the city was $12,516. There were no families and 10.9% of the population living below the poverty line, including no under eighteens and 20.0% of those over 64.

== Attractions ==
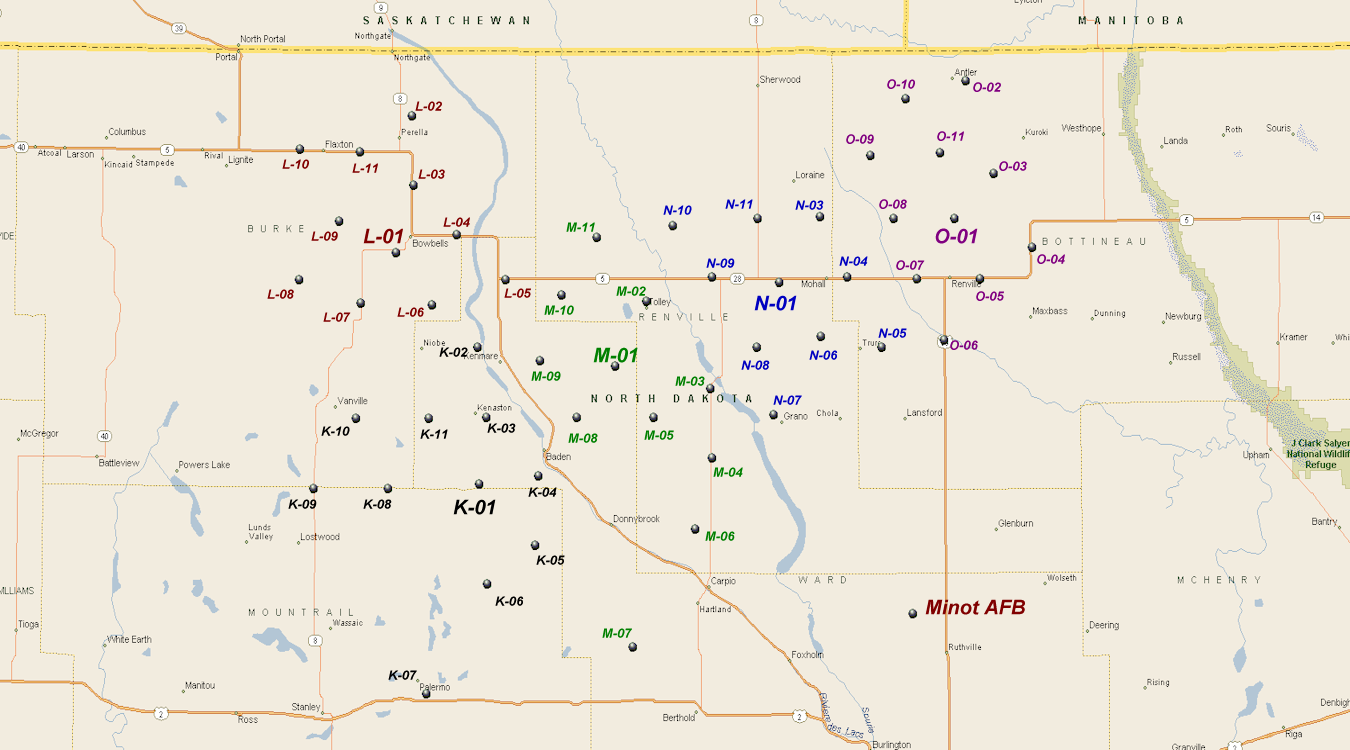
742d Missile Squadron - ALL

Antler is the home of what was previously the world's largest historical quilt. The quilt, coordinated by Leona Tennyson, measured 85 by 134 feet and featured the outline of the state of North Dakota, partitioned into its counties.

Antler is home to the O-2 Flight, "King Stag", LGM-30 Minuteman Nuclear Missile silo (48-58-01 North, 101-15-36 West), with the distinction of being the closest intercontinental nuclear missile to a Nuclear-missile-free Canada. The site is staffed by Missile Operations Flights, Operation Support Flight, and Security Forces Flight crews from the 742d Missile Squadron of the 91st Missile Wing "Rough Riders", based out of Minot AFB, Minot, North Dakota.
