= Landa, North Dakota =

Landa
- City
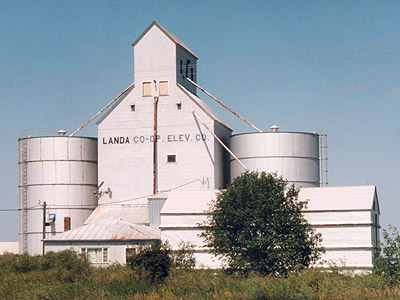
- Grain elevator in Landa

- Location of Landa, North Dakota
- Coordinates: 48°53′45″N 100°54′43″W
- Country: United States
- State: North Dakota
- County: Bottineau
- Founded: 1904

Area
  - Total: 0.077 sq mi (0.20 km^{2})
  - Land: 0.077 sq mi (0.20 km^{2})
  - Water: 0 sq mi (0.00 km^{2})
- Elevation: 1,483 ft (452 m)

Population (2020)
  - Total: 41
  - Estimate (2022): 38
  - Density: 536.5/sq mi (207.13/km^{2})
- Time zone: UTC–6 (Central (CST))
  - Summer (DST): UTC–5 (CDT)
- ZIP Code: 58783
- Area code: 701
- FIPS code: 38-44700
- GNIS feature ID: 1036116

Landa is a city in Bottineau County, North Dakota, United States. The population was 41 at the 2020 census. Landa was founded in 1904.

== History ==
The extension westward of the railroad in 1903 led to the establishment of Landa along the Great Northern Railway. Originally named Strabane, Norwegian immigrants renamed it after Daniel D. Landa and Theodore T. Landa, early settlers in the area.

Landa once had a bank, a hardware store, a lumber yard, a hotel, and other business establishments. Landa incorporated as a city in 1922, and showed a population of 140 during the 1930 Census.

== Geography ==
Landa is located in Scotia Township in the northern part of the county. According to the United States Census Bureau, the city has a total area of 0.08 square miles (0.21 km^{2}), all land.

== Demographics ==
Historical population
Census	Pop.	Note	%±
1930	140		—
1940	149		6.4%
1950	132		−11.4%
1960	110		−16.7%
1970	61		−44.5%
1980	62		1.6%
1990	38		−38.7%
2000	28		−26.3%
2010	38		35.7%
2020	41		7.9%
2022 (est.)	38		−7.3%
U.S. Decennial Census; 2020 Census

=== 2010 census ===
As of the census of 2010, there were 38 people, 17 households, and 10 families living in the city. The population density was 475.0 inhabitants per square mile (183.4/km^{2}). There were 22 housing units at an average density of 275.0 per square mile (106.2/km^{2}). The racial makeup of the city was 100.0% White.

There were 17 households, of which 17.6% had children under the age of 18 living with them, 58.8% were married couples living together, and 41.2% were non-families. 35.3% of all households were made up of individuals, and 11.8% had someone living alone who was 65 years of age or older. The average household size was 2.24 and the average family size was 2.90.

The median age in the city was 50 years. 23.7% of residents were under 18; 2.6% were between 18 and 24; 15.8% were from 25 to 44; 36.9% were from 45 to 64, and 21.1% were 65 years of age or older. The gender makeup of the city was 57.9% male and 42.1% female.

=== 2000 census ===
As of the census of 2000, there were 28 people, 15 households, and 7 families living in the city. The population density was 386.1 inhabitants per square mile (149.1/km^{2}). There were 28 housing units at an average density of 386.1 per square mile (149.1/km^{2}). The racial makeup of the city was 100.00% White.

There were 15 households, out of which 13.3% had children under the age of 18 living with them, 40.0% were married couples living together, and 53.3% were non-families. 33.3% of all households were made up of individuals, and none had someone living alone who was 65 years of age or older. The average household size was 1.87 and the average family size was 2.43.

In the city, the population was spread out, with 7.1% under the age of 18, 17.9% from 18 to 24, 25.0% from 25 to 44, 46.4% from 45 to 64, and 3.6% who were 65 years of age or older. The median age was 45 years. For every 100 females, there were 133.3 males. For every 100 females age 18 and over, there were 160.0 males.

The median income for a household in the city was $26,500, and the median income for a family was $26,000. Males had a median income of $25,625 versus $8,750 for females. The per capita income for the city was $15,109. None of the population and none of the families were below the poverty line.
