= Kane Township =

Kane Township may refer to:

- Kane Township, Greene County, Illinois
- Kane Township, Benton County, Iowa
- Kane Township, Pottawattamie County, Iowa, in Pottawattamie County, Iowa
- Kane Township, Bottineau County, North Dakota
