= Cecil Township =

Cecil Township may refer to:

- Cecil Township, Haywood County, North Carolina, in Haywood County, North Carolina
- Cecil Township, Bottineau County, North Dakota
- Cecil Township, Washington County, Pennsylvania
