= Oak Creek Township =

Oak Creek Township may refer to:

- Oak Creek Township, Butler County, Nebraska
- Oak Creek Township, Saunders County, Nebraska
- Oak Creek Township, Bottineau County, North Dakota
