= Omemee =

Omemee means pigeon in some Native American languages and may refer to:

- Omemee, Ontario
- Omemee, North Dakota
