= Bottineau Public Schools =

School district headquartered in Bottineau, North Dakota, US

Bottineau Public School District No. 1 a.k.a. Bottineau Public Schools, is a school district headquartered in Bottineau, North Dakota.

Mostly in Bottineau County, it serves Bottineau, Gardena, and Overly. It also has a section in Rolette County.

== History ==
In 1896 there were tenders to have two school buildings constructed in Bottineau.

In 1898 there was 39% turnout in the school bond election to build a school. The vote succeeded in 37–2, and the bond was for $10,000. The petition to hold the election had 168 signatures.

In 1988 the North Dakota High School Activities Association classified Bottineau High School as Class A. That year the school was seeking to be placed in Class B and formally petitioned to do so.
