= Russell, North Dakota =

- Unincorporated community
- Location of Russell, North Dakota
- Coordinates: 48°40′25″N 100°54′09″W
- Country: United States
- State: North Dakota
- County: Bottineau County
- Township: Tacoma
- Founded: 1905
- Incorporated: 1905
- Disincorporated: 1996
- Elevation: 1,463 ft (446 m)
- Time zone: UTC-6 (Central (CST))
  - Summer (DST): UTC-5 (CDT)
- ZIP Code: 58762
- Area code: 701
- FIPS code: 38-69180
- GNIS feature ID: 1036248

Russell is an unincorporated community in Bottineau County in the U.S. state of North Dakota.

== History ==
Russell was established as a farm post office on August 21, 1901, with the postmaster being Austin C. Russell. The post office was relocated in 1905 one mile to the northeast to the townsite on the Soo Line Railroad. Russell incorporated in 1905, and the town reached the peak population of 161 in 1910. Russell would later decline to a population of 14 in 1970. Russell disincorporated on November 14, 1996.

Historical population
Census	Pop.	Note	%±
1910	161		—
1920	119		−26.1%
1930	94		−21.0%
1940	70		−25.5%
1950	51		−27.1%
1960	25		−51.0%
1970	14		−44.0%
1980	18		28.6%
1990	14		−22.2%
U.S. Decennial Census
