= Chatfield Township =

Chatfield Township may refer to the following townships in the United States:

- Chatfield Township, Fillmore County, Minnesota
- Chatfield Township, Bottineau County, North Dakota
- Chatfield Township, Ohio
