= Henry Caulfield =

Henry Caulfield may refer to:

- Henry S. Caulfield (1873–1966), American lawyer and politician
- Henry P. Caulfield Jr. (1915–2002), American political scientist
