= Phillip O. Foss =

American political scientist

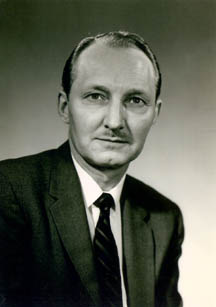
- Born: Phillip Oliver Foss; May 18, 1916; Maxbass, North Dakota, US
- Died: October 14, 2001 (aged 85); Fort Collins, Colorado, US
- Other names: Groovey, POF
- Occupation: Professor
- Known for: The Politics of Grass

Phillip Oliver Foss (May 18, 1916 – October 14, 2001) was an American political scientist. A decorated veteran of World War II and the Korean War, he was employed in public service with the United States Department of the Interior, helped establish the doctoral program in Environmental Politics and Policy at Colorado State University; served as a consultant to government agencies, and received numerous awards and honors for his work and writings, including listings in both Who’s Who in America and Who’s Who in the World.

== Early life and education ==
Born in Maxbass, North Dakota, to Oliver Foss and Petra Elton Foss, Phillip Foss graduated from Medicine Lake High School in Montana in 1933, received a teaching certificate from the University of Montana in 1936, and at age 19 began teaching grade school. He married Dorothy Marie Hansen in 1941 and they raised four children, celebrating their 60th wedding anniversary in 2001. In 1947 he received a bachelor's degree in economics from the University of Washington, completing his master's degree in 1953 and Ph.D. in political science at the University of Oregon in 1956.

Foss joined the United States Army Air Corps in 1942 and served in the Pacific Theater during the Second World War (1942–46), and in the U.S. Air Force during the Korean War (1951–53), retiring as lieutenant colonel. He received several awards and commendations, including the U.S. Service Medal, the National Defense Service Medal, the Korean Service Medal and a Commendation Medal. On the 50th anniversary of the Korean War, Foss received the Korean War Service Medal.

== Academic career ==
Foss began his academic career as an instructor at the University of Oregon in (1955–57); was Assistant Professor (1957–61) and Associate Professor (1961–62) at San Francisco State College; Associate Professor (1962–64) and Professor (1964–1972) at Colorado State University. He chaired the Department of Political Science at Colorado State University (1965–72) and its Natural Resources Center (1964–67), and was the driving force behind establishment of its doctoral program in Environmental Politics and Policy with Henry P. Caulfield, Jr. and Norman I. Wengert.

Phillip Foss is perhaps best known for his early cases studies of the role of local grazing advisory committees established by the Taylor Grazing Act of 1934 in regulating the grazing of livestock on federal public lands. Foss found that such committees were often dominated by the same ranchers and cattlemen whose activities were supposed to be regulated. Foss often said it was probably the most frequently checked out (and most rapidly returned) university library book in the 1960s.

== Honors and recognition ==
Foss was recipient of an Outstanding Dissertation Award (1957) from the American Society for Public Administration; and Outstanding Service Award from San Francisco State College (1960), a Distinguished Service Award from Colorado State University (1970), was elected to the Executive Council of the Western Political Science Association (1967–69), served as its Vice President (1970–71) and President (1972–73), and was listed in both Who’s Who in America 1988-89 and Who’s Who in the World 1990-91.

== Consultancies ==
Foss served as consultant on natural resources issues for the Bureau of Land Management, U.S. Department of the Interior (1964–65, 1969) during preparation of the National Recreation Survey of the Outdoor Recreation Resources Review Commission, and to the National Academy of Sciences (1969–70).

== Selected scholarly publications ==
- The Grazing Fee Dilemma. University, AL: University of Alabama Press, 1960.
- Politics and Grass. Seattle: University of Washington Press, 1960.
- The Battle of Soldier Creek. University, AL: University of Alabama Press, 1961.
- Reorganization and Reassignment in the California Highway Patrol. University AL: University of Alabama, Press, 1962.
- Federal Agencies and Outdoor Recreation. Fort Collins: Environmental Resources Center, Colorado State University, 1962.
- Education and Natural Resources. Fort Collins: Environmental Resources Center, Colorado State University, 1964.
- An Exploration of Components Affecting and Limiting Policymaking Options in Local Water Agencies, with Duane W. Hill and Charles L Garrison. Fort Collins: Natural Resources Center, Colorado State University, 1968.
- Organizational Adaption to Changes in Public Objectives for Management of Cache La Poudre River System, with Duane Hill and Roy L. Meek. Fort Collins: Environmental Resources Center, Colorado State University, 1969.
- Organization of Water Management for Agricultural Production in West Pakistan, with Duane Hill. Fort Collins: Environmental Resources Center, Colorado State University, 1970.
- Politics and Policies: The Continuing Issues, with Duane Hill. Belmont, CA: Wadsworth, 1970.
- Public Land Policy. Boulder: Colorado Associated University Press, 1970.
- Outdoor Recreation. New York: Chelsea House Publishers, 1971.
- Politics and Ecology. Belmont, CA: Duxbury Press, 1972.
- "Policy Analysis and the Political Science Profession." Policy Studies Journal, 2(Autumn): 67–71, 1973.
- Outdoor Recreation and Environmental Quality. Fort Collins: Environmental Resources Center, Colorado State University, 1973.
- Environment and Colorado: A Handbook. Fort Collins: Environmental Resources Center, Colorado State University, 1973.
- Institutional Arrangements for Effective Water Management in Colorado. Fort Collins: Environmental Resources Center, Colorado State University, 1978.
- Federal Lands Policy. New York: Greenwood Press, 1987.
