= Bottineau County, North Dakota =

County in North Dakota, United States

- County
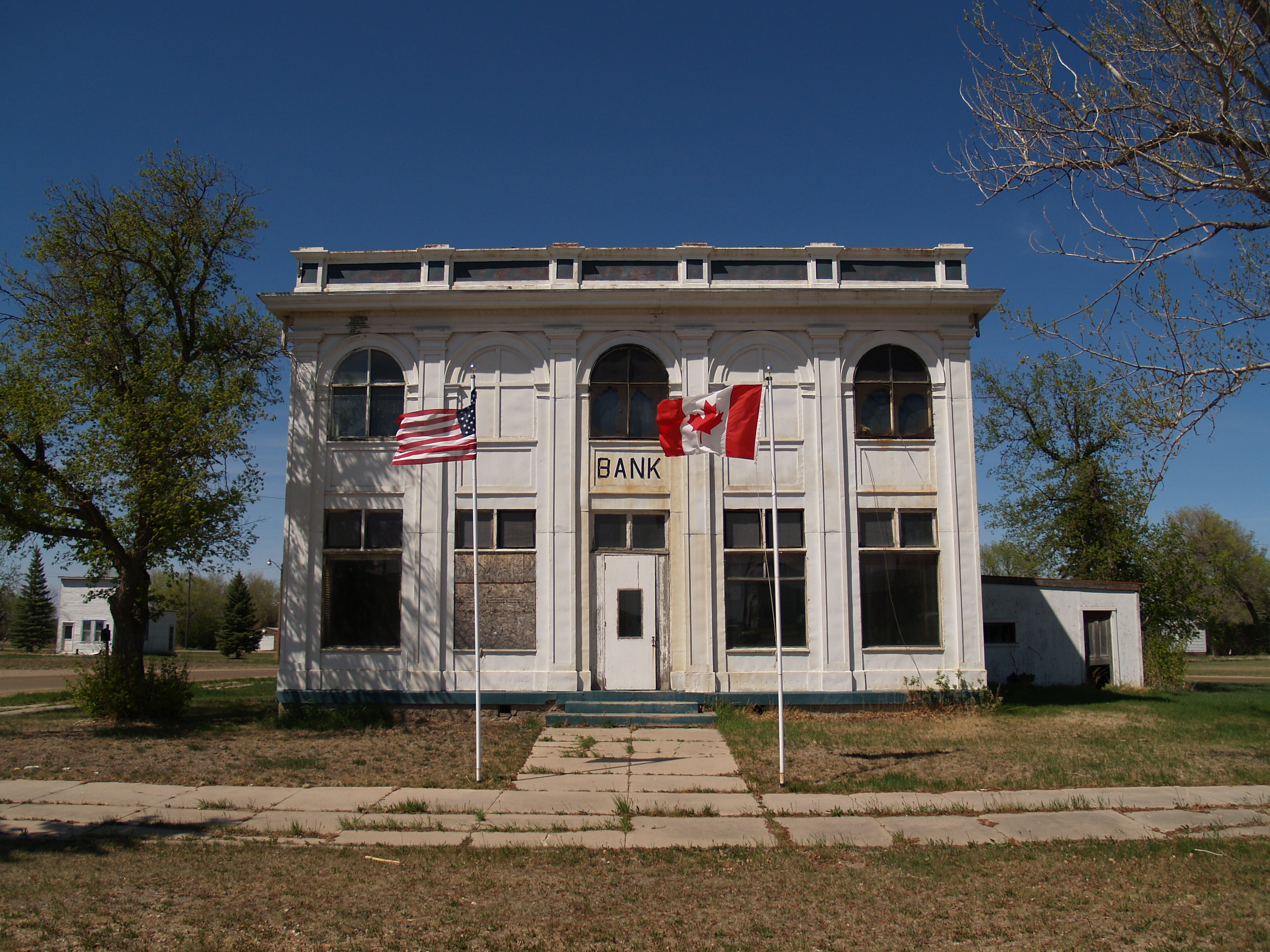
- Former U.S. Customs house in Antler

- Location within the U.S. state of North Dakota
- Coordinates: 48.794412°N 100.831257°W
- Country: United States
- State: North Dakota
- Founded: January 4, 1873 (created); July 17, 1884 (organized)
- Named for: Pierre Bottineau
- Seat: Bottineau
- Largest city: Bottineau

Area
  - Total: 1,697.696 sq mi (4,397.01 km^{2})
  - Land: 1,668.858 sq mi (4,322.32 km^{2})
  - Water: 28.838 sq mi (74.69 km^{2}) 1.70%

Population (2020)
  - Total: 6,379
  - Estimate (2025): 6,284 ▼
  - Density: 3.831/sq mi (1.479/km^{2})
- Time zone: UTC−6 (Central)
  - Summer (DST): UTC−5 (CDT)
- Area code: 701
- Congressional district: At-large
- Website: bottineauco.com

Bottineau County is a county in the U.S. state of North Dakota. As of the 2020 census, the population was 6,379. and was estimated to be 6,284 in 2025. The county seat and the largest city is Bottineau. Bottineau County has several lakes, predominantly in the north and east of the county. Bottineau County is home to Lake Metigoshe & Lake Metigoshe State Park, which is located in the north section of the county.

The Territorial legislature identified Bottineau as being one of the original counties of the territory on January 4, 1873. It was created on July 17, 1884. It is named for Pierre Bottineau (c.1814-1895), a Métis pioneer, hunter, and trapper who became a successful land speculator.

Bottineau is well known for its winter park, snowmobiling, and ice fishing. Manitoba and Saskatchewan are on its northern border.

== Geography ==
Soils of Bottineau County

Bottineau County lies on the north side of North Dakota. Its north boundary line abuts the south boundary line of Canada. The Deep River flows south-southeastward through the center part of the county. The county terrain consists of rolling hills, dotted with lakes and ponds. The terrain slopes to the south, with its highest point on its upper east boundary line, at 2,283 ft (696 m) ASL.

According to the United States Census Bureau, the county has a total area of 1,697.696 square miles (4,397.01 km^{2}), of which 1,668.858 square miles (4,322.32 km^{2}) is land and 28.838 square miles (74.69 km^{2}) (1.70%) is water. It is the 11th largest county in North Dakota by total area. Part of the Turtle Mountain plateau lies in the northeastern corner of the county.

=== Adjacent counties and rural municipalities ===
- Argyle No. 1, Saskatchewan - north
- Municipality of Two Borders, Manitoba - north
- Municipality of Brenda-Waskada, Manitoba - north
- Municipality of Deloraine-Winchester, Manitoba - north
- Municipality of Boissevain-Morton, Manitoba - north
- Rolette County - east
- Pierce County - southeast
- McHenry County - south
- Renville County - west

=== Major highways ===
- U.S. Highway 83
- North Dakota Highway 5
- North Dakota Highway 14
- North Dakota Highway 43
- North Dakota Highway 60
- North Dakota Highway 256

=== Protected areas ===
- J. Clark Salyer National Wildlife Refuge (part)
- Lake Metigoshe State Park
- Lords Lake National Wildlife Refuge (part)
- North Dakota State Forest Service Land

=== Lakes ===
- Black Lake
- Boundary Lake
- Grass Lake
- Island Lake
- Long Lake
- Loon Lake
- Lords Lake
- Lake Metigoshe
- Pelican Lake
- Strawberry Lake

== Demographics ==
Historical population
Census	Pop.	Note	%±
1890	2,893		—
1900	7,532		160.4%
1910	17,295		129.6%
1920	15,109		−12.6%
1930	14,853		−1.7%
1940	13,253		−10.8%
1950	12,140		−8.4%
1960	11,315		−6.8%
1970	9,496		−16.1%
1980	9,239		−2.7%
1990	8,011		−13.3%
2000	7,149		−10.8%
2010	6,429		−10.1%
2020	6,379		−0.8%
2025 (est.)	6,284	▼	−1.5%
U.S. Decennial Census; 1790–1960 1900–1990; 1990–2000 2010–2020

As of the fourth quarter of 2024, the median home value in Bottineau County was $202,269. As of the 2023 American Community Survey, there are 2,695 estimated households in Bottineau County with an average of 2.27 persons per household. The county has a median household income of $83,460. Approximately 10.8% of the county's population lives at or below the poverty line. Bottineau County has an estimated 58.5% employment rate, with 27.4% of the population holding a bachelor's degree or higher and 94.0% holding a high school diploma.

The top five reported ancestries (people were allowed to report up to two ancestries, thus the figures will generally add to more than 100%) were English (96.6%), Spanish (1.7.%), Indo-European (1.1%), Asian and Pacific Islander (0.5%), and Other (0.0%). The median age in the county was 43.8 years.

Bottineau County, North Dakota – racial and ethnic composition
Note: the US Census treats Hispanic/Latino as an ethnic category. This table excludes Latinos from the racial categories and assigns them to a separate category. Hispanics/Latinos may be of any race.

Race / ethnicity (NH = non-Hispanic)	Pop. 1980	Pop. 1990	Pop. 2000	Pop. 2010	Pop. 2020
White alone (NH)	9,122 (98.73%)	7,916 (98.81%)	6,935 (97.01%)	6,062 (94.29%)	5,688 (89.17%)
Black or African American alone (NH)	1 (0.01%)	6 (0.07%)	15 (0.21%)	25 (0.39%)	31 (0.49%)
Native American or Alaska Native alone (NH)	76 (0.82%)	58 (0.72%)	96 (1.34%)	130 (2.02%)	197 (3.09%)
Asian alone (NH)	17 (0.18%)	15 (0.19%)	13 (0.18%)	16 (0.25%)	42 (0.66%)
Pacific Islander alone (NH)	—	—	1 (0.01%)	1 (0.02%)	1 (0.02%)
Other race alone (NH)	6 (0.06%)	0 (0.00%)	1 (0.01%)	2 (0.03%)	13 (0.20%)
Mixed race or multiracial (NH)	—	—	53 (0.74%)	111 (1.73%)	266 (4.17%)
Hispanic or Latino (any race)	17 (0.18%)	16 (0.20%)	35 (0.49%)	82 (1.28%)	141 (2.21%)
Total	9,239 (100.00%)	8,011 (100.00%)	7,149 (100.00%)	6,429 (100.00%)	6,379 (100.00%)

=== 2024 estimate ===
As of the 2024 estimate, there were 6,391 people and 2,695 households residing in the county. There were 3,979 housing units at an average density of 2.38 per square mile (0.9/km^{2}). The racial makeup of the county was 91.8% White (89.6% NH White), 0.7% African American, 4.0% Native American, 0.8% Asian, 0.0% Pacific Islander, _% from some other races and 2.7% from two or more races. Hispanic or Latino people of any race were 2.7% of the population.

=== 2020 census ===
As of the 2020 census, there were 6,379 people, 2,779 households, and 1,730 families residing in the county. The population density was 3.8 inhabitants per square mile (1.5/km^{2}). There were 3,931 housing units at an average density of 2.36 per square mile (0.9/km^{2}), of which 29.3% were vacant, 79.1% of occupied units were owner-occupied, and 20.9% were renter-occupied; the homeowner vacancy rate was 4.2% and the rental vacancy rate was 14.4%.

Of the residents, 21.9% were under the age of 18 and 24.7% were 65 years of age or older; the median age was 45.3 years. For every 100 females there were 105.0 males, and for every 100 females age 18 and over there were 104.7 males.

The racial makeup of the county was 90.2% White, 0.5% Black or African American, 3.4% American Indian and Alaska Native, 0.7% Asian, 0.6% from some other race, and 4.6% from two or more races. Hispanic or Latino residents of any race comprised 2.2% of the population.

There were 2,779 households in the county, of which 25.0% had children under the age of 18 living with them and 20.8% had a female householder with no spouse or partner present. About 33.1% of all households were made up of individuals and 16.9% had someone living alone who was 65 years of age or older.

=== 2010 census ===
As of the 2010 census, there were 6,429 people, 2,832 households, and 1,823 families residing in the county. The population density was 3.9 inhabitants per square mile (1.5/km^{2}). There were 4,341 housing units at an average density of 2.60 per square mile (1.0/km^{2}). The racial makeup of the county was 95.07% White, 0.39% African American, 2.12% Native American, 0.25% Asian, 0.02% Pacific Islander, 0.34% from some other races and 1.82% from two or more races. Hispanic or Latino people of any race were 1.28% of the population. In terms of ancestry, 47.0% were Norwegian, 37.4% were German, 7.7% were Irish, 6.2% were Swedish, and 1.4% were American.

There were 2,832 households, 22.8% had children under the age of 18 living with them, 55.3% were married couples living together, 5.6% had a female householder with no husband present, 35.6% were non-families, and 32.2% of all households were made up of individuals. The average household size was 2.17 and the average family size was 2.72. The median age was 48.0 years.

The median income for a household in the county was $40,227 and the median income for a family was $60,714. Males had a median income of $42,227 versus $27,500 for females. The per capita income for the county was $26,277. About 9.5% of families and 13.6% of the population were below the poverty line, including 16.5% of those under age 18 and 13.4% of those age 65 or over.

== Communities ==
=== Cities ===
- Antler
- Bottineau (county seat)
- Gardena
- Kramer
- Landa
- Lansford
- Maxbass
- Newburg
- Overly
- Souris
- Westhope
- Willow City

=== Unincorporated communities ===
- Belmar
- Carbury
- Dunning
- Eckman
- Forfar
- Hurd
- Kuroki
- Omemee
- Renville
- Roth
- Russell
- Truro
- White Spur

=== Townships ===
- Amity
- Antler
- Bentinck
- Blaine
- Brander
- Cecil
- Chatfield
- Cordelia
- Cut Bank
- Dalen
- Eidsvold
- Elms
- Elysian
- Haram
- Hastings
- Hoffman
- Homen
- Kane
- Lansford
- Lewis
- Lordsburg
- Mount Rose
- Newborg
- Oak Creek
- Oak Valley
- Ostby
- Peabody
- Pickering
- Renville
- Richburg
- Roland
- Scandia
- Scotia
- Sergius
- Sherman
- Starbuck
- Stone Creek
- Tacoma
- Wayne
- Wellington
- Wheaton
- Whitby
- Whitteron
- Willow Vale

== Politics ==
Bottineau County voters have been reliably Republican for decades. In no national election since 1964 has the county selected the Democratic Party candidate.

United States presidential election results for Bottineau County, North Dakota
Year	Republican		Democratic		Third party(ies)	
Year	No.	%	No.	%	No.	%
1900	728	52.30%	628	45.11%	36	2.59%
1904	2,094	68.48%	753	24.62%	211	6.90%
1908	1,951	59.45%	1,146	34.92%	185	5.64%
1912	700	26.94%	825	31.76%	1,073	41.30%
1916	1,294	41.34%	1,471	47.00%	365	11.66%
1920	3,487	72.52%	970	20.17%	351	7.30%
1924	1,338	31.99%	221	5.28%	2,623	62.72%
1928	2,680	49.79%	2,648	49.19%	55	1.02%
1932	1,201	21.57%	4,178	75.05%	188	3.38%
1936	1,224	21.18%	3,286	56.86%	1,269	21.96%
1940	3,129	55.60%	2,469	43.87%	30	0.53%
1944	2,663	57.15%	1,953	41.91%	44	0.94%
1948	2,513	59.39%	1,571	37.13%	147	3.47%
1952	3,911	77.69%	1,094	21.73%	29	0.58%
1956	2,923	62.91%	1,718	36.98%	5	0.11%
1960	3,092	61.00%	1,974	38.94%	3	0.06%
1964	2,060	44.71%	2,546	55.26%	1	0.02%
1968	2,633	60.06%	1,520	34.67%	231	5.27%
1972	3,263	69.60%	1,369	29.20%	56	1.19%
1976	2,638	56.13%	1,987	42.28%	75	1.60%
1980	3,394	70.30%	1,090	22.58%	344	7.13%
1984	3,356	71.59%	1,279	27.28%	53	1.13%
1988	2,530	59.52%	1,684	39.61%	37	0.87%
1992	1,787	43.54%	1,266	30.85%	1,051	25.61%
1996	1,682	47.80%	1,280	36.37%	557	15.83%
2000	2,349	63.66%	1,173	31.79%	168	4.55%
2004	2,468	67.17%	1,168	31.79%	38	1.03%
2008	2,059	58.56%	1,387	39.45%	70	1.99%
2012	2,280	64.14%	1,183	33.28%	92	2.59%
2016	2,494	71.38%	736	21.06%	264	7.56%
2020	2,575	74.19%	821	23.65%	75	2.16%
2024	2,628	76.24%	735	21.32%	84	2.44%

== See also ==
- National Register of Historic Places listings in Bottineau County, North Dakota
