= Haram Township, Bottineau County, North Dakota =

Haram Township
- Township
- Location of Haram Township
- Coordinates: 48°56′22″N 100°39′00″W
- Country: United States
- State: North Dakota
- County: Bottineau
- Organized: 1910

Area
  - Total: 43.59 sq mi (112.9 km^{2})
  - Land: 43.53 sq mi (112.7 km^{2})
  - Water: 0.06 sq mi (0.16 km^{2})
- Elevation: 1,660 ft (506 m)

Population (2000)
  - Total: 85
  - Density: 6/sq mi (2.3/km^{2})
- Time zone: UTC-6 (Central (CST))
  - Summer (DST): UTC-5 (CDT)
- Area code: 701
- FIPS code: 38-35220
- U.S. Census GEOID: 3800935220
- GNIS feature ID: 1759277

Haram Township is a civil township in Bottineau County in the U.S. state of North Dakota. As of the 2000 census, its population was 85.

== History ==
Haram Township was organized in 1910 from Mountain View School Township in 1910. The 1910 Census recorded a population of 424 in the township.

Early Norwegian settlers in the area named the township after Haram Municipality in Norway.

=== Schools ===
- Mountain View School No. 2
- Mountain View School No. 3

== Geography ==
Haram Township is located in survey townships 163N and 164N, Range 77W. Township 164N, Range 77W is a fractional township containing less than the standard 36 sections of land, due its location along the U.S. border with Canada.

=== Natural features ===
- Boundary Creek
- Turtle Mountains

== Cities and populated places ==
- Souris
