= Matt Johnson (North Dakota politician) =

American politician

Member of the North Dakota House of Representatives from the 28th district
- In office 1908–1910

Personal details
- Born: February 1, 1872 Northwood, Iowa, U.S.
- Died: 1935 (aged 62–63) Traill County, North Dakota, U.S.
- Party: Republican

Matt Johnson (1872 – 1935) was an American newspaper publisher and politician from North Dakota who served as a member of the North Dakota House of Representatives from 1909 to 1910.

== Early life ==
Mathias Johnson was born on February 1, 1872, in Northwood, Iowa. He was a son of Knute W. Johnson and Mathia (Amundson) Johnson, both of whom were natives of Norway. He moved to Dakota Territory with this family in 1879, where they settled in Caledonia in Traill County.

== Career ==
Johnson began his career in publication with a paper at Caledonia and was later employed at Shelly and Halstad, Minnesota. He moved to Omemee, North Dakota in 1901 and purchased the Omemee Herald in 1905.

Johnson was elected as a Republican to the North Dakota House of Representatives in 1908, and served just one term. He represented the 28th legislative district together with Edward L. Garden of Souris, North Dakota.

== Personal life ==
Johnson died in 1935 and was buried at Caledonia Cemetery in Traill County, North Dakota.
