= Elms Township, Bottineau County, North Dakota =

Elms Township
- Township
- Location of Elms Township
- Coordinates: 48°35′22″N 101°14′18″W
- Country: United States
- State: North Dakota
- County: Bottineau

Population (2010)
  - Total: 57
- Time zone: UTC-6 (Central (CST))
  - Summer (DST): UTC-5 (CDT)

Elms Township is a civil township in Bottineau County in the U.S. state of North Dakota. As of the 2010 census, its population was 57.
