= Eidsvold Township, Bottineau County, North Dakota =

Eidsvold Township
- Township
- Location of Eidsvold Township
- Coordinates: 48°51′09″N 100°49′53″W
- Country: United States
- State: North Dakota
- County: Bottineau

Population (2010)
  - Total: 35
- Time zone: UTC-6 (Central (CST))
  - Summer (DST): UTC-5 (CDT)

Eidsvold Township is a civil township in Bottineau County in the U.S. state of North Dakota. As of the 2010 census, its population was 35.
