= Peabody Township, Bottineau County, North Dakota =

Peabody Township
- Township
- Location of Peabody Township
- Coordinates: 48°51′19″N 100°38′53″W
- Country: United States
- State: North Dakota
- County: Bottineau

Population (2010)
  - Total: 18
- Time zone: UTC-6 (Central (CST))
  - Summer (DST): UTC-5 (CDT)

Peabody Township is a civil township in Bottineau County in the U.S. state of North Dakota. As of the 2010 census, its population was 18.
