= Starbuck Township, Bottineau County, North Dakota =

Starbuck Township
- Township
- Location of Starbuck Township
- Coordinates: 48°44′50″N 100°45′49″W
- Country: United States
- State: North Dakota
- County: Bottineau

Population (2010)
  - Total: 32
- Time zone: UTC-6 (Central (CST))
  - Summer (DST): UTC-5 (CDT)

Starbuck Township is a civil township in Bottineau County in the U.S. state of North Dakota. At the 2010 census, its population was 32.
