= Lansford Township, Bottineau County, North Dakota =

Lansford Township
- Township
- Location of Lansford Township
- Coordinates: 48°35′32″N 101°22′55″W
- Country: United States
- State: North Dakota
- County: Bottineau

Population (2010)
  - Total: 73
- Time zone: UTC-6 (Central (CST))
  - Summer (DST): UTC-5 (CDT)

Lansford Township is a civil township in Bottineau County in the U.S. state of North Dakota. As of the 2010 census, its population was 73.
