= Overly, North Dakota =

- City
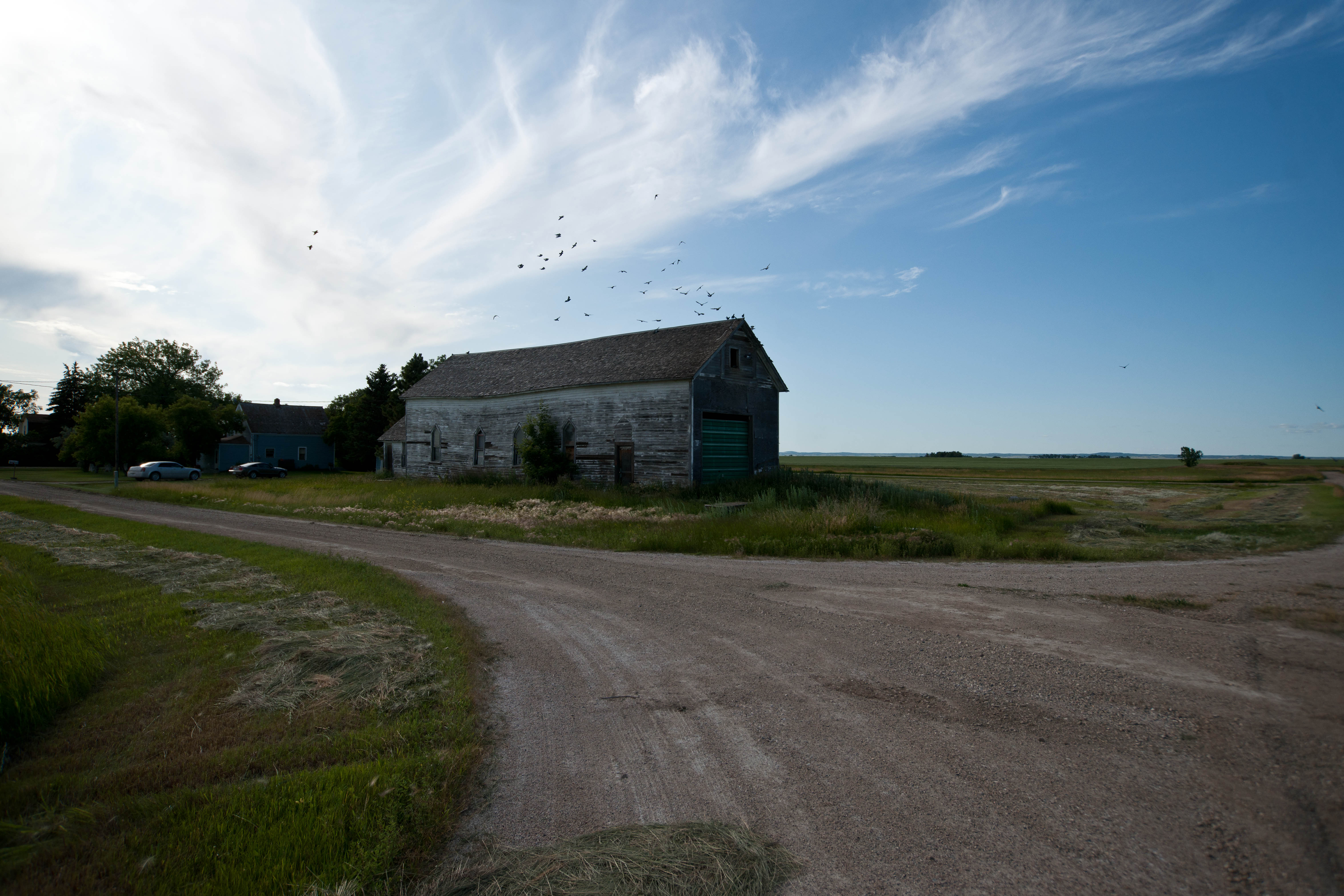
- Building in Overly

- Location of Overly, North Dakota
- Coordinates: 48°40′52″N 100°09′04″W
- Country: United States
- State: North Dakota
- County: Bottineau
- Founded: August 21, 1905

Area
  - Total: 0.371 sq mi (0.961 km^{2})
  - Land: 0.371 sq mi (0.961 km^{2})
  - Water: 0 sq mi (0.000 km^{2})
- Elevation: 1,540 ft (470 m)

Population (2020)
  - Total: 10
  - Estimate (2024): 11
  - Density: 27/sq mi (10.4/km^{2})
- Time zone: UTC–6 (Central (CST))
  - Summer (DST): UTC–5 (CDT)
- ZIP Code: 58360 (until 1996); 58384 (1996-present)
- Area code: 701
- FIPS code: 38-60380
- GNIS feature ID: 1036209

Overly is a city in Bottineau County, North Dakota, United States. The population was 10 at the 2020 census.

== History ==
Overly was founded in 1905 as a railroad loading station along the Soo Line Railroad. Overly's post office was established August 21, 1905, and service discontinued November 9, 1996. The city now shares the ZIP Code of 58384 with nearby Willow City.

For many years, the city thrived as a railroad center, serving as a crew transfer point for the railroads traveling east and west along the line. The railroad installed a roundhouse for servicing locomotives as well as coal and water facilities. A popular pastime for city residents was to gather at the rail depot on the edge of town to watch the trains in the mornings and evenings. Many speculate that the town's name was meant to describe the numerous rail crews that "laid over" in town during the shift changes. Others say the town is named for Hans Overlie, an early settler.

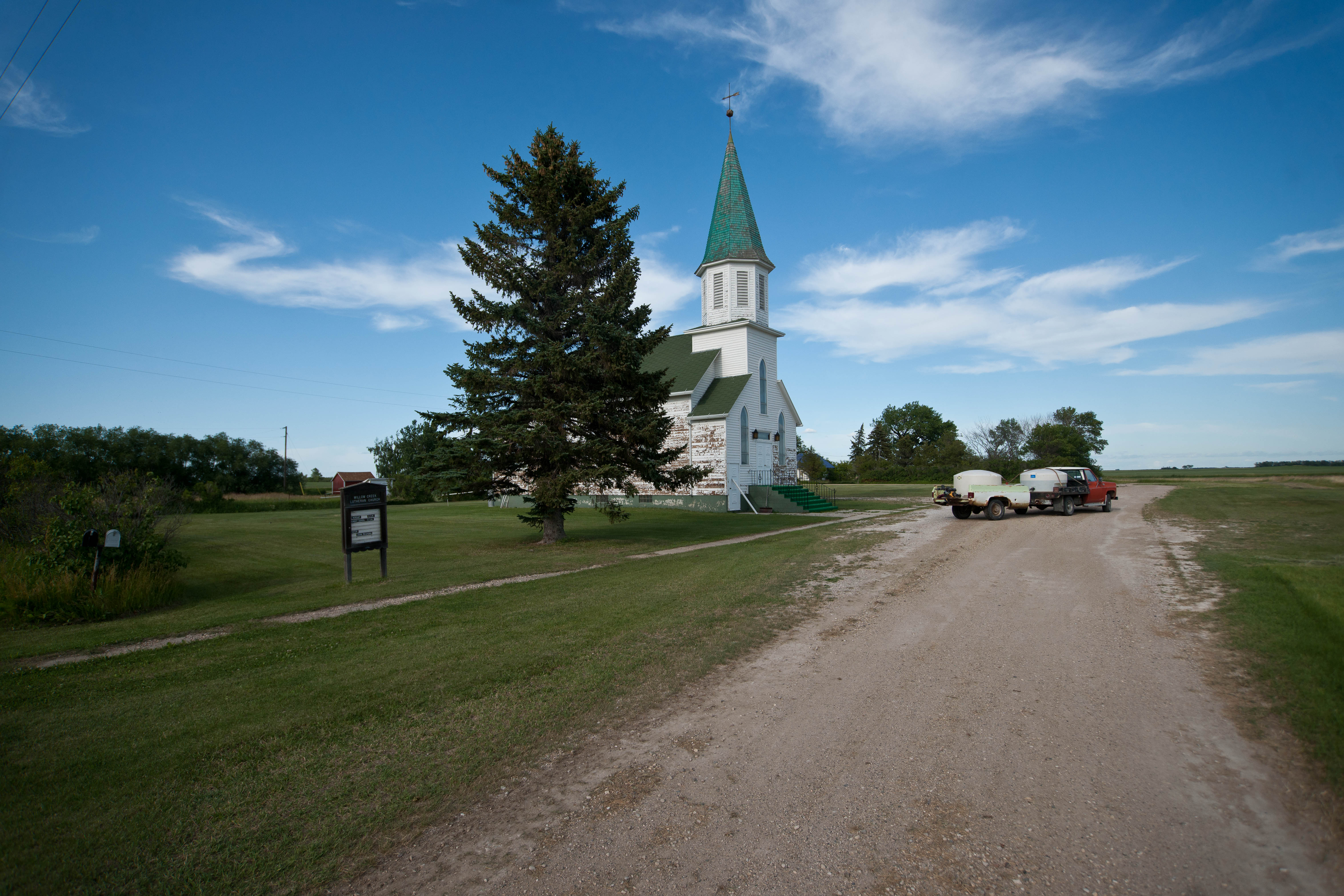
Willow Creek Lutheran Church in Overly, North Dakota; 2009

The United States Census Bureau recorded a high population of 193 in 1920. Wheat shipments and the city's status as a railroad hub seemed to indicate future growth, but the frequency of trains dwindled until the 1950s when trains just passed by without stopping. The railroad tore down the roundhouse and other facilities, commercial businesses closed down, and the city began a steady population decline to just 32 by the 1980 census. The Census Bureau currently places the 2022 population of the city at 11 people.

== Geography ==
Overly is located in Cecil Township in the eastern part of Bottineau County. The city lies along the border with neighboring Rolette County, and a 5-block portion of the city was actually platted in that county. However, the 2000 Census did not record any population for Overly in that county, and the North Dakota League of Cities does not count Overly as a multi-county municipality.

According to the United States Census Bureau, the city has a total area of 0.361 square miles (0.93 km^{2}), all land.

== Demographics ==
Historical population
Census	Pop.	Note	%±
1910	182		—
1920	193		6.0%
1930	154		−20.2%
1940	125		−18.8%
1950	90		−28.0%
1960	65		−27.8%
1970	28		−56.9%
1980	25		−10.7%
1990	25		0.0%
2000	19		−24.0%
2010	18		−5.3%
2020	10		−44.4%
2024 (est.)	11		10.0%
U.S. Decennial Census; 2020 Census

=== 2010 census ===
As of the 2010 census, there were 18 people, 8 households, and 6 families living in the city. The population density was 50.0 inhabitants per square mile (19.3/km^{2}). There were 11 housing units at an average density of 30.6 per square mile (11.8/km^{2}). The racial makeup of the city was 83.3% White and 16.7% Native American.

There were 8 households, of which 12.5% had children under the age of 18 living with them, 50.0% were married couples living together, 25.0% had a male householder with no wife present, and 25.0% were non-families. 25.0% of all households were made up of individuals. The average household size was 2.25 and the average family size was 2.17.

The median age in the city was 55 years. 22.2% of residents were under the age of 18; 0.1% were between the ages of 18 and 24; 16.7% were from 25 to 44; 33.5% were from 45 to 64; and 27.8% were 65 years of age or older. The gender makeup of the city was 61.1% male and 38.9% female.

=== 2000 census ===
As of the 2000 census, there were 19 people, 9 households, and 5 families living in the city. The population density was 53.1 inhabitants per square mile (20.5/km^{2}). There were 10 housing units at an average density of 28.0 per square mile (10.8/km^{2}). The racial makeup of the city was 100.00% white.

There were 9 households, out of which 2 had children under the age of 18 living with them, 5 were married couples living together, and 4 were non-families. 4 households were made up of individuals, and 3 had someone living alone who was 65 years of age or older. The average household size was 2.11 and the average family size was 3.00.

In the city, the population was spread out, with 21.1% under the age of 18, 5.3% from 18 to 24, 26.3% from 25 to 44, 21.1% from 45 to 64, and 26.3% who were 65 years of age or older. The median age was 40 years.

The median income for a household in the city was $20,625, and the median income for a family was $30,417. Males had a median income of $31,250 versus $0 for females. The per capita income for the city was $9,321. None of the population was below the poverty line.

== Education ==
It is zoned to Bottineau Public Schools.
