= Norman Wengert =

American lawyer

Norman I. Wengert
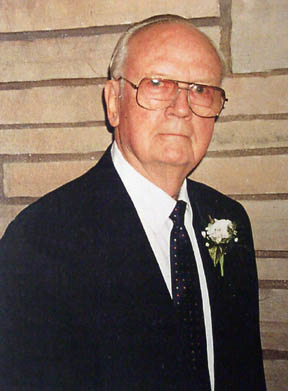
- Born: November 7, 1916; Milwaukee, WI
- Died: July 28, 2001 (aged 84); Stoughton, WI
- Occupation: Professor
- Known for: The "politics of getting."

Norman Irving Wengert (November 7, 1916 – July 28, 2001) was an American political scientist who wrote about the politics of natural resources, advanced a seminal theory of the "politics of getting", and had a number of significant roles in his public and academic career. He was born in Milwaukee, Wisconsin to Eugene F. and Lydia Semmann Wengert. He pioneered the revival of the study of political economy in the United States with publication of Natural Resources and the Political Struggle, and later authored more than fifty monographs and studies on the political economy and public administration of environmental resources. His scholarship explored the politics of natural resources and environmental policy formation and administration, with emphases in national energy policy, urban water planning and management, land use planning and controls, national forest management, and citizen participation in administrative processes.

Wengert helped establish the doctoral program in Environmental Politics and Policy at Colorado State University; published numerous notable scholarly books, research monographs, journal articles and chapters in anthologies; served as a consultant to government agencies, and received numerous awards and honors. He died at age 84 in Stoughton, Wisconsin.

== Early life and education ==
Norman Irving Wengert was born in Milwaukee, Wisconsin on November 7, 1916 to Eugene F. and Lydia Semmann Wengert. During his education he attained degrees in several different fields. He attended Concordia College in Milwaukee during the period 1930–36, and received a bachelor's degree in political science from the University of Wisconsin in 1938 and a master's degree from the Fletcher School of Law and Diplomacy at Tufts University in 1939. He served as an ensign in the U.S. Navy Reserve during 1944–45. Returning to the University of Wisconsin, he was awarded a degree in law from its University of Wisconsin Law School in 1942, and a doctorate in political science in 1947. He was also a member of the Wisconsin Bar Association.

Wengert married Janet Mueller in 1940 and they raised three children: Eugene M., Christine Ann (Davis), and Timothy John.

== Public service and academic career ==
Wengert was employed in several positions by the Tennessee Valley Authority (1941–48); was a member of the Program Staff in the Office of the Secretary, U.S. Department of the Interior (1951–52); was a Research Associate for Resources for the Future (1956), and served as Deputy Director of the National Recreation Survey of the Outdoor Recreation Resources Review Commission (1959–60), which provided the basis for Interior Secretary Stewart Udall's successful program for quadrupling the acreage of the National Park System in eight years, and for enactment of the Land and Water Conservation Fund Act of 1965, providing money for recreational land acquisition. He also served as a member of the Policy Analysis Staff in the Office of the Chief, U.S. Forest Service (1978–79).

Wengert began his academic career as a member of the faculty of City College of New York (1948–51); was Professor of Political Science and Chair of the Social Science Department at North Dakota State University (1952–56); Professor of Public Administration at the University of Maryland, College Park (1956–59); Professor and Chair of the Department of Political Science at Wayne State University (1960–68); Visiting Professor of Public Administration at Pennsylvania State University (1968–69), and Professor of Political Science at Colorado State University (1969–87), where with Henry P. Caulfield, Jr. and Phillip O. Foss he helped establish its doctoral program in Environmental Politics and Policy. During this period he also served as Visiting Research Professor at the U.S. Army Engineering Institute for Water Resources (1969–70), was a Summer Fellow at Fonds für Umweltstudien, in Bonn, Germany (1973), and lectured at the University of Sarajevo in 1978.

Wengert's scholarship explored the politics of natural resources and environmental policy formation and administration, with emphases in national energy policy, urban water planning and management, land use planning and controls, national forest management, and citizen participation in administrative processes. At a time when environmental issues were nascent in the public consciousness, Wengert was one of the few political scientists applying their skills in this area. He achieved some early renown when his book Natural Resources and the Political Struggle which pioneered the revival of political economy in the United States found some popularity among scholars in 1955, but he is probably best known as coeditor and contributor of a timely anthology about the energy crisis that appeared coincidentally during the Arab Oil Embargo of 1973, published by the prestigious American Academy of Political and Social Science. Later in his career he advanced a seminal theory of the "politics of getting" in which he asserted: "American politicians will get as much as they can for their constituents, with only casual attention to the merits of the case and to the extent that they are not likely to be held directly accountable for costs". This theory was accepted by others and extended into the study of international relations and comparative politics. Unafraid of courting controversy, he also published a research monograph that argued that the U.S. Forest Service had substituted its professional values for the legal requirements of their Organic Act of 1897 by allowing timber to be clearcut on the national forests for almost 80 years before they were authorized to do so by the National Forest Management Act of 1976. Overall, he authored more than fifty monographs and studies on the political economy and public administration of environmental resources.

Recognition of his scholarship is evident in Wengert's invitation to testify as an expert witness on "Public Participation in Scientific and Technical Decision Making" during hearings before a subcommittee of the U.S. House of Representatives Committee on Science and Technology in 1977, an uncommon honor for a university professor. On that occasion, his 1976 Natural Resources Journal article "Citizen Participation: Practice in Search of a Theory" was reprinted in the hearings record in its entirety, something that is also unusual for an academic.

Wengert served for many years on the board of directors of the Forest History Society (1979–1987) and as associate editor of the Water Resources Bulletin (1971–1987; now Journal of the American Water Resources Association).

== Consultancies ==
Wengert was Special Advisor to the Government of India on food and agriculture (1959); provided advice to the Federal Aviation Administration (1963); served as research consultant on environmental and natural resources issues for the School of Natural Resources, University of Michigan (1968–69); on environmental impact assessment of water projects for the U.S. Army Corps of Engineers (1968); with Thorne Ecological Institute (1972–75); Atlantic Richfield Oil Corporation (1973–74); the U.S. Department of the Interior's Office of Water Resources and Technology (1973–75); the National Water Quality Commission (1974–81); the Western Interstate Nuclear Board (1975–76) and for the states of Colorado, Maryland, Georgia, and Michigan on numerous occasions.

== Honors and recognition ==
Wengert was invited to present the prestigious annual Royer Lecture at the Institute for Governmental Studies, University of California, Berkeley in 1975. The Royer Lecture series in political economy, one of the oldest in the United States, was funded by a bequest in 1879 to the University of California by Herman Royer.

Wengert was inducted into the prestigious Order of the Coif legal honor society and was editor of the University of Wisconsin Law Review while in law school, was a member of Sigma Xi, the national Scientific Research Society, and Phi Kappa Phi, the national honor society, and is listed in Who's Who in America.

== Selected publications ==
- "The Land, TVA, and the Fertilizer Industry." Land Economics. 25 (February 1949): 11–21.
- "TVA: Symbol and Reality." Journal of Politics. 13 (August 1952): 369–392.
- Valley of Tomorrow: TVA and Agriculture. Knoxville: Bureau of Public Administration, University of Tennessee, 1952.
- "Program Planning in the U.S. Department of the Interior" (coauthor). Public Administration Review. 14 (Summer 1954): 193–201.
- Natural Resources and the Political Struggle. Garden City, New York: Doubleday, 1955.
- "Public Administration and Policy Formation". Southwestern Social Science Quarterly, 39(September): 158–159, 1958.
- Perspectives on Government and Science. Philadelphia: American Academy of Political and Social Science, 1960.
- Administration of Natural Resources: The American Experience. New York: Asia Publishing House, 1961.
- Political Dynamics of Environmental Control, with Dennis C. McElrath and Daniel R. Grant. Bloomington, Indiana: Institute of Public Administration, Indiana University, 1967.
- Urban Water Policies and Decision Making, with George M. Walker, Jr. Washington, DC: U.S. Department of the Interior, Office of Water Resources Research, 1970.
- Urban–Metropolitan Institutions for Water Planning, Development and Management. Fort Collins: Environmental Resources Center, Colorado State University, 1972.
- Institutions for Urban–Metropolitan Water Management: Essays in Social Theory. Fort Collins: Environmental Resources Center, Colorado State University, 1972.
- The Energy Crisis: Reality or Myth, with Robert M. Lawrence. Philadelphia: American Academy of Political and Social Science, 1973.
- Impact on the Human Environment of Proposed Oil Shale Development in Garfield County. Boulder: Thorne Ecological Institute, 1974.
- Community Development Studies. Denver: Colony Development Corporation, 1974.
- Property Rights in Land: A Comparative Exploration of German and American Concepts and Problems. Fort Collins: Environmental Resources Center, Colorado State University, 1974.
- Public Participation in Water Resources Development with a View to the Improvement of the Human Environment. Fort Collins: Environmental Resources Center, Colorado State University, 1974.
- Patterns, Policies, and Problems in Colorado Land Use and Development: Transferable Development Rights and Land Use Control, with Thomas Graham. Fort Collins: Cooperative Extension Service, Colorado State University, 1975.
- The Political Allocation of Burdens and Benefits: Externalities and Due Process in Environmental Protection. Berkeley: Institute of Governmental Studies, University of California, 1976.
- Regional Factors in Siting and Planning Energy Facilities in the Eleven Western States: A Report to the Western Interstate Nuclear Board, with Robert M. Lawrence and Michael S. Hamilton. Lakewood, Colorado: Western Interstate Nuclear Board, 1976.
- The Physical and Economic Effects on the Local Agricultural Economy of Water Transfer from Irrigation Companies to Cities in the Northern Denver Metropolitan Area, with Raymond Lloyd Anderson and Robert D. Heil. Fort Collins: Environmental Resources Center, Colorado State University, 1976.
- "The Energy Boom Town: an Analysis of the Politics of Getting." Policy Studies Journal, 7(Autumn): 17–23, 1978.
- "The Energy Boom Town: An Analysis of the Politics of Getting." In Robert M. Lawrence and Norman I. Wengert, eds. New Dimensions to Energy Policy. Lexington, Massachusetts: Lexington Books, 17–24.
- The Purposes of the National Forests: A Historical Re-interpretation of Policy Development, with A. A. Dyer. Fort Collins: Colorado State University, 1979.
- "Symposium on Land Use Planning." Natural Resources Journal. vol. 19, #1. 1979. (editor).
- Environmental, Legal, and Political Constraints on Power Plant Siting in the Southwestern United States: A Report to the Los Alamos Scientific Laboratory, with Michael S. Hamilton. Fort Collins, Colorado: Colorado State University Experiment Station, 1980.
- Summaries of Selected Federal Statutes Affecting Environmental Quality, with Michael S. Hamilton. Fort Collins: Colorado State University, Cooperative Extension Service, 1980.
- "Land Use Policy." Encyclopedia of Policy Studies, 2d ed, Stuart Nagel, ed. Boca Raton: CRC Press, 1994.
