= Rail Prairie Township, Morrison County, Minnesota =

Rail Prairie Township, Minnesota
- Township
- Location within the state of Minnesota Rail Prairie Township, Minnesota (the United States)
- Coordinates: 46°14′44″N 94°27′2″W
- Country: United States
- State: Minnesota
- County: Morrison

Area
  - Total: 41.4 sq mi (107.2 km^{2})
  - Land: 39.4 sq mi (102.0 km^{2})
  - Water: 2.0 sq mi (5.2 km^{2})
- Elevation: 1,316 ft (401 m)

Population (2000)
  - Total: 143
  - Density: 3.6/sq mi (1.4/km^{2})
- Time zone: UTC-6 (Central (CST))
  - Summer (DST): UTC-5 (CDT)
- FIPS code: 27-52954
- GNIS feature ID: 0665372

Rail Prairie Township was a township in Morrison County, Minnesota, United States. The population was 143 at the 2000 census. According to the U. S. Census Bureau it was merged with Scandia Valley Township on 31 December 2002.

Rail Prairie Township was organized in 1890, and named for Case Rail, an early settler.

== Geography ==
According to the United States Census Bureau, the township had a total area of 41.4 square miles (107.2 km^{2}), of which, 39.4 square miles (102.0 km^{2}) of it was land and 2.0 square miles (5.2 km^{2}) of it (4.86%) was water.

== Demographics ==
As of the census of 2000, there were 143 people, 61 households, and 43 families residing in the township. The population density was 3.6 people per square mile (1.4/km^{2}). There were 139 housing units at an average density of 3.5/sq mi (1.4/km^{2}). The racial makeup of the township was 100.00% White.

There were 61 households, out of which 18.0% had children under the age of 18 living with them, 68.9% were married couples living together, 1.6% had a female householder with no husband present, and 27.9% were non-families. 26.2% of all households were made up of individuals, and 16.4% had someone living alone who was 65 years of age or older. The average household size was 2.34 and the average family size was 2.80.

In the township the population was spread out, with 18.2% under the age of 18, 7.0% from 18 to 24, 22.4% from 25 to 44, 28.0% from 45 to 64, and 24.5% who were 65 years of age or older. The median age was 47 years. For every 100 females, there were 104.3 males. For every 100 females age 18 and over, there were 105.3 males.

The median income for a household in the township was $33,958, and the median income for a family was $34,583. Males had a median income of $39,375 versus $21,250 for females. The per capita income for the township was $18,184. There were none of the families and 1.5% of the population living below the poverty line, including no under eighteens and 4.9% of those over 64.
