= Amity Township, Bottineau County, North Dakota =

Amity Township
- Township
- Location of Amity Township
- Coordinates: 48°46′00″N 100°25′02″W
- Country: United States
- State: North Dakota
- County: Bottineau
- Organized: 1910

Area
  - Total: 36.14 sq mi (93.6 km^{2})
  - Land: 36.04 sq mi (93.3 km^{2})
  - Water: 0.10 sq mi (0.26 km^{2})
- Elevation: 1,535 ft (468 m)

Population (2020)
  - Total: 31
  - Density: 1/sq mi (0.39/km^{2})
- Time zone: UTC-6 (Central (CST))
  - Summer (DST): UTC-5 (CDT)
- Area code: 701
- FIPS code: 38-02100
- GNIS feature ID: 1759265

Amity Township is a civil township in Bottineau County in the U.S. state of North Dakota. As of the 2020 census, its population was 31.

== Geography ==
Amity Township is located in survey township 161N, Range 75W.

== History ==
Amity Township was organized in 1910 from Amity School Township.
