= Brander Township, Bottineau County, North Dakota =

Brander Township
- Township
- Location of Brander Township
- Coordinates: 48°45′42″N 101°02′38″W
- Country: United States
- State: North Dakota
- County: Bottineau

Government
  - Mayor: Dylan Stratton

Population (2010)
  - Total: 54
- Time zone: UTC-6 (Central (CST))
  - Summer (DST): UTC-5 (CDT)

Brander Township is a civil township in Bottineau County in the U.S. state of North Dakota. As of the 2010 census, its population was 54. One unincorporated community in Brander Township is the city of Dunning.
