= Homen Township, Bottineau County, North Dakota =

Homen Township
- Township
- Location of Homen Township
- Coordinates: 48°54′37″N 100°19′25″W
- Country: United States
- State: North Dakota
- County: Bottineau

Population (2010)
  - Total: 118
- Time zone: UTC-6 (Central (CST))
  - Summer (DST): UTC-5 (CDT)

Homen Township is a civil township in Bottineau County, North Dakota, United States. As of the 2010 census, its population was 118.
