= State Bank of Antler =

Historic bank building in North Dakota, United States

- U.S. National Register of Historic Places
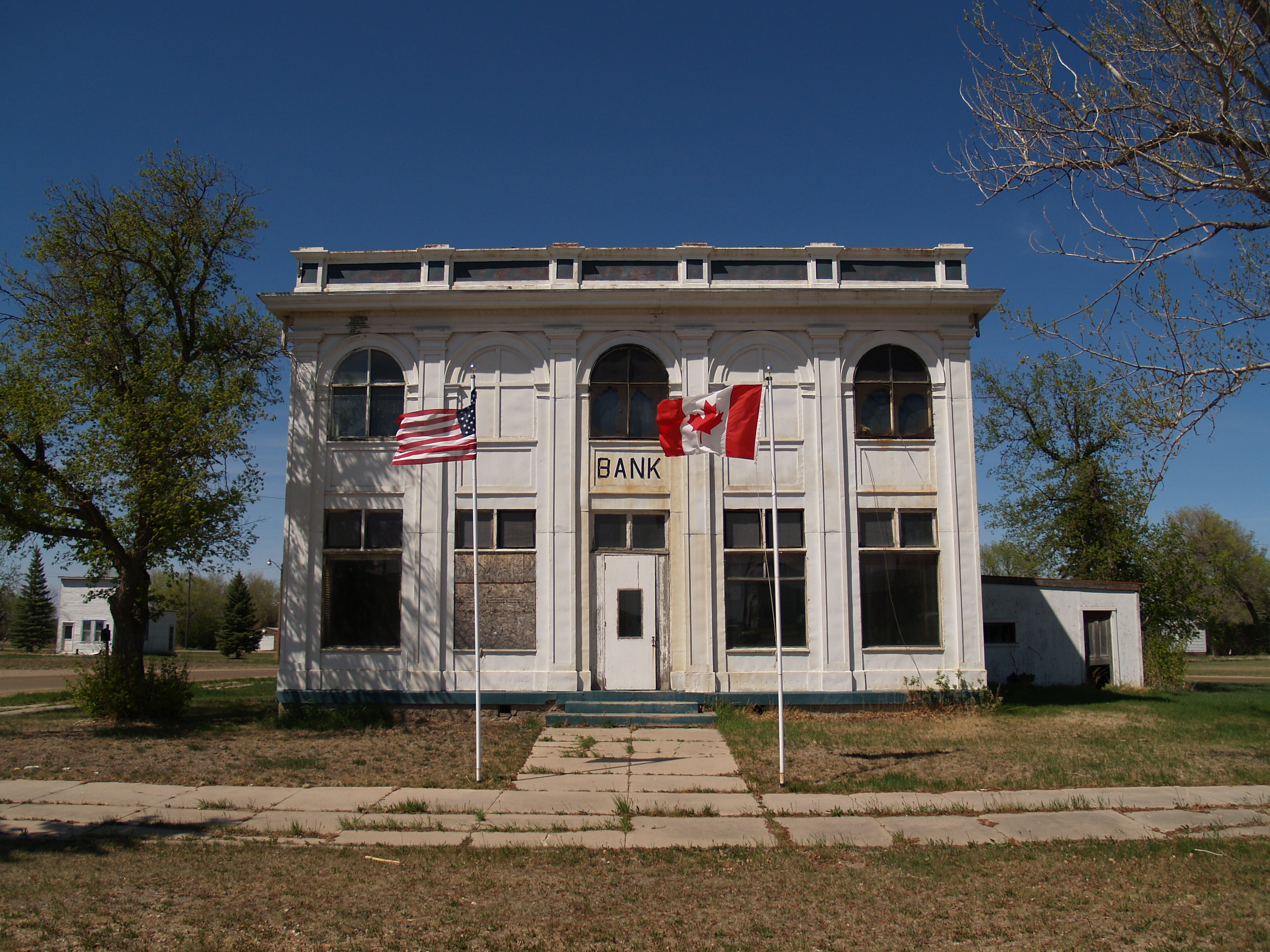
- Building in 2008

- Location within North Dakota Location within the United States
- Location: Antler Sq., Antler, North Dakota
- Coordinates: 48°58′15″N 101°16′56″W
- Area: less than one acre
- Built: 1905
- Architectural style: Classical Revival
- NRHP reference No.: 88000986
- Added to NRHP: June 30, 1988

The State Bank of Antler, also known as the Antler Square Building, is a historic building in Antler, North Dakota, located in the center of the town's public square.

== History ==
The bank was established in 1905 by David Newton Tallman, a former clerk for the Great Northern Railway who developed a number of towns along the railroad, including Antler. It closed amid financial difficulty in 1920 and Tallman sold his interest. It reopened in 1924 as the Union Bank of Antler, which failed in 1931. The building also served as a customs office, telephone office, post office and rooming house. It was listed on the National Register of Historic Places in 1988, at which time it was vacant. Tallman established three other towns on the same plan: Maxbass, Sarles and McCumber. Antler is the only one where the original town square building still stands.

A separate building that once housed the First National Bank was demolished in 2016, and a deregistration statement for the State Bank was mistakenly filed with the National Register. The building was reinstated to the Register in 2019. Local residents have sought to restore it as a museum documenting the town's boom period in the early 20th century.

== Architecture ==
The building features Classical Revival architecture. According to its NRHP nomination, "the State Bank of Antler is one of the most ornate and formal examples of pressed metal architecture in North Dakota."
