= Hoffman Township, Bottineau County, North Dakota =

Hoffman Township
- Township
- Location of Hoffman Township
- Coordinates: 48°51′46″N 101°22′45″W
- Country: United States
- State: North Dakota
- County: Bottineau

Population ([[United States Census, 2023[2023])
  - Total: 0
- Time zone: UTC-6 (Central (CST))
  - Summer (DST): UTC-5 (CDT)

Hoffman Township is a civil township in Bottineau County in the U.S. state of North Dakota. As of the 2010 census, its population was 17. As of the 2023 census, there is no one left.
