= Blaine Township, Bottineau County, North Dakota =

Blaine Township
- Township
- Location of Blaine Township
- Coordinates: 48°41′00″N 101°21′02″W
- Country: United States
- State: North Dakota
- County: Bottineau
- Organized: 1904

Area
  - Total: 36.04 sq mi (93.3 km^{2})
- Elevation: 1,578 ft (481 m)

Population (2009)
  - Total: 27
  - Density: 0.75/sq mi (0.29/km^{2})
- Time zone: UTC-6 (Central (CST))
  - Summer (DST): UTC-5 (CDT)
- Area code: 701
- FIPS code: 38-07540
- GNIS feature ID: 1759267

Blaine Township is a township in Bottineau County in the U.S. state of North Dakota. Its population during the 2000 Census was 30, and an estimated 27 people as of 2009.

== History ==
Blaine Township was organized in 1904.

== Geography ==
Blaine Township is located in Southwest Bottineau County in survey township T160 North, Range 83 West. According to the United States Census Bureau, the township has a total area of 36.04 square miles (93.3 km^{2}), 99.9% of which is land. The nearest cities are Mohall to the northwest and Lansford to the south.

== Demographics ==
Historical population
Census	Pop.	Note	%±
1910	245		—
2000	30		—
2009 (est.)	27

The 2000 Census reported there were 30 people, 10 households, and 8 families residing in the township. The population density was 0.8 square miles (2.1 km^{2}). There were 11 housing units at an average density of 0.3 square miles (0.78 km^{2}). The racial makeup of the township was 100% White. Norwegians (38.5%) and Germans (35.9%) made up the largest two ancestry groups in the township.

Of the 10 households in the township, 40% had children under the age of 18 living with them. married couples made up 60% of the population. Two households (20%) were a non-family households. The average household size was 3.00 people.

Nearly 87% of the township was under the age of 65 at the 2000 Census, with children under the age of 18 making up 40% of the population. The largest group was 45- to 64-year-olds, with 23.3%, followed by 25- to 44-year-olds (20%) and those over 65 (13.3%). Just 3.3% of the population was made up of 18- to 24-year-olds. The median age was 35.5 years.

The median household income for the township was $32,500, and the median family income was $26,875. Per capita income in the township was $13,155.
