= Elysian Township, Bottineau County, North Dakota =

Elysian Township
- Township
- Location of Elysian Township
- Coordinates: 48°39′59″N 100°35′08″W
- Country: United States
- State: North Dakota
- County: Bottineau

Population (2010)
  - Total: 33
- Time zone: UTC-6 (Central (CST))
  - Summer (DST): UTC-5 (CDT)

Elysian Township is a civil township in Bottineau County in the U.S. state of North Dakota. As of the 2010 census, its population was 33.
