= Wellington Township, Bottineau County, North Dakota =

Wellington Township
- Township
- Location of Wellington Township
- Coordinates: 48°35′25″N 100°12′35″W
- Country: United States
- State: North Dakota
- County: Bottineau

Population (2010)
  - Total: 30
- Time zone: UTC-6 (Central (CST))
  - Summer (DST): UTC-5 (CDT)

Wellington Township is a civil township in Bottineau County in the U.S. state of North Dakota. As of the 2010 census, its population was 30.
