= Sherman Township, Bottineau County, North Dakota =

Sherman Township
- Township
- Location of Sherman Township
- Coordinates: 48°51′45″N 101°17′42″W
- Country: United States
- State: North Dakota
- County: Bottineau

Population (2010)
  - Total: 68
- Time zone: UTC-6 (Central (CST))
  - Summer (DST): UTC-5 (CDT)

Sherman Township is a civil township in Bottineau County in the U.S. state of North Dakota. As of the 2010 census, its population was 68.
