= Richburg Township, Bottineau County, North Dakota =

Richburg Township
- Township
- Location of Richburg Township
- Coordinates: 48°56′53″N 101°03′28″W
- Country: United States
- State: North Dakota
- County: Bottineau

Population (2010)
  - Total: 37
- Time zone: UTC-6 (Central (CST))
  - Summer (DST): UTC-5 (CDT)

Richburg Township is a civil township in Bottineau County in the U.S. state of North Dakota. As of the 2010 census, its population was 37.
