= Gardena, North Dakota =

- City
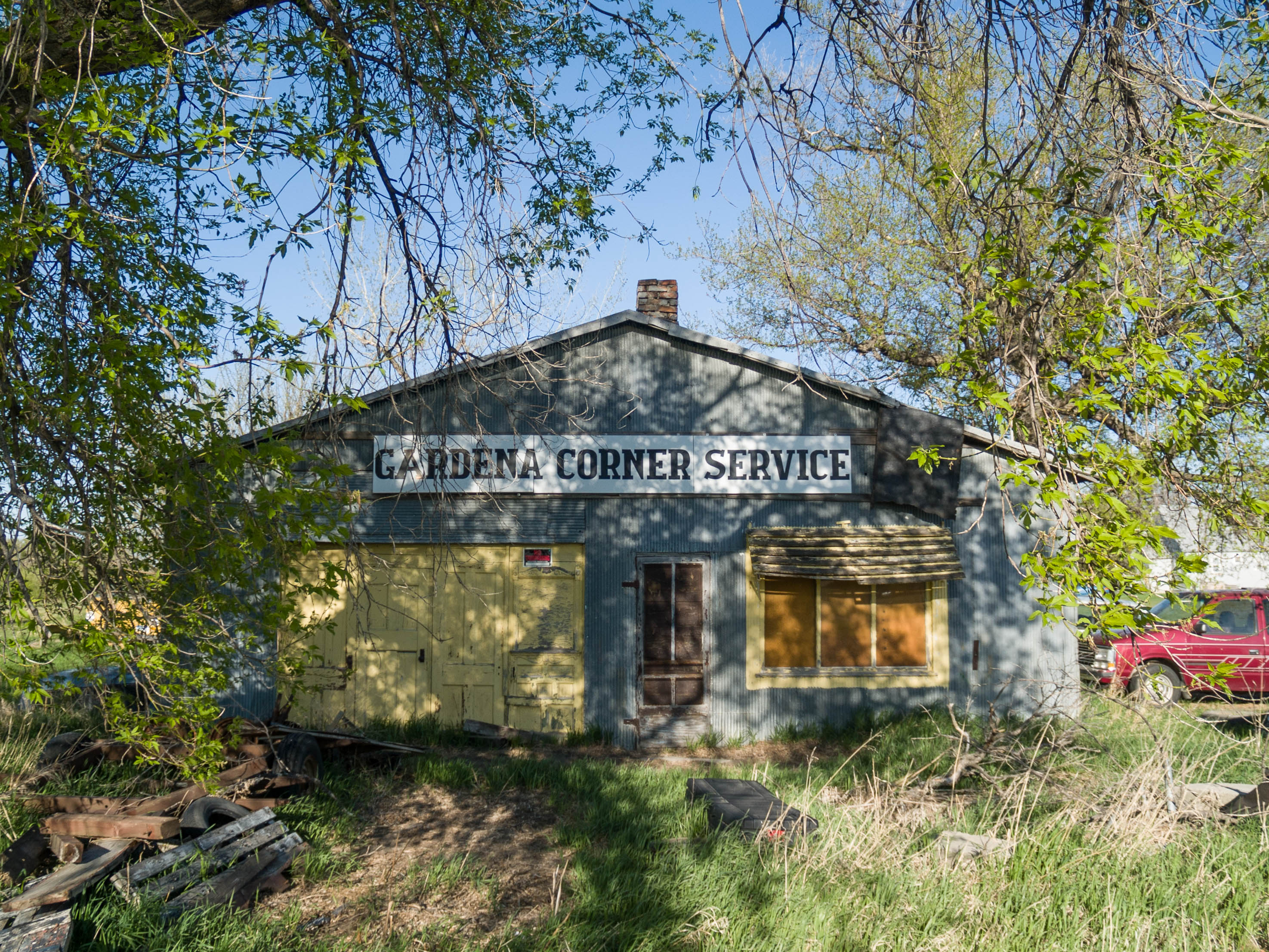
- Gardena

- Location of Gardena, North Dakota
- Coordinates: 48°42′04″N 100°29′53″W
- Country: United States
- State: North Dakota
- County: Bottineau
- Founded: 1905

Area
  - Total: 0.34 sq mi (0.89 km^{2})
  - Land: 0.34 sq mi (0.89 km^{2})
  - Water: 0 sq mi (0.00 km^{2})
- Elevation: 1,467 ft (447 m)

Population (2020)
  - Total: 24
  - Estimate (2024): 23
  - Density: 70/sq mi (26.9/km^{2})
- Time zone: UTC–6 (Central (CST))
  - Summer (DST): UTC–5 (CDT)
- ZIP code: 58748
- Area code: 701
- FIPS code: 38-29180
- GNIS feature ID: 1036050

Gardena is a city in Bottineau County, North Dakota, United States. The population was 24 at the 2020 census. Gardena was founded in 1905.

== Geography ==
According to the United States Census Bureau, the city has a total area of 0.33 square miles (0.85 km^{2}), all land.

== Demographics ==
Historical population
Census	Pop.	Note	%±
1910	119		—
1920	99		−16.8%
1930	120		21.2%
1940	125		4.2%
1950	116		−7.2%
1960	113		−2.6%
1970	84		−25.7%
1980	66		−21.4%
1990	41		−37.9%
2000	38		−7.3%
2010	29		−23.7%
2020	24		−17.2%
2024 (est.)	23		−4.2%
U.S. Decennial Census; 2020 Census

=== 2010 census ===
As of the census of 2010, there were 29 people, 13 households, and 9 families living in the city. The population density was 90.6 inhabitants per square mile (35.0/km^{2}). There were 21 housing units at an average density of 65.6 per square mile (25.3/km^{2}). The racial makeup of the city was 100.0% White.

There were 13 households, of which 15.4% had children under the age of 18 living with them, 46.2% were married couples living together, 15.4% had a female householder with no husband present, 7.7% had a male householder with no wife present, and 30.8% were non-families. 23.1% of all households were made up of individuals, and 7.7% had someone living alone who was 65 years of age or older. The average household size was 2.23 and the average family size was 2.56.

The median age in the city was 43.5 years. 10.3% of residents were under the age of 18; 20.6% were between the ages of 18 and 24; 20.6% were from 25 to 44; 31% were from 45 to 64; and 17.2% were 65 years of age or older. The gender makeup of the city was 58.6% male and 41.4% female.

=== 2000 census ===
As of the census of 2000, there were 38 people, 13 households, and 7 families living in the city. The population density was 115.6 inhabitants per square mile (44.6/km^{2}). There were 21 housing units at an average density of 63.9 per square mile (24.7/km^{2}). The racial makeup of the city was 97.37% White, 2.63% from other races. Hispanic or Latino of any race were 2.63% of the population.

There were 13 households, out of which 30.8% had children under the age of 18 living with them, 61.5% were married couples living together, and 38.5% were non-families. 30.8% of all households were made up of individuals, and 15.4% had someone living alone who was 65 years of age or older. The average household size was 2.92 and the average family size was 4.00.

In the city, the population was spread out, with 36.8% under the age of 18, 18.4% from 18 to 24, 13.2% from 25 to 44, 26.3% from 45 to 64, and 5.3% who were 65 years of age or older. The median age was 22 years. For every 100 females, there were 72.7 males. For every 100 females age 18 and over, there were 71.4 males.

The median income for a household in the city was $26,250, and the median income for a family was $31,250. Males had a median income of $30,625 versus $3,750 for females. The per capita income for the city was $8,443. None of the population and none of the families were below the poverty line.

== Education ==
It is zoned to Bottineau Public Schools.
