= Omemee, North Dakota =

- Ghost town
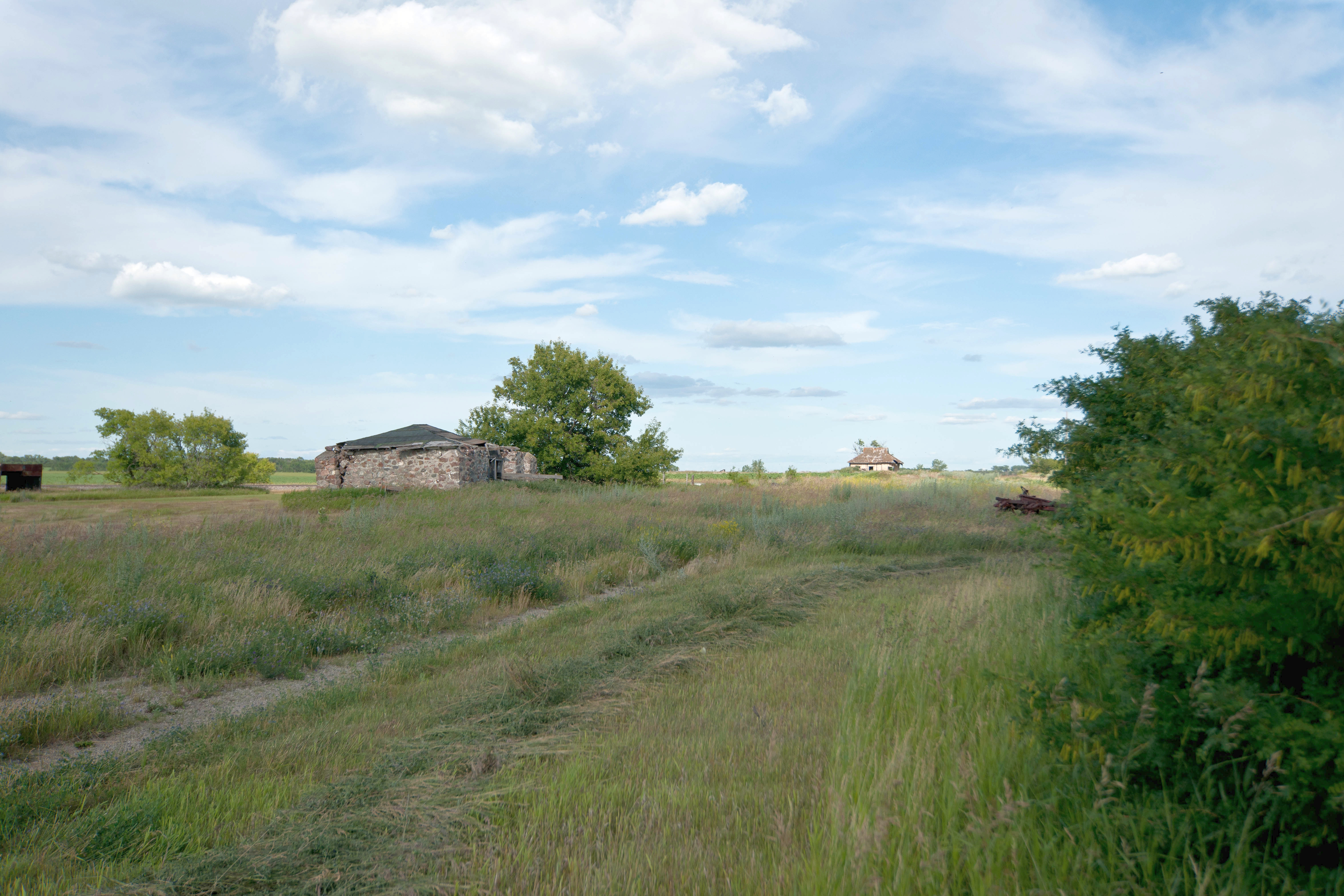
- Omemee

- Location of Omemee, North Dakota

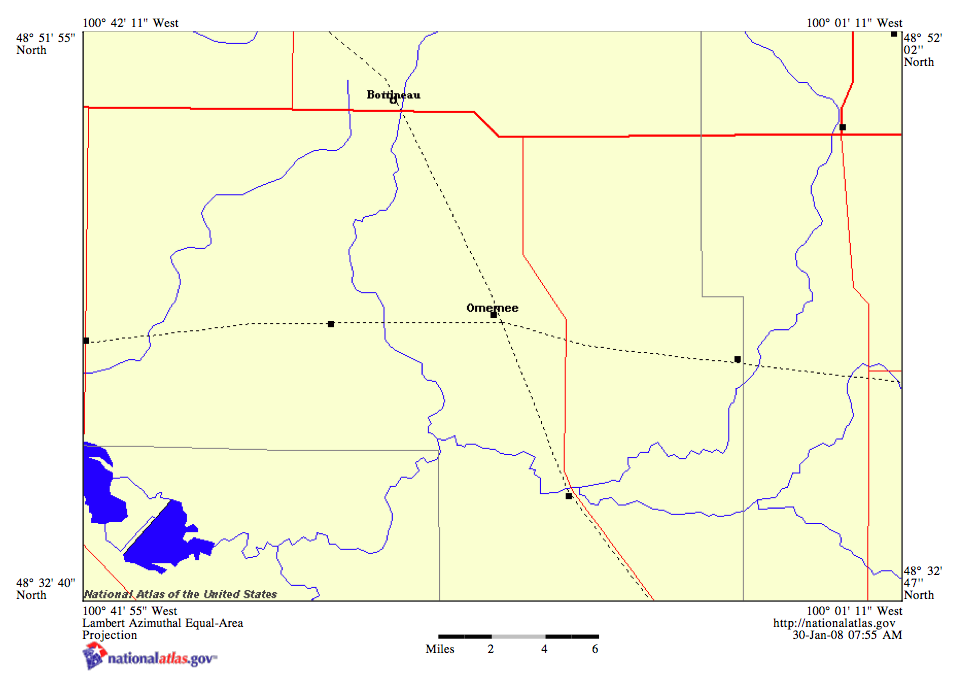
- Omemee at center
- Coordinates: 48°42′23″N 100°21′18″W
- Country: United States
- State: North Dakota
- County: Bottineau County
- Township: Willow Vale
- Legislative district: 6th
- Founded: 1887
- Incorporated: 1902
- Disincorporated: ca. 1990
- Elevation: 1,513 ft (461 m)

Population (1980)
  - Total: 10
- Time zone: UTC-6 (Central (CST))
  - Summer (DST): UTC-5 (CDT)
- Area code: 701
- FIPS code: 38-59420
- GNIS feature ID: 1030570

Omemee is a ghost town in Bottineau County in the U.S. state of North Dakota. It was a railroad hub in the early 1910s, located at the junction of two major railroads, the Soo Line Railroad and the Great Northern Railway. Incorporated as a city in 1902, (Note: All incorporated communities in North Dakota are called "cities" regardless of their size.) Omemee has been abandoned since 2003.

== History ==
Omemee was founded in 1887 in Willow Vale Township. It is named after Omemee, Ontario, in Canada, which was the hometown of Omemee's first post master. Omemee itself is an alternate spelling of the Ojibwe word omimi, meaning "dove." The post office opened in 1890 and closed in 1967, with mail service transferring to nearby Willow City. The town was incorporated in 1902 and was moved slightly in 1903 to the junction of the Great Northern Railway and the Soo Line Railway in 1903. Omemee disincorporated as a city prior to the 1990 census. It currently has no population.

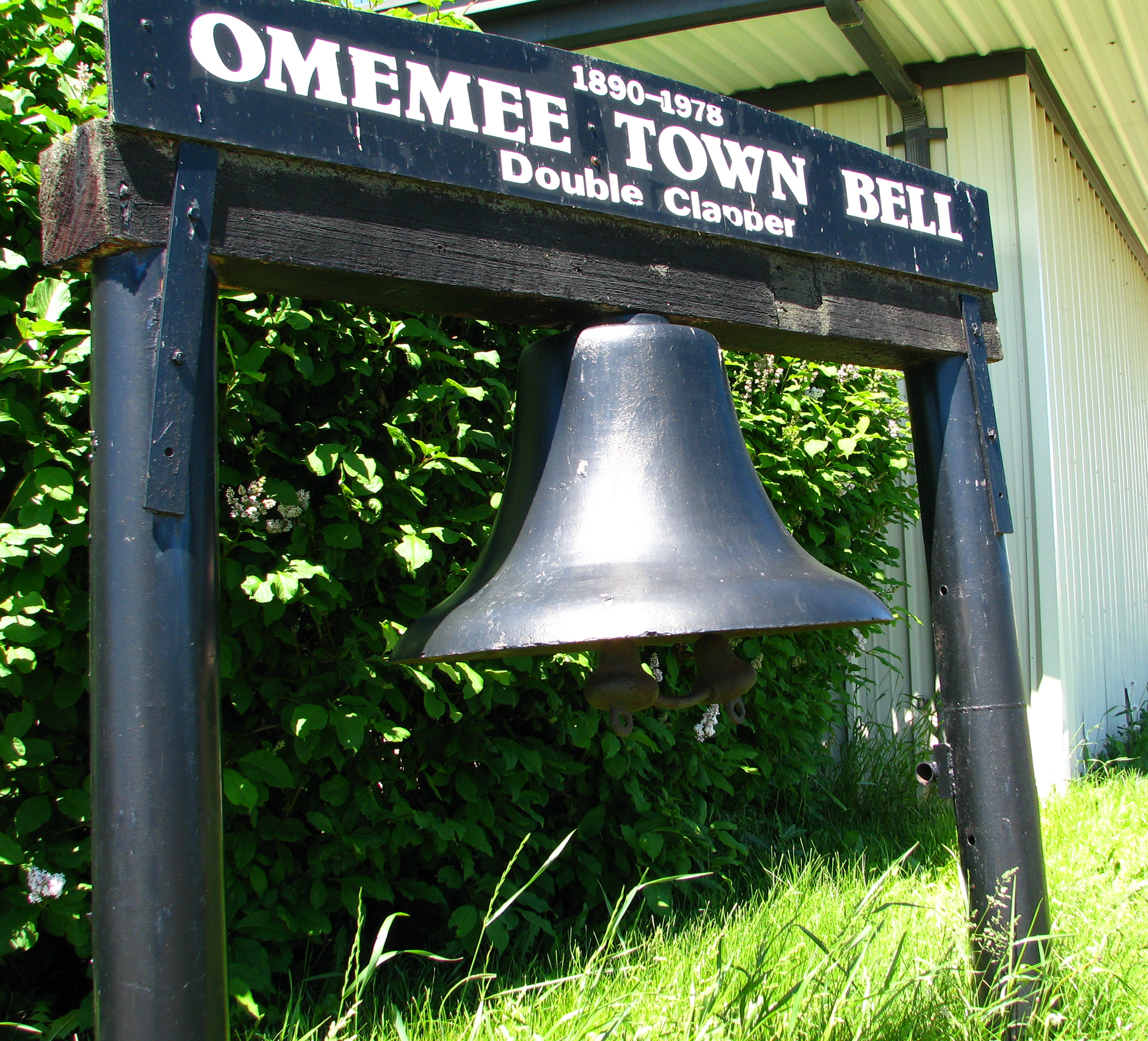
Omemee town bell, at Bottineau Country Historical Museum

A 1906 review by the North Dakota Department of Agriculture and Labor indicated Omemee was the fourth largest town in Bottineau County. However, by the time it was founded, the cities of Bottineau and Willow City had grown to dominate trade in the region. Omemee, located between both towns was at a disadvantage, since many farmers had grown accustomed to doing business in those towns. Many predicted its status as a hub between two railroads would lead to substantial growth, making Omemee the railroad center of Bottineau County.

In 1906, the town already boasted numerous businesses, including general stores, banks, hotels, a restaurant, school, opera house, and a newspaper, the Omemee Herald. Omemee Brick Company operated a plant three miles north of town. The town also claimed it had "one of the best brass bands in the state" at 22 members, and the only musical organization in the state with "a quartette of saxophones [sic.]." With a lack of a townsite company to promote the town, the predicted population boom never came and the town declined in later years.

In 1998, the Canadian Museum of Rail Travel in Cranbrook, British Columbia, British Columbia, bought and restored a 1906 sleeper car. Originally built by Barney and Smith Car Company, the railcar was previously owned by a former Soo Line Railroad employee, and was named Omemee in honor of the old rail station. The car is now on permanent display at the museum. Today, nothing remains of the town except for an abandoned electric line and two crumbling buildings.

The town bell of Omemee now hangs on display in front of the Bottineau County Historical Museum in Bottineau

=== Land sale controversy ===
In the early 2000s, real estate developers began selling lots in Omemee to buyers in the United States, Canada, Australia, New Zealand and Germany. Advertisements described a typical lot as "a great retirement home site and a superb investment"; however, county officials contradicted those claims saying the lots were "unfit for development". Many buyers purchased the lots site-unseen through eBay or other online providers. Some buyers treated the purchases as investments, with no intent to ever build or move to North Dakota, while others felt they were misled once they saw the nature of the property they had purchased. Some property owners complained to the North Dakota Attorney General's office, which found no misrepresentations to prosecute.

== Geography ==
Omemee is located in the eastern part of Bottineau County. It lies in the Souris River basin, which is part of the ancient lake bed of Lake Souris, a large glacial lake in the area responsible for much of the surrounding geology. East of the town, undulations of the prairie rise often ten feet above the adjoining hollows. These swells form the moraines which were not entirely leveled down by the waves of the lake. The high and rugged hills of the same moraines beyond the lake shore show how much the action of the waves leveled the hills which were deposited in the waters of the lake.

== Demographics ==
Historical population
Census	Pop.	Note	%±
1910	332		—
1920	222		−33.1%
1930	170		−23.4%
1940	123		−27.6%
1950	60		−51.2%
1960	11		−81.7%
1970	5		−54.5%
1980	10		100.0%
U.S. Decennial Census

The city had a high population of 650 in 1906, but by the 1910 census it had declined to 332. The population declined steadily in double-digit percentages every decade thereafter, until the 1970 census when the recorded population was just 5 people. However, the 1980 census showed a population increase to 10 people.

When Omemee disincorporated, the 1990 census reported only three remaining residents. The area reverted to Willow Vale Township, which recorded a 2000 census population of 34.

German settlers established an evangelical church in Omemee in the early 1900s.

== Notable people ==
- Matt Johnson (1872–1935), editor of the Omemee Herald and North Dakota state representative
