= Mount Rose Township, Bottineau County, North Dakota =

Mount Rose Township
- Township
- Location of Mount Rose Township
- Coordinates: 48°40′46″N 101°15′19″W
- Country: United States
- State: North Dakota
- County: Bottineau

Population (2010)
  - Total: 59
- Time zone: UTC-6 (Central (CST))
  - Summer (DST): UTC-5 (CDT)

Mount Rose Township is a civil township in Bottineau County in the U.S. state of North Dakota. As of the 2010 census, its population was 59.

Houses built decreased from 103 in 1939 to 0 by 1990.
