= Cut Bank Township, Bottineau County, North Dakota =

Cut Bank Township
- Township
- Location of Cut Bank Township
- Coordinates: 48°47′11″N 101°23′24″W
- Country: United States
- State: North Dakota
- County: Bottineau

Population (2010)
  - Total: 37
- Time zone: UTC-6 (Central (CST))
  - Summer (DST): UTC-5 (CDT)

Cut Bank Township is a civil township in Bottineau County in the U.S. state of North Dakota. As of the 2010 census, its population was 37.
