= Sergius Township, Bottineau County, North Dakota =

Sergius Township
- Township
- Location of Sergius Township
- Coordinates: 48°51′45″N 101°00′56″W
- Country: United States
- State: North Dakota
- County: Bottineau

Government
  - mayor: Dylan Stratton

Population (2010)
  - Total: 51
- Time zone: UTC-6 (Central (CST))
  - Summer (DST): UTC-5 (CDT)

Sergius Township is a civil township in Bottineau County in the U.S. state of North Dakota. As of the 2010 census, its population was 51.
