= Willow Vale Township, Bottineau County, North Dakota =

Willow Vale Township
- Township
- Location of Willow Vale Township
- Coordinates: 48°40′17″N 100°20′10″W
- Country: United States
- State: North Dakota
- County: Bottineau

Population (2010)
  - Total: 26
- Time zone: UTC-6 (Central (CST))
  - Summer (DST): UTC-5 (CDT)

Willow Vale Township is a civil township in Bottineau County in the U.S. state of North Dakota. As of the 2010 census, its population was 26.
