= Scandia Township, Bottineau County, North Dakota =

Civil township in North Dakota, U.S.

- Location of Scandia Township within Bottineau County, North Dakota
- Coordinates: 48°57′00″N 100°47′02″W
- Country: United States
- State: North Dakota
- County: Bottineau

Area
  - Total: 43.9 sq mi (113.7 km^{2})
  - Land: 43.9 sq mi (113.7 km^{2})
  - Water: 0 sq mi (0 km^{2})

Population (2020)
  - Total: 50
  - Density: 1.1/sq mi (0.44/km^{2})
- Time zone: UTC-6 (Central (CST))
  - Summer (DST): UTC-5 (CDT)

Scandia Township is a civil township in Bottineau County in the U.S. state of North Dakota. As of the 2000 census, its population was 54.
