= Cecil Township, Bottineau County, North Dakota =

Cecil Township
- Township
- Location of Cecil Township
- Coordinates: 48°40′32″N 100°12′41″W
- Country: United States
- State: North Dakota
- County: Bottineau
- Organized: 1910

Area
  - Total: 35.35 sq mi (91.6 km^{2})
  - Land: 35.19 sq mi (91.1 km^{2})
  - Water: 0.16 sq mi (0.41 km^{2})
- Elevation: 1,535 ft (468 m)

Population (2000)
  - Total: 28
  - Density: 0.8/sq mi (0.31/km^{2})
- Time zone: UTC-6 (Central (CST))
  - Summer (DST): UTC-5 (CDT)
- Area code: 701
- FIPS code: 38-009-13060
- GNIS feature ID: 1759269

Cecil Township is a civil township in Bottineau County in the U.S. state of North Dakota. As of the 2000 census, its population was 28.

== Geography ==
Cecil Township is located in survey township 160N, Range 74W.

=== Streams ===
- Miller Creek
- Willow Creek

== History ==
Cecil Township was organized in 1910 from Lincoln School Township.

The Soo Line Railroad was a major transportation route in the township. Overly, North Dakota in the eastern part of the township was a railroad hub, including a roundhouse for servicing locomotives. Overly also served as a way station for rail crews traveling east and west.

In 1908 railroad officials established a second siding 5 miles (8.0 km) west of the city of Overly, and named the site Tasco ("clay earth"). It was reportedly named after the town of Tasco in Sheridan County, Kansas. Grain elevators were constructed and operated at the site, but the area saw little development. Tasco is located at 48°41′14″N 100°15′18″W.

French settlers moved to Cecil Township around 1900 and established a small community about 4 miles (6.4 km) south of Overly that they named Little Fargo. The settlers originally moved to the area from Wild Rice, then a French settlement near Fargo. Settlers built a church they called the "Mission of St. Genevieve," which was moved to Overly in 1921. Today, all that remains of Little Fargo is its cemetery, located at 48.6441°N 100.1890°W.

=== Schools ===
- Cote School No 2
- Lincoln School No. 2 (Abandoned)

== Cities and populated places ==
- Overly
