= Westhope, North Dakota =

- City
- Location of Westhope, North Dakota
- Coordinates: 48°54′40″N 101°01′04″W
- Country: United States
- State: North Dakota
- County: Bottineau
- Founded: 1903

Government
  - Mayor: Russell Ballantyne

Area
  - Total: 0.32 sq mi (0.84 km^{2})
  - Land: 0.32 sq mi (0.84 km^{2})
  - Water: 0 sq mi (0.00 km^{2})
- Elevation: 1,499 ft (457 m)

Population (2020)
  - Total: 374
  - Estimate (2022): 377
  - Density: 1,156.2/sq mi (446.43/km^{2})
- Time zone: UTC-6 (Central (CST))
  - Summer (DST): UTC-5 (CDT)
- ZIP code: 58793
- Area code: 701
- FIPS code: 38-85020
- GNIS feature ID: 1036323
- Website: westhopend.com

Westhope is a city in Bottineau County, North Dakota, United States. The population was 374 at the 2020 census. Westhope was founded in 1903 along a Great Northern Railway branch line that began in Rugby. The name was based on the slogan "Hope of the West," created by Great Northern officials to promote prosperity for the new town.

== Geography ==
According to the United States Census Bureau, the city has a total area of 0.33 square miles (0.85 km^{2}), all land.

=== Climate ===
Climate data for Westhope, North Dakota
Month	Jan	Feb	Mar	Apr	May	Jun	Jul	Aug	Sep	Oct	Nov	Dec	Year
Record high °F (°C)	46 (8)	63 (17)	77 (25)	95 (35)	100 (38)	101 (38)	104 (40)	106 (41)	99 (37)	93 (34)	74 (23)	58 (14)	106 (41)
Mean daily maximum °F (°C)	17 (−8)	23 (−5)	35 (2)	57 (14)	69 (21)	77 (25)	82 (28)	82 (28)	71 (22)	55 (13)	35 (2)	20 (−7)	52 (11)
Mean daily minimum °F (°C)	−2 (−19)	4 (−16)	17 (−8)	30 (−1)	42 (6)	52 (11)	56 (13)	54 (12)	44 (7)	31 (−1)	17 (−8)	2 (−17)	29 (−2)
Record low °F (°C)	−43 (−42)	−47 (−44)	−37 (−38)	−13 (−25)	13 (−11)	28 (−2)	33 (1)	29 (−2)	17 (−8)	−9 (−23)	−27 (−33)	−41 (−41)	−47 (−44)
Average precipitation inches (mm)	0.52 (13)	0.46 (12)	0.84 (21)	1.09 (28)	2.35 (60)	3.42 (87)	2.88 (73)	2.01 (51)	1.39 (35)	1.29 (33)	0.67 (17)	0.53 (13)	17.45 (443)

== Demographics ==
Historical population
Census	Pop.	Note	%±
1910	592		—
1920	439		−25.8%
1930	521		18.7%
1940	460		−11.7%
1950	575		25.0%
1960	824		43.3%
1970	705		−14.4%
1980	741		5.1%
1990	578		−22.0%
2000	533		−7.8%
2010	429		−19.5%
2020	374		−12.8%
2022 (est.)	377		0.8%
U.S. Decennial Census; 2020 Census

=== 2010 census ===
As of the census of 2010, there were 429 people, 190 households, and 117 families living in the city. The population density was 1,300.0 inhabitants per square mile (501.9/km^{2}). There were 218 housing units at an average density of 660.6 per square mile (255.1/km^{2}). The racial makeup of the city was 95.1% White, 1.2% Native American, 0.2% Asian, 0.2% Pacific Islander, and 3.3% from two or more races. Hispanic or Latino of any race were 0.5% of the population.

There were 190 households, of which 22.1% had children under the age of 18 living with them, 52.6% were married couples living together, 4.7% had a female householder with no husband present, 4.2% had a male householder with no wife present, and 38.4% were non-families. 35.3% of all households were made up of individuals, and 18.9% had someone living alone who was 65 years of age or older. The average household size was 2.15 and the average family size was 2.78.

The median age in the city was 49.5 years. 18.6% of residents were under the age of 18; 5.2% were between the ages of 18 and 24; 19.9% were from 25 to 44; 33.1% were from 45 to 64; and 23.3% were 65 years of age or older. The gender makeup of the city was 50.6% male and 49.4% female.

=== 2000 census ===
As of the census of 2000, there were 533 people, 228 households, and 134 families living in the city. The population density was 1,663.5 inhabitants per square mile (642.3/km^{2}). There were 268 housing units at an average density of 836.5 per square mile (323.0/km^{2}). The racial makeup of the city was 98.31% White, 0.94% Native American, and 0.75% from two or more races.

There were 228 households, out of which 23.7% had children under the age of 18 living with them, 50.4% were married couples living together, 5.7% had a female householder with no husband present, and 41.2% were non-families. 40.4% of all households were made up of individuals, and 24.6% had someone living alone who was 65 years of age or older. The average household size was 2.14 and the average family size was 2.90.

In the city, the population was spread out, with 20.5% under the age of 18, 4.9% from 18 to 24, 19.5% from 25 to 44, 26.8% from 45 to 64, and 28.3% who were 65 years of age or older. The median age was 48 years. For every 100 females, there were 87.0 males. For every 100 females age 18 and over, there were 82.0 males.

The median income for a household in the city was $26,964, and the median income for a family was $30,938. Males had a median income of $24,554 versus $14,792 for females. The per capita income for the city was $18,252. About 10.1% of families and 8.7% of the population were below the poverty line, including 6.2% of those under age 18 and 18.2% of those age 65 or over.

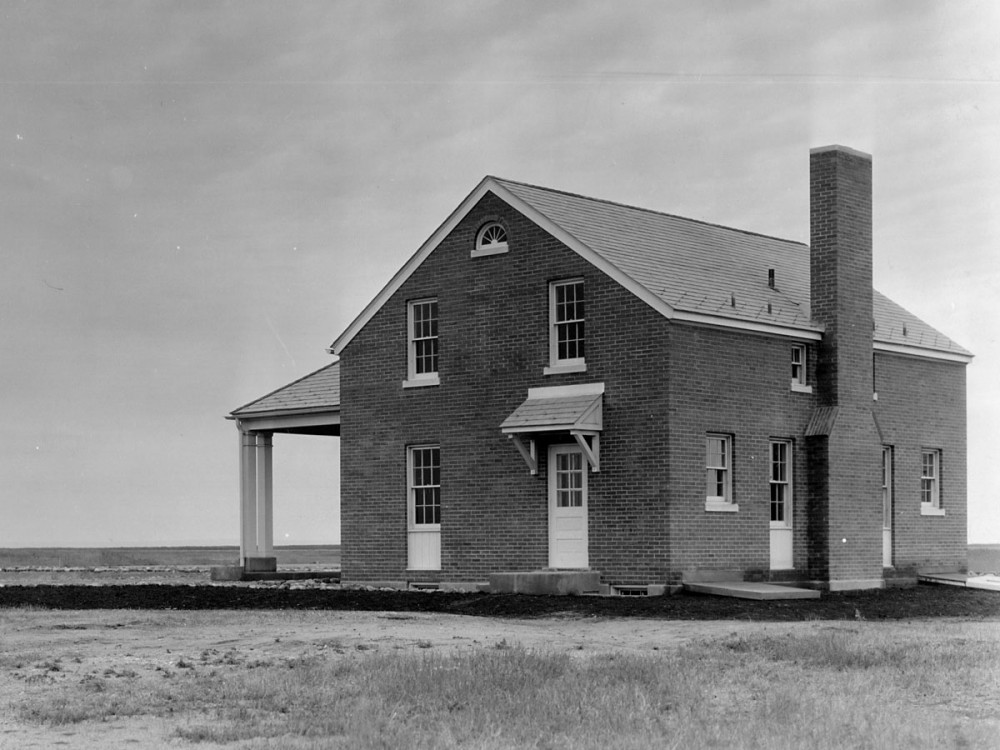
Westhope border station, 1937
