= Scandia Valley Township, Morrison County, Minnesota =

Scandia Valley Township, Minnesota
- Township
- Location within the state of Minnesota Scandia Valley Township, Minnesota (the United States)
- Coordinates: 46°13′19″N 94°35′40″W
- Country: United States
- State: Minnesota
- County: Morrison

Area
  - Total: 80.1 sq mi (207.5 km^{2})
  - Land: 69.4 sq mi (179.8 km^{2})
  - Water: 10.7 sq mi (27.7 km^{2})
- Elevation: 1,299 ft (396 m)

Population (2010)
  - Total: 1,191
  - Density: 17.2/sq mi (6.63/km^{2})
- Time zone: UTC-6 (Central (CST))
  - Summer (DST): UTC-5 (CDT)
- FIPS code: 27-58918
- GNIS feature ID: 0665565
- Website: https://scandiavalleytownshipmn.gov/

Scandia Valley Township is a township in Morrison County, Minnesota, United States. The population was 1,074 at the 2000 census. According to the U. S. Census Bureau it was merged with Rail Prairie Township on 31 December 2002. The larger township reported a population of 1,191 inhabitants in the 2010 census.

Scandia Valley Township was organized in 1893. The township was originally built up chiefly by Scandinavian immigrants, hence the name.

== Geography ==
According to the United States Census Bureau, as of the 2000 census the township had a total area of 38.7 square miles (100.3 km^{2}), of which 30.1 square miles (78.0 km^{2}) was land and 8.6 square miles (22.3 km^{2}) (22.24%) was water. With the intervening addition of the former Rail Prairie Township, the 2010 census reported the township's area rising to those given in the infobox at right.

== Demographics ==
As of the census of 2000, there were 1,074 people, 489 households, and 337 families residing in the township. The population density was 35.7 inhabitants per square mile (13.8/km^{2}). There were 1,423 housing units at an average density of 47.3 per square mile (18.3/km^{2}). The racial makeup of the township was 99.16% White, 0.09% African American, 0.09% Native American, 0.09% from other races, and 0.56% from two or more races. Hispanic or Latino of any race were 0.93% of the population.

There were 489 households, out of which 17.2% had children under the age of 18 living with them, 62.4% were married couples living together, 3.7% had a female householder with no husband present, and 30.9% were non-families. 28.2% of all households were made up of individuals, and 10.6% had someone living alone who was 65 years of age or older. The average household size was 2.20 and the average family size was 2.64.

In the township the population was spread out, with 16.5% under the age of 18, 6.7% from 18 to 24, 19.8% from 25 to 44, 31.4% from 45 to 64, and 25.6% who were 65 years of age or older. The median age was 50 years. For every 100 females, there were 108.9 males. For every 100 females age 18 and over, there were 107.6 males.

The median income for a household in the township was $41,250, and the median income for a family was $45,956. Males had a median income of $34,191 versus $24,821 for females. The per capita income for the township was $20,995. About 6.0% of families and 8.6% of the population were below the poverty line, including 11.2% of those under age 18 and 3.8% of those age 65 or over.

With the additional area of the sparsely populated former Rail Prairie Township, the overall population density dropped dramatically to 17.16 inhabitants per square mile (6.63 / km^{2}) in the 2010 census.
