= Antler Township, Bottineau County, North Dakota =

Civil township in North Dakota, U.S.

Antler Township
- Township
- Location of Antler Township in Bottineau County, North Dakota
- Coordinates: 48°56′47″N 101°18′00″W
- Country: United States
- State: North Dakota
- County: Bottineau

Area
  - Total: 43.8 sq mi (113.4 km^{2})
  - Land: 43.6 sq mi (112.9 km^{2})
  - Water: 0.019 sq mi (0.05 km^{2})

Population (2020)
  - Total: 68
  - Density: 1.6/sq mi (0.60/km^{2})
- Time zone: UTC-6 (Central (CST))
  - Summer (DST): UTC-5 (CDT)

Antler Township is a civil township in Bottineau County in the U.S. state of North Dakota. As of the 2000 census, its population was 78. It is the only township in North Dakota to border both Saskatchewan and Manitoba.
