= Henry P. Caulfield Jr. =

American political scientist

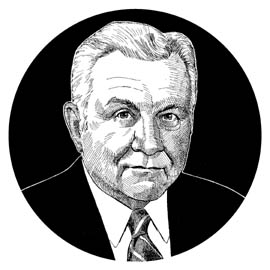
- Born: November 25, 1915; New York City
- Died: June 11, 2002 (aged 86); Fort Collins, Colorado
- Occupation: Professor
- Known for: First Director of U.S. Water Resources Council

Henry P. Caulfield Jr. (November 25, 1915 – June 11, 2002) was an American political scientist who had a long and distinguished career in public service with the U.S. Department of the Interior, culminating as the first director of its U.S. Water Resources Council, before becoming professor of political science at Colorado State University. He served on many boards and advisory committees and as a consultant to water resources agencies worldwide, and received awards for his service. Caulfield was born in New York City, and died in Fort Collins, Colorado, where he retired in 1986.

== Early life ==
Caulfield grew up with his parents, Henry P. Caulfield and Grace Nelson Caulfield, along with his brother Edward Nelson Caulfield, in Hollywood, California, graduating from Hollywood High School in 1931. He attended the California Institute of Technology, Lingnan University, Canton, China, and Oxford University, England, before earning his undergraduate degree at Harvard College in government and economics in 1940, an MPA degree from Harvard University's Littauer School of Public Administration (now the John F. Kennedy School of Government) in 1949 and completing his comprehensive examination for the Ph.D. in political economy and government there in 1950. He began his public service career as an economist with the Works Projects Administration (1940–41) before serving in the U.S. Navy, where he was assigned to the Office of the Secretary (1942–45) and received a Commendation Award from the Secretary of the Navy, eventually retiring as lieutenant commander. He served briefly as executive assistant to the director, White House Office of War Mobilization and Reconversion in 1946, before being named assistant for international affairs to the assistant director for statistical standards of the U.S. Bureau of the Budget (1946–48), predecessor of the current Office of Management and Budget. Caulfield married Violet M. Green in April 1956, with whom he had four children.

== Public service ==
Best known for his work on water resources policy, Caulfield was a member of the program staff, Office of the Secretary, U.S. Department of the Interior (1951–55), and research associate on energy policy at Resources for the Future, Inc. (1955–61). He returned to the Department of the Interior in February 1961 as assistant director and then director of the Resources Program Staff, Office of the Secretary, and served as first director of the U.S. Water Resources Council from April 1966 to August 1969.

Caulfield was chairman of the committee that drafted the policies, standards and procedures for water resources planning that became known as Senate Document 97, subjecting new federal water projects to benefit/cost analysis for the first time. He was the staff leader in drafting the Water Resources Planning Act of 1965 and was instrumental in its passage through the U.S. Congress; becoming the first director of the Water Resources Council, a cabinet-level interagency advisory committee created by that Act. From October 1961 to August 1969, he was the leading professional official within the United States government developing and implementing policies for comprehensive river basin planning. In 1968 he drafted and gained political acceptance of a Water Resources Councils' regulation changing the discount rate used in planning water projects from a formula based on the coupon rate of government bonds to one based on the yield rate—a substantial and important policy change. He also had a leading role in early development of the Water Resources Council's Principles and Standards for water project planning promulgated in September 1973.

Caulfield participated in drafting and securing passage by the U.S. Congress of important environmental legislation: the Land and Water Conservation Fund Act of 1964, the Federal Water Research Act of 1964, the Federal Water Projects Recreation Act of 1965, the Delaware Watergap National Recreation Act of 1966, the Clean Rivers Restoration Act of 1966, and the Wild and Scenic Rivers Act of 1968. Observing a time-honored tradition among top Washington bureaucrats, Caulfield is widely recognized as the anonymous author of an article published during his employment in the U.S. Department of the Interior and attributed to "Mr. Z," which proposed consolidation of natural resources and conservation functions of the national government (e.g., U.S. Forest Service, National Park Service, Corps of Engineers, and others) into a single cabinet-level Department of Natural Resources. He was one of a few political appointees who, at the end of the Johnson Administration, declined to automatically submit his resignation, apparently feeling it was a mark of distinction to be fired by President Nixon.

Caulfield was a member of the water board of the City of Fort Collins, Colorado (1974–88), and its vice president (1984–88). In this capacity he played a leading role in development of the city's policies with respect to water rights, treatment capacity, water meters and rates, wastewater treatment, environmental impacts and drought.

== Professor ==
From 1969 to 1986 Caulfield was professor of political science at Colorado State University, where with Phillip O. Foss and Norman I. Wengert he helped establish its doctoral program in environmental politics and policy, and on his retirement, was emeritus professor. One of his principal graduate courses was the Politics of Water Resources Planning and Management. During his career, Caufield was invited to lecture during visiting academic appointments on the faculties of many universities, including:

- University of Washington
- University of Massachusetts
- University of California, Davis
- Duke University
- Virginia Polytechnic and State University
- University of North Carolina
- University of Wisconsin
- University of Georgia

Caulfield also lectured during shorter appointments at some 30 institutions within the U.S. and overseas, including:

- Institute of Water Resources, Army Corps of Engineers, Fort Belvoir, Virginia
- University of Sarajevo, Yugoslavia
- University of Alberta, Canada
- Western Executive Training Center, U.S. Office of Personnel Management
- Zhongshan University, People's Republic of China
- East China Technical University of Water Resources
- Yangtze River Planning Office, Ministry of Water Conservancy and Electric Power
- Water Conservancy and Hydroelectric Power Research Institute, Academy of Sciences
- Japan Institute of Energy Law
- Yamanashi University, Japan
- Economic Research Institute, Kyoto University, Japan

== Advisory committees and consultancies ==
Indicative of the extent of his national and international reputation, Caulfield served on many advisory committees, including those of the National Academy of Science and the National Science Foundation. For many years he was a delegate to the Universities Council on Water Resources; a member of its executive board (1978–81); and its president (1979–80). Caulfield served as a consultant to many organizations, including the United Nations Panel of Experts on Water Resources Development Policies, (1970–73); the International Bank for Reconstruction and Development (1973); Colorado Department of Natural Resources (1976–78); U.S. Water Resources Council (1976, 1978, 1979, 1980); U.S. Agency for International Development, African Bureau, Department of State (1978); The Conservation Foundation (1978); International Training Center for Water Resources, Sofia Antipolis, Valbonne, France (1978); Upper Mississippi River Basin Commission (1979); Great Lakes Basin Commission (1981); Western Governor's Policy Office (1982, 1987); U.S. Council on Environmental Quality, (1984); U.S. Geological Survey (1986); and the Pennsylvania Department of Environmental Resources (1987).

== Awards ==
Caulfield received a Citation for Distinguished Service from Secretary of the Interior Stuart Udall in 1968 during the administration of President John F. Kennedy which said in part:

Since the start of his Government service in 1940, Mr. Caulfield has steadily demonstrated qualities of the exceptionally able public servant. He is a person of unfailing high standards of integrity, loyalty and devotion to public service. His quiet but persistent powers of persuasion and his ability to resolve complex resources problems have characterized his career as an effective advisor.

He also received the Iban Award in 1975 from the American Water Resources Association (AWRA), a national organization of over 2800 members, for promotion of multidisciplinary approaches to water resource problems.

== Henry P. Caulfield Medal ==
Annually since 1988 AWRA has awarded its Henry P. Caulfield Jr. Medal for Contributions to National Water Policy to an individual who has achieved a status of eminence in shaping national water policy. On presentation of the first medal to Caulfield in 1988, AWRA President Raymond Herrmann stated that "this medal was established to honor an individual whose record of achievements and contributions in setting, designing, and implementing water resources policies at the national level have been extraordinary."

Recipients of the medal are:

- Henry P. Caulfield Jr. – 1988
- Gilbert E. White – 1989
- Theodore M. Schad – 1990
- Luna B. Leopold – 1991
- R. Frank Gregg – 1992
- Leonard B. Dworsky – 1994
- Warren "Bud" Viessman Jr. – 1996
- Leo M. Eisel – 2004
- Richard A. Engberg – 2007

== Scholarly and professional writing ==
Caulfield was the author or coauthor of over 60 scholarly journal articles, chapters in books, and papers published in proceedings, in addition to numerous other papers, addresses, testimony before Congressional committees, U.S. government publications, and anonymous articles related to policy matters.

=== Selected publications ===
- "Welfare, economics, and resources development." In Land, Water Planning for Economic Growth. Boulder: University of Colorado Press, 1961.
- "Municipal water in federal programs." In Water: Development, Utilization, Conservation. Boulder: University of Colorado Press, 1963.
- "Urban waterfront redevelopment." In Beauty for America. Proceedings of the White House Conference on Natural Beauty. Washington, D.C.: U.S. Government Printing Office 1965.
- "Partnership in comprehensive river basin planning." Journal of the American Water Works Association 59(October): Part I, 1967.
- "Environmental management: Water and related land. Public Administration Review 28( July–August), 1968.
- "Planning the earth's surface." In No Deposit-No Return, Huey D. Johnson, ed. Reading, MA: Addison-Wesley, 1970.
- "The concilar approach to organization for water resources planning and action within a federal system of government. In Proceedings of the interregional seminar on water resources administration, New Delhi, India, 22 January-2 February 1973, 113–119. New York: United Nations, 1975.
- "Policy goals and values in historical perspective." In Values and choices in the development of the Colorado River basin, Dean F. Peterson and A. Barry Crawford, eds. Tucson: University of Arizona Press, 1976.
- "Water resources management in river basin planning and development in the United States. In Towards a rational policy in river basin development in the Sahel. Washington, D.C.: U.S Agency for International Development, 1976.
- "Establishing federal-state-local goals for water resource programs and projects." In Financing water resources: Cost allocation, cost sharing and incentives, R.M. North and S.H. Hanke, eds. Atlanta: University of Georgia, 1982.
- "U.S. water resources development policy and intergovernmental relations." In Western public lands: The management of natural resources in a time of declining federalism, John G. Francis and Richard Ganzel, eds. Totowa, NJ: Rowman & Allenheld, 1984.
- "Strategies for maintaining agricultural viability with limited water supplies." In Water scarcity: Impacts on western agriculture, Ernest A. Engelbert and Ann F. Scheuring, eds. Berkeley: University of California Press, 1984.
- "Comments from a political science perspective." In Social and environmental objectives in water resources planning and management, 137-41. W. Wiessman and K.E. Schilling, eds. New York: American Society of Civil Engineers, 1986.
- "The conservation and environmental movements: An historical analysis." In Environmental politics and policy: Theories and evidence, 2d ed., James Lester, ed. Durham, NC: Duke University Press, 1989.
