= Maxbass, North Dakota =

Maxbass
- City
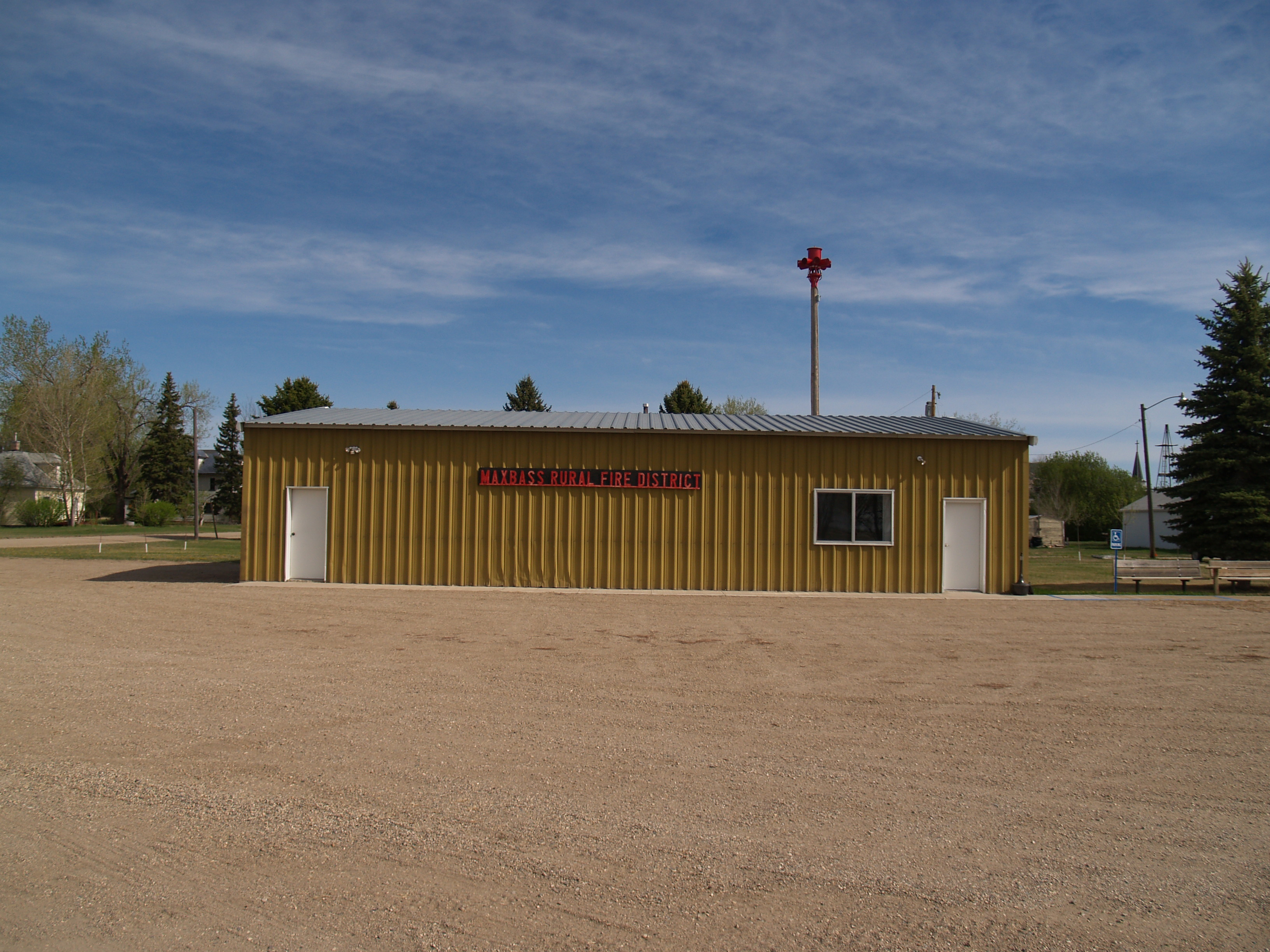
- Maxbass Rural Fire District

- Location of Maxbass, North Dakota
- Coordinates: 48°43′21″N 101°08′33″W
- Country: United States
- State: North Dakota
- County: Bottineau
- Founded: 1905

Area
  - Total: 0.16 sq mi (0.42 km^{2})
  - Land: 0.16 sq mi (0.42 km^{2})
  - Water: 0 sq mi (0.00 km^{2})
- Elevation: 1,506 ft (459 m)

Population (2020)
  - Total: 89
  - Estimate (2022): 87
  - Density: 544.6/sq mi (210.27/km^{2})
- Time zone: UTC-6 (Central (CST))
  - Summer (DST): UTC-5 (CDT)
- ZIP code: 58760
- Area code: 701
- FIPS code: 38-51420
- GNIS feature ID: 1036154

Maxbass is a city in Bottineau County, North Dakota, United States. The population was 89 at the 2020 census. Maxbass was founded in 1905.

== History ==
The city was named after Max Bass who figured prominently in the Great Northern Railway's immigration and land settlement activities for many years before and after 1900. Bass was born in Austria in 1853 and served as land commissioner Dakota Territory from 1885 to 1901. In March 1891, he was appointed General Immigration Agent for the Great Northern Railway with headquarters in Chicago and remained with the railroad until his death in 1909.

== Geography ==
According to the United States Census Bureau, the city has a total area of 0.17 square miles (0.44 km^{2}), all land.

== Demographics ==
Historical population
Census	Pop.	Note	%±
1910	240		—
1920	147		−38.7%
1930	217		47.6%
1940	215		−0.9%
1950	259		20.5%
1960	218		−15.8%
1970	174		−20.2%
1980	141		−19.0%
1990	123		−12.8%
2000	91		−26.0%
2010	84		−7.7%
2020	89		6.0%
2022 (est.)	87		−2.2%
U.S. Decennial Census; 2020 Census

=== 2010 census ===
As of the census of 2010, there were 84 people, 43 households, and 20 families living in the city. The population density was 494.1 inhabitants per square mile (190.8/km^{2}). There were 61 housing units at an average density of 358.8 per square mile (138.5/km^{2}). The racial makeup of the city was 89.3% White, 1.2% Native American, 1.2% from other races, and 8.3% from two or more races. Hispanic or Latino of any race were 1.2% of the population.

There were 43 households, of which 18.6% had children under the age of 18 living with them, 32.6% were married couples living together, 11.6% had a female householder with no husband present, 2.3% had a male householder with no wife present, and 53.5% were non-families. 46.5% of all households were made up of individuals, and 18.6% had someone living alone who was 65 years of age or older. The average household size was 1.95 and the average family size was 2.70.

The median age in the city was 41 years. 20.2% of residents were under the age of 18; 8.4% were between the ages of 18 and 24; 27.3% were from 25 to 44; 28.6% were from 45 to 64; and 15.5% were 65 years of age or older. The gender makeup of the city was 59.5% male and 40.5% female.

=== 2000 census ===
As of the census of 2000, there were 91 people, 45 households, and 25 families living in the city. The population density was 554.2 inhabitants per square mile (214.0/km^{2}). There were 70 housing units at an average density of 426.3 per square mile (164.6/km^{2}). The racial makeup of the city was 96.70% White and 3.30% Native American.

There were 45 households, out of which 17.8% had children under the age of 18 living with them, 46.7% were married couples living together, 2.2% had a female householder with no husband present, and 44.4% were non-families. 42.2% of all households were made up of individuals, and 22.2% had someone living alone who was 65 years of age or older. The average household size was 2.02 and the average family size was 2.76.

In the city, the population was spread out, with 20.9% under the age of 18, 5.5% from 18 to 24, 26.4% from 25 to 44, 26.4% from 45 to 64, and 20.9% who were 65 years of age or older. The median age was 44 years. For every 100 females, there were 97.8 males. For every 100 females age 18 and over, there were 100.0 males.

The median income for a household in the city was $36,250, and the median income for a family was $37,500. Males had a median income of $23,750 versus $22,083 for females. The per capita income for the city was $22,129. There were no families and 2.4% of the population living below the poverty line, including no under eighteens and 9.5% of those over 64.
