= List of townships in North Dakota =

North Dakota townships
- Map of the 1,314 townships in North Dakota
- Category: Lower-level administrative division
- Location: North Dakota
- Created: 1889
- Number: 1,314
- Populations: 0 (Harper Township) – 4,293 (Hay Creek Township)
- Areas: 0.1 square miles (0.26 km^{2}) (Fargo Township) – 143.9 square miles (373 km^{2}) (Sentinel Township)
- Government: Township government

This is a full list of townships in North Dakota, based on United States Geological Survey and U.S. Census data as of 2010.

Township	County	Pop. (2010)	Land (sq mi)	Water (sq mi)	Latitude	Longitude	GEO ID	ANSI code
Abercrombie	Richland	268	60.766	0.000	46.410346	-96.797221	3807700140	01036846
Acme	Hettinger	25	36.008	0.012	46.506679	-102.353594	3804100220	01759444
Acton	Walsh	96	37.641	0.431	48.419342	-97.201472	3809900260	01036533
Ada	Dickey	51	35.984	0.000	45.979557	-98.319145	3802100300	01036744
Adams	Walsh	46	34.335	0.680	48.409322	-98.128101	3809900380	01036541
Addie	Griggs	64	33.268	2.309	47.537109	-98.299123	3803900420	01036653
Addison	Cass	91	35.973	0.000	46.760220	-97.115881	3801700500	01036362
Adelaide	Bowman	29	35.671	0.033	46.162682	-103.677343	3801100540	01759307
Adler	Nelson	30	35.840	0.138	47.888030	-97.944722	3806300580	01036567
Adrian	LaMoure	99	35.975	0.005	46.594594	-98.588988	3804500660	01036914
Advance	Pembina	130	35.874	0.019	48.833775	-97.753243	3806700700	01036731
Afton	Ward	609	35.492	0.162	48.149080	-101.333926	3810100740	01036992
Agnes	Grand Forks	72	36.121	0.000	48.064318	-97.708993	3803500820	01036620
Akra	Pembina	229	35.562	0.379	48.754849	-97.761760	3806700900	01036730
Albert	Benson	51	35.572	0.339	48.057399	-99.513270	3800500980	01759234
Albertha	Dickey	23	33.664	2.319	45.982136	-98.921823	3802101020	01036750
Albion	Dickey	42	36.057	0.114	46.076421	-98.677368	3802101060	01036760
Alex	McKenzie	58	34.453	0.036	47.800621	-103.594323	3805301140	01036966
Alexander	Pierce	28	35.155	0.726	47.988001	-99.865038	3806901320	01759551
Alexander	Stutsman	26	35.613	0.291	46.668117	-98.998707	3809301260	01036447
Alexandria	Divide	14	35.743	0.355	48.757146	-103.651370	3802301300	01036918
Alger	Mountrail	36	35.388	0.461	48.236797	-102.493519	3806101380	01037044
Aliceton	Ransom	121	36.110	0.123	46.318834	-97.584913	3807301460	01036861
Alleghany	Ransom	55	36.096	0.019	46.318862	-97.836064	3807301540	01036863
Allen	Kidder	55	34.186	1.099	46.914669	-99.883150	3804301580	01759465
Allendale	Grand Forks	470	35.916	0.040	47.809731	-97.185485	3803501620	01036594
Alma	Cavalier	30	35.672	0.092	48.674068	-98.121986	3801901660	01759349
Alta	Barnes	108	36.186	0.010	46.935364	-97.872897	3800301780	01036419
Ambrose	Divide	17	41.657	0.704	48.945073	-103.541879	3802301900	01036929
Amenia	Cass	105	34.621	0.008	47.026475	-97.270723	3801701980	01036385
Americus	Grand Forks	159	36.006	0.029	47.722861	-97.034747	3803502020	01036585
Amity	Bottineau	33	35.998	0.097	48.760912	-100.375861	3800902100	01759265
Amor	Bowman	16	35.848	0.030	46.076432	-103.555048	3801102140	01759308
Amundsville	McLean	39	35.919	0.092	47.799740	-101.926543	3805502180	01759524
Anamoose	McHenry	64	35.066	0.405	47.894492	-100.270178	3804902260	02397764
Anderson	Barnes	52	35.807	0.348	47.037519	-98.266211	3800302300	01036431
Andrews	McLean	49	35.782	0.011	47.797481	-101.035933	3805502340	01759525
Anna	Ward	29	35.117	1.311	47.985372	-101.668468	3810102420	01037001
Antelope	Richland	110	36.018	0.000	46.325777	-96.966877	3807702540	01036841
Antelope Creek	McKenzie	15	35.946	0.037	47.710768	-103.594054	3805302600	01036965
Antelope Lake	Pierce	30	31.743	4.426	47.985031	-100.122933	3806902620	01759552
Antler	Bottineau	56	43.559	0.021	48.951314	-101.289149	3800902700	02397766
Apple Creek	Burleigh	2,652	34.854	0.047	46.749623	-100.633910	3801502780	01759333
Ardoch	Walsh	69	34.023	1.426	48.242266	-97.319417	3809902900	01036516
Armourdale	Towner	46	35.734	0.322	48.847398	-99.320599	3809503100	01759646
Arne	Benson	42	35.377	0.517	47.885879	-99.610605	3800503180	01759235
Arnegard	McKenzie	65	35.580	0.055	47.800928	-103.486944	3805303260	01036964
Arthur	Cass	78	34.538	0.000	47.108196	-97.262596	3801703340	01036386
Arvilla	Grand Forks	338	35.845	0.000	47.889150	-97.559013	3803503420	01036609
Ashby	Hettinger	4	32.175	0.000	46.244718	-102.434700	3804103460	01037212
Ashland	Stutsman	64	33.971	1.444	47.112057	-98.649939	3809303500	01036482
Ashtabula	Barnes	112	32.773	3.409	47.114263	-98.014475	3800303580	01036428
Athens	Williams	22	35.867	0.131	48.403975	-103.609456	3810503620	01759719
Atkins	Towner	35	35.106	0.955	48.429927	-99.304793	3809503660	01759647
Atwood	Kidder	21	33.490	2.037	47.215299	-99.928410	3804303700	01759466
Aurena	McLean	20	35.599	0.442	47.718056	-100.789441	3805503820	01759526
Aurora	Benson	32	35.804	0.223	47.984438	-99.357392	3800503860	01759236
Austin	Mountrail	37	35.668	0.171	48.149578	-102.233281	3806103900	01033995
Avon	Grand Forks	78	35.874	0.000	47.802204	-97.559246	3803503940	01036597
Ayr	Cass	72	36.021	0.000	47.021577	-97.515245	3801704060	01036389
Baden	Ward	35	34.753	0.940	48.588295	-102.048091	3810104140	01759673
Badger	LaMoure	52	35.789	0.305	46.319180	-98.463236	3804504180	01036889
Baer	Hettinger	26	32.258	0.085	46.241797	-102.054774	3804104220	01037238
Baker	Kidder	39	39.296	0.639	46.683058	-100.008913	3804304300	01759467
Baldwin	Barnes	33	35.480	0.776	47.200318	-97.892007	3800304340	01036436
Bale	Ransom	83	35.995	0.020	46.318753	-97.710796	3807304420	01036862
Balfour	McHenry	38	35.017	0.670	47.965278	-100.510672	3804904500	02397769
Ball Hill	Griggs	55	36.494	0.000	47.370002	-98.178896	3803904540	01036633
Balta	Pierce	20	33.954	1.729	48.145945	-100.030308	3806904620	02397770
Banner	Cavalier	29	29.072	0.829	48.580184	-98.785942	3801904660	01759350
Banner	Mountrail	34	35.789	0.032	47.883851	-102.054248	3806104700	01037017
Bantry	McHenry	36	35.700	0.086	48.509058	-100.592261	3804904780	02397771
Barnes	Cass	25	0.966	0.026	46.868649	-96.923421	3801704900	01036359
Barney	Richland	134	35.382	0.000	46.239252	-96.947979	3807704980	01036831
Barr Butte	Williams	11	35.684	0.127	48.583109	-103.852639	3810505020	01036922
Barrie	Richland	191	35.180	0.004	46.586143	-97.103449	3807705060	01036855
Bartlett	Ramsey	71	34.693	1.305	48.064990	-98.486913	3807105140	01759565
Bartley	Griggs	25	34.319	0.559	47.282086	-98.278087	3803905180	01036635
Bathgate	Pembina	72	26.515	0.000	48.858375	-97.491010	3806705300	01036727
Battleview	Burke	80	35.585	0.290	48.595501	-102.824470	3801305380	01037111
Beach	Golden Valley	157	104.911	0.097	46.892458	-103.954824	3803305460	01037079
Bear Creek	Dickey	183	30.007	0.105	46.156543	-98.054236	3802105500	01036764
Beaulieu	Pembina	155	35.955	0.081	48.754743	-97.893444	3806705580	01036733
Beaver	Benson	25	32.926	2.865	48.239213	-99.520142	3800505620	01759237
Beaver Creek	Steele	77	34.703	0.921	47.623288	-97.654565	3809105660	01036672
Beery	Hettinger	30	35.256	0.201	46.413697	-102.226445	3804105680	01759446
Beisigl	Adams	22	36.043	0.012	46.159684	-102.098148	3800105700	01759233
Belford	Richland	122	35.679	0.000	46.152958	-96.948315	3807705860	01036830
Bell	Cass	36	35.914	0.000	47.195265	-97.133704	3801705900	01036395
Belmont	Traill	76	25.009	0.000	47.622701	-96.915850	3809705940	01036699
Bentinck	Bottineau	25	35.708	0.248	48.850490	-101.168188	3800906020	01759266
Bentru	Grand Forks	77	17.599	0.130	47.708392	-96.948699	3803506100	01036584
Bergen	Nelson	39	35.321	0.576	47.708551	-98.322508	3806306220	01036560
Berlin	Cass	124	34.192	0.000	47.019309	-97.009609	3801706260	01036381
Berlin	Sheridan	42	34.492	1.557	47.709864	-100.123218	3808306340	01759629
Berlin	Wells	28	34.775	1.265	47.367093	-99.575078	3810306380	01037127
Berthold	Ward	76	35.862	0.272	48.330945	-101.717380	3810106500	01036946
Berwick	McHenry	57	36.078	0.246	48.333649	-100.291468	3804906580	01759483
Bethel	Towner	32	35.674	0.276	48.508175	-99.025178	3809506620	01759648
Bicker	Mountrail	36	35.789	0.131	48.510155	-102.801739	3806106700	01037199
Big Bend	Mountrail	33	31.422	5.114	47.883827	-102.583709	3806106800	01759550
Big Bend	Ransom	153	36.255	0.103	46.405746	-97.605490	3807306820	01036869
Big Meadow	Williams	27	34.888	1.005	48.583015	-103.101268	3810506860	01037009
Big Stone	Williams	31	35.712	0.158	48.582670	-103.331141	3810506900	01759720
Billings	Cavalier	13	28.209	0.269	48.579395	-98.517994	3801906940	01759351
Bilodeau	Wells	41	35.573	0.212	47.454060	-99.319948	3810306980	01759697
Bingham	Traill	70	30.044	0.048	47.541156	-96.912555	3809707060	01036698
Binghampton	Barnes	76	35.538	0.085	46.760700	-97.744686	3800307100	01036406
Birtsell	Foster	97	35.749	0.126	47.537051	-99.191835	3803107140	01759418
Bjornson	McHenry	42	35.393	0.279	47.896062	-100.894818	3804907300	01759484
Black Butte	Hettinger	41	35.795	0.000	46.499943	-102.613520	3804107380	01759447
Black Loam	LaMoure	44	35.959	0.067	46.493084	-98.107170	3804507420	01036895
Blacktail	Williams	62	35.833	0.237	48.414394	-103.730302	3810507460	01759721
Blackwater	McLean	27	35.344	0.122	47.628974	-101.751285	3805507500	01759527
Blaine	Bottineau	26	35.889	0.023	48.683439	-101.375325	3800907540	01759267
Blanchard	Traill	87	36.012	0.000	47.367463	-97.282684	3809707660	01036685
Bloom	Stutsman	554	33.776	0.573	46.942845	-98.618900	3809307740	01036469
Bloomenfield	Stutsman	34	34.280	1.742	46.747452	-99.279759	3809307780	01036463
Bloomfield	Traill	130	36.059	0.000	47.367479	-97.155083	3809707820	01036682
Blooming	Grand Forks	295	34.525	0.329	47.972550	-97.297617	3803507860	01036605
Blooming Prairie	Divide	50	42.168	1.102	48.945295	-103.395531	3802307900	01036928
Blooming Valley	Divide	47	35.564	0.528	48.851356	-103.135611	3802307940	01759387
Blue Butte	McKenzie	79	34.495	1.183	47.886549	-102.953006	3805308020	01036961
Blue Hill	McLean	16	35.876	0.079	47.790088	-101.669787	3805508060	01759528
Blue Ridge	Williams	35	33.932	2.121	48.585864	-103.590163	3810508100	01037004
Bluebird	LaMoure	35	35.572	0.060	46.499580	-98.848322	3804507980	01036907
Bohnsack	Traill	55	35.057	0.000	47.281305	-97.133710	3809708140	01036681
Bonetraill	Williams	17	36.007	0.000	48.416393	-103.863340	3810508260	01759722
Boone	Sheridan	16	35.267	0.650	47.544779	-100.086317	3808308300	01037149
Border	Divide	22	35.219	0.818	48.756709	-102.994599	3802308340	01037008
Bordulac	Foster	75	34.028	1.876	47.362981	-98.936408	3803108420	01759419
Bowbells	Burke	42	35.114	0.350	48.756547	-102.207137	3801308540	02397777
Bowen	Sargent	67	35.712	0.000	46.153253	-97.695296	3808108620	01036806
Bowman	Bowman	257	34.235	0.081	46.155936	-103.444271	3801108740	01037225
Boyd	Burleigh	134	35.992	0.000	46.765077	-100.520928	3801508780	01759334
Boyesen	Bowman	23	35.820	0.109	46.079836	-103.304148	3801108820	01037227
Brampton	Sargent	59	36.381	0.053	45.986341	-97.830964	3808108980	01036788
Brandenburg	Richland	102	35.249	0.000	46.152860	-96.824503	3807709020	01036828
Brander	Bottineau	54	35.726	0.265	48.755867	-101.026977	3800909060	01759268
Brandon	Renville	72	34.743	0.130	48.747978	-101.570983	3807509100	01759599
Bremen	Wells	47	35.825	0.238	47.709329	-99.350957	3810309260	01759696
Brenna	Grand Forks	725	35.983	0.027	47.888770	-97.171507	3803509300	01036602
Brightwood	Richland	203	32.696	1.977	46.069255	-96.936548	3807709340	01036821
Brillian	Ward	57	36.200	0.012	47.980022	-101.034374	3810109380	01759674
Brimer	Barnes	59	35.524	0.452	47.015788	-98.393490	3800309420	01036433
Brittian	Hettinger	17	35.700	0.077	46.303491	-102.218605	3804109580	01759448
Broadlawn	Steele	41	35.250	0.062	47.279320	-97.508269	3809109620	01036657
Broadview	Griggs	38	33.916	1.469	47.281208	-98.012284	3803909660	01036629
Broe	Benson	35	35.497	0.546	48.146770	-99.641921	3800509740	01759238
Brookbank	Mountrail	34	35.908	0.012	48.158814	-102.500392	3806109780	01037114
Brooklyn	Williams	27	35.622	0.007	48.233917	-103.270596	3810509820	01037022
Brown	McHenry	80	35.217	0.206	47.980892	-100.896087	3804909860	01759485
Bruce	Cavalier	17	35.304	0.796	48.768683	-98.918404	3801909900	01759352
Bryan	Griggs	39	35.946	0.021	47.536605	-98.425381	3803909940	01036655
Bucephalia	Foster	43	35.428	0.659	47.377046	-98.824726	3803110020	01759420
Buchanan	Stutsman	99	33.901	1.971	47.014694	-98.775046	3809310100	01036483
Buckeye	Kidder	30	32.527	3.355	47.030261	-99.647098	3804310180	01037189
Bucklin	Slope	19	32.167	0.037	46.348091	-103.983039	3808710220	01037203
Bucyrus	Adams	27	35.579	0.000	46.075576	-102.808847	3800110340	01037244
Buena Vista	Bowman	21	30.565	0.000	46.242991	-103.057674	3801110380	01037257
Buffalo	Cass	82	35.896	0.047	46.938460	-97.481862	3801710460	01036377
Buford	Williams	74	33.795	1.681	48.003781	-103.920550	3810510540	01759723
Bull Butte	Williams	13	51.324	0.101	48.335541	-103.960814	3810510620	01759724
Bull Moose	Wells	34	33.509	2.140	47.462696	-99.962955	3810310700	01037154
Bullion	Golden Valley	28	35.863	0.019	46.678238	-103.769006	3803310660	01037076
Bunker	Kidder	22	36.008	0.064	46.673341	-99.764095	3804310740	01037060
Burg	Divide	24	35.629	0.464	48.767137	-103.518331	3802310780	01036925
Burke	Mountrail	39	35.543	0.181	48.240127	-102.245896	3806110860	01037021
Burlington	Ward	388	35.307	0.060	48.238448	-101.464843	3810110980	01036986
Burt	Ward	102	35.695	0.423	48.160483	-101.458160	3810111100	01037049
Bush	Eddy	40	35.504	0.698	47.803541	-98.975206	3802711140	01759399
Butte	McLean	13	35.660	0.371	47.808401	-100.789051	3805511220	02406943
Butte Valley	Benson	55	35.310	0.643	48.144251	-99.513260	3800511260	01759239
Buxton	Traill	107	35.108	0.000	47.628339	-97.155910	3809711380	01036704
Byersville	McLean	11	34.811	1.250	47.731660	-100.638829	3805511420	01759529
Byron	Cavalier	27	44.436	0.533	48.934555	-98.780896	3801911460	01759353
Caledonia	Traill	111	29.539	0.000	47.454423	-96.911195	3809711540	01036689
Callahan	Renville	28	31.521	4.136	48.586092	-101.658319	3807511620	01759600
Cameron	Ward	33	34.597	0.926	47.897422	-101.538371	3810111740	01036956
Campbell	Emmons	65	34.824	1.920	46.596112	-99.989252	3802911780	01037064
Campbell	Hettinger	29	35.131	0.021	46.582196	-102.350268	3804111820	01759449
Cando	Towner	81	35.124	0.404	48.511829	-99.156026	3809511900	02397779
Canfield	Burleigh	11	35.506	0.435	47.179850	-100.398544	3801511940	01037143
Cannon Ball	Hettinger	45	35.990	0.000	46.326983	-102.109898	3804111980	01759450
Captain's Landing	Morton	120	0.314	0.119	46.813784	-100.830487	3805912080	01759547
Carbondale	Ward	47	35.507	0.013	48.500813	-101.910874	3810112100	01033987
Carlisle	Pembina	100	71.662	0.000	48.804129	-97.359806	3806712180	01036724
Carpenter	Steele	51	35.021	0.000	47.282384	-97.770542	3809112220	01036661
Carpio	Ward	68	35.751	0.000	48.415611	-101.778440	3810112300	01036945
Carrington	Foster	205	34.043	0.339	47.464541	-99.063994	3803112380	02397780
Carroll	Slope	10	35.994	0.000	46.411232	-102.988525	3808712420	01759639
Carter	Burke	13	35.117	0.802	48.856110	-102.340216	3801312500	01759317
Casey	Ransom	90	36.293	0.031	46.492998	-97.605198	3807312580	01036870
Cash	Slope	33	35.691	0.338	46.316272	-103.495329	3808712620	01037259
Casselton	Cass	78	33.869	0.000	46.935775	-97.242189	3801712740	01036375
Castle Rock	Hettinger	49	35.920	0.015	46.320235	-102.370512	3804112780	01759451
Cathay	Wells	56	35.645	0.098	47.540251	-99.459981	3810312860	02397782
Cato	Ramsey	17	35.640	0.518	48.321505	-98.608770	3807112900	01759566
Cavalier	Pembina	588	70.733	0.058	48.844563	-97.656753	3806712980	01036728
Cecil	Bottineau	16	35.252	0.156	48.667941	-100.221920	3800913060	01759269
Cedar	Adams	24	31.646	0.007	46.240608	-102.675823	3800113100	01037235
Cedar Creek	Slope	25	35.743	0.283	46.331604	-102.977577	3808713140	01759640
Center	Richland	465	44.416	0.000	46.236799	-96.682765	3807713220	01036826
Central	Nelson	29	34.825	1.173	47.896711	-98.204952	3806313260	01036570
Chain Lakes	Ramsey	12	25.655	11.123	48.350443	-99.131819	3807113380	01759567
Champion	Williams	16	35.869	0.120	48.410210	-103.222457	3810513460	01037032
Chandler	Adams	13	36.008	0.017	46.169489	-102.424599	3800113500	01037218
Charbon	McKenzie	35	35.777	0.061	47.892307	-103.728474	3805313540	01036971
Chaseley	Wells	38	35.156	0.815	47.464888	-99.830606	3810313740	01037183
Chatfield	Bottineau	44	35.882	0.059	48.588175	-101.121397	3800913780	01759270
Cherry Lake	Eddy	33	33.381	1.564	47.643166	-98.716308	3802713820	01759400
Chester	Grand Forks	122	36.152	0.000	47.889474	-97.430288	3803513860	01036607
Chestina	Kidder	25	35.727	0.257	47.031837	-100.029623	3804313900	01037254
Chicago	Stutsman	47	33.735	1.866	46.850885	-99.265662	3809313940	01036464
Chilton	Hettinger	34	36.196	0.042	46.331503	-102.495287	3804113980	01759452
Christiania	Burleigh	37	35.966	0.038	46.952550	-100.255074	3801514060	01759335
Clara	Nelson	21	34.634	1.393	48.144429	-98.357281	3806314180	01036583
Clark	Hettinger	31	35.508	0.016	46.585077	-102.730707	3804114220	01759453
Clay	Renville	39	35.861	0.052	48.678600	-101.514193	3807514260	01759601
Clayton	Burke	34	35.436	0.627	48.758149	-102.488825	3801314300	01037104
Clear Lake	Burleigh	36	35.906	0.195	46.944990	-100.130261	3801514380	01759336
Clear Lake	Kidder	37	34.510	1.036	47.111630	-99.904565	3804314420	01759468
Clearfield	Griggs	44	35.357	0.634	47.449530	-98.297626	3803914340	01036644
Clearwater	Mountrail	56	35.467	0.584	48.418137	-102.302775	3806114460	01037118
Cleary	Burke	37	35.296	0.677	48.685446	-102.669424	3801314500	01037098
Clement	Dickey	109	45.275	0.389	46.160869	-98.183598	3802114540	01036766
Clermont	Adams	35	35.887	0.039	45.989318	-102.436110	3800114620	01037213
Cleveland	Walsh	76	35.746	0.218	48.232226	-97.957111	3809914700	01036521
Clifton	Cass	75	35.140	0.222	46.753005	-97.629402	3801714780	01036370
Climax	Williams	11	32.873	0.030	48.501299	-103.985558	3810514860	01759725
Clinton	Divide	13	35.435	0.612	48.844449	-103.784244	3802314900	01036932
Coalfield	Divide	34	35.401	0.248	48.843465	-103.000181	3802315020	01759388
Coburn	Ransom	61	35.819	0.011	46.579580	-97.353186	3807315060	01036879
Colfax	Richland	241	59.112	0.000	46.500329	-96.926322	3807715220	01036848
Colgate	Steele	93	35.395	0.000	47.282200	-97.642311	3809115340	01036659
Colquhoun	Renville	63	43.170	0.009	48.944346	-101.704670	3807515380	01759602
Columbia	Eddy	34	34.934	0.125	47.623770	-98.809567	3802715420	01759401
Colville	Burke	65	33.259	1.365	48.591025	-102.693028	3801315500	01037097
Colvin	Eddy	60	35.526	0.556	47.715317	-98.601342	3802715540	01759402
Conklin	Stutsman	12	34.299	1.577	47.293550	-99.299185	3809315700	01037139
Connor	Slope	30	35.822	0.067	46.411545	-103.232889	3808715740	01759641
Coolin	Towner	39	35.869	0.175	48.413995	-99.025133	3809515860	01759649
Cooperstown	Griggs	56	35.450	0.304	47.459753	-98.180982	3803915940	01036643
Cordelia	Bottineau	96	34.601	1.146	48.851724	-100.238682	3800915980	01759271
Corinne	Stutsman	42	35.493	0.092	47.276592	-98.520416	3809316020	01036507
Cornell	Cass	59	36.104	0.000	47.021877	-97.642303	3801716100	01036391
Corwin	Stutsman	100	36.029	0.004	46.747140	-98.638320	3809316140	01036453
Cottonwood	Mountrail	32	33.669	2.318	48.427789	-102.527219	3806116220	01037101
Cottonwood Lake	McHenry	20	34.244	1.765	47.897434	-100.650867	3804916260	01759486
Coulee	Ramsey	65	35.293	0.216	48.235617	-99.126223	3807116340	01759568
Courtenay	Stutsman	36	35.235	0.257	47.189672	-98.530868	3809316420	01036497
Crane Creek	Mountrail	84	35.704	0.278	48.074507	-102.380242	3806116540	01037041
Crawford	Slope	31	35.892	0.051	46.320329	-103.729934	3808716620	01037166
Creel	Ramsey	1,305	14.578	15.621	48.075823	-98.857272	3807116660	01759569
Cremerville	McLean	27	35.739	0.054	47.811011	-102.054883	3805516700	01759530
Crocus	Towner	44	35.047	0.940	48.667289	-99.155787	3809516820	01759650
Crofte	Burleigh	199	36.163	0.000	47.026425	-100.685988	3801516860	01037131
Cromwell	Burleigh	35	36.208	0.000	47.026008	-100.558805	3801516900	01037133
Crowfoot	Mountrail	18	34.701	1.283	48.495946	-102.180433	3806116980	01037050
Crown Hill	Kidder	7	30.799	1.468	46.770977	-100.025924	3804317020	01759469
Crystal	Pembina	50	35.499	0.000	48.586423	-97.732145	3806717100	01036718
Crystal Lake	Wells	32	35.522	0.424	47.541346	-99.974737	3810317140	01037152
Crystal Springs	Kidder	32	35.415	0.636	46.848792	-99.529639	3804317220	01759470
Cuba	Barnes	76	35.709	0.032	46.851144	-97.860271	3800317300	01036409
Cusator	Stutsman	26	34.878	0.693	46.746853	-98.997611	3809317460	01036459
Cut Bank	Bottineau	37	35.898	0.033	48.763937	-101.430571	3800917540	01759272
Cypress	Cavalier	40	44.404	0.044	48.937547	-98.910000	3801917580	01759354
Dahlen	Nelson	68	35.710	0.247	48.148601	-97.957149	3806317660	01036580
Dale	Burke	27	35.469	0.609	48.852372	-102.476504	3801317740	01759318
Dalen	Bottineau	114	42.825	1.011	48.940294	-100.506570	3800917780	01759273
Daneville	Divide	34	50.602	1.307	48.764881	-103.946884	3802317940	01036926
Danton	Richland	135	35.060	0.000	46.238611	-97.072051	3807717980	01036835
Darling Springs	Adams	22	31.078	0.000	46.243789	-102.808942	3800118100	01037222
Dash	Towner	25	44.301	0.772	48.942696	-99.077031	3809518140	01759651
Davenport	Cass	144	35.918	0.000	46.672909	-97.115459	3801718220	01036353
Dayton	Nelson	70	34.510	0.345	47.796739	-98.449698	3806318300	01036566
Dazey	Barnes	51	35.005	0.385	47.206290	-98.140779	3800318380	01036438
De Groat	Ramsey	22	31.828	4.744	48.332637	-98.994748	3807118740	01759570
De Witt	Divide	18	41.210	1.086	48.953531	-103.787222	3802319500	01036934
Dean	LaMoure	224	34.347	0.432	46.318627	-98.349838	3804518420	01036888
Debing	Mountrail	44	35.630	0.306	48.233288	-102.623258	3806118460	01037100
Deep River	McHenry	48	36.058	0.091	48.596558	-100.852714	3804918540	01759487
Deepwater	McLean	20	36.051	0.000	47.717336	-101.936332	3805518580	01759531
Deer Lake	Stutsman	29	34.447	1.431	47.043867	-99.045496	3809318700	01036489
Deering	McHenry	107	35.951	0.087	48.407676	-100.983888	3804918660	02397790
Delger	Wells	26	35.769	0.214	47.551485	-99.850952	3810318860	01759698
Delhi	Golden Valley	29	35.854	0.048	47.015903	-103.846476	3803318900	01759432
Denbigh	McHenry	83	36.125	0.348	48.339749	-100.540741	3804919020	01759488
Denhoff	Sheridan	31	34.184	1.891	47.465016	-100.235313	3808319100	01037148
Denmark	Ward	91	33.734	2.172	48.763378	-102.086513	3810119140	01759675
Denver	Sargent	57	34.869	0.570	46.232752	-97.934403	3808119180	01036812
Des Lacs	Ward	85	35.097	0.277	48.231518	-101.608035	3810119340	01036949
Devillo	Richland	84	35.977	0.000	46.065783	-96.700238	3807719380	01036818
Dewey	Walsh	38	35.609	0.455	48.420151	-98.264085	3809919460	01036542
Dexter	Richland	67	35.009	0.823	46.144479	-97.177094	3807719540	01036836
Dimond	Burke	17	32.826	2.876	48.698601	-102.416307	3801319660	01759319
Divide	Dickey	79	35.125	0.232	46.235844	-98.064163	3802119700	01036765
Dodds	Nelson	44	35.927	0.404	47.990879	-98.322307	3806319780	01036573
Dogden	McLean	46	35.346	0.406	47.803581	-100.645185	3805519860	01759532
Douglas	McLean	35	35.717	0.253	47.801739	-101.546210	3805519980	01036982
Dover	Griggs	46	35.193	0.155	47.276868	-98.393744	3803920060	01036637
Dows	Cass	43	36.011	0.000	47.195414	-97.387703	3801720220	01036397
Drayton	Pembina	29	34.876	0.442	48.593176	-97.222979	3806720380	01036710
Dresden	Cavalier	41	43.868	0.827	48.942364	-98.529750	3801920460	01759355
Driscoll	Burleigh	166	35.925	0.125	46.847782	-100.138636	3801520540	01037072
Dry Fork	Williams	42	35.821	0.027	48.239948	-102.891040	3810520580	01037107
Dry Lake	Ramsey	44	29.885	6.157	48.233696	-98.990322	3807120620	01759571
Dublin	Williams	15	35.775	0.241	48.413512	-103.468389	3810520660	01037034
Duck Creek	Adams	24	35.933	0.000	46.075393	-102.559432	3800120700	01037208
Duerr	Richland	118	62.887	1.181	45.985537	-97.125100	3807720740	01036816
Dunbar	Sargent	103	36.079	0.008	46.160117	-97.560115	3808120820	01036803
Dundee	Walsh	90	35.984	0.000	48.499638	-97.731470	3809920900	01036547
Durbin	Cass	83	35.071	0.052	46.843963	-97.125564	3801721100	01036363
Durham	Stutsman	50	35.446	0.518	47.190025	-98.647352	3809321140	01036499
Dwight	Richland	313	45.206	0.125	46.318783	-96.699639	3807721260	01036838
Eagle	Richland	252	42.260	0.000	46.532299	-96.782159	3807721300	01036853
Easby	Cavalier	41	35.825	0.224	48.677440	-98.252322	3801921460	01759356
East Alma	Cavalier	23	35.933	0.032	48.674603	-97.981632	3801921500	01759357
East Fork	Benson	35	35.906	0.046	47.900847	-99.736804	3800521620	01759240
East Fork	Williams	18	36.355	0.021	48.334297	-103.529983	3810521660	01037029
Eastman	Foster	17	35.594	0.452	47.362772	-98.552782	3803121700	01759421
Easton	Steele	54	36.028	0.022	47.450316	-97.782184	3809121740	01036667
Eckelson	Barnes	111	34.920	1.379	46.943362	-98.381124	3800321820	01036422
Ecklund	Burleigh	103	53.927	0.000	47.113349	-100.717601	3801521860	01037134
Eddy	Eddy	39	35.801	0.662	47.789076	-98.695794	3802721980	01759403
Eden	Walsh	42	35.808	0.000	48.238309	-97.708989	3809922020	01036519
Eden Valley	Renville	44	43.497	0.144	48.945145	-101.550537	3807522100	01759603
Edendale	Steele	60	36.009	0.000	47.368120	-97.538141	3809122060	01036658
Edgemont	Sheridan	19	35.487	0.759	47.363804	-100.598227	3808322220	01759630
Edmunds	Stutsman	35	34.774	0.640	47.284080	-98.901227	3809322420	01036510
Edna	Barnes	76	34.444	1.346	47.117861	-98.267525	3800322460	01036432
Egan	Mountrail	36	34.003	2.549	48.333532	-101.976185	3806122500	01036936
Egg Creek	McHenry	65	34.291	2.106	48.334177	-100.811029	3804922580	01759489
Eidsvold	Bottineau	35	58.655	0.907	48.857283	-100.808057	3800922620	01759274
Elden	Dickey	73	36.159	0.000	46.068130	-98.567720	3802122740	01036758
Eldon	Benson	35	35.992	0.078	48.071239	-99.382819	3800522780	01759241
Eldorado	Traill	107	35.808	0.376	47.461345	-97.017106	3809722820	01036691
Eldred	Cass	106	35.293	0.146	46.767340	-97.482777	3801722860	01036368
Eldridge	Stutsman	123	34.745	0.993	46.930048	-98.871739	3809322940	01036472
Elgin	Cavalier	242	34.226	0.276	48.754013	-98.420091	3801922980	01759358
Elk Creek	Golden Valley	7	35.662	0.067	47.100834	-103.859674	3803323100	01759433
Elkhorn	Divide	26	59.514	2.954	48.946084	-103.957999	3802323140	01036935
Elkmount	Grand Forks	50	35.860	0.129	48.154585	-97.826111	3803523180	01036627
Ellendale	Dickey	115	34.485	0.069	45.974144	-98.579443	3802123260	01036746
Elling	Pierce	46	34.215	2.030	48.072429	-100.162059	3806923300	01759553
Elliott	Ransom	79	35.758	0.022	46.420179	-97.856776	3807323380	01036873
Ellisville	Williams	14	35.797	0.120	48.495924	-103.461339	3810523420	01037040
Ellsbury	Barnes	28	35.941	0.000	47.196454	-97.769402	3800323500	01036435
Elm	Dickey	76	35.870	0.271	45.983840	-98.704040	3802123540	01036748
Elm	Grant	46	34.751	0.000	46.415197	-101.735825	3803723580	01759437
Elm Grove	Grand Forks	120	36.474	0.000	47.976937	-97.688446	3803523700	01036613
Elm River	Traill	32	28.995	0.000	47.281269	-96.891314	3809723740	01036677
Elm Tree	McKenzie	44	39.033	4.854	48.087667	-102.903050	3805323820	01759522
Elma	Richland	78	35.551	0.922	45.976032	-96.980851	3807723620	01036815
Elmdale	Ward	50	35.515	0.468	48.673829	-102.158074	3810123660	01759676
Elms	Bottineau	57	35.945	0.017	48.596380	-101.244703	3800923780	01759275
Elora	Pembina	62	35.772	0.000	48.586540	-97.600438	3806723900	01036715
Elverum	Pierce	34	32.151	3.755	48.144440	-99.901876	3806923940	01759554
Elysian	Bottineau	33	35.778	0.071	48.668814	-100.591759	3800923980	01759276
Empire	Cass	114	35.926	0.016	47.014020	-97.377769	3801724140	01036387
Enger	Steele	76	35.780	0.018	47.547778	-97.524532	3809124340	01036669
Ensign	Renville	127	35.741	0.012	48.501911	-101.256516	3807524460	01759604
Enterprise	Nelson	27	35.186	0.861	48.155070	-98.216792	3806324500	01036582
Equality	Williams	46	35.145	0.049	48.332937	-103.143531	3810524580	01037026
Erie	Cass	109	35.854	0.180	47.111664	-97.377121	3801724660	01036388
Ervin	Traill	160	36.403	0.016	47.548594	-97.037723	3809724740	01036700
Esmond	Benson	37	34.756	0.852	48.066125	-99.789940	3800524820	02397798
Estabrook	Foster	74	35.882	0.016	47.545978	-99.070787	3803124900	01759422
Estherville	Burleigh	31	35.495	0.000	47.201007	-100.559057	3801524940	01037140
Eureka	Ward	367	35.977	0.488	48.328201	-101.337501	3810124980	01759677
Everest	Cass	88	35.128	0.000	46.846841	-97.241471	3801725020	01036365
Evergreen	Ward	7	33.561	2.266	48.233809	-101.848749	3810125060	01033968
Excelsior	Kidder	37	35.572	0.519	46.937521	-100.023237	3804325100	01759471
Fairbanks	Renville	37	35.720	0.267	48.770854	-101.944925	3807525140	01759605
Fairfield	Grand Forks	117	35.506	0.028	47.802659	-97.300658	3803525260	01036595
Fairmount	Richland	90	40.885	0.000	46.023972	-96.602143	3807725340	01036817
Fairview	Sheridan	6	34.984	0.196	47.619787	-100.061654	3808325420	01037150
Fairville	Wells	35	35.357	0.035	47.623788	-99.319445	3810325500	01759699
Falconer	Grand Forks	304	12.373	0.136	47.984060	-97.077114	3803525540	01036601
Falsen	McHenry	20	35.849	0.082	48.156073	-100.678258	3804925620	01759490
Fancher	Ramsey	51	35.236	0.501	48.412962	-98.514478	3807125660	01759572
Fargo	Cass	4	0.099	0.000	46.943881	-96.794706	3801725740	02397799
Farina	Hettinger	18	36.273	0.194	46.415571	-102.510459	3804125780	01759454
Farmington	Walsh	176	36.298	0.000	48.499500	-97.469800	3809925860	01036545
Farmvale	Williams	37	35.830	0.040	48.245979	-103.017418	3810525900	01037023
Fay	Burke	21	35.854	0.040	48.847892	-102.730006	3801325940	01759320
Felson	Pembina	86	44.824	0.000	48.945971	-97.622116	3806725980	01036737
Ferry	Grand Forks	359	45.986	0.190	48.059133	-97.176811	3803526020	01036616
Fertile	Mountrail	68	35.795	0.011	47.884344	-102.169646	3806126060	01037016
Fertile	Walsh	250	36.105	0.000	48.412673	-97.600974	3809926100	01036536
Fertile Valley	Divide	23	64.694	4.210	48.670099	-103.917608	3802326140	01036924
Field	Nelson	44	35.874	0.086	47.795572	-98.064626	3806326220	01036563
Fillmore	Divide	35	40.858	1.153	48.945165	-103.257244	3802326340	01759389
Finley	Steele	52	32.389	0.076	47.540155	-97.782330	3809126460	01036673
Finn	Logan	16	33.805	0.837	46.589964	-99.103020	3804726500	01037201
Fischbein	Bowman	15	35.112	0.296	46.162279	-103.036535	3801126540	01037240
Fisher	Grant	16	32.939	0.053	46.245642	-101.685440	3803726580	01759438
Flint	Stutsman	40	32.887	2.635	46.949140	-99.235948	3809326740	01036476
Florance	Foster	32	34.734	1.156	47.536802	-98.681563	3803126820	01759423
Foothills	Burke	21	35.180	0.802	48.761614	-102.602275	3801326940	01037102
Forde	Nelson	34	35.351	0.635	47.723052	-98.468818	3806327020	01036561
Forest River	Walsh	63	35.654	0.000	48.238638	-97.448458	3809927140	01036517
Forman	Sargent	48	35.323	0.000	46.065776	-97.696366	3808127300	01036795
Fort Ransom	Ransom	96	35.461	0.022	46.492226	-97.961959	3807327620	01036878
Forthun	Burke	11	43.221	0.059	48.945558	-102.869671	3801327460	01759321
Forward	Wells	80	35.571	0.492	47.716087	-99.875901	3810327900	01759700
Foxholm	Ward	121	36.371	0.001	48.335356	-101.586138	3810128020	01036944
Fram	Wells	58	35.971	0.025	47.805447	-99.720077	3810328060	01759701
Francis	Burleigh	26	35.833	0.000	46.938859	-100.518334	3801528100	01759337
Franklin	Steele	41	35.842	0.148	47.535954	-97.910401	3809128140	01036675
Frazier	Divide	22	35.055	0.990	48.771185	-103.246018	3802328220	01037013
Freda	Grant	10	35.916	0.040	46.311244	-101.083890	3803728300	01037081
Frederick	Divide	18	35.774	0.122	48.683979	-103.331090	3802328340	01759390
Freeborn	Eddy	102	36.058	0.326	47.799708	-98.618657	3802728420	01759404
Freedom	Ward	135	35.417	0.633	48.063698	-101.333576	3810128460	01037121
Freeman	Richland	40	35.877	0.000	46.412920	-97.217810	3807728500	01036851
Fremont	Cavalier	55	55.407	0.070	48.957096	-98.026713	3801928540	01759359
Freshwater	Ramsey	75	27.717	8.275	48.247198	-98.875897	3807128580	01759573
Frettim	Kidder	9	33.267	2.562	47.194131	-99.686959	3804328620	01759472
Fried	Stutsman	155	35.328	0.667	47.019878	-98.645603	3809328700	01036481
Galesburg	Traill	83	34.880	0.088	47.275052	-97.377726	3809729020	01036686
Garborg	Richland	96	36.048	0.000	46.412706	-97.092507	3807729060	01036849
Gardar	Pembina	95	35.900	0.000	48.586565	-97.861858	3806729140	01036721
Gardner	Cass	107	35.597	0.000	47.107857	-97.006614	3801729260	01036382
Garfield	Traill	169	34.932	0.000	47.628405	-97.408709	3809729300	01036709
Garner	Golden Valley	14	35.859	0.033	46.763852	-103.793192	3803329340	01037077
Garness	Burke	41	35.734	0.238	48.597470	-102.530731	3801329380	01037106
Garnet	Divide	21	35.442	0.292	48.669724	-103.461253	3802329420	01759391
Gascoyne	Bowman	13	35.480	0.056	46.061063	-103.047437	3801129580	01037242
Gasman	Ward	158	34.968	1.188	47.986054	-101.292254	3810129620	01036994
Gate	McLean	20	35.695	0.203	47.798190	-101.798760	3805529660	01759533
Gates	Eddy	43	35.488	0.371	47.804082	-99.083995	3802729700	01759405
Gem	Bowman	22	35.850	0.092	46.073648	-103.419814	3801129740	01037224
Gerber	Stutsman	9	33.576	2.101	47.187874	-99.442872	3809329860	01036506
German	Dickey	17	34.005	1.475	46.156786	-98.922493	3802129900	01036781
Germania	Stutsman	19	35.610	0.332	46.675105	-99.257982	3809329940	01036449
Germantown	Wells	29	35.084	0.189	47.623931	-99.447789	3810329980	01759702
Gerrard	Towner	13	35.513	0.353	48.590734	-99.288985	3809530020	01759652
Getchell	Barnes	73	34.780	1.037	47.015317	-98.031442	3800330060	01036427
Ghylin	Burleigh	41	35.645	0.000	47.112656	-100.559283	3801530100	01037191
Gibbs	Burleigh	1,858	34.993	0.015	46.858129	-100.636969	3801530140	01037185
Gilby	Grand Forks	79	36.048	0.000	48.064200	-97.449288	3803530220	01036618
Gill	Cass	117	35.963	0.046	46.843247	-97.356306	3801730260	01036367
Gilmore	McHenry	13	35.487	0.670	48.411278	-100.722523	3804930300	01759491
Gilstrap	Adams	20	35.932	0.013	45.987824	-102.308144	3800130340	01037216
Glacier	Stutsman	22	34.668	0.973	47.282161	-99.172785	3809330380	01036512
Gladstone	LaMoure	51	36.012	0.000	46.500244	-98.222510	3804530420	01036897
Glen	LaMoure	38	33.995	1.371	46.588078	-98.953320	3804530540	01036917
Glendale	Logan	55	36.676	0.060	46.597063	-99.709798	3804730620	01037061
Glenfield	Foster	51	35.698	0.137	47.451722	-98.551615	3803130700	02397804
Glenila	Cavalier	13	35.753	0.124	48.832189	-98.963324	3801930780	01759360
Glenmore	LaMoure	53	35.959	0.000	46.500403	-98.725003	3804530820	01036905
Glenview	Burleigh	216	38.731	0.620	47.014586	-100.840657	3801530900	01037255
Glenwood	Walsh	201	35.732	0.000	48.499275	-97.600521	3809930940	01036546
Golden	Walsh	101	35.796	0.209	48.411901	-97.853075	3809931060	01036538
Golden Glen	LaMoure	108	35.272	0.077	46.323193	-98.733664	3804531100	01036891
Golden Lake	Steele	59	34.846	1.163	47.538741	-97.649068	3809131140	01036671
Golden Valley	Williams	19	35.960	0.130	48.423255	-103.070387	3810531260	01037031
Goldfield	Bowman	35	36.007	0.010	45.988073	-103.183244	3801131300	01759309
Good Luck	Williams	26	35.859	0.016	48.496096	-103.852512	3810531460	01759726
Goodrich	Sheridan	29	33.508	2.207	47.457434	-100.086640	3808331540	01037153
Gooseneck	Divide	31	42.457	0.826	48.949658	-103.651852	3802331580	01036931
Gordon	Cavalier	11	26.638	0.403	48.681024	-98.653205	3801931620	01759361
Grace	Grand Forks	81	36.379	0.017	47.801910	-97.688428	3803531700	01036598
Graf	Kidder	20	31.403	4.599	46.673377	-99.506838	3804331780	01037056
Grafton	Walsh	288	34.206	0.000	48.412415	-97.473110	3809931860	01036535
Grail	McKenzie	39	31.647	0.000	47.804122	-102.841792	3805331900	01759521
Grainbelt	Bowman	24	30.572	0.008	46.247471	-103.308195	3801131940	01759310
Grainfield	Towner	36	35.626	0.092	48.666559	-99.421484	3809531980	01759653
Grand Forks	Grand Forks	505	10.950	0.065	47.878811	-97.053463	3803532100	01036600
Grand Harbor	Ramsey	163	34.124	1.910	48.140191	-99.002142	3807132260	01759574
Grand Prairie	Barnes	48	36.194	0.000	47.109684	-97.896712	3800332340	01036426
Grand Rapids	LaMoure	90	35.937	0.000	46.413323	-98.347976	3804532420	01036898
Grand River	Bowman	12	35.924	0.008	45.996181	-103.561415	3801132460	01759311
Grand Valley	Dickey	25	36.045	0.163	46.069234	-98.818496	3802132500	01036761
Grandfield	Eddy	22	35.837	0.093	47.802941	-99.230327	3802732020	01759406
Grandview	LaMoure	45	35.849	0.068	46.503868	-98.337734	3804532540	01036899
Grant	Richland	102	33.600	1.701	46.057287	-97.218644	3807732620	01036824
Granville	McHenry	107	35.157	0.784	48.233663	-100.811777	3804932700	02397806
Grass Lake	Burleigh	69	35.462	0.568	47.204041	-100.675088	3801532740	01037184
Grassland	Renville	21	33.229	2.487	48.683748	-101.625466	3807532780	01759606
Gray	Stutsman	41	33.737	0.882	47.118150	-98.522673	3809332860	01036480
Greatstone	McLean	44	36.008	0.009	47.710905	-101.056823	3805532940	01759534
Greely	Ward	16	34.818	1.035	47.888085	-101.028456	3810132980	01759679
Green	Barnes	84	35.353	0.458	46.841410	-98.112755	3800333020	01036413
Greenbush	Ward	20	35.800	0.000	48.589999	-101.907907	3810133100	01759680
Greendale	Richland	104	36.211	0.060	45.971942	-96.830406	3807733140	01036814
Greene	Ransom	109	34.794	0.455	46.579511	-97.458626	3807333180	01036880
Greenfield	Griggs	102	34.910	0.000	47.283601	-98.151423	3803933260	01036632
Greenfield	Traill	72	35.342	0.000	47.281341	-97.260955	3809733340	01036684
Greenland	Barnes	42	36.167	0.000	46.674716	-98.375846	3800333380	01036405
Greenview	Steele	44	35.995	0.034	47.460338	-97.910531	3809133420	01036668
Greenville	LaMoure	47	35.871	0.091	46.420235	-98.086495	3804533460	01036894
Grenora	Williams	8	31.487	0.898	48.580057	-103.987275	3810533540	02397808
Grey	Cavalier	20	35.503	0.613	48.842876	-98.791771	3801933580	01759362
Griffin	Stutsman	51	35.911	0.117	46.667116	-99.123441	3809333660	01036448
Grilley	McHenry	55	35.928	0.098	48.509585	-100.984442	3804933700	01759492
Grover	Renville	27	35.829	0.006	48.853751	-101.819084	3807533740	01759607
Gunkel	Cass	43	36.184	0.000	47.108252	-97.133541	3801733820	01036384
Gutschmidt	Logan	28	35.991	0.463	46.507858	-99.106908	3804733940	01037051
Haag	Logan	25	35.960	0.000	46.326595	-99.100267	3804734060	01037182
Haaland	Wells	46	35.350	0.212	47.450335	-99.703377	3810334100	01037130
Hagel	Pierce	87	35.816	0.124	47.883593	-99.866122	3806934140	01759555
Haley	Bowman	23	35.974	0.039	45.990252	-103.052381	3801134260	01037241
Hall	Sargent	130	36.018	0.041	46.246005	-97.332225	3808134300	01036799
Hamburg	Dickey	34	36.177	0.051	46.161733	-98.694879	3802134500	01036777
Hamburg	Wells	39	35.248	0.729	47.716658	-99.479752	3810334540	01759703
Hamerly	Renville	25	35.858	0.000	48.850276	-101.693424	3807534580	01759608
Hamilton	Pembina	42	44.649	0.000	48.771700	-97.491387	3806734660	01036726
Hamlet	Renville	50	35.700	0.236	48.756268	-101.682560	3807534700	01759609
Hamlin	Nelson	69	34.658	0.113	47.809989	-98.214925	3806334780	01036564
Hammer	Ramsey	52	35.155	0.709	48.406612	-98.905957	3807134820	01759575
Hanson	Ransom	69	35.959	0.019	46.416419	-97.955633	3807335180	01036876
Haram	Bottineau	72	43.546	0.061	48.945466	-100.632818	3800935220	01759277
Harding	Ramsey	33	36.455	0.074	48.332508	-98.735376	3807135300	01759576
Hardscrabble	Williams	86	50.245	0.010	48.071097	-103.943279	3810535340	01759727
Harlem	Sargent	41	35.949	0.127	46.152653	-97.811391	3808135420	01036808
Harmonious	Burke	20	35.492	0.540	48.771240	-102.890519	3801335540	01759322
Harmony	Cass	81	34.426	0.107	46.941011	-97.127136	3801735580	01036374
Harper	Slope	4	35.670	0.060	46.410454	-103.605754	3808735620	01037169
Harriet-Lien	Burleigh	67	68.948	2.969	47.075347	-100.187816	3801535670	02397810
Harrison	Ward	1,872	22.461	0.030	48.242550	-101.359321	3810135700	01759681
Harriston	Walsh	131	34.354	0.000	48.326310	-97.317118	3809935740	01036525
Harvey	Cavalier	32	35.761	0.149	48.841661	-98.268925	3801935860	01759363
Harwood	Cass	352	30.978	0.029	47.019896	-96.880922	3801735980	01036379
Hastings	Bottineau	47	35.800	0.061	48.770360	-101.179725	3800936060	01759278
Havelock	Hettinger	23	35.575	0.009	46.496419	-102.734681	3804136220	01037230
Haven	Foster	35	35.288	0.627	47.449995	-98.830279	3803136260	01759424
Hawkeye	Divide	33	35.217	0.800	48.854155	-103.265903	3802336300	01759392
Hawkeye	McKenzie	49	33.545	0.015	47.984799	-102.844447	3805336340	01759520
Hawksnest	Wells	21	35.923	0.156	47.374286	-99.320442	3810336380	01037186
Hay	Cavalier	35	35.859	0.105	48.760758	-98.145712	3801936420	01759364
Hay Creek	Burleigh	4,057	27.405	0.742	46.870395	-100.798273	3801536460	01037123
Hayland	Divide	21	35.074	0.875	48.689023	-103.077445	3802336500	01037010
Haynes	Kidder	18	34.345	1.498	47.025004	-99.924975	3804336580	01759473
Hazel	Williams	21	35.164	0.402	48.590857	-103.222091	3810536620	01037012
Hazel Grove	Burleigh	15	34.127	0.823	47.296127	-100.175186	3801536660	01037156
Hebron	Williams	34	50.418	0.007	48.248263	-103.960094	3810536900	01759728
Hegton	Grand Forks	204	36.190	0.345	47.983184	-97.560168	3803536940	01036610
Heimdal	Wells	56	35.588	0.392	47.795167	-99.600398	3810337060	01759704
Helena	Griggs	50	35.982	0.096	47.375527	-98.320293	3803937100	01036636
Helendale	Richland	104	35.012	0.000	46.579655	-97.208619	3807737140	01036857
Hemen	Barnes	27	35.161	0.928	46.847020	-98.258532	3800337180	01036415
Henderson	Cavalier	40	27.921	1.234	48.682551	-98.780080	3801937220	01759365
Hendrickson	McHenry	55	36.070	0.077	48.159002	-100.829689	3804937260	01759493
Henrietta	LaMoure	84	36.014	0.030	46.417388	-98.466085	3804537300	01036900
Henry	Golden Valley	23	72.402	0.056	47.233788	-103.989164	3803337340	01759435
Herberg	Traill	65	33.721	0.036	47.360274	-96.910231	3809737460	01036678
Herman	Sargent	56	35.899	0.043	46.157251	-97.323288	3808137500	01036798
Hesper	Benson	56	35.386	0.700	47.978832	-99.614941	3800537660	01759242
Hettinger	Adams	195	34.887	0.213	45.986149	-102.682527	3800137740	01037221
Hidden	Stutsman	50	35.303	0.719	47.034318	-98.918706	3809337820	01036487
Hiddenwood	Ward	24	35.366	0.548	47.898476	-101.796935	3810137860	01036952
Highland	Cass	94	35.742	0.192	46.678720	-97.480169	3801737900	01036356
Highland	Hettinger	15	34.372	0.023	46.579904	-102.229950	3804137940	01759455
Highland	Sheridan	19	35.275	0.756	47.731604	-100.509717	3808337980	01759631
Highland Center	Ramsey	43	35.799	0.212	48.505054	-98.372819	3807138020	01759577
Hill	Cass	53	35.859	0.000	46.847245	-97.618836	3801738060	01036371
Hillsboro	Traill	132	34.812	0.000	47.366262	-97.026520	3809738140	01036680
Hillsdale	Eddy	41	34.816	1.598	47.797238	-98.856842	3802738180	01759407
Hillsdale	Wells	107	35.706	0.169	47.811232	-99.994593	3810338220	01759705
Hilton	Ward	53	35.876	0.347	47.985824	-101.433080	3810138260	01036993
Hobart	Barnes	111	34.380	1.678	46.936461	-98.117259	3800338300	01036420
Hoffman	Bottineau	17	35.721	0.127	48.845094	-101.417256	3800938380	01759279
Homen	Bottineau	118	38.705	5.814	48.943035	-100.271717	3800938540	01759280
Homer	Stutsman	289	34.066	0.007	46.841175	-98.618355	3809338620	01036454
Homestead	Richland	90	36.067	0.000	46.325787	-97.092439	3807738660	01036843
Hope	Cavalier	24	29.623	0.124	48.930492	-98.156792	3801938820	01759366
Hope	Ramsey	7	34.209	1.730	48.140636	-98.476234	3807138840	01759584
Horseshoe Valley	McLean	27	35.285	0.762	47.735178	-100.883978	3805538940	01759535
Howe	Grant	12	31.634	0.021	46.088063	-101.798896	3803739060	01759439
Howell	Towner	28	35.673	0.320	48.764896	-99.335346	3809539100	01759654
Howes	Cass	78	35.700	0.121	46.854076	-97.482350	3801739140	01036369
Howie	Mountrail	48	26.888	8.886	47.898456	-102.432869	3806139180	01037115
Hudson	Dickey	88	33.941	0.327	46.073544	-98.194385	3802139220	01036753
Hughes	Slope	6	35.105	0.226	46.327515	-103.876868	3808739300	01037165
Hugo	Steele	43	35.863	0.000	47.368795	-97.665625	3809139340	01036660
Hume	Slope	25	35.479	0.000	46.410227	-103.113363	3808739420	01759642
Hunter	Cass	64	34.317	0.065	47.202720	-97.266496	3801739500	01036396
Hurley	Renville	40	35.637	0.033	48.844208	-101.549308	3807539620	01759610
Huron	Cavalier	24	35.678	0.404	48.765861	-98.794365	3801939660	01759367
Ibsen	Richland	105	36.238	0.000	46.325995	-96.841226	3807739700	01036840
Idaho	Mountrail	493	33.600	1.146	48.329097	-102.369734	3806139740	01037046
Illinois	Nelson	70	35.018	1.227	47.980183	-98.466110	3806339820	01036575
Impark	Benson	29	31.682	4.318	48.142019	-99.790245	3800539860	01759243
Inkster	Grand Forks	139	35.407	0.173	48.144102	-97.719856	3803540020	01036626
Iosco	Stutsman	17	33.597	2.292	47.044255	-99.287270	3809340100	01036493
Iota Flat	Ward	39	35.381	0.724	47.884289	-101.157027	3810140140	01759682
Iowa	Benson	25	33.566	2.323	48.250829	-99.789896	3800540180	01759244
Irvine	Benson	16	35.889	0.714	48.332679	-99.255030	3800540220	01759245
Isabel	Benson	46	35.505	0.593	48.064751	-99.653077	3800540260	01759246
Island Park	Ransom	262	33.838	0.051	46.407660	-97.731546	3807340300	01036871
Isley	Ransom	44	35.882	0.225	46.333228	-97.961633	3807340340	01036864
Ivanhoe	Renville	30	35.929	0.000	48.589900	-101.777552	3807540380	01759611
Jackson	Sargent	33	35.809	0.000	46.066276	-97.945530	3808140460	01036797
James Hill	Mountrail	32	31.820	4.243	48.423125	-102.429934	3806140500	01037048
James River Valley	Dickey	40	28.597	0.000	46.246641	-98.188329	3802140540	01036767
Janke	Logan	28	35.995	0.163	46.415512	-99.131701	3804740620	01037193
Jefferson	Pierce	45	35.069	1.125	48.232149	-100.182370	3806940700	01759556
Jim River Valley	Stutsman	38	34.134	1.746	47.112388	-98.778478	3809340780	01036484
Johnson	Wells	36	35.299	0.908	47.377745	-99.458677	3810340820	01037137
Johnstown	Grand Forks	79	36.199	0.000	48.151362	-97.449033	3803540940	01036624
Joliette	Pembina	67	70.044	0.771	48.796545	-97.217227	3806741020	01036723
Judson	Williams	130	35.854	0.016	48.159374	-103.800650	3810541260	01036978
Kandiyohi	Burke	39	33.216	2.686	48.583099	-102.319674	3801341280	01037090
Kane	Bottineau	57	31.547	1.288	48.755714	-100.917243	3800941300	01759281
Karlsruhe	McHenry	38	34.283	1.109	48.066778	-100.561299	3804941420	02397818
Keene	McKenzie	41	36.881	0.000	47.978971	-102.962365	3805341580	01036969
Keller	Burke	33	35.799	0.247	48.850211	-102.872177	3801341660	01759323
Kelso	Traill	69	35.067	0.000	47.281432	-97.006838	3809741860	01036679
Kenmare	Ward	104	33.312	1.212	48.683915	-102.027850	3810142060	02397819
Kennedy	Hettinger	33	36.067	0.068	46.330491	-102.871922	3804142100	01037232
Kennison	LaMoure	108	35.832	0.019	46.580123	-98.714723	3804542140	01036915
Kensal	Stutsman	44	32.208	2.715	47.278032	-98.805841	3809342220	01036509
Kensington	Walsh	244	33.789	0.076	48.416067	-97.721640	3809942260	01036537
Kent	Dickey	29	35.881	0.025	46.073475	-98.317906	3802142300	01036755
Kentner	Dickey	183	36.114	0.009	46.070600	-98.431761	3802142340	01036757
Kern	Hettinger	20	32.362	0.020	46.234600	-102.299734	3804142420	01037211
Keystone	Dickey	44	35.891	0.000	46.155029	-98.566732	3802142500	01036774
Kickapoo	Mountrail	28	33.414	2.472	48.237425	-102.009372	3806142620	01036938
Kingsley	Griggs	50	36.039	0.000	47.456928	-98.435797	3803942820	01036645
Kingston	Sargent	85	41.940	0.375	46.057775	-97.310097	3808142860	01036792
Kinloss	Walsh	32	35.325	0.393	48.504520	-98.266561	3809942900	01036551
Kinyon	Cass	91	36.022	0.000	47.195064	-97.006279	3801742980	01036394
Kirkelie	Ward	436	36.393	0.058	48.325754	-101.476236	3810143020	01759683
Klingstrup	Ramsey	46	35.870	0.000	48.500605	-98.905402	3807143100	01759578
Knife River	Mountrail	34	35.691	0.278	48.068334	-102.505444	3806143220	01037095
Knox	Benson	28	35.788	0.605	48.328429	-99.644306	3800543300	02397822
Kohlmeier	Rolette	27	35.255	0.435	48.682919	-100.070089	3807943340	01759624
Kottke Valley	McHenry	49	35.642	0.000	48.327400	-100.950435	3804943460	01759494
Kunze	Hettinger	51	36.429	0.028	46.584716	-102.868980	3804143620	01759457
La Moure	Pembina	108	35.907	0.063	48.854886	-97.894673	3806744580	01036734
Ladd	Bowman	15	36.028	0.007	45.981625	-103.442141	3801143700	01037223
Lake	Cass	34	35.995	0.051	47.100943	-97.638166	3801743780	01036392
Lake George	McHenry	40	35.248	0.832	48.058477	-100.420501	3804943820	01759495
Lake Hester	McHenry	45	35.673	0.289	48.058731	-100.701650	3804943860	01759496
Lake Ibsen	Benson	23	33.646	2.260	48.240571	-99.386086	3800543900	01759247
Lake Town	Barnes	39	34.549	1.002	47.204534	-98.278848	3800343980	01036439
Lake Washington	Eddy	27	31.803	4.121	47.703618	-98.741656	3802744100	01759408
Lake Williams	Kidder	22	31.272	4.549	47.116437	-99.643918	3804344180	01037125
Lake Williams	McLean	59	32.401	3.166	47.547789	-100.848907	3805544220	01759536
Lakeview	Burke	14	49.664	1.892	48.873809	-102.059673	3801344020	01759324
Lakeville	Grand Forks	69	35.475	0.475	48.070445	-97.330478	3803544060	01036617
Lakota	Nelson	50	34.184	0.897	48.071798	-98.390017	3806344340	01036579
Lallie	Benson	453	48.969	5.437	47.998210	-99.148192	3800544420	01759248
LaMars	Richland	78	35.933	0.000	45.979085	-96.701054	3807744500	01036813
Lampton	Walsh	106	35.636	0.040	48.506854	-97.851202	3809944620	01036548
Land	McHenry	37	34.361	0.406	47.898396	-100.531606	3804944660	01759497
Langberg	Bowman	16	35.844	0.057	45.994086	-103.679037	3801144740	01759312
Langdon	Cavalier	29	35.956	0.170	48.848503	-98.409521	3801944820	02397824
Lansford	Bottineau	73	35.510	0.029	48.582135	-101.375413	3800944940	02397825
Lansing	Towner	4	36.132	0.129	48.855345	-99.077384	3809544980	01759655
Larimore	Grand Forks	117	35.819	0.016	47.882955	-97.698635	3803545060	01036612
Lark	Grant	46	35.998	0.000	46.414937	-101.361735	3803745140	01037087
Larrabee	Foster	56	34.810	0.693	47.536768	-98.808823	3803145180	01759425
Latona	Walsh	56	35.077	1.136	48.332263	-98.087311	3809945260	01036531
Lawton	Ramsey	28	34.388	0.905	48.326338	-98.336809	3807145340	02397826
Layton	McHenry	29	35.969	0.078	48.503848	-100.731160	3804945380	01759498
Leaf Mountain	Burke	21	34.777	1.216	48.756803	-102.754382	3801345420	01037110
Lebanon	McHenry	79	35.496	0.616	48.058771	-100.809781	3804945500	01759499
Lee	Nelson	42	35.801	0.168	47.715492	-98.076194	3806345540	01036558
Leeds	Benson	91	35.704	0.653	48.328857	-99.389494	3800545620	02397827
Leipzig	Grant	39	35.979	0.001	46.508641	-101.850774	3803745820	01037083
Lenora	Griggs	60	34.788	0.457	47.629472	-98.047760	3803945900	01036648
Lenton	Stutsman	64	36.175	0.018	46.763062	-98.885230	3809345940	01036457
Leonard	Cass	108	35.229	0.000	46.673349	-97.241088	3801746020	01036354
Leval	Nelson	29	31.777	4.092	47.889716	-98.461717	3806346140	01036574
Levant	Grand Forks	58	35.953	0.000	48.150883	-97.319393	3803546180	01036623
Lewis	Bottineau	34	35.954	0.000	48.676017	-101.124798	3800946260	01759282
Liberty	Mountrail	23	13.461	22.242	47.880243	-102.297452	3806146340	01037043
Liberty	Ransom	118	34.344	0.005	46.579923	-97.610651	3807346380	01036881
Liberty Grove	Richland	114	35.837	0.019	46.145505	-97.063343	3807746420	01036834
Lightning Creek	Adams	14	36.060	0.000	45.988569	-102.933144	3800146500	01034174
Lillehoff	Ramsey	25	33.680	1.409	48.245066	-98.357284	3807146620	01759579
Lincoln	Pembina	41	46.288	0.328	48.675414	-97.198304	3806746660	01036711
Lincoln Dale	Sheridan	27	34.988	0.250	47.630821	-100.351011	3808346700	01759633
Lincoln Valley	Divide	22	35.304	0.706	48.843764	-103.662734	3802346740	01036930
Lind	Grand Forks	62	36.107	0.046	47.715442	-97.688858	3803546820	01036590
Lindaas	Traill	114	34.888	0.000	47.542410	-97.281677	3809746860	01036705
Lindahl	Williams	45	35.641	0.233	48.481159	-102.962421	3810546900	01037035
Linden	Cavalier	25	42.624	1.816	48.945472	-98.666560	3801946940	01759368
Linton	Ward	31	34.475	1.533	48.071039	-101.745067	3810147020	01036957
Lippert	Stutsman	96	35.745	0.415	46.856767	-98.872523	3809347060	01036458
Litchville	LaMoure	49	35.999	0.066	46.594131	-98.086321	3804547180	01036910
Little Deep	McHenry	51	36.292	0.018	48.509431	-100.852635	3804947260	01759500
Loam	Cavalier	41	34.337	0.088	48.854393	-98.155189	3801947380	01759369
Lockwood	Renville	24	35.600	0.319	48.596951	-101.507167	3807547420	01759612
Lodema	Pembina	69	36.190	0.000	48.673884	-97.600731	3806747460	01036716
Logan	Burleigh	36	35.823	0.208	46.771665	-100.399162	3801547500	01759338
Logan Center	Grand Forks	44	36.081	0.021	47.809903	-97.812781	3803547580	01036599
Lohnes	Benson	36	19.957	1.753	47.956329	-98.705852	3800547620	01759249
Lone Tree	Golden Valley	126	105.069	0.130	46.713111	-103.951491	3803347700	01037205
Long Creek	Divide	37	42.592	0.903	48.944096	-103.126212	3802347780	01759393
Long Lake	Burleigh	103	32.246	3.787	46.671655	-100.275198	3801547860	01037067
Longfellow	McLean	38	36.091	0.054	47.451742	-101.254669	3805547820	01759537
Longview	Foster	47	35.364	0.753	47.365433	-99.207755	3803147900	01037138
Loquemont	McLean	62	35.901	0.041	47.710140	-102.075634	3805547940	01759538
Lordsburg	Bottineau	19	35.341	0.825	48.769624	-100.228663	3800948060	01759283
Loretta	Grand Forks	50	36.138	0.000	47.715705	-97.817996	3803548100	01036591
Lorraine	Dickey	35	35.611	0.028	45.986327	-98.824337	3802148140	01036749
Lostwood	Mountrail	40	34.276	1.569	48.503029	-102.419021	3806148220	01037117
Lovell	Dickey	42	43.572	0.484	45.979477	-98.080806	3802148260	01036742
Lowery	Stutsman	33	34.212	1.111	47.285621	-99.424886	3809348300	01037187
Lowland	Mountrail	52	34.469	1.610	48.506983	-102.025237	3806148340	01036980
Lucy	Burke	27	34.394	1.692	48.690915	-102.549425	3801348420	01759325
Lund	Ward	50	34.796	1.204	48.059167	-101.846052	3810148500	01036940
Lynn	Wells	21	34.710	1.455	47.370988	-99.979621	3810348660	01037155
Lyon	Stutsman	19	33.030	2.818	47.195251	-98.784930	3809348740	01036500
Mabel	Griggs	52	35.989	0.111	47.379473	-98.447327	3803948820	01036638
Madison	Hettinger	41	36.315	0.000	46.586935	-102.487125	3804149660	01759458
Maine	Adams	22	31.727	0.000	46.244371	-102.559556	3800149780	01037246
Malcolm	McLean	78	26.909	8.540	47.625122	-101.110332	3805549860	01759539
Mandan	Ward	51	34.174	1.682	48.247817	-101.717520	3810149940	01036948
Manfred	Wells	39	35.850	0.182	47.723093	-99.743839	3810350060	01759706
Manilla	Cavalier	83	35.728	0.309	48.761426	-98.277274	3801950100	01759370
Manitou	Mountrail	98	36.226	0.467	48.329571	-102.624520	3806150180	01759549
Manning	Kidder	65	69.341	2.245	46.706001	-99.876432	3804350260	01037063
Manns	Stutsman	78	36.083	0.004	46.667305	-98.492488	3809350300	01036441
Mansfield	Barnes	38	35.725	0.549	46.856369	-98.385958	3800350340	01036417
Maple	Dickey	49	35.742	0.019	46.147178	-98.452348	3802150500	01036772
Maple River	Cass	128	35.652	0.036	46.760708	-97.239523	3801750540	01036364
Mapleton	Cass	188	33.871	0.145	46.842672	-96.978964	3801750620	01036361
Marboe	Sargent	29	26.354	0.928	45.971178	-97.302467	3808150660	01036783
Margaret	Ward	85	36.028	0.072	48.407747	-101.114324	3810150700	01759684
Marion	Bowman	17	30.534	0.188	46.227645	-103.525472	3801150740	01037258
Marsh	Barnes	283	35.909	0.055	46.847984	-97.996901	3800350900	01036411
Marshall	Williams	51	36.322	0.000	48.328679	-103.409906	3810550980	01037028
Marstonmoor	Stutsman	23	34.500	1.368	47.115985	-99.407828	3809351020	01036496
Martin	Sheridan	40	34.727	1.182	47.803839	-100.123321	3808351100	02397832
Martin	Walsh	114	34.165	0.775	48.506272	-97.332039	3809951140	01036544
Maryland	Ward	70	36.193	0.102	48.334289	-101.068522	3810151220	01759685
Maryville	Rolette	37	35.733	0.289	48.754735	-99.712103	3807951260	01759625
Mauch	Sheridan	6	32.761	3.374	47.374121	-100.097616	3808351350	01037147
Mayland	Ward	70	35.793	0.110	48.415619	-101.647093	3810151460	01036943
Mayville	Traill	133	34.925	0.000	47.453447	-97.281930	3809751540	01036694
Maza	Towner	14	35.038	1.138	48.421290	-99.177432	3809551620	02397835
McAlmond	Mountrail	34	35.019	0.806	48.247662	-102.105846	3806148860	01036996
McClellan	Benson	46	35.817	0.146	48.151192	-99.395686	3800548980	01759250
McClusky	Sheridan	56	35.262	0.468	47.450731	-100.491639	3808349060	02397836
McGahan	Mountrail	55	34.591	1.914	48.331776	-102.104144	3806149140	01033994
McGinnis	McLean	58	35.423	0.675	47.724928	-101.411086	3805549180	01037002
McHenry	Foster	51	35.005	0.659	47.549274	-98.540120	3803149300	02397838
McKenzie	Burleigh	88	35.864	0.060	46.851179	-100.383637	3801549380	01759339
McKinley	Ward	140	36.479	0.047	48.331322	-101.199844	3810149420	01759686
McKinney	Renville	63	35.298	0.557	48.767216	-101.819319	3807549460	01759613
McKinnon	Foster	24	35.662	0.383	47.377328	-98.701941	3803149500	01759426
Meadow	McHenry	44	30.833	4.624	48.596476	-100.728023	3804951660	01759501
Meadow Lake	Barnes	81	36.113	0.259	46.761465	-98.353523	3800351700	01036416
Medford	Walsh	62	34.939	0.000	48.239001	-97.839744	3809951780	01759672
Medicine Hill	McLean	45	34.232	0.823	47.625111	-100.726531	3805551820	01759540
Mekinock	Grand Forks	2,535	36.467	0.000	47.976930	-97.429314	3803551980	01036608
Melrose	Steele	38	35.884	0.159	47.361819	-97.783455	3809152020	01036662
Melville	Foster	35	34.328	1.761	47.375061	-99.092756	3803152100	01759427
Melvin	Nelson	27	34.741	1.179	47.882486	-98.075161	3806352140	01036569
Menoken	Burleigh	154	35.867	0.061	46.851810	-100.528570	3801552220	01759340
Mentor	Divide	19	42.684	0.560	48.945233	-102.994591	3802352260	01759394
Menz	Sioux	28	46.702	0.036	45.998945	-101.928370	3808552300	01759638
Mercer	McLean	35	35.104	0.748	47.458475	-100.769480	3805552380	02397840
Merkel	Kidder	27	65.636	5.954	47.254294	-99.825642	3804352420	01759474
Merrill	Hettinger	10	32.029	0.264	46.241618	-102.175185	3804152540	01037210
Meyer	Pierce	92	34.055	2.762	48.320560	-99.913725	3806952580	01759557
Michigan	Grand Forks	139	36.053	0.016	47.723975	-97.183640	3803552620	01036586
Michigan	Nelson	58	57.458	2.259	48.029866	-98.099890	3806352640	01036577
Midland	Pembina	71	69.852	0.028	48.637163	-97.331762	3806752780	01036712
Midway	Stutsman	579	26.745	1.863	46.936959	-98.768206	3809352820	01036470
Mikkelson	LaMoure	37	35.608	0.080	46.591342	-98.842417	3804552860	01036916
Milnor	Sargent	97	32.636	1.570	46.240661	-97.438372	3808152980	01036801
Minco	Benson	19	28.550	0.455	47.869343	-98.597524	3800553060	01759251
Mineral Springs	Slope	23	35.889	0.027	46.315275	-103.228572	3808753100	01759643
Minnehaha	Bowman	24	32.898	3.116	45.979537	-103.288825	3801153140	01037228
Minnesota	Burke	21	52.472	0.978	48.857937	-102.184938	3801353180	01759326
Minnewaukan	Ramsey	199	34.557	1.486	48.151622	-98.757486	3807153260	01759580
Minnie	Grant	63	34.697	0.000	46.415033	-101.860174	3803753300	01037084
Minnie Lake	Barnes	50	36.130	0.010	47.114505	-97.761401	3800353340	01036424
Minto	Cavalier	24	34.916	0.918	48.840919	-98.649878	3801953500	01759371
Mission	Benson	1,087	39.956	4.807	47.985178	-98.834887	3800553580	01759252
Missouri	Burleigh	168	23.634	5.726	46.687767	-100.639813	3801553620	01759341
Missouri Ridge	Williams	496	35.891	0.047	48.241524	-103.668026	3810553660	01759730
Model	Mountrail	61	36.389	0.126	47.990152	-102.055055	3806153700	01037120
Monroe	Towner	29	35.978	0.028	48.755027	-99.447307	3809553900	01759656
Mont	Williams	45	35.905	0.022	48.254477	-103.805015	3810553940	01759731
Montpelier	Stutsman	70	35.820	0.000	46.674156	-98.628860	3809354020	01036443
Montrose	Cavalier	42	35.262	0.051	48.579718	-97.987110	3801954060	01759372
Moon Lake	Stutsman	65	34.345	0.693	46.848858	-98.998545	3809354100	01036460
Moord	Slope	18	35.276	0.041	46.493336	-103.109796	3808754140	01037172
Moore	Ransom	93	35.711	0.000	46.586806	-97.720905	3807354180	01036882
Mooreton	Richland	117	35.136	0.056	46.240774	-96.823456	3807754260	01036829
Moraine	Grand Forks	66	35.872	0.035	47.891762	-97.827283	3803554300	01036614
Moran	Richland	70	32.824	2.721	46.052654	-97.064833	3807754340	01036822
Morgan	Traill	91	35.936	0.000	47.628581	-97.282464	3809754380	01036706
Morris	Ramsey	53	32.975	3.047	48.234316	-98.763196	3807154420	01759581
Morton	Burleigh	42	35.965	0.011	46.670371	-100.385483	3801554460	01759342
Moscow	Cavalier	17	34.993	1.008	48.761779	-98.666598	3801954500	01759373
Mott	Hettinger	60	35.202	0.068	46.421707	-102.370568	3804154660	02397841
Mound	Slope	7	35.794	0.065	46.415294	-103.734627	3808754700	01037167
Mount Carmel	Cavalier	41	44.352	0.681	48.942356	-98.419924	3801954820	01759374
Mount Rose	Bottineau	59	36.008	0.000	48.676125	-101.255384	3800954900	01759284
Mount View	Towner	54	35.281	0.559	48.845538	-99.456956	3809554940	01759657
Mountrail	Mountrail	28	35.841	0.041	47.898432	-101.925721	3806154860	01033976
Mouse River	McHenry	15	31.270	4.696	48.597085	-100.581768	3804954980	01759502
Munster	Eddy	56	35.908	0.165	47.711572	-99.221379	3802755100	01759409
Muskego	Renville	38	31.536	4.529	48.509808	-101.505933	3807555180	01759614
Myrtle	Mountrail	21	36.404	0.118	48.329216	-102.767356	3806155300	01037096
Nansen	Richland	86	35.996	0.000	46.412743	-96.967118	3807755340	01036847
Nash	Nelson	53	35.769	0.277	48.057221	-97.946797	3806355460	01036576
Naughton	Burleigh	158	35.981	0.000	46.939251	-100.644871	3801555540	01037122
Nebo	Bowman	26	35.855	0.029	46.078095	-103.675913	3801155580	01759313
Neche	Pembina	37	49.034	0.025	48.930222	-97.481341	3806755660	01036736
Nedrose	Ward	2,252	31.563	0.681	48.247362	-101.198445	3810155700	01759687
Nekoma	Cavalier	26	35.152	0.465	48.592606	-98.381088	3801955780	02397843
Nelson	Barnes	57	35.978	0.044	46.775819	-98.002992	3800355820	01036410
Nesheim	Nelson	43	35.740	0.072	47.723086	-98.214901	3806355860	01036559
Ness	Pierce	84	36.522	0.221	48.326458	-100.182567	3806955900	01759558
New City	Towner	18	35.686	0.034	48.588019	-99.435275	3809556140	01759658
New England	Hettinger	107	35.584	0.000	46.498888	-102.863047	3804156220	01037229
New Home	Williams	5	35.981	0.013	48.509517	-103.200445	3810556300	01037037
New Prairie	Ward	237	35.980	0.085	48.152796	-101.079000	3810156580	01759688
New Rockford	Eddy	81	34.517	0.225	47.723034	-99.082099	3802756660	02397845
Newborg	Bottineau	43	35.579	0.397	48.671222	-100.983793	3800955940	01759285
Newbre	Ramsey	36	34.074	2.057	48.234711	-98.475995	3807155980	01759582
Newburgh	Steele	90	35.752	0.000	47.628715	-97.536757	3809156060	01036670
Newbury	Stutsman	51	34.618	1.475	46.757273	-99.422883	3809356100	01036465
Newland	Ramsey	26	35.619	0.445	48.412940	-98.383895	3807156380	01759583
Newman	Ward	55	35.878	0.200	47.982737	-101.158511	3810156500	01759689
Newport	McHenry	91	35.731	0.000	48.326607	-100.431899	3804956540	01759503
Niagara	Grand Forks	72	35.158	0.051	47.971139	-97.795313	3803556820	01036615
Noble	Cass	74	31.403	0.000	47.193938	-96.886845	3801757020	01036393
Nogosek	Stutsman	20	35.044	0.468	47.276948	-98.656796	3809357060	01036508
Noltimier	Barnes	65	35.956	0.114	47.023152	-97.896614	3800357140	01036425
Noonan	Ramsey	31	33.786	2.112	48.243169	-98.593544	3807157260	01759585
Nora	LaMoure	71	35.955	0.057	46.419968	-98.715208	3804557300	01036904
Norden	LaMoure	51	35.560	0.051	46.340202	-98.975734	3804557340	01036893
Nordmore	Foster	65	35.541	0.132	47.531957	-98.944256	3803157380	01759428
Norma	Barnes	36	35.672	0.293	46.772107	-97.860867	3800357420	01036408
Normal	McHenry	66	35.644	0.094	48.496325	-100.329798	3804957500	01759504
Norman	Traill	74	35.833	0.000	47.367868	-97.410378	3809757540	01036687
Normania	Benson	44	34.401	1.491	48.231640	-99.255642	3800557580	01759253
Normanna	Cass	333	34.474	0.000	46.674639	-96.988042	3801757620	01036352
North Creel	Ramsey	426	30.081	1.505	48.171139	-98.892019	3807157722	01930432
North Loma	Cavalier	9	18.087	0.150	48.694804	-98.504652	3801958020	01759375
North Olga	Cavalier	39	41.680	0.016	48.855380	-98.030512	3801958060	01759376
North Prairie	McHenry	103	35.829	0.030	48.160147	-100.939776	3804958100	01759505
North Star	Burke	35	39.925	0.544	48.943570	-102.212788	3801358140	01759327
North Viking	Benson	59	35.009	0.152	47.981185	-99.483197	3800558180	01759254
Northfield	Ramsey	27	34.758	0.931	48.497967	-98.641975	3807157780	01759586
Northland	Ransom	52	35.731	0.049	46.581484	-97.959722	3807357900	01036885
Northwest	Dickey	19	32.728	0.535	46.236633	-98.932665	3802158220	01036782
Northwest	Kidder	22	32.796	1.664	47.271528	-100.041340	3804358260	01037157
Northwood	Grand Forks	138	34.524	0.000	47.714443	-97.559499	3803558340	01036589
Norton	Walsh	69	35.709	0.115	48.329140	-97.980997	3809958380	01036530
Norway	Traill	169	35.697	0.000	47.454462	-97.155599	3809758540	01036692
Norway Lake	Wells	46	34.641	0.879	47.810323	-99.479050	3810358580	01759707
Norwich	McHenry	143	35.623	0.096	48.239856	-100.948404	3804958660	01759506
Oak Creek	Bottineau	24	35.445	0.000	48.675399	-100.471642	3800958700	01759286
Oak Valley	Bottineau	52	36.016	0.087	48.777318	-100.511814	3800958860	01759287
Oakhill	Barnes	51	35.414	0.081	46.679076	-98.017963	3800358780	01036402
Oakland	Mountrail	26	35.167	0.785	48.157497	-102.109269	3806158820	01036997
Oakville	Grand Forks	200	35.059	0.047	47.883391	-97.305536	3803558900	01036604
Oakwood	Walsh	228	33.526	0.000	48.412107	-97.339101	3809958980	01036534
Oberon	Benson	67	57.388	0.522	47.925443	-99.244476	3800559060	02397849
Odessa	Hettinger	16	35.766	0.060	46.583226	-102.104455	3804159100	01759459
Odessa	Ramsey	49	37.897	8.314	47.968754	-98.587529	3807159140	01759587
Odin	McHenry	46	34.424	1.722	47.986751	-100.637016	3804959180	01759507
Oliver	Williams	8	35.987	0.024	48.423293	-103.320183	3810559260	01037033
Olivia	McHenry	40	35.874	0.035	47.900358	-100.769959	3804959300	01759508
Olson	Towner	19	35.033	0.954	48.505811	-99.287008	3809559380	01759659
Ontario	Ramsey	72	33.923	1.990	48.163172	-98.601321	3807159460	01759588
Ops	Walsh	63	36.015	0.000	48.238231	-97.578927	3809959540	01036518
Ora	Nelson	69	34.414	0.697	47.722982	-97.946877	3806359580	01036557
Orange	Adams	22	35.802	0.133	46.012558	-102.053893	3800159620	01037214
Oriska	Barnes	65	35.082	0.087	46.935397	-97.752733	3800359700	01036418
Orlien	Ward	47	35.645	0.720	47.985154	-101.796936	3810159740	01036954
Orthell	Williams	12	35.894	0.034	48.495353	-103.728983	3810559860	01759732
Osago	Nelson	31	35.400	0.198	47.800898	-98.328474	3806359900	01036565
Osborn	Mountrail	285	30.296	4.988	47.987208	-102.429987	3806159940	01034001
Osford	Cavalier	47	35.803	0.052	48.585234	-98.115821	3801959980	01759377
Oshkosh	Wells	56	34.747	0.065	47.623026	-99.576942	3810360020	01759708
Osloe	Mountrail	41	35.077	0.903	48.146259	-101.976499	3806160060	01036937
Osnabrock	Cavalier	36	35.505	0.439	48.594234	-98.241946	3801960140	02397851
Ostby	Bottineau	45	35.452	0.027	48.581052	-100.352948	3800960180	01759288
Otis	McLean	41	35.152	0.656	47.799001	-100.896513	3805560260	01759541
Overland	Ramsey	14	35.602	0.400	48.406215	-98.644574	3807160340	01759589
Ovid	LaMoure	46	35.328	0.505	46.318992	-98.107769	3804560420	01036886
Owego	Ransom	21	36.034	0.029	46.509330	-97.319286	3807360460	01036866
Page	Cass	52	35.802	0.022	47.202758	-97.504390	3801760540	01036398
Painted Woods	Burleigh	118	36.323	1.326	47.115568	-100.881204	3801560580	01759343
Palermo	Mountrail	32	33.047	1.162	48.326946	-102.250744	3806160660	01037045
Palmer	Divide	17	35.259	0.623	48.691215	-103.200812	3802360700	01037014
Paradise	Eddy	39	32.983	2.235	47.610726	-98.565277	3802760740	01759410
Paris	Stutsman	23	32.790	3.144	47.131651	-99.153914	3809360780	01036492
Park	Pembina	61	35.909	0.016	48.675832	-97.726149	3806760820	01036719
Parshall	Mountrail	54	35.976	0.046	47.986842	-102.203674	3806160980	01037018
Passport	Ward	46	33.412	3.090	48.333297	-101.862997	3810161060	01036947
Paulson	Towner	30	34.911	1.147	48.586710	-99.168071	3809561140	01759660
Peabody	Bottineau	18	35.600	0.447	48.857266	-100.632237	3800961180	01759289
Peace	Kidder	28	34.019	2.143	46.683942	-99.608740	3804361220	01037059
Peaceful Valley	Slope	19	36.892	0.042	46.587751	-103.235368	3808761260	01037253
Pearl	Golden Valley	8	72.191	0.108	47.247025	-103.881061	3803361340	01759436
Pearl Lake	LaMoure	54	35.271	0.763	46.413375	-98.212381	3804561380	01036896
Pelican	Ramsey	39	25.793	1.000	48.162231	-99.112887	3807161500	01759590
Pembina	Pembina	82	64.478	0.369	48.944133	-97.310196	3806761620	01036735
Perry	Cavalier	45	35.830	0.206	48.688501	-98.378094	3801961740	01759378
Perth	Walsh	52	34.696	1.244	48.243948	-98.089000	3809961820	01036522
Petersburg	Nelson	29	46.258	1.087	47.962079	-97.957505	3806361900	01036568
Peterson	Stutsman	34	34.509	1.738	46.940293	-99.373195	3809361940	01036477
Petersville	Kidder	15	34.012	1.929	47.179948	-99.555396	3804361980	01759475
Pettibone	Kidder	45	32.134	3.621	47.107071	-99.544763	3804362100	02397853
Pickard	Williams	276	35.779	0.061	48.240484	-103.548351	3810562140	01036989
Pickard	Sheridan	28	34.824	1.215	47.464136	-100.622456	3808362180	01759635
Pickering	Bottineau	193	35.557	0.013	48.856489	-100.513696	3800962300	01759290
Picton	Towner	27	44.107	0.221	48.948349	-99.447357	3809562420	01759661
Pierce	Barnes	74	35.173	0.166	47.205307	-98.386921	3800362460	01036440
Pilot Mound	Griggs	41	36.063	0.134	47.636043	-98.181971	3803962580	01036651
Pingree	Stutsman	49	34.959	0.707	47.200177	-98.900819	3809362660	01036502
Pipestem Valley	Stutsman	35	35.609	0.233	47.200594	-99.032869	3809362740	01036503
Plain	Renville	30	35.778	0.352	48.509998	-101.636454	3807562900	01759615
Plainview	Stutsman	40	35.912	0.045	47.102590	-98.900913	3809362940	01036488
Plaza	Mountrail	38	36.174	0.000	47.978371	-101.935687	3806163020	01036941
Pleasant	Cass	468	36.618	0.067	46.666649	-96.858760	3801763100	01036351
Pleasant Hill	Kidder	56	35.446	0.514	46.857568	-100.014189	3804363140	01037071
Pleasant Lake	Benson	74	34.053	2.527	48.332940	-99.775400	3800563200	01759255
Pleasant Prairie	Eddy	32	34.564	0.248	47.623650	-98.936777	3802763220	01759411
Pleasant Valley	Williams	121	36.342	0.000	48.328365	-102.892724	3810563260	01037108
Pleasant View	Grand Forks	138	36.053	0.001	47.807814	-97.444658	3803563300	01036596
Plumer	Divide	11	34.882	1.168	48.756942	-103.388664	3802363340	01759395
Plymouth	Grand Forks	68	36.048	0.062	48.061269	-97.841404	3803563380	01036621
Pomona View	LaMoure	22	35.844	0.122	46.333628	-98.840326	3804563500	01036892
Pontiac	Cass	100	35.120	0.796	46.666003	-97.608769	3801763580	01036357
Pony Gulch	Wells	45	35.107	0.018	47.624935	-99.965853	3810363620	01037151
Poplar Grove	Ramsey	218	16.220	18.824	48.079414	-99.021504	3807163680	01759591
Port Emma	Dickey	35	26.493	0.486	45.986888	-98.204943	3802163820	01036743
Portal	Burke	24	42.578	0.194	48.944977	-102.601028	3801363780	02397856
Porter	Dickey	50	35.272	0.268	46.234041	-98.450557	3802163860	01036773
Potsdam	Dickey	38	34.467	0.042	46.237090	-98.701003	3802163980	01036778
Potter	Barnes	34	32.770	2.787	46.937841	-98.259076	3800364020	01036421
Powers	Mountrail	35	34.406	1.613	48.505884	-102.550760	3806164100	01037092
Powers Lake	Mountrail	54	35.563	0.309	48.496086	-102.689781	3806164180	01037198
Prairie	LaMoure	43	36.121	0.013	46.594439	-98.212048	3804564220	01036911
Prairie Centre	Walsh	107	36.186	0.000	48.325434	-97.578750	3809964270	01036527
Pratt	McHenry	50	35.977	0.022	48.581810	-100.983820	3804964420	01759509
Prescott	Renville	28	35.949	0.073	48.494881	-101.114200	3807564460	01759616
Preston	Ransom	79	35.666	0.039	46.580076	-97.836306	3807364500	01036883
Pretty Rock	Grant	13	35.816	0.007	46.157439	-101.809643	3803764580	01759440
Primrose	Steele	73	35.921	0.000	47.455028	-97.537521	3809164660	01036665
Progress	Wells	20	34.864	0.992	47.363449	-99.703883	3810364700	01037129
Prophets	Sheridan	23	35.485	0.554	47.544841	-100.619840	3808364715	01848620
Prospect	Ramsey	26	35.763	0.227	48.492687	-98.504396	3807164740	01759592
Prosperity	Renville	26	43.394	0.034	48.944315	-101.813831	3807564820	01759617
Pulaski	Walsh	88	34.139	0.338	48.316900	-97.200171	3809964860	01036524
Purcell	Mountrail	58	35.498	0.413	48.247338	-102.353035	3806164900	01037047
Quinby	Kidder	7	29.266	6.693	47.033776	-99.812197	3804364940	01037124
Rainbow	Williams	14	35.737	0.166	48.508952	-103.335170	3810565020	01037038
Rainy Butte	Slope	27	35.852	0.000	46.497503	-102.989024	3808765060	01037171
Raleigh	Grant	37	35.989	0.025	46.314608	-101.366842	3803765140	01037086
Randolph	McKenzie	16	35.737	0.076	47.809353	-103.732982	3805365220	01036967
Raney	LaMoure	24	35.429	0.043	46.500358	-98.975169	3804565260	01036909
Ransom	Sargent	56	35.059	0.145	46.066685	-97.441002	3808165340	01036793
Raritan	Barnes	95	35.971	0.020	46.668803	-97.731796	3800365380	01036400
Rat Lake	Mountrail	21	35.732	0.148	48.146368	-102.623316	3806165420	01037099
Ray	LaMoure	42	35.964	0.001	46.417388	-98.840837	3804565540	01036906
Raymond	Cass	254	34.358	0.074	46.941319	-96.978866	3801765620	01036373
Red Lake	Logan	44	33.574	2.122	46.421933	-99.612752	3804765700	01037204
Redmond	Mountrail	4	33.527	2.449	48.416326	-102.176275	3806165740	01037000
Ree	Ward	21	34.224	1.843	48.417367	-101.908292	3810165820	01036942
Reed	Cass	1,175	20.261	0.113	46.941238	-96.871470	3801765860	01036372
Reeder	Adams	39	35.067	0.162	46.076137	-102.929327	3800165940	01037237
Reno Valley	Pierce	38	34.576	1.379	48.231569	-99.901859	3806966060	01759559
Renville	Bottineau	32	35.888	0.067	48.762778	-101.299299	3800966100	01759291
Rexine	Kidder	4	33.951	1.612	47.263958	-99.561134	3804366220	01759476
Rhame	Bowman	27	29.055	0.115	46.240555	-103.692322	3801166340	01037177
Rice Lake	Ward	65	34.411	1.835	47.986206	-101.540877	3810166420	01036959
Rich	Cass	64	36.098	0.042	47.101343	-97.504512	3801766460	01036390
Rich Valley	Benson	40	35.984	0.077	47.984921	-99.727280	3800566660	01759256
Richburg	Bottineau	37	43.320	2.065	48.944643	-101.027271	3800966540	01759292
Richland	Burke	17	42.591	0.195	48.944965	-102.338448	3801366580	01759328
Richland Center	Slope	5	35.630	0.032	46.501534	-103.633549	3808766620	01037175
Richmond	Burleigh	33	34.997	1.091	47.191295	-100.311233	3801566635	01759344
Rifle	Hettinger	43	35.539	0.016	46.580715	-102.602182	3804166740	01759460
Riga	McHenry	79	34.874	1.510	48.319606	-100.680772	3804966780	01759510
Riggin	Benson	47	46.593	1.280	48.147232	-99.232561	3800566820	01759257
Riverdale	Dickey	95	37.074	0.338	46.059136	-98.080596	3802166940	01036752
Riverside	Steele	41	36.051	0.076	47.383894	-97.911254	3809167100	01036664
Riverview	McKenzie	13	43.859	17.403	48.041557	-102.690915	3805367140	01037197
Robinson	Kidder	36	34.400	1.535	47.115433	-99.795771	3804367220	01037188
Rochester	Cass	53	36.057	0.000	47.196012	-97.642209	3801767260	01036399
Rock	Benson	29	36.118	0.318	47.883704	-99.092935	3800567300	01759258
Rock	Grant	16	35.583	0.000	46.328228	-101.736729	3803767340	01759441
Rock Hill	Burleigh	25	36.110	0.000	47.112946	-100.431781	3801567420	01037144
Rock Island	Williams	0	34.391	0.808	48.597340	-103.461192	3810567460	01037003
Rock Lake	Towner	13	33.407	2.200	48.827519	-99.209533	3809567540	01759662
Rockford	Renville	47	35.940	0.016	48.857653	-101.944933	3807567380	01759618
Rogers	Barnes	42	34.731	0.194	47.117567	-98.140764	3800367660	01036430
Roland	Bottineau	538	38.117	5.825	48.943723	-100.369728	3800967740	01759293
Rolling Green	Ward	85	34.115	1.769	48.143783	-101.580743	3810167860	01036950
Rolling Prairie	Foster	32	35.694	0.273	47.449844	-98.681116	3803167900	01759429
Roloff	McIntosh	12	33.876	0.151	46.244127	-99.065874	3805167940	01037181
Romness	Griggs	36	35.719	0.051	47.540646	-98.038637	3803967980	01036647
Roosevelt	Renville	25	33.627	2.156	48.669386	-101.766535	3807568020	01759619
Roscoe	LaMoure	59	35.910	0.000	46.500192	-98.473722	3804568060	01036901
Rose	Stutsman	73	35.077	0.949	47.020959	-98.529236	3809368100	01036479
Rose Hill	Foster	66	35.100	0.587	47.450107	-98.938534	3803168300	01759430
Rose Hill	McHenry	18	35.809	0.126	48.249283	-100.662680	3804968310	01759511
Rosebud	Barnes	55	34.931	0.077	46.674724	-98.259977	3800368140	01036404
Rosefield	Eddy	33	34.965	0.142	47.619361	-99.192213	3802768180	01759412
Roseglen	McLean	34	35.683	0.276	47.724579	-101.796978	3805568260	01759542
Roseland	Burke	26	35.730	0.184	48.684909	-102.296593	3801368340	01759329
Rosemeade	Ransom	39	36.260	0.021	46.340345	-97.353815	3807368380	01036858
Rosemont	McLean	34	35.790	0.200	47.803478	-101.391448	3805568420	01036995
Rosendal	Griggs	35	34.781	0.482	47.631419	-98.431192	3803968460	01036656
Rosenfield	Sheridan	35	33.814	2.106	47.796631	-100.381931	3808368470	01759636
Roseville	Traill	109	35.553	0.000	47.454410	-97.410400	3809768500	01036696
Ross	Mountrail	44	35.609	0.716	48.334467	-102.493753	3806168580	01037094
Round Lake	McHenry	39	32.532	3.534	48.070972	-100.311724	3804968660	01759512
Round Prairie	Williams	118	50.583	0.013	48.155895	-103.954508	3810568700	01759733
Round Top	Stutsman	9	33.657	2.174	47.108559	-99.024025	3809368740	01036490
Royal	Ramsey	24	34.988	0.995	48.500304	-98.790382	3807168780	01759593
Rubin	Nelson	38	34.042	2.057	48.064637	-98.216960	3806368820	01036578
Rugh	Nelson	26	35.793	0.103	47.807164	-97.945992	3806368900	01036562
Rush Lake	Pierce	40	34.822	1.293	48.428310	-99.705378	3806968980	01759560
Rush River	Cass	82	36.421	0.013	47.025553	-97.144643	3801769020	01036383
Rushford	Walsh	85	36.011	0.000	48.325557	-97.708630	3809968940	01036528
Rushville (inactive)	Ward	81	35.206	0.655	47.887347	-101.293074	3810169060	01036958
Rusland	Wells	38	34.707	0.523	47.625521	-99.837925	3810369100	01759709
Russell	LaMoure	35	35.986	0.011	46.507609	-98.589325	3804569220	01036903
Rutland	Sargent	55	35.415	0.255	46.058666	-97.561019	3808169380	01036794
Ryan	LaMoure	70	35.587	0.286	46.319056	-98.212510	3804569420	01036887
Ryder	Ward	36	34.857	0.651	47.894049	-101.668399	3810169500	01036953
Rye	Grand Forks	297	33.335	0.000	47.978420	-97.174153	3803569540	01036603
Saddle Butte	Golden Valley	25	35.278	0.178	47.021142	-103.976050	3803369580	01037074
Saline	McHenry	24	36.152	0.113	48.422249	-100.874792	3804970340	01759513
Sand Creek	Slope	34	70.850	0.142	46.494140	-103.427739	3808770420	01037174
Sandoun	Ransom	66	36.046	0.000	46.413051	-97.343555	3807370460	01036865
Saratoga	LaMoure	52	36.146	0.042	46.594666	-98.462855	3804570660	01036913
Sargent	Sargent	32	35.883	0.000	46.066125	-97.820711	3808170740	01036796
Sarnia	Nelson	39	34.766	1.236	48.150359	-98.100117	3806370820	01036581
Sauk Prairie	Ward	23	35.813	0.061	48.669986	-101.898137	3810170860	01759690
Sauk Valley	Williams	60	35.573	0.179	48.583714	-102.944265	3810570900	01037006
Sauter	Walsh	37	34.835	1.156	48.245457	-98.217289	3809970940	01036523
Sawyer	Ward	183	35.499	0.053	48.068530	-101.088604	3810171020	02397870
Scandia	Bottineau	46	43.860	0.000	48.946531	-100.774709	3800971060	01759294
Schiller	McHenry	48	35.433	0.998	47.975087	-100.270874	3804971180	01759514
Schrunk	Burleigh	18	32.710	1.723	47.294280	-100.413430	3801571220	01759345
Scorio	Williams	37	34.956	0.827	48.595028	-103.732864	3810571300	01036920
Scotia	Bottineau	50	40.181	1.138	48.944595	-100.895783	3800971340	01759295
Scott	Adams	106	35.837	0.209	45.984305	-102.560385	3800171380	01037219
Scoville	Ransom	35	18.054	0.000	46.391559	-97.469165	3807371460	01036867
Scranton	Bowman	67	34.917	0.088	46.169722	-103.178994	3801171540	02397871
Sealy	Logan	23	36.361	0.161	46.595398	-99.863326	3804771580	01037062
Seivert	Cavalier	15	28.060	1.871	48.578664	-98.901129	3801971620	01759379
Sentinel	Golden Valley	50	143.351	0.288	46.886314	-103.718768	3803371740	01037078
Sergius	Bottineau	51	47.757	0.996	48.842975	-101.005336	3800971820	01759296
Severn	Stutsman	51	35.980	0.182	46.689172	-98.765753	3809371860	01036444
Sharlow	Stutsman	55	36.210	0.042	46.676205	-98.906166	3809371900	01036446
Sharon	Steele	48	33.806	0.035	47.644998	-97.919876	3809171980	01036676
Shealy	Ward	28	35.150	0.821	48.146370	-101.846768	3810172075	01759691
Sheets	Slope	20	35.828	0.110	46.326282	-103.359687	3808772100	01759644
Sheldon	Eddy	22	35.748	0.335	47.708983	-98.964920	3802772140	01759413
Shell	Mountrail	30	35.958	0.012	48.065750	-102.108459	3806172220	01037019
Shell Valley	Rolette	449	35.579	0.536	48.768271	-99.840463	3807972260	01759627
Shenford	Ransom	118	53.662	0.072	46.479115	-97.479102	3807372300	01036868
Shepherd	Walsh	37	34.629	1.511	48.332398	-98.222450	3809972380	01036532
Sherbrooke	Steele	49	35.978	0.000	47.455477	-97.665384	3809172420	01036666
Sheridan	LaMoure	28	34.903	0.122	46.580037	-98.337588	3804572460	01036912
Sherman	Bottineau	68	35.910	0.005	48.842786	-101.289039	3800972500	01759297
Sheyenne	Richland	51	35.645	0.015	46.507680	-97.216016	3807772620	01036852
Short Creek	Burke	37	42.775	0.250	48.943720	-102.734535	3801372740	01759330
Shuman	Sargent	60	34.920	0.732	46.159700	-97.436522	3808172780	01036800
Sibley	Kidder	77	31.643	4.017	46.846047	-99.759078	3804372860	01759477
Sibley Butte	Burleigh	15	35.990	0.011	46.945670	-100.370762	3801572900	01759346
Sibley Trail	Barnes	92	33.955	2.209	47.189377	-98.014591	3800372940	01036437
Sidney	Towner	48	43.977	0.383	48.936230	-99.316611	3809572980	01759663
Sidonia	Mountrail	15	34.636	1.362	48.508408	-102.285181	3806173020	01037119
Sikes	Mountrail	87	35.517	0.465	48.150939	-102.386183	3806173060	01037042
Silver Lake	Wells	21	34.826	1.201	47.401106	-99.836299	3810373140	01037190
Silvesta	Walsh	38	35.154	0.766	48.492537	-98.111696	3809973220	01036550
Sinclair	Stutsman	30	34.196	1.709	46.758025	-99.128339	3809373340	01036461
Sioux	McKenzie	108	64.409	5.729	47.913001	-103.871117	3805373380	01036968
Sioux Trail	Divide	25	35.635	0.207	48.684574	-103.733516	3802373420	01036921
Skandia	Barnes	40	35.170	0.720	46.772308	-98.107668	3800373500	01036412
Smith	Towner	16	43.289	0.675	48.942626	-99.188018	3809573660	01759664
Smoky Butte	Divide	34	35.178	0.767	48.673153	-103.596935	3802373700	01759396
Snow	McLean	80	21.476	13.991	47.626616	-101.250968	3805573780	01759544
Solon	Hettinger	22	35.894	0.073	46.408091	-102.118089	3804173860	01759461
Soo	Burke	24	42.681	0.299	48.943339	-102.472522	3801373900	01759331
Sorenson	Towner	21	35.109	0.657	48.664846	-99.295598	3809573940	01759665
Sorkness	Mountrail	37	35.634	0.499	48.410047	-102.683355	3806173980	01034093
South Cottonwood	Wells	40	35.400	0.496	47.534537	-99.578832	3810374080	01759710
South Dresden	Cavalier	33	35.371	0.542	48.852062	-98.533504	3801974100	01759380
South Fork	Adams	11	36.048	0.000	46.075009	-102.060845	3800174140	01037252
South Meadow	Williams	23	35.713	0.290	48.495364	-103.070698	3810574260	01037036
South Minnewaukan	Ramsey	225	29.093	12.431	48.061632	-98.747857	3807174280	01759594
South Olga	Cavalier	39	35.797	0.081	48.773697	-97.990120	3801974300	01759381
South Valley	Rolette	31	35.947	0.016	48.589896	-100.078572	3807974340	01759628
South Viking	Benson	61	35.604	0.225	47.896714	-99.463428	3800574380	01759259
Southwest	Sargent	18	36.011	0.093	45.963131	-97.967970	3808174460	01036789
Speedwell	Wells	57	35.735	0.324	47.456178	-99.585214	3810374540	01759711
Spencer	Ward	47	34.967	0.979	48.582608	-102.158045	3810174580	01759692
Spiritwood	Stutsman	73	35.759	0.335	46.938920	-98.486954	3809374700	01036467
Spring Coulee	Mountrail	39	35.148	0.109	48.072199	-101.999565	3806174860	01037020
Spring Creek	Barnes	74	35.489	0.029	46.683088	-98.114316	3800374900	01036403
Spring Grove	McHenry	39	32.138	1.836	47.892679	-100.390922	3804975020	01759515
Spring Lake	Ward	29	34.713	1.172	47.885298	-101.422432	3810175060	01036983
Spring Valley	Dickey	28	33.271	2.282	46.077524	-98.922221	3802175140	01037247
Springbrook	Williams	67	34.813	0.252	48.243527	-103.427631	3810574820	01036988
Springer	Ransom	59	35.918	0.050	46.498473	-97.847973	3807374940	01036874
Springfield	Towner	14	34.651	1.417	48.407026	-99.428460	3809574980	01759666
Springvale	Barnes	53	35.897	0.000	46.847493	-97.744735	3800375100	01036407
St. Andrews	Walsh	52	36.344	0.470	48.492269	-97.201899	3809969620	01036543
St. Anna	Wells	18	33.290	1.650	47.624269	-99.703726	3810369660	01759712
St. Croix	Hettinger	34	36.658	0.000	46.500535	-102.486896	3804169820	01759462
St. Joseph	Pembina	94	44.879	0.039	48.946973	-97.749046	3806770020	01036739
St. Mary	McLean	147	33.235	1.771	47.625291	-101.493840	3805570060	01759543
St. Marys	Ward	52	34.895	1.236	48.414360	-101.510871	3810170100	01759693
St. Paul	Stutsman	71	32.222	3.761	46.856115	-99.372706	3809370180	01036466
St. Thomas	Pembina	119	71.919	0.009	48.636672	-97.481240	3806770300	01036713
Stafford	Renville	38	43.360	0.105	48.943921	-101.947035	3807575180	01759620
Stanley	Cass	1218	25.265	0.000	46.753385	-96.842128	3801775340	01036358
Star	Bowman	50	30.501	0.110	46.241673	-103.426389	3801175460	01759314
Starbuck	Bottineau	32	39.253	1.239	48.770143	-100.785741	3800975500	01759298
Stavanger	Traill	110	36.201	0.000	47.628462	-97.026861	3809775700	01036701
Stave	Mountrail	33	33.312	2.744	48.415887	-102.038348	3806175740	01036985
Steiber	Burleigh	25	34.170	0.103	47.283629	-100.547906	3801575820	01037141
Steiner	Hettinger	25	35.031	0.040	46.496252	-102.229655	3804175860	01759463
Sterling	Burleigh	149	35.929	0.000	46.851260	-100.267087	3801575940	01759347
Stevens	Ramsey	67	33.729	1.300	48.064296	-98.614459	3807175980	01759595
Stewart	Barnes	89	36.145	0.000	47.023213	-98.149960	3800376020	01036429
Stewart	Kidder	28	33.269	1.374	47.283990	-99.909908	3804376060	01037161
Stillwater	Bowman	28	30.591	0.009	46.244238	-103.178716	3801176140	01759315
Stirton	Stutsman	70	32.891	2.979	46.844756	-99.110856	3809376180	01036462
Stone Creek	Bottineau	19	27.845	0.403	48.681264	-100.733729	3800976260	01759299
Stoneview	Divide	22	35.269	0.502	48.677217	-102.950521	3802376300	01759397
Stony Creek	Williams	558	50.382	12.910	48.081934	-103.526019	3810576340	01036987
Storlie	Cavalier	21	25.095	0.347	48.579867	-98.633664	3801976380	01759382
Strabane	Grand Forks	98	35.548	0.013	48.144065	-97.568357	3803576420	01036625
Strandahl	Williams	20	32.526	0.175	48.422811	-103.978227	3810576460	01759734
Strassburg	Sheridan	34	32.351	3.611	47.811440	-100.514116	3808376540	01759637
Streeter	Stutsman	55	34.798	0.956	46.675077	-99.396456	3809376660	01036450
Strege	McHenry	40	35.266	0.925	47.980053	-100.388593	3804976700	01759516
Strehlow	Hettinger	29	35.883	0.073	46.407370	-102.857648	3804176740	01037231
Strong	Stutsman	19	33.727	1.884	47.090186	-99.286234	3809376780	01036494
Sullivan	Ramsey	26	35.529	0.545	48.420702	-98.778641	3807176860	01759596
Summit	Richland	217	53.361	0.019	46.145643	-96.667743	3807776940	01036825
Sundre	Ward	970	35.716	0.244	48.148714	-101.207121	3810176980	01036990
Sunny Slope	Bowman	9	51.122	0.108	46.160592	-103.956408	3801177060	01037164
Superior	Eddy	55	34.728	0.269	47.629769	-99.068069	3802777140	01759414
Surrey	Ward	349	35.019	0.043	48.241646	-101.066882	3810177220	02397878
Svea	Barnes	41	35.875	0.000	46.761711	-98.248932	3800377300	01036414
Sverdrup	Griggs	92	36.010	0.036	47.377790	-98.065074	3803977340	01036630
Swede	LaMoure	36	35.717	0.063	46.420627	-98.964670	3804577380	01036908
Sydna	Ransom	194	36.327	0.005	46.329653	-97.458880	3807377540	01036859
Sydney	Stutsman	78	36.132	0.123	46.754405	-98.744074	3809377620	01036455
Sykeston	Wells	43	34.922	0.511	47.453995	-99.463343	3810377700	02397880
Tacoma	Bottineau	61	39.385	2.644	48.668771	-100.852516	3800977740	01759300
Taft	Burleigh	32	35.809	0.142	46.771542	-100.258025	3801577780	01037068
Talbot	Bowman	104	35.822	0.030	46.166803	-103.304095	3801177900	01037226
Tanner	Kidder	26	34.098	2.246	46.758863	-99.506850	3804377940	01037057
Tappen	Kidder	91	34.677	0.237	46.841224	-99.647480	3804378020	02397881
Tatman	Ward	2,992	35.922	0.155	48.418099	-101.249373	3810178100	01759694
Taylor	Sargent	39	36.030	0.196	45.979191	-97.696346	3808178140	01036786
Taylor Butte	Adams	14	35.893	0.006	46.169023	-102.559886	3800178220	01037209
Teddy	Towner	36	35.847	0.241	48.747117	-99.077078	3809578260	01759667
Telfer	Burleigh	74	36.016	0.062	46.685192	-100.500785	3801578300	01759348
Tepee Butte	Hettinger	39	35.799	0.008	46.415037	-102.735539	3804178460	01037233
Tewaukon	Sargent	54	37.499	1.536	45.976518	-97.426205	3808178500	01036784
Thelma	Burleigh	17	34.163	1.942	46.746480	-100.111760	3801578580	01037070
Thingvalla	Pembina	101	36.032	0.009	48.677597	-97.848487	3806778620	01036722
Thordenskjold	Barnes	67	35.623	0.005	46.668028	-97.874181	3800378700	01036401
Thorson	Burke	26	35.552	0.355	48.691017	-102.790846	3801378780	01037112
Tiber	Walsh	72	35.805	0.093	48.503371	-97.981576	3809978820	01036549
Tiffany	Eddy	31	35.940	0.185	47.715191	-98.848133	3802778860	01759415
Tioga	Williams	104	34.437	0.151	48.423224	-102.961858	3810578980	01037030
Tolgen	Ward	29	33.679	2.213	48.149479	-101.724985	3810179100	01036984
Torgerson	Pierce	62	33.181	2.255	48.425558	-99.924452	3806979220	01759561
Torning	Ward	64	34.401	1.783	48.071326	-101.482912	3810179260	01036955
Tower	Cass	54	34.556	0.003	46.941938	-97.608616	3801779300	01036378
Trenton	Williams	541	30.527	1.956	48.071095	-103.805216	3810579500	01036977
Tri	McKenzie	104	113.817	10.990	48.016174	-103.665710	3805379520	01954181
Trier	Cavalier	50	30.346	1.924	48.681579	-98.895032	3801979540	01759383
Triumph	Ramsey	38	36.106	0.493	48.332618	-98.497709	3807179580	01759597
Troy	Divide	45	34.379	1.584	48.858036	-103.388573	3802379660	01036927
Truax	Williams	190	49.301	7.797	48.122220	-103.283768	3810579740	01036979
Truman	Pierce	54	35.360	0.457	47.898085	-99.994799	3806979780	01759562
Trygg	Burleigh	40	36.028	0.000	47.025735	-100.431786	3801579820	01037132
Tuller	Ransom	107	36.008	0.010	46.507330	-97.710566	3807379860	01036872
Turtle Lake	McLean	43	33.978	1.982	47.548602	-100.985957	3805579980	02397883
Turtle River	Grand Forks	174	33.291	0.272	48.142938	-97.202245	3803580060	01036622
Tuscarora	Pierce	62	34.634	1.241	48.239469	-100.031162	3806980100	01759563
Tuttle	Kidder	39	34.480	1.013	47.105200	-100.051684	3804380180	01037159
Twelve Mile	Williams	74	62.235	7.737	48.121003	-103.422014	3810580220	01036998
Twin Butte	Divide	18	34.690	1.361	48.851599	-103.530568	3802380260	01759398
Twin Hill	Towner	39	34.908	0.901	48.681853	-99.032808	3809580340	01759668
Twin Lake	Benson	39	33.869	2.113	48.239127	-99.663851	3800580380	01759260
Twin Tree	Benson	143	36.341	0.213	47.897400	-98.979574	3800580420	01759261
Twin Valley	McKenzie	114	79.127	19.604	48.045233	-103.184756	3805380460	01036972
Tyrol	Griggs	116	36.673	0.191	47.530487	-98.186907	3803980580	01036650
Tyrone	Williams	33	36.326	0.006	48.326656	-103.677950	3810580620	01759735
Union	Grand Forks	194	35.932	0.020	47.709336	-97.291191	3803580740	01036587
Upland	Divide	21	35.123	0.928	48.770929	-103.136790	3802380900	01037011
Uxbridge	Barnes	89	35.128	0.791	47.113638	-98.393826	3800380980	01036434
Vale	Burke	24	34.764	0.959	48.853051	-102.603806	3801381020	01759332
Valhalla	Wells	20	35.453	0.530	47.792532	-99.329347	3810381060	01759713
Valley	Barnes	536	32.648	0.036	46.956573	-97.960032	3800381080	01759736
Valley	Dickey	30	35.334	0.000	46.240808	-98.566351	3802181100	01036775
Valley	Kidder	25	34.667	1.334	46.756094	-99.644635	3804381140	01037058
Valley Spring	Stutsman	19	33.799	2.215	47.023360	-99.143116	3809381260	01036491
Van Buren	Renville	46	36.016	0.041	48.504235	-101.384630	3807581300	01759621
Van Hook	Mountrail	105	32.895	3.555	47.981040	-102.318754	3806181420	01037116
Van Meter	Dickey	77	36.080	0.000	45.980135	-98.444062	3802181460	01036745
Vang	Ward	40	34.280	1.660	48.058654	-101.609830	3810181380	01036951
Vanville	Burke	20	33.398	2.372	48.595587	-102.418155	3801381500	01037091
Velva	McHenry	182	35.025	0.100	48.072936	-100.951186	3804981660	02397887
Verner	Sargent	42	35.381	0.394	46.145991	-97.935000	3808181780	01036811
Vernon	Kidder	26	29.984	6.049	46.935385	-99.742727	3804381820	01759478
Vernon	Walsh	88	36.075	0.000	48.325551	-97.838317	3809981860	01036529
Vesta	Walsh	31	35.860	0.177	48.409812	-97.981930	3809981980	01036540
Victor	Towner	25	34.825	0.778	48.579968	-99.038848	3809582020	01759669
Victoria	McLean	36	31.162	4.789	47.537282	-101.258207	3805582060	01759545
View	Williams	32	35.797	0.047	48.236279	-103.159467	3810582100	01037025
Viking	Richland	67	36.123	0.000	46.499870	-97.093063	3807782140	01036850
Viking	Traill	169	34.832	0.000	47.542492	-97.410786	3809782180	01036708
Villard	McHenry	15	35.747	0.262	48.145470	-100.550546	3804982220	01759517
Virginia	Towner	15	34.971	0.729	48.754785	-99.186072	3809582300	01759670
Vivian	Sargent	140	35.099	0.489	46.236434	-97.830050	3808182340	01036809
Voltaire	McHenry	32	35.051	0.384	47.971298	-100.768335	3804982420	02397889
Wadsworth	Stutsman	22	32.675	2.929	47.203464	-99.280246	3809382540	01036505
Wagar	McHenry	30	36.009	0.064	48.421965	-100.592116	3804982580	01759518
Wagendorf	Hettinger	17	35.963	0.009	46.318359	-102.726679	3804182620	01037234
Walburg	Cass	152	35.978	0.005	46.766696	-97.361976	3801782740	01036366
Walcott	Richland	326	58.738	0.000	46.587329	-96.927146	3807782820	01036854
Waldo	Richland	103	35.309	0.041	46.064337	-96.813795	3807782900	01036819
Walhalla	Pembina	130	44.170	0.048	48.931954	-97.887029	3806783020	01036740
Walker	Hettinger	22	36.070	0.045	46.505321	-102.092723	3804183060	01759464
Wallace	Kidder	25	34.131	1.442	47.273773	-99.666855	3804383100	01037126
Walle	Grand Forks	457	38.715	0.197	47.795145	-97.034086	3803583140	01036592
Walsh Centre	Walsh	154	36.217	0.000	48.325376	-97.448678	3809983180	01036526
Walshville	Walsh	112	33.096	0.438	48.245458	-97.193551	3809983220	01036515
Walters	Stutsman	44	35.474	0.136	47.276592	-99.033007	3809383260	01036511
Wamduska	Nelson	34	31.087	4.757	47.890761	-98.332020	3806383340	01036572
Wano	LaMoure	35	36.035	0.000	46.413392	-98.599342	3804583380	01036902
Ward	Burke	52	35.040	0.957	48.756433	-102.338767	3801383420	01037103
Warren	Cass	139	35.651	0.002	46.753842	-97.000020	3801783500	01036360
Warwick	Benson	64	32.961	2.094	47.888546	-98.732324	3800583620	02397892
Washburn	Griggs	68	35.863	0.026	47.449380	-98.031371	3803983660	01036642
Washington	Grand Forks	116	36.037	0.000	47.715518	-97.431322	3803583740	01036588
Waterford	Ward	2,807	35.823	0.317	48.416292	-101.385910	3810183780	01759695
Waterloo	Cavalier	36	35.342	0.634	48.754141	-98.529629	3801983820	01759384
Watson	Cass	93	35.986	0.000	46.672866	-97.367221	3801783940	01036355
Wayne	Bottineau	32	43.523	0.287	48.944202	-101.157711	3800983980	01759301
Wayzetta	Mountrail	21	35.902	0.064	48.072278	-102.234712	3806184020	01037015
Weber	Sargent	73	39.727	0.543	45.974268	-97.565615	3808184100	01036785
Webster	Ramsey	67	36.066	0.415	48.327072	-98.875909	3807184180	01759598
Weimer	Barnes	47	36.027	0.000	47.022258	-97.769315	3800384220	01036423
Weiser	Kidder	34	34.860	1.058	47.030934	-99.534051	3804384260	01759479
Weld	Stutsman	31	33.947	2.375	46.942433	-99.120691	3809384300	01036475
Wellington	Bottineau	30	35.991	0.080	48.581299	-100.200318	3800984340	01759302
Wells	Wells	100	33.633	0.579	47.811111	-99.855168	3810384380	01759714
West Antelope	Benson	21	35.803	0.104	47.883003	-99.350987	3800584540	01759262
West Bank	Williams	52	36.572	0.000	48.328326	-103.022257	3810584580	01037024
West Bay	Benson	57	35.288	0.209	48.056183	-99.267307	3800584620	01759263
West End	Richland	39	36.118	0.000	46.325901	-97.217980	3807784700	01036845
West Hope	Cavalier	45	44.392	0.591	48.942276	-98.277482	3801985060	01759385
West Norway	Wells	35	35.827	0.174	47.709463	-99.624357	3810385100	01759715
West Ontario	Wells	32	35.397	0.343	47.537424	-99.703496	3810385120	01759716
Westby	Divide	51	48.214	3.652	48.845524	-103.974973	3802384660	01036933
Western	Wells	87	35.562	0.412	47.709665	-99.994802	3810384740	01759717
Westfield	Steele	59	35.376	0.023	47.622409	-97.782210	3809184940	01036674
Westford	Kidder	27	33.399	2.738	46.940193	-99.625830	3804384980	01759480
Wheatfield	Grand Forks	74	36.137	0.000	48.064295	-97.579215	3803585140	01036619
Wheatland	Cass	158	36.112	0.005	46.941323	-97.377064	3801785220	01036376
Wheaton	Bottineau	56	43.366	0.264	48.944197	-101.420498	3800985260	01759303
Wheelock	Williams	72	36.029	0.010	48.330968	-103.269025	3810585340	02397899
Whitby	Bottineau	8	36.266	0.000	48.762966	-100.643011	3800985420	01759304
White	Pierce	49	34.588	1.268	47.898236	-100.130012	3806985460	01759564
White Ash	Renville	34	35.799	0.000	48.503099	-101.777545	3807585500	01759622
White Earth	Mountrail	58	34.330	0.075	48.416845	-102.822068	3806185580	01037109
White Lake	Slope	23	35.580	0.277	46.500229	-103.236280	3808785620	01037173
Whitestone	Dickey	29	36.170	0.351	46.162997	-98.813989	3802185700	01036779
Whitestone Hill	Sargent	85	33.224	0.077	46.240229	-97.705577	3808185740	01036807
Whiting	Bowman	33	35.873	0.070	46.078936	-103.177718	3801185780	01759316
Whitteron	Bottineau	405	34.655	0.473	48.853241	-100.376882	3800985860	01759305
Wild Rose	Burleigh	19	31.720	4.293	46.669303	-100.133889	3801585980	01037066
Willey	Sargent	100	35.499	0.137	46.234674	-97.579921	3808186060	01036804
Williams	Kidder	15	33.808	2.427	46.929192	-99.489851	3804386100	01759481
Williams	Nelson	48	35.675	0.677	47.983539	-98.193716	3806386140	01036571
Willis	Ward	106	36.056	0.021	48.061166	-101.196043	3810186180	01036991
Williston	Williams	1,307	21.756	4.677	48.161101	-103.690266	3810586260	01036975
Willow	Griggs	53	34.517	0.594	47.630636	-98.308241	3803986300	01036654
Willow Creek	McHenry	39	36.237	0.113	48.595491	-100.461354	3804986420	01759519
Willow Lake	Steele	56	34.444	0.501	47.276038	-97.878709	3809186460	01036663
Willow Vale	Bottineau	26	35.899	0.209	48.681424	-100.353066	3800986500	01759306
Willowbank	LaMoure	135	36.088	0.029	46.332150	-98.590334	3804586340	01037206
Wilson	Burleigh	40	33.673	0.820	47.277051	-100.695018	3801586540	01037135
Windsor	Stutsman	59	34.210	0.741	46.933546	-99.005325	3809386700	01036473
Winfield	Stutsman	83	36.066	0.094	46.841434	-98.491992	3809386740	01036452
Wing	Burleigh	27	35.419	0.015	47.119442	-100.325699	3801586820	01037145
Winner	Williams	24	35.825	0.216	48.496092	-103.591502	3810586860	01037005
Winona	Grant	41	40.327	0.076	46.062384	-101.576925	3803786900	01759443
Wise	McLean	37	33.383	2.530	47.539375	-100.745653	3805586940	01759546
Wiser	Cass	88	33.685	0.000	47.106594	-96.882803	3801786980	01036380
Wold	Traill	100	35.853	0.000	47.541414	-97.155672	3809787100	01036703
Wolf Butte	Adams	25	35.894	0.051	46.170011	-102.824832	3800187140	01037202
Wood Lake	Benson	522	34.790	1.220	47.888710	-98.826791	3800587420	01759264
Woodberry	Slope	31	35.916	0.000	46.323326	-103.112759	3808787340	01759645
Woodbury	Stutsman	208	34.682	0.161	46.841161	-98.765722	3809387380	01036456
Woodlawn	Kidder	94	34.663	0.143	46.843157	-99.879619	3804387460	01759482
Woodward	Wells	22	35.692	0.273	47.536618	-99.319228	3810387540	01759718
Wright	Dickey	50	35.293	0.201	46.233203	-98.305303	3802187620	01036769
Writing Rock	Divide	7	35.129	1.012	48.773942	-103.795675	3802387660	01036919
Wyard	Foster	63	34.594	0.741	47.450780	-99.213466	3803187700	01759431
Wyndmere	Richland	82	35.473	0.000	46.238705	-97.197666	3807787780	01036837
Yellowstone	McKenzie	417	40.198	2.136	47.895843	-103.997037	3805387820	01759523
York	Benson	27	36.028	0.273	48.324845	-99.533482	3800587900	02397901
Yorktown	Dickey	50	35.804	0.000	46.153339	-98.316833	3802187940	01036768
Young	Dickey	35	34.347	0.074	46.230278	-98.834821	3802187980	01036780
Ypsilanti	Stutsman	128	36.026	0.000	46.761455	-98.502295	3809388060	01036451
Zion	Towner	50	35.910	0.119	48.493801	-99.418093	3809588220	01759671

== Former townships ==
=== 2000 census ===
Townships included in the 2000 census which no longest exist:

Township	County	Pop. (2000)	Land (sq mi)	Water (sq mi)	Latitude	Longitude	FIPS code	GNIS ID	Notes
Bryant	Logan	78	34.436	0.014	46.496600	-99.735648	3804709980	1037053	merged into West Logan UT
Dixon	Logan	17	35.764	0.102	46.510035	-99.601664	3804719740	1037052	became Dixon UT, then merged into West Logan UT
Elmwood	Golden Valley	9	35.643	0.000	47.119653	-103.964660	3803323860	1759434	became Elmwood UT
Starkey	Logan	44	36.105	0.000	46.414434	-99.738411	3804775540	1037194	merged into West Logan UT

== Duplicated names ==
Townships with the same name in different counties:

1	Alexander (Pierce County)	Alexander (Stutsman County)	
2	Banner (Cavalier County)	Banner (Mountrail County)	
3	Berlin (Cass County)	Berlin (Sheridan County)	Berlin (Wells County)
4	Big Bend (Mountrail County)	Big Bend (Ransom County)	
5	Campbell (Emmons County)	Campbell (Hettinger County)	
6	Clear Lake (Burleigh County)	Clear Lake (Kidder County)	
7	East Fork (Benson County)	East Fork (Williams County)	
8	Elm (Dickey County)	Elm (Grant County)	
9	Fertile (Mountrail County)	Fertile (Walsh County)	
10	Greenfield (Griggs County)	Greenfield (Traill County)	
11	Hamburg (Dickey County)	Hamburg (Wells County)	
12	Hawkeye (Divide County)	Hawkeye (McKenzie County)	
13	Highland (Cass County)	Highland (Hettinger County)	Highland (Sheridan County)
14	Hillsdale (Eddy County)	Hillsdale (Wells County)	
15	Hope (Cavalier County)	Hope (Ramsey County)	
16	Lake Williams (Kidder County)	Lake Williams (McLean County)	
17	Liberty (Mountrail County)	Liberty (Ransom County)	
18	Martin (Sheridan County)	Martin (Walsh County)	
19	Michigan (Grand Forks County)	Michigan (Nelson County)	
20	Northwest (Dickey County)	Northwest (Kidder County)	
21	Odessa (Hettinger County)	Odessa (Ramsey County)	
22	Rock (Benson County)	Rock (Grant County)	
23	Rose Hill (Foster County)	Rose Hill (McHenry County)	
24	Stewart (Barnes County)	Stewart (Kidder County)	
25	Valley (Barnes County)	Valley (Dickey County)	Valley (Kidder County)
26	Vernon (Kidder County)	Vernon (Walsh County)	
27	Viking (Richland County)	Viking (Traill County)	
28	Williams (Kidder County)	Williams (Nelson County)	

== See also ==
- List of townships in North Dakota by county
- List of counties in North Dakota
- List of cities in North Dakota
- Category:Defunct townships in North Dakota
