= Prosper, North Dakota =

Community in North Dakota, US

- Unincorporated community
- Location within North Dakota Location within the United States
- Coordinates: 46°57′47″N 97°01′11″W
- Country: United States
- State: North Dakota
- County: Cass
- Township: Raymond
- Founded: 1911
- Elevation: 902 ft (275 m)
- Time zone: UTC-6 (Central (CST))
  - Summer (DST): UTC-5 (CDT)
- Area code: 701
- GNIS feature ID: 1030817

Prosper is an unincorporated community in Cass County, in the U.S. state of North Dakota.

== History ==
Prosper had its start in 1911 when the railroad was extended to that point. A post office was established at Prosper in 1913, and remained in operation until 1968.
