= Logan Center, North Dakota =

- Unincorporated community
- Location within North Dakota
- Coordinates: 47°48′10″N 97°49′04″W
- Country: United States
- State: North Dakota
- County: Grand Forks
- Township: Logan Center
- Founded: 1886
- Named for: John A. Logan
- Elevation: 1,424 ft (434 m)
- Time zone: UTC-6 (Central (CST))
  - Summer (DST): UTC-5 (CDT)
- ZIP code: 58267 (Northwood)
- Area code: 701
- GNIS feature ID: 1029959

Logan Center is an unincorporated community in Logan Center Township, Grand Forks County, North Dakota, United States.

== Etymology ==
Logan Center was named after American Civil War general John A. Logan by settler W. P. Wilson. The word "center" was added to the townsite's name because of its equidistance from Northwood, Larimore, Niagara, and Aneta.

== History ==
Logan Center was established in 1886.

The settlement opened a post office in 1893 under the name Fergua; it closed in 1919.
