= Powell, North Dakota =

- Unincorporated community
- Location within North Dakota
- Coordinates: 47°55′11″N 97°10′40″W
- Country: United States
- State: North Dakota
- County: Grand Forks
- Township: Brenna
- Founded: 1907
- Named for: Arthur D. Powell
- Elevation: 846 ft (258 m)

Population (1920)
  - Total: 10
- Time zone: UTC-6 (Central (CST))
  - Summer (DST): UTC-5 (CDT)
- ZIP code: 58203 (Grand Forks)
- Area code: 701
- GNIS feature ID: 1033789

Powell is an unincorporated community in Brenna Township, Grand Forks County, North Dakota, United States. There was a reported population of 10 as of the 1920 census.

== History ==
Powell was founded in 1907 as a loading station for the Georgia Northeastern Railroad. The community was named after Arthur D. Powell, a brakeman killed in an accident in 1906.
