= Wogansport, North Dakota =

- Unincorporated community
- Location within North Dakota
- Coordinates: 47°02′05″N 100°52′27″W
- Country: United States
- State: North Dakota
- County: Burleigh
- Township: Glenview
- Elevation: 1,742 ft (531 m)
- Time zone: UTC-6 (Central (CST))
  - Summer (DST): UTC-5 (CDT)
- Area code: 701
- GNIS feature ID: 1033928

Wogansport is an unincorporated community in Glenview Township, Burleigh County, North Dakota, United States.

== History ==
Wogansport was founded as a port on the Missouri River in the late 19th century.

A post office was established on March 3, 1882, by Henry P. Wogan. It closed on May 30, 1915.
