= Orr, North Dakota =

- Unincorporated community
- Location within North Dakota
- Coordinates: 48°05′36″N 97°40′32″W
- Country: United States
- State: North Dakota
- County: Grand Forks
- Township: Agnes
- Established: 1882
- Named for: John C. Orr
- Elevation: 1,099 ft (335 m)
- Time zone: UTC-6 (Central (CST))
  - Summer (DST): UTC-5 (CDT)
- ZIP code: 58244 (Inkster)
- Area code: 701
- GNIS feature ID: 1030579

Orr is an unincorporated community in northeastern Agnes Township, Grand Forks County, North Dakota, United States.

== History ==
Orr was founded as a station for the Great Northern Railroad in 1882. In 1885, a post office was established with John C. Orr as its postmaster, hence the settlement's name.

The village reached a peak of about 150 residents in 1920 and declined to just 65 by 1960. In 1972, the post office was permanently closed.
