= Reed Township =

Reed Township may refer to:

- Reed Township, Washington County, Arkansas
- Reed Township, Will County, Illinois
- Reed Township, Cass County, North Dakota, in Cass County, North Dakota
- Reed Township, Seneca County, Ohio
- Reed Township, Pennsylvania

== See also ==
- Read Township (disambiguation)
