= Reed Township, Cass County, North Dakota =

Township in North Dakota, US

Reed Township, North Dakota
- Township
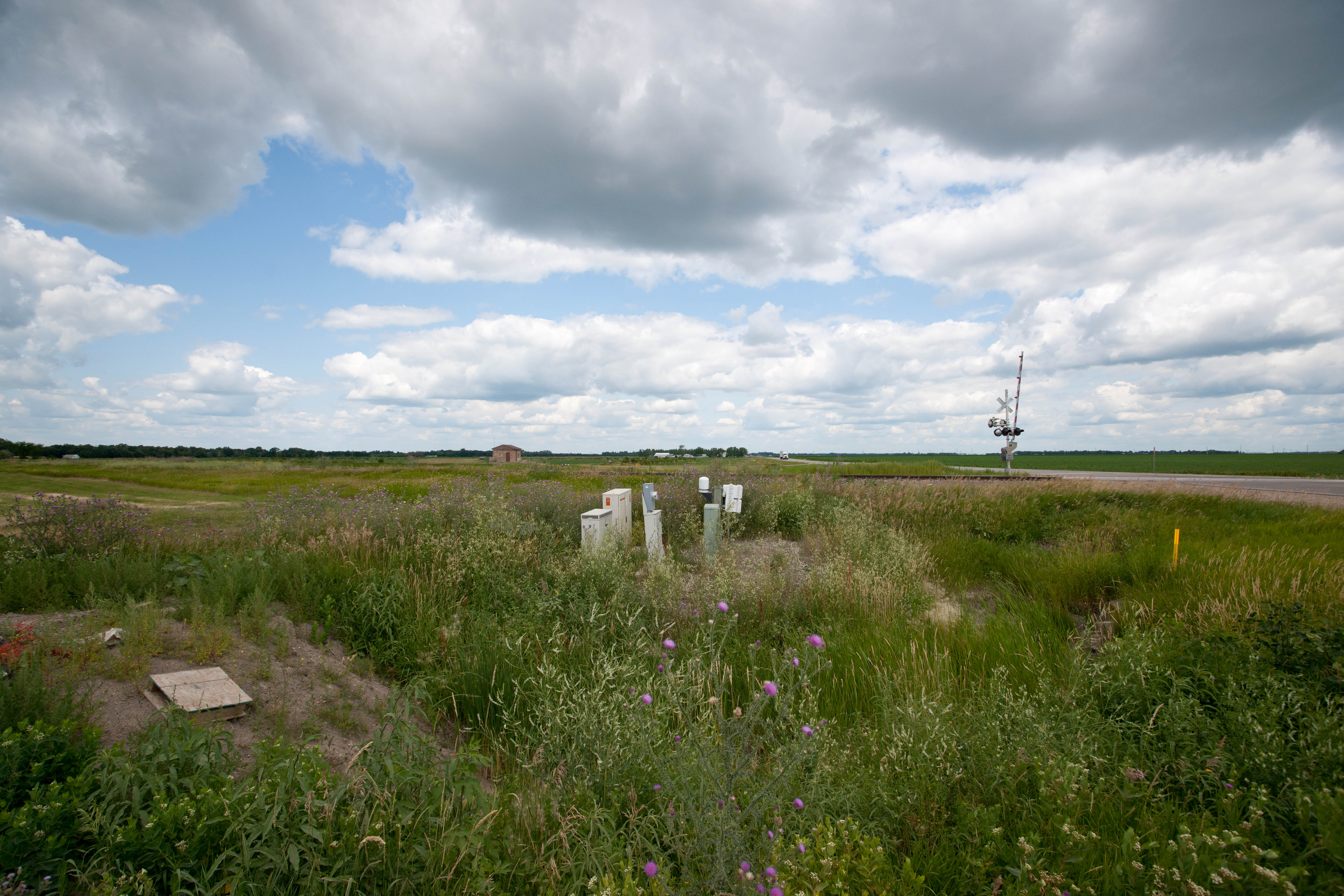
- Pinkham, North Dakota

- Location of Reed Township within Cass County

- Location within North Dakota
- Coordinates: 46°56′06″N 96°53′23″W
- Country: United States
- State: North Dakota
- County: Cass

Government
  - Chairman: Mark McAllister
  - Clerk: Margaret Lonski
  - Treasurer: Julie Nellermoe

Area
  - Total: 19.49 sq mi (50.49 km^{2})
  - Land: 19.38 sq mi (50.20 km^{2})
  - Water: 0.11 sq mi (0.29 km^{2})
- Elevation: 892 ft (272 m)

Population (2020)
  - Total: 1,056
  - Density: 54.48/sq mi (21.04/km^{2})
- Time zone: UTC-6 (Central (CST))
  - Summer (DST): UTC-5 (CDT)
- ZIP codes: 58042 (Harwood); 58078 (West Fargo); 58102 (Fargo)
- Area code: 701
- FIPS code: 38-65860
- GNIS feature ID: 1036372

Reed Township is a township in Cass County, North Dakota, United States. The population was 1,056 at the 2020 census.

== History ==
Reed Township was named after A. L. Reed, a local pioneer settler. A settlement, also called Reed, was established in 1912 as a siding for the Georgia Northeastern Railroad. In 1930, the name was changed to Pinkham for N. B. Pinkham, an American Civil War veteran from Maine who became a prominent local figure as an attorney and state senator.

== Geography ==
As of the 2020 census, Reed Township has a total area of 19.495 square miles (50.49 km^{2}), of which 19.384 square miles (50.20 km^{2}) is land and 0.111 square miles (0.29 km^{2}) is water. The Sheyenne River runs through the township's western portion.

=== Adjacent townships ===
==== North Dakota ====
- Harwood Township (north)
- Fargo Township (east)
- Raymond Township (west)

==== Minnesota ====
- Oakport Township, Clay County (east)

=== Major highways ===
- Interstate 29
- U.S. Highway 81

== Demographics ==
Historical population
Census	Pop.	Note	%±
1890	337		—
1900	391		16.0%
1910	364		−6.9%
1920	319		−12.4%
1930	352		10.3%
1940	343		−2.6%
1950	799		132.9%
1960	1,373		71.8%
1970	655		−52.3%
1980	848		29.5%
1990	1,046		23.3%
2000	1,224		17.0%
2010	1,175		−4.0%
2020	1,056		−10.1%

As of the 2024 American Community Survey, there were an estimated 394 households with a margin of error of 101. A plurality of the population has German ancestry.
