= Clear Lake Township, Burleigh County, North Dakota =

Clear Lake Township, North Dakota
- Township
- Location within North Dakota
- Coordinates: 46°56′16″N 100°08′22″W
- Country: United States
- State: North Dakota
- County: Burleigh

Area
  - Total: 36.10 sq mi (93.50 km^{2})
  - Land: 35.91 sq mi (93.00 km^{2})
  - Water: 0.20 sq mi (0.51 km^{2})
- Elevation: 1,893 ft (577 m)

Population (2020)
  - Total: 31
  - Density: 0.86/sq mi (0.33/km^{2})
- Time zone: UTC-6 (Central (CST))
  - Summer (DST): UTC-5 (CDT)
- Area code: 701
- FIPS code: 38-14380
- GNIS feature ID: 1759336

Clear Lake Township is a township in Burleigh County, North Dakota, United States. The population was 31 at the 2020 census.

== Geography ==
Clear Lake Township has a total area of 36.101 square miles (93.50 km^{2}), of which 35.906 square miles (93.00 km^{2}) is land and 0.195 square miles (0.51 km^{2}) is water.

== Demographics ==
As of the 2023 American Community Survey, there were an estimated 12 households.
