= Alex Township, McKenzie County, North Dakota =

Township in North Dakota, United States

Coordinates: 47°48′02″N 103°35′40″W

Alex Township is a township in McKenzie County, North Dakota. The population is 58.
