= Agnes Township, Grand Forks County, North Dakota =

Agnes Township, North Dakota
- Township
- Location within the state of North Dakota
- Coordinates: 48°3′25″N 97°42′12″W
- Country: United States
- State: North Dakota
- County: Grand Forks

Area
  - Total: 36.12 sq mi (93.55 km^{2})
  - Land: 36.12 sq mi (93.55 km^{2})
  - Water: 0 sq mi (0.00 km^{2})
- Elevation: 1,125 ft (343 m)

Population (2020)
  - Total: 66
  - Density: 1.8/sq mi (0.71/km^{2})
- Time zone: UTC-6 (Central (CST))
  - Summer (DST): UTC-5 (CDT)
- ZIP codes: 58244 (Inkster); 58251 (Larimore); 58266 (Niagara)
- Area code: 701
- FIPS code: 38-00820
- GNIS feature ID: 1036620

Agnes Township is a township in Grand Forks County, North Dakota, United States. It has 66 people and an estimated 12 households.

Historical population
Census	Pop.	Note	%±
1890	284		—
1900	385		35.6%
1910	363		−5.7%
1920	432		19.0%
1930	278		−35.6%
1940	285		2.5%
1950	200		−29.8%
1960	173		−13.5%
1970	144		−16.8%
1980	121		−16.0%
1990	94		−22.3%
2000	83		−11.7%
2010	72		−13.3%
2020	66		−8.3%
U.S. Decennial Census

The unincorporated community of Orr is located within the township.
