= Glenview Township, North Dakota =

- Township
- Location within North Dakota
- Coordinates: 47°01′35″N 100°48′51″W
- Country: United States
- State: North Dakota
- County: Burleigh

Area
  - Total: 39.35 sq mi (101.92 km^{2})
  - Land: 38.73 sq mi (100.31 km^{2})
  - Water: 0.62 sq mi (1.61 km^{2})
- Elevation: 2,070 ft (630 m)

Population (2020)
  - Total: 220
  - Density: 5.7/sq mi (2.2/km^{2})
- Time zone: UTC-6 (Central (CST))
  - Summer (DST): UTC-5 (CDT)
- Area code: 701
- FIPS code: 38-30900
- GNIS feature ID: 1037255

Glenview Township is a township in Burleigh County, North Dakota, United States. The population was 220 at the 2020 census.

The unincorporated community of Wogansport as well as the western portion of Baldwin are located in Glenview Township.

== Geography ==
Glenview Township has a total area of 39.35 square miles (101.9 km^{2}), of which 38.73 square miles (100.3 km^{2}) is land and 0.62 square miles (1.6 km^{2}) is water.

=== Major highways ===
- US 83

== Demographics ==
As of the 2023 American Community Survey, there were an estimated 83 households.
