= Valley Township, Barnes County, North Dakota =

Civil township in North Dakota, U.S.

Coordinates: 46°56′10″N 97°59′44″W

Valley Township is a civil township in Barnes County, North Dakota, United States. As of the 2000 census, its population was 565.
