= Berlin Township, Cass County, North Dakota =

Township in North Dakota, US

Berlin Township, North Dakota
- Township
- Location within North Dakota
- Coordinates: 47°01′15″N 97°00′24″W
- Country: United States
- State: North Dakota
- County: Cass

Area
  - Total: 34.2 sq mi (88.6 km^{2})
  - Land: 34.2 sq mi (88.6 km^{2})
  - Water: 0 sq mi (0.00 km^{2})
- Elevation: 899 ft (274 m)

Population (2020)
  - Total: 114
  - Density: 3.33/sq mi (1.29/km^{2})
- Time zone: UTC-6 (Central (CST))
  - Summer (DST): UTC-5 (CDT)
- Area code: 701
- FIPS code: 38-06260
- GNIS feature ID: 1036381

Berlin Township is a township in Cass County, North Dakota, United States. The population was 114 at the 2020 census.
