= Brenna Township, North Dakota =

- Township
- Location within North Dakota
- Coordinates: 47°53′22″N 97°10′29″W
- Country: United States
- State: North Dakota
- County: Grand Forks

Area
  - Total: 35.81 sq mi (92.75 km^{2})
  - Land: 35.78 sq mi (92.68 km^{2})
  - Water: 0.027 sq mi (0.07 km^{2})
- Elevation: 846 ft (258 m)

Population (2020)
  - Total: 776
  - Density: 21.7/sq mi (8.37/km^{2})
- Time zone: UTC-6 (Central (CST))
  - Summer (DST): UTC-5 (CDT)
- ZIP codes: 58201, 58203 (Grand Forks)
- Area code: 701
- FIPS code: 38-09300
- GNIS feature ID: 1036602

Brenna Township is a township in Grand Forks County, North Dakota, United States. The population was 776 at the 2020 census.

The unincorporated community of Powell is located near the township's northern edge.

== Geography ==
Brenna Township has a total area of 35.812 square miles (92.75 km^{2}), of which 35.785 square miles (92.68 km^{2}) is land and 0.027 square miles (0.070 km^{2}) is water.

=== Major highways ===
- U.S. Highway 2

== Demographics ==
As of the 2023 American Community Survey, there were an estimated 334 households.
