= Tanner Township, Kidder County, North Dakota =

Civil township in North Dakota, U.S.

Coordinates: 46.73333°N 99.525°W

Tanner Township is a civil township in Kidder County, North Dakota, United States.
