= Logan Center Township, North Dakota =

- Township
- Location within North Dakota
- Coordinates: 47°48′10″N 97°49′04″W
- Country: United States
- State: North Dakota
- County: Grand Forks

Area
  - Total: 36.09 sq mi (93.46 km^{2})
  - Land: 36.07 sq mi (93.41 km^{2})
  - Water: 0.021 sq mi (0.054 km^{2})
- Elevation: 1,430 ft (436 m)

Population (2020)
  - Total: 47
  - Density: 1.3/sq mi (0.50/km^{2})
- Time zone: UTC-6 (Central (CST))
  - Summer (DST): UTC-5 (CDT)
- ZIP codes: 58212 (Aneta); 58251 (Larimore); 58267 (Northwood)
- Area code: 701
- FIPS code: 38-47580
- GNIS feature ID: 1036599

Logan Center Township is a township in Grand Forks County, North Dakota, United States. The population was 47 at the 2020 census.

Its namesake, the unincorporated community of Logan Center, is located in the township's center.

== Geography ==
Logan Center Township has a total area of 36.085 square miles (93.46 km^{2}), of which 36.064 square miles (93.41 km^{2}) is land and 0.021 square miles (0.054 km^{2}) is water.

== Demographics ==
As of the 2024 American Community Survey, there were an estimated 17 households with a margin of error of 14.
