= Highland Township, Cass County, North Dakota =

Township in North Dakota, US

Highland Township, North Dakota
- Township
- Location within North Dakota
- Coordinates: 46°40′23″N 97°29′36″W
- Country: United States
- State: North Dakota
- County: Cass

Area
  - Total: 35.93 sq mi (93.07 km^{2})
  - Land: 35.74 sq mi (92.57 km^{2})
  - Water: 0.19 sq mi (0.50 km^{2})
- Elevation: 1,020 ft (311 m)

Population (2020)
  - Total: 114
  - Density: 3.19/sq mi (1.23/km^{2})
- Time zone: UTC-6 (Central (CST))
  - Summer (DST): UTC-5 (CDT)
- Area code: 701
- FIPS code: 38-37900
- GNIS feature ID: 1036356

Highland Township is a township in Cass County, North Dakota, United States. The population was 114 at the 2020 census.

== Geography ==
Highland Township has a total area of 35.934 square miles (93.07 km^{2}), of which 35.742 square miles (92.57 km^{2}) is land and 0.192 square miles (0.50 km^{2}) is water.

=== Major highways ===
- North Dakota Highway 46

== Demographics ==
As of the 2023 American Community Survey, there were an estimated 31 households.
