= Rock Island Township, Williams County, North Dakota =

Coordinates: 48°35′25″N 103°28′19″W

Rock Island Township is a township in Williams County, North Dakota, United States. It has a land area of 34.4 square miles (89 km^{2}). As of the 2010 census it had a population of zero.
