= Fargo Township, North Dakota =

Township in North Dakota, US

- Township
- Location within North Dakota
- Coordinates: 46°56′37″N 96°47′39″W
- Country: United States
- State: North Dakota
- County: Cass

Area
  - Total: 0.13 sq mi (0.34 km^{2})
  - Land: 0.13 sq mi (0.34 km^{2})
  - Water: 0 sq mi (0.00 km^{2})
- Elevation: 892 ft (272 m)

Population (2020)
  - Total: 3
  - Density: 23/sq mi (8.8/km^{2})
- Time zone: UTC-6 (Central (CST))
  - Summer (DST): UTC-5 (CDT)
- ZIP code: 58102 (Fargo)
- Area code: 701
- FIPS code: 38-25740
- GNIS feature ID: 2397799

Fargo Township is a township in Cass County, North Dakota, United States. The population was 3 at the 2020 census.

== Geography ==
Fargo Township has a total area of 0.09 square miles (0.23 km^{2}), all land.
