= Raymond Township, Cass County, North Dakota =

Township in North Dakota, US

Raymond Township, North Dakota
- Township
- Location within North Dakota
- Coordinates: 46°56′07″N 96°59′19″W
- Country: United States
- State: North Dakota
- County: Cass

Area
  - Total: 34.42 sq mi (89.16 km^{2})
  - Land: 34.35 sq mi (88.97 km^{2})
  - Water: 0.073 sq mi (0.19 km^{2})
- Elevation: 896 ft (273 m)

Population (2020)
  - Total: 246
  - Density: 7.3/sq mi (2.8/km^{2})
- Time zone: UTC-6 (Central (CST))
  - Summer (DST): UTC-5 (CDT)
- Area code: 701
- FIPS code: 38-65620
- GNIS feature ID: 1036373

Raymond Township is a township in Cass County, North Dakota, United States. The population was 246 at the 2020 census.

The unincorporated community of Prosper is located in northwestern Raymond Township.

== Geography ==
Raymond Township has a total area of 34.426 square miles (89.16 km^{2}), of which 34.352 square miles (88.97 km^{2}) is land and 0.074 square miles (0.19 km^{2}) is water.

== Demographics ==
As of the 2023 American Community Survey, there were an estimated 89 households.
