= North Dakota Highway 42 =

State highway in North Dakota, U.S.

North Dakota Highway 42

Route information
- Maintained by NDDOT
- Length: 37.441 mi (60.255 km)
- Existed: 1927–present

Major junctions
- South end: ND 50 near Corinth
- ND 5 in Crosby
- North end: Highway 350 at the Canadian border in Ambrose

Location
- Country: United States
- State: North Dakota
- Counties: Divide

Highway system
- North Dakota State Highway System; Interstate; US; State
← ND 41	→ ND 43

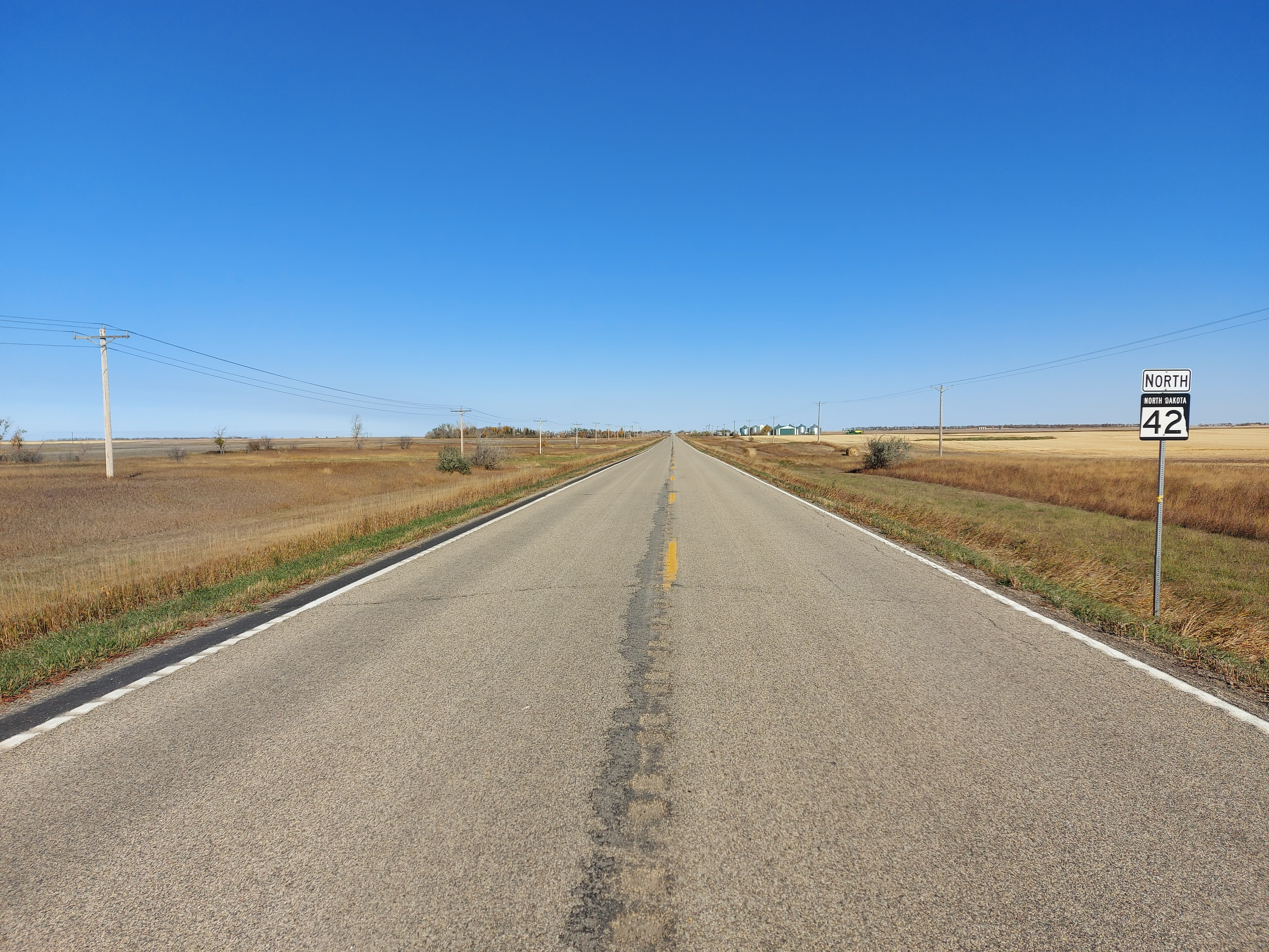
ND 42 on the north side of Ambrose, 3 miles south of the Ambrose–Torquay Border Crossing

North Dakota Highway 42 (ND 42) is a north–south highway located in northwestern North Dakota. The highway traverses northern Williams and Divide Counties. The southern terminus is at ND 50 near Corinth and the northern terminus is a continuation as Saskatchewan Highway 350 (Hwy 350) at the Canadian border.

== Route description ==
ND 42 begins at a junction with ND 50 near the small town of Corinth, in northern Williams County. After going through town, it enters Divide County, and meets ND 5 in the county seat, Crosby. For 8 miles (13 km), ND 42 runs concurrently with ND 5 from Crosby to just south of Ambrose. ND 42 turns northward to end at the Canadian border. The roadway continues northward beyond the Ambrose–Torquay Border Crossing and port of entry as Hwy 350, 16 kilometres (9.9 mi) south of Torquay, Saskatchewan.

== Major intersections ==
County	Location	mi	km	Destinations	Notes
Williams		0.000	0.000	ND 50 – McGregor, Alamo	Southern terminus
Divide	Crosby	23.176	37.298	ND 5 east – Crosby, Noonan	Southern end of ND 5 concurrency
Divide		31.128	50.096	ND 5 west to US 85 – Fortuna	Northern end of ND 5 concurrency
Divide	Canada–United States border	37.441	60.255	Highway 350 north – Torquay	Ambrose-Torquay Border Crossing; northern terminus; continues north as Hwy 350
1.000 mi = 1.609 km; 1.000 km = 0.621 mi: Concurrency terminus

== History ==
From 1926 to 1927, ND 42 was previously designated onto an alignment now designated as ND 37.

== See also ==
- List of Canada-United States border crossings
