= Saskatchewan Highway 350 =

Provincial highway in Saskatchewan, Canada

Highway 350

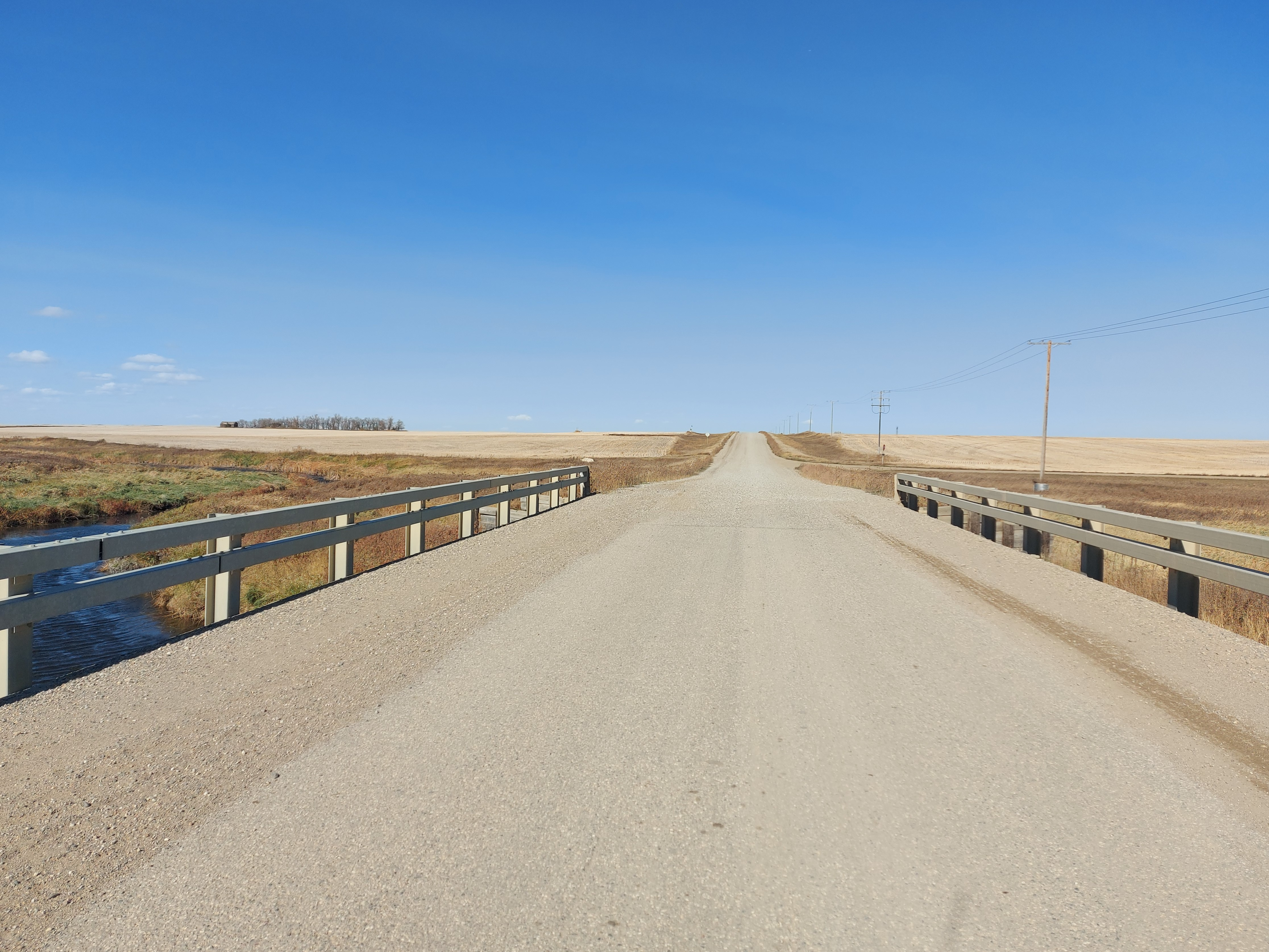
- Bridge along Highway 350 over Long Creek

Route information
- Maintained by Ministry of Highways and Infrastructure
- Length: 16.4 km (10.2 mi)

Major junctions
- South end: ND 42 at the U.S. border at Port of Torquay
- North end: Highway 18 / Highway 606 at Torquay

Location
- Country: Canada
- Province: Saskatchewan
- Rural municipalities: Cambria

Highway system
- Provincial highways in Saskatchewan
← Highway 349	→ Highway 354

Highway 350 is a provincial highway in the Canadian province of Saskatchewan. It runs from Highway 18 / Highway 606 in Torquay to North Dakota Highway 42 at the U.S. border at the Port of Torquay. It is about 16 kilometres (9.9 mi) long.

== Major intersections ==
From south to north:

Rural municipality	Location	km	mi	Destinations	Notes
Cambria No. 6	Port of Torquay	0.0	0.0	ND 42 south – Crosby	Continuation into North Dakota; southern terminus
Cambria No. 6	Port of Torquay	0.0	0.0	Canada–United States border at Ambrose–Torquay Border Crossing	
Cambria No. 6		7.2	4.5	Bridge over Long Creek	
Cambria No. 6	Torquay	16.4	10.2	Highway 18 – Oungre, Minton, Estevan Highway 606 north – Mainprize Regional Park, Midale	Northern terminus; southern terminus of Hwy 606; road continues north as Hwy 606
1.000 mi = 1.609 km; 1.000 km = 0.621 mi

== See also ==
- Transportation in Saskatchewan
- Roads in Saskatchewan
