= Writing Rock Township, Divide County, North Dakota =

Writing Rock Township
- Township
- Location within North Dakota
- Coordinates: 48°45′51″N 103°47′38″W
- Country: United States
- State: North Dakota
- County: Divide
- Elevation: 2,139 ft (652 m)

Population (2020)
  - Total: 3
- Time zone: UTC-6 (Central (CST))
- ZIP codes: 58845, 58856
- GNIS feature ID: 1036919

Writing Rock Township is a township in Divide County, North Dakota, United States. The township itself was established in 1916 and named after the Native American engraved stone found in Section 18. Writing Rock State Historic Site, established in 1936, is located within the township.

== History ==
Coal mines operated in the hills of Writing Rock after coal was first discovered there in 1907. The first school opened in 1908 or 1909. An East Writing Rock congregation was first organized by a Christian missionary in 1911 and re-organized in 1913. A large church was built in 1920.

The township's population in 1910 was 78; in 1920 it was 125.

In 1928, the election returns from Writing Rock Township were not counted by the North Dakota secretary of state, after the automobile carrying them was completely destroyed by fire on the way to Crosby.

In 2020, it was reported to have a population of 3, with 6 households in total.

== See also ==
- List of townships in North Dakota
