= Crosby Municipal Airport (North Dakota) =

- IATA: none; ICAO: none; FAA LID: D50

Summary
- Airport type: Public
- Owner: Crosby Airport Authority
- Location: Crosby, North Dakota
- Elevation AMSL: 1,950 ft (590 m)
- Coordinates: 48°55′43″N 103°17′50″W

Map
- Location of airport in North Dakota D50 (the United States)

Runways
Direction	Length		Surface
Direction	ft	m	Surface
12/30	3,800	1,158	Asphalt
3/21	2,700	823	Turf

Statistics (2007)
- Aircraft operations: 2,440
- Source: Federal Aviation Administration

Crosby Municipal Airport (FAA LID: D50) is a public airport located one mile (1.6 km) north of the central business district of Crosby, in Divide County, North Dakota, United States. It is owned by the Crosby Airport Authority.

== Facilities and aircraft ==
Crosby Municipal Airport covers an area of 217 acres (88 ha) which contains two runways: 12/30 with an asphalt surface measuring 3,800 by 60 feet (1,158 x 18 m) and 3/21 with a turf surface measuring 2,700 by 100 feet (823 x 30m).

For the 12-month period ending July 31, 2007, the airport had 2,440 aircraft operations: 90% general aviation, 8% air taxi, and 2% military.

== See also ==
- List of airports in North Dakota
