= Alkabo School =

Historic school building in North Dakota, United States

- U.S. National Register of Historic Places
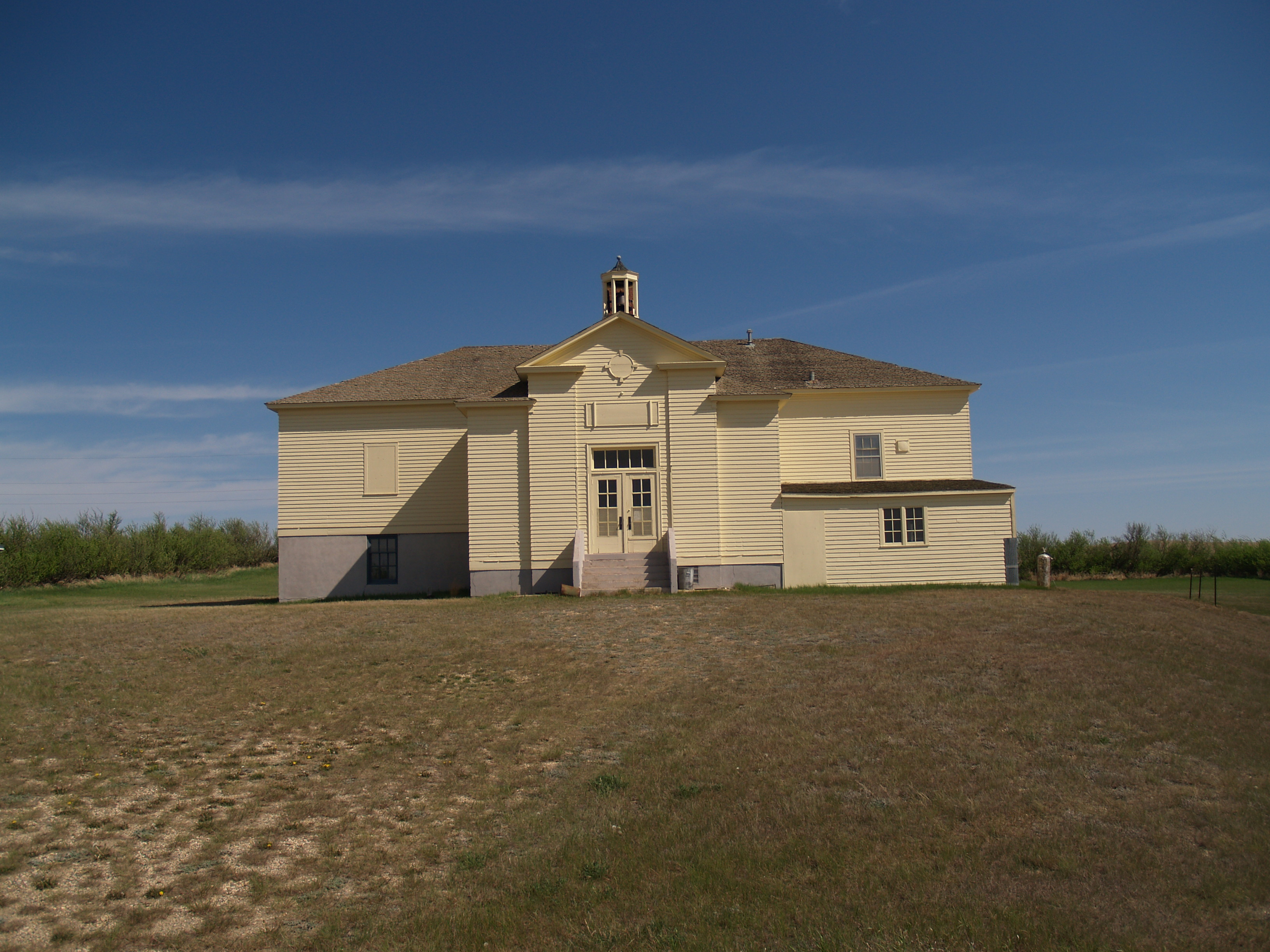
- Pictured in 2008

- Location within North Dakota Location within the United States
- Location: North end of Main St., Alkabo, North Dakota
- Coordinates: 48°51′58″N 103°53′13″W
- Built: 1934
- Architect: Edwin W. Molander
- Architectural style: Italian Renaissance Revival, Colonial Revival
- NRHP reference No.: 10000997
- Added to NRHP: December 7, 2010

Alkabo School, in Alkabo, North Dakota, was listed on the National Register of Historic Places on December 7, 2010 with registration number 10000997. It is located at the north end of Main St. in Alkabo. The school was built in 1934 by the William Nordman Company of Noonan. It was designed by architect Edwin W. Molander using the Italian Renaissance Revival and Colonial Revival styles. The school closed in 1963.

Minnesota politician Martin Sabo attended the school.

Alkabo has few residents and has largely been abandoned. It is in the northwestern corner of the state.
