= Clinton Township, Divide County, North Dakota =

Clinton Township
- Township
- Location within North Dakota
- Coordinates: 48°51′41″N 103°46′21″W
- Country: United States
- State: North Dakota
- County: Divide

Population (2020)
  - Total: 22
- Time zone: UTC-6 (Central (CST))

Clinton Township is a township in Divide County, North Dakota, United States. In 2020, it was reported to have a population of 22, with 9 households in total.
