= Travelers Hotel (Noonan, North Dakota) =

- U.S. National Register of Historic Places
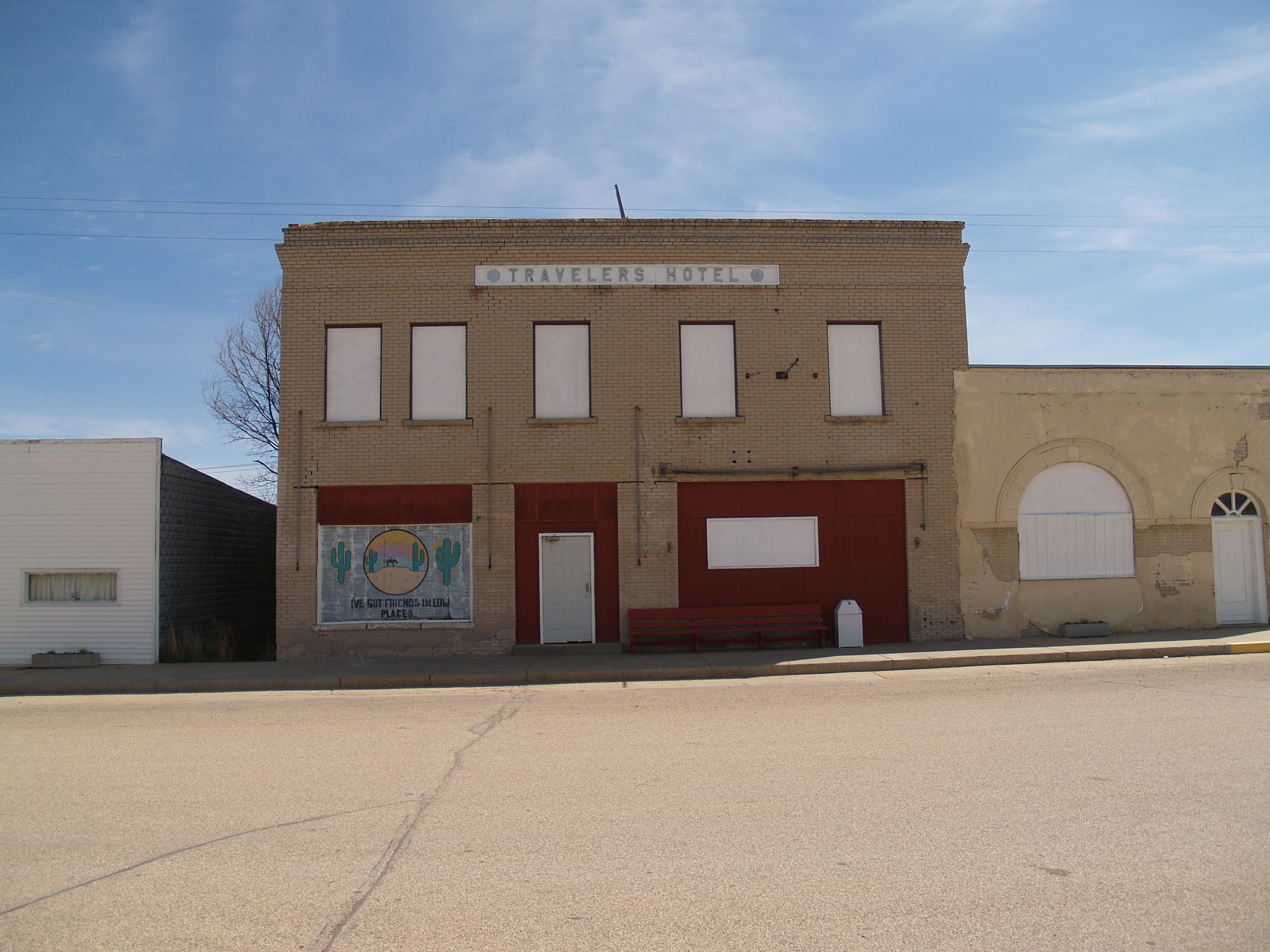

- Location within North Dakota Location within the United States
- Location: 121 Main St, Noonan, North Dakota
- Area: less than one acre
- Built: 1910
- Architectural style: Early Commercial
- NRHP reference No.: 10000423
- Added to NRHP: July 6, 2010

The Travelers Hotel on Main Street in Noonan, North Dakota, United States, is a hotel that was built in 1910. Sharpshooter Annie Oakley and railroad executive James J. Hill have both stayed at the hotel.

It was listed on the National Register of Historic Places in 2010.
