= G. Raymond Carlson =

- Education: North Central University, Summit Pacific College
- Occupation: Pastor (Assemblies of God)
- Spouse: Mae Steffler
- Children: 3
- Religion: Pentecostal
- Ordained: 1941
- Writings: "Preparing to Teach God's Word," "The Life Worth Living," "Spiritual Dynamics," and "Our Faith and Fellowship."
- Offices held: General Superintendent of the Assemblies of God USA, Assistant General Superintendent, Minnesota District Superintendent
- Title: Brother, Reverend

Guy Raymond Carlson (February 17, 1918 – January 29, 1999) was the 10th general superintendent of the Assemblies of God USA (1986–1993).

== Early life and ministry ==
Guy Raymond Carlson was born in Crosby, North Dakota, on February 17, 1918. He made a public profession of his faith at age 7, began preaching at 15 and received his ministerial credentials at 16. Following high school graduation, he went to Western Pentecostal Bible College in Winnipeg, Canada. In 1938, Carlson married. Carlson began his pastoral ministry in 1940 in Thief River Falls, Minn., and was ordained in 1941. Three years later he was elected district presbyter and district Sunday school director. In 1948, he was elected superintendent of the Minnesota District. At 30, he was the youngest man to serve any district in this capacity. He led the district until 1961, when he became president of the church's North Central Bible College in Minneapolis. He was assistant general superintendent from 1969 to 1985.

== General superintendent ==
Elected as general superintendent at the General Council in San Antonio in 1985, Carlson took office in 1986. He led the Assemblies of God during a period of significant growth before announcing his retirement in 1993. During Carlson's administration, U.S. Assemblies of God churches increased from 10,582 to 11,689. The church's foreign missions program assisted Assemblies of God fellowships around the world, and the worldwide constituency increased from 15 million to 25 million adherents. Under Carlson's leadership, a "Decade of Harvest" emphasis carried the Assemblies of God into the 1990s with the most ambitious evangelistic goals in the church's history. Carlson's term as general superintendent included sex-and-money scandals involving television evangelists Jim Bakker and Jimmy Swaggart, whose preaching credentials were revoked.

Carlson also served on the board of administration of the Pentecostal Fellowship of North America, the advisory committee of the Pentecostal World Conference, the executive committee of the board of administration of the National Association of Evangelicals and the executive committee for the Religious Alliance Against Pornography.
