= Fertile Valley Township, Divide County, North Dakota =

Fertile Valley Township
- Township
- Location within North Dakota
- Coordinates: 48°40′38″N 103°55′22″W
- Country: United States
- State: North Dakota
- County: Divide
- Elevation: 2,044 ft (623 m)

Population (2020)
  - Total: 29
- Time zone: UTC-6 (Central (CST))
- GNIS feature ID: 1036924

Fertile Valley is a township in Divide County, North Dakota, United States. It has a population of 29 and an elevation of 2,044 feet.

Fertile Valley contains a private airstrip named Storseth Airstrip, and given the FAA LID NA63. It has a grass runway measuring 1,400 x 50 feet (427 x 15 meters).
