= Elmer Knutson =

Canadian businessman (1914–2001)

- Born: Elmer Stanley Knutson; October 30, 1914 near Torquay, Saskatchewan, Canada
- Died: August 9, 2001 (aged 86); Edmonton, Alberta, Canada
- Known for: Activism, Fringe politics

Elmer Stanley Knutson (October 30, 1914 – August 9, 2001) was a Canadian businessman, activist and fringe politician. Knutson was a strong supporter of creating an independent western Canada, in which the west would become sovereign from Canada's federal government. He has been credited with "whip[ping] Western alienation into a political movement."

== Politics and activism ==
With the advent Canada's National Energy Program in 1980, which gave the federal government more control over oil and gas resources in western Canada, he founded the Western Canada Federation (West-Fed), a non-partisan organization to fight the federal Liberal Party. Knutson held the belief that the 1931 Statute of Westminster, which granted legislative equality with the United Kingdom to Canada, also granted sovereignty to the provinces, because the provinces had not individually signed on to confederation. This view was criticized by constitutional experts.

Many West-Fed members eventually left the organization to join the Victoria-based Western Canada Concept (WCC) party which, unlike West-Fed, fielded candidates in elections.

Knutson was defeated in 1983 in his attempt to win the leadership of the Social Credit Party of Canada. In 1984, he founded the Confederation of Regions Party to advocate for a new Canadian constitution with more regional autonomy. He stepped down as leader a little more than a year later, saying, "If I can't get my message across, I had better give up trying."

He tried his hand at provincial politics in two by-elections as well as the 1986 Alberta General Election in the Olds-Didsbury riding, and came up second.

== Personal life ==
Knutson was born on the family farm in Torquay, Saskatchewan. He worked on road gangs, in lumber camps and mines until he won a baseball scholarship to a Lutheran college in North Dakota, USA. After serving in the Royal Canadian Navy during World War II, he opened a garage in Saskatoon. He later moved to Edmonton to form his own tractor parts company. In 1969, he established Derrick Dodge Chrysler, a car dealership, and ran it until 1976.

Knutson died at the age of 86 in Edmonton.
