= Lincoln Valley Township, Divide County, North Dakota =

Lincoln Valley Township
- Township
- Location within North Dakota
- Coordinates: 48°51′4″N 103°39′44″W
- Country: United States
- State: North Dakota
- County: Divide
- Elevation: 2,234 ft (681 m)

Population (2020)
  - Total: 19
- Time zone: UTC-6 (Central (CST))
- ZIP codes: 58844
- GNIS feature ID: 1036930

Lincoln Valley Township is a township in Divide County, North Dakota, United States. In 2020, it was reported to have a population of 19, with 13 households in total.

U.S. Route 85 runs through the township.
