= Torquay, Saskatchewan =

Village in Saskatchewan, Canada

Coordinates: 49°08′31″N 103°29′52″W

Location of Torquay in Saskatchewan

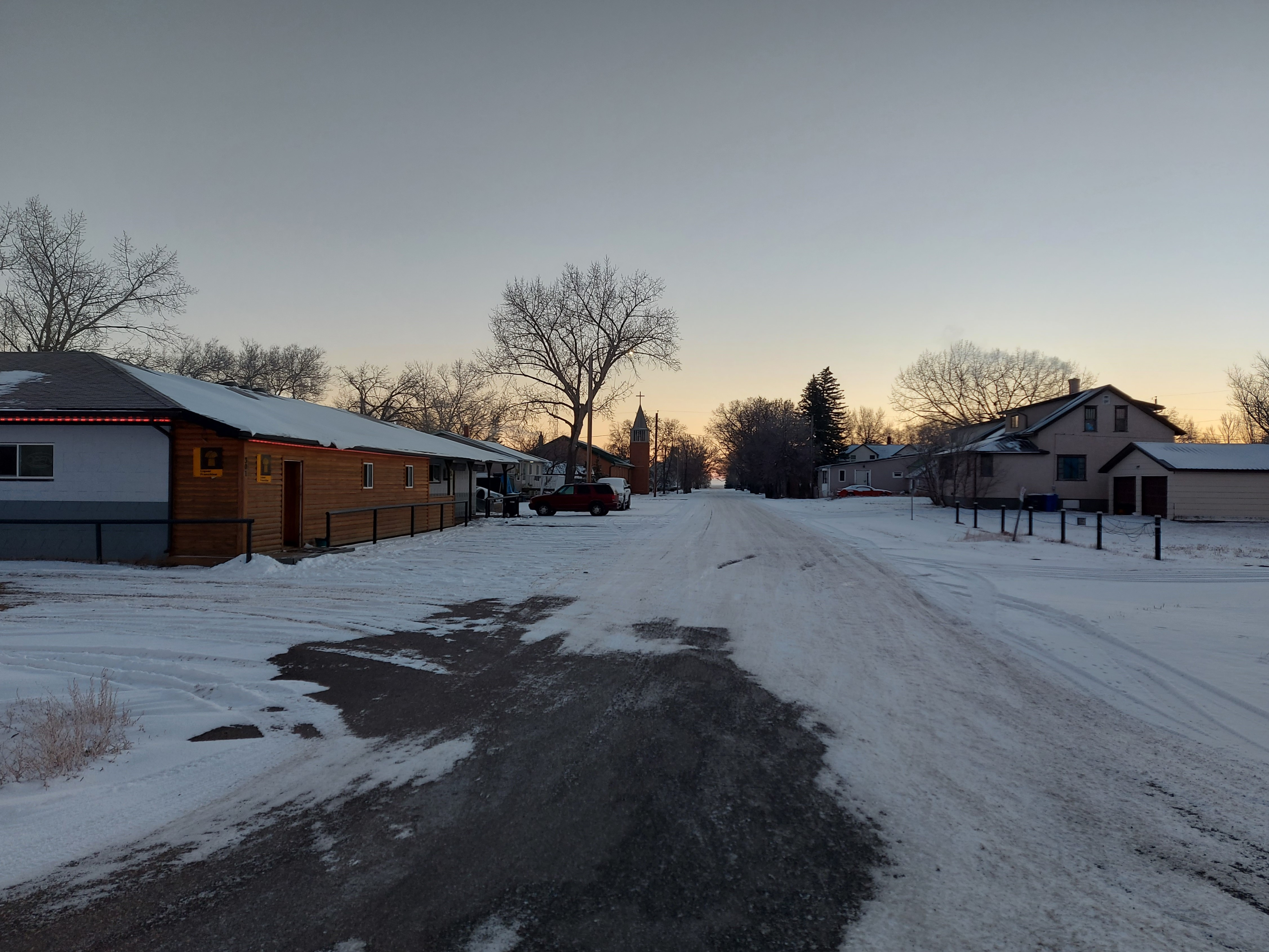
Saskatchewan Ave at dawn in Torquay

Torquay (2016 population: 255) is a village in the Canadian province of Saskatchewan within the Rural Municipality of Cambria No. 6 and Census Division No. 2. It was named after Torquay in Devon, England.

Torquay is at the junction of Highway 350 and 18.

== History ==
Torquay was established in 1912 when the land was sold to the Canadian Pacific Railway for $2,400. At the suggestion of a railroad superintendent's wife, the area was named after the English town of Torquay as like its namesake, it had an abundant water supply. The Ambrose-Torquay Border Crossing that connects Torquay with the North Dakota village of Ambrose opened in 1915 and remains in daily use today.

Politician Elmer Knutson, founder of the Confederations of Regions Party, was born on his family's farm in Torquay in 1914.

Torquay incorporated as a village on December 11, 1923. The first council meeting as the Village of Torquay was held on January 9, 1924.

In May 2018 the Canadian government announced plans to construct the country's first geothermal power plant in the area, with the eventual aim of using renewable energy to power hundreds of thousands of homes in Saskatchewan.

== Demographics ==
Population history (1981–2021)
Year	Pop.	±%
1981	311	—
1986	321	+3.2%
1991	285	−11.2%
1996	285	+0.0%
2001	231	−18.9%
2006	184	−20.3%
2011	236	+28.3%
2016	255	+8.1%
2021	215	−15.7%
Source: Statistics Canada via Saskatchewan Bureau of Statistics

In the 2021 Census of Population conducted by Statistics Canada, Torquay had a population of 215 living in 91 of its 103 total private dwellings, a change of −15.7% from its 2016 population of 255. With a land area of 1.35 km^{2} (0.52 sq mi), it had a population density of 159.3/km^{2} (412.5/sq mi) in 2021.

In the 2016 Census of Population, the Village of Torquay recorded a population of 255 living in 99 of its 116 total private dwellings, a 7.5% change from its 2011 population of 236. With a land area of 1.35 km^{2} (0.52 sq mi), it had a population density of 188.9/km^{2} (489.2/sq mi) in 2016.

== See also ==
- List of villages in Saskatchewan
- List of francophone communities in Saskatchewan
- List of communities in Saskatchewan
