= Ambrose–Torquay Border Crossing =

Border crossing in North Dakota, US and Saskatchewan, Canada

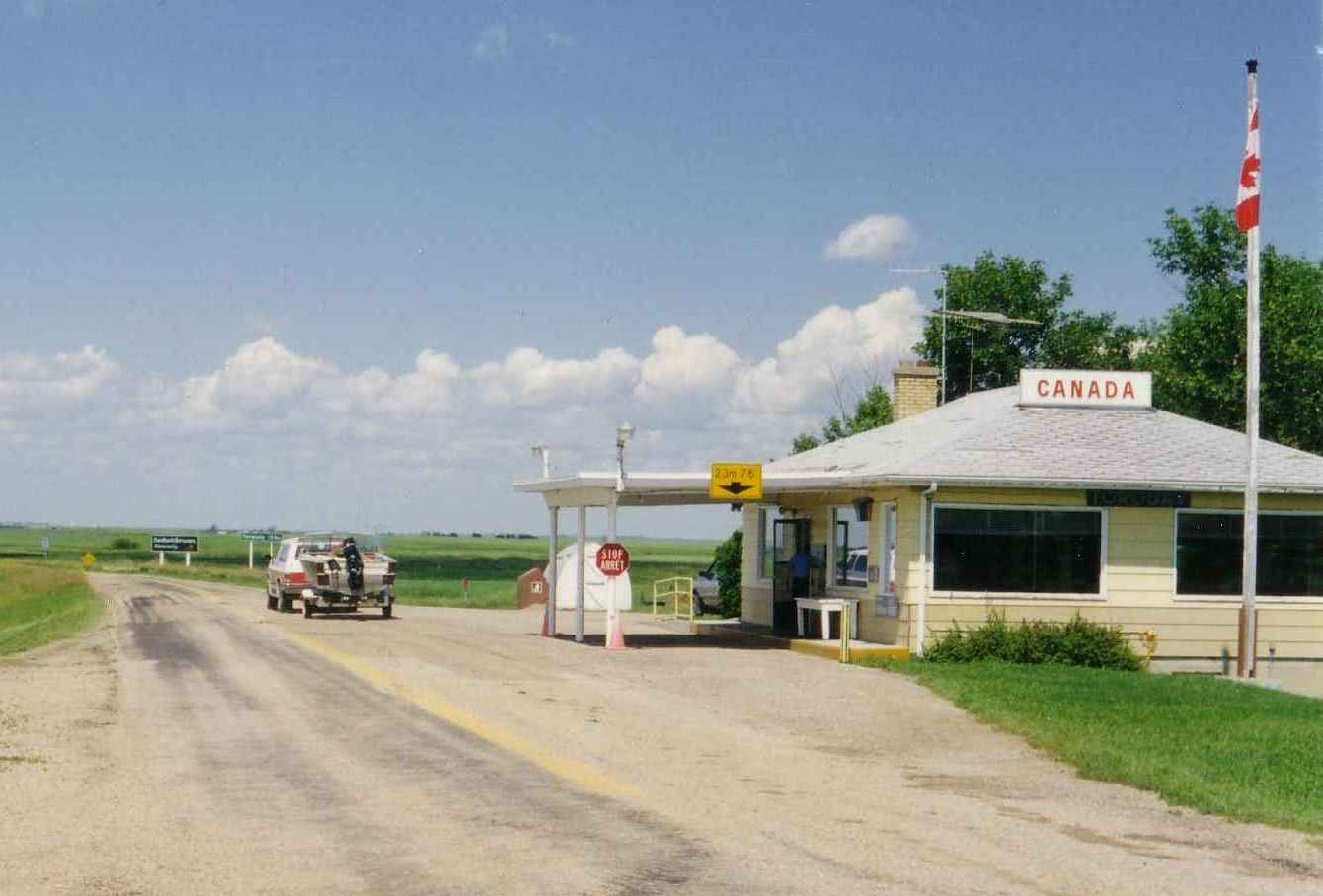
- Canada Border Inspection Station at Torquay, Saskatchewan

Location
- Country: United States; Canada
- Location: ND 42 / Highway 350; US Port: 10935 State Hwy 42, Ambrose, North Dakota 58833-9405; Canadian Port: Saskatchewan Highway 350, Torquay, Saskatchewan S0C 2L0
- Coordinates: 48°59′58″N 103°29′13″W

Details
- Opened: 1909

Website
- US Canadian
- U.S. Inspection Station-Ambrose, North Dakota
- U.S. National Register of Historic Places
- MPS: U.S. Border Inspection Stations MPS
- NRHP reference No.: 14000587
- Added to NRHP: September 10, 2014

The Ambrose–Torquay Border Crossing connects the towns of Ambrose, North Dakota, and Torquay, Saskatchewan, on the Canada–US border. North Dakota Highway 42 on the American side joins Saskatchewan Highway 350 on the Canadian side.

== Canadian side ==
The initial customs office was opened at Dupuis in June 1909, but was relocated closer to the border at Marienthal a month later. The two communities were in close proximity. A North-West Mounted Police (NWMP) corporal was in charge during the first year and the Port of North Portal provided administrative oversight. In 1912, the office moved into a government building. In 1935, a combined residence/office was erected, which was replaced in 1958. The crossing was renamed Torquay around the 1960s.

== US side ==
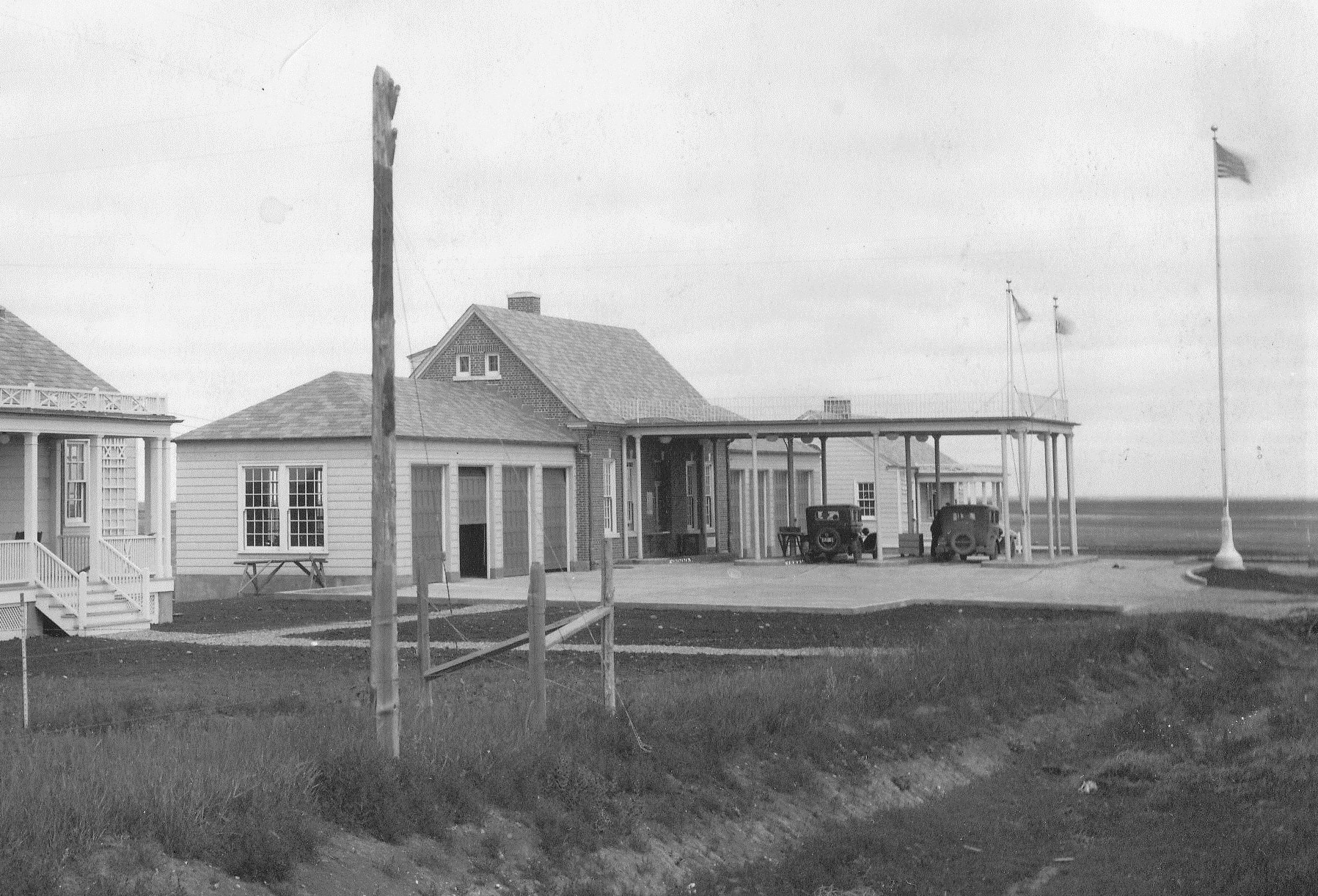
US Border Station at Ambrose, ND as seen in 1932

In 1906, the railroad reached northward to Ambrose. Harvested grain flowed southward across the border in bond before re-entering Canada. This practice continued until the Canadian Pacific Railway opened the east–west Neptune branch through Torquay in 1913.

The United States continues to use the border station built in 1937, which was listed on the U.S. National Register of Historic Places in 2014. Ambrose is now largely a ghost town.

== See also ==
- List of Canada–United States border crossings
