= Corinth, North Dakota =

- Unincorporated community
- Location within North Dakota Location within the United States
- Coordinates: 48°36′45″N 103°19′40″W
- Country: United States
- State: North Dakota
- County: Williams
- Elevation: 2,205 ft (672 m)
- Time zone: UTC-6 (Central (CST))
  - Summer (DST): UTC-5 (CDT)
- Area code: 701
- GNIS feature ID: 1028456

Corinth is an unincorporated community in Williams County, North Dakota, United States. North Dakota Highway 42 runs along the eastern side of the community.

== History ==
The population was 50 in 1940.
