= Burg Township, Divide County, North Dakota =

Burg Township
- Township
- Location within North Dakota
- Coordinates: 48°45′51″N 103°31′51″W
- Country: United States
- State: North Dakota
- County: Divide
- Elevation: 2,152 ft (656 m)

Population (2020)
  - Total: 13
- Time zone: UTC-6 (Central (CST))
- ZIP codes: 58730, 58830, 58833
- GNIS feature ID: 1036925

Burg Township is a township in Divide County, North Dakota, United States. In 2020, it was reported to have a population of 13, with 24 households in total.
