= Alkabo, North Dakota =

- Unincorporated community
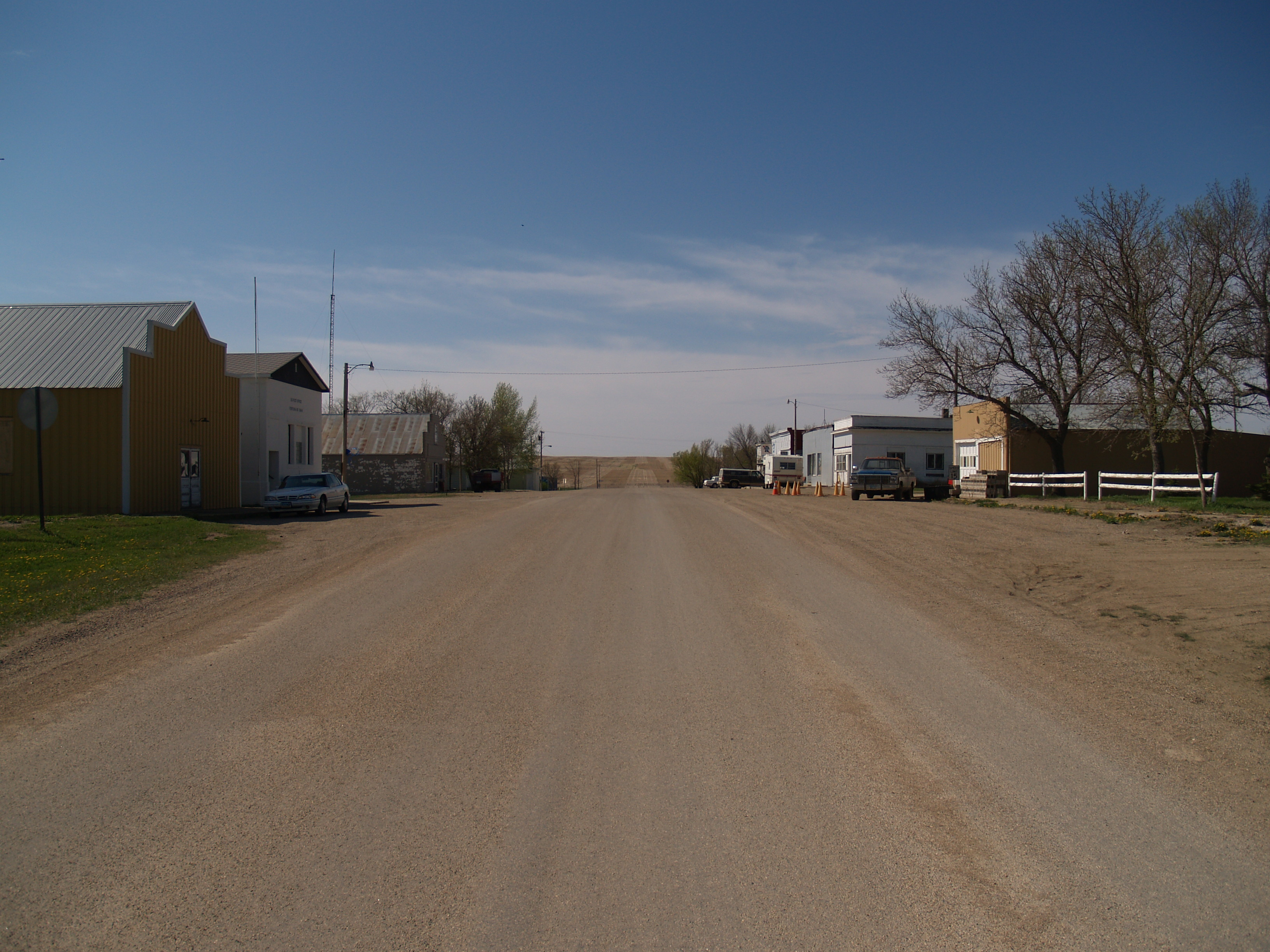
- A street in Alkabo

- Location within North Dakota Location within the United States
- Coordinates: 48°51′46″N 103°53′25″W
- Country: United States
- State: North Dakota
- County: Divide
- Elevation: 2,188 ft (667 m)
- Time zone: UTC-6 (Central (CST))
  - Summer (DST): UTC-5 (CDT)
- Area code: 701
- GNIS feature ID: 1027671

Alkabo is an unincorporated community in Divide County, North Dakota, United States. Alkabo is located on the Dakota, Missouri Valley and Western Railroad, 6 miles (9.7 km) west-southwest of Fortuna. The Alkabo School, which is listed on the National Register of Historic Places, is located in Alkabo.

== History ==
The population was 40 in 1940.

The name is a portmanteau of alkali and gumbo, two types of soil found in the area.

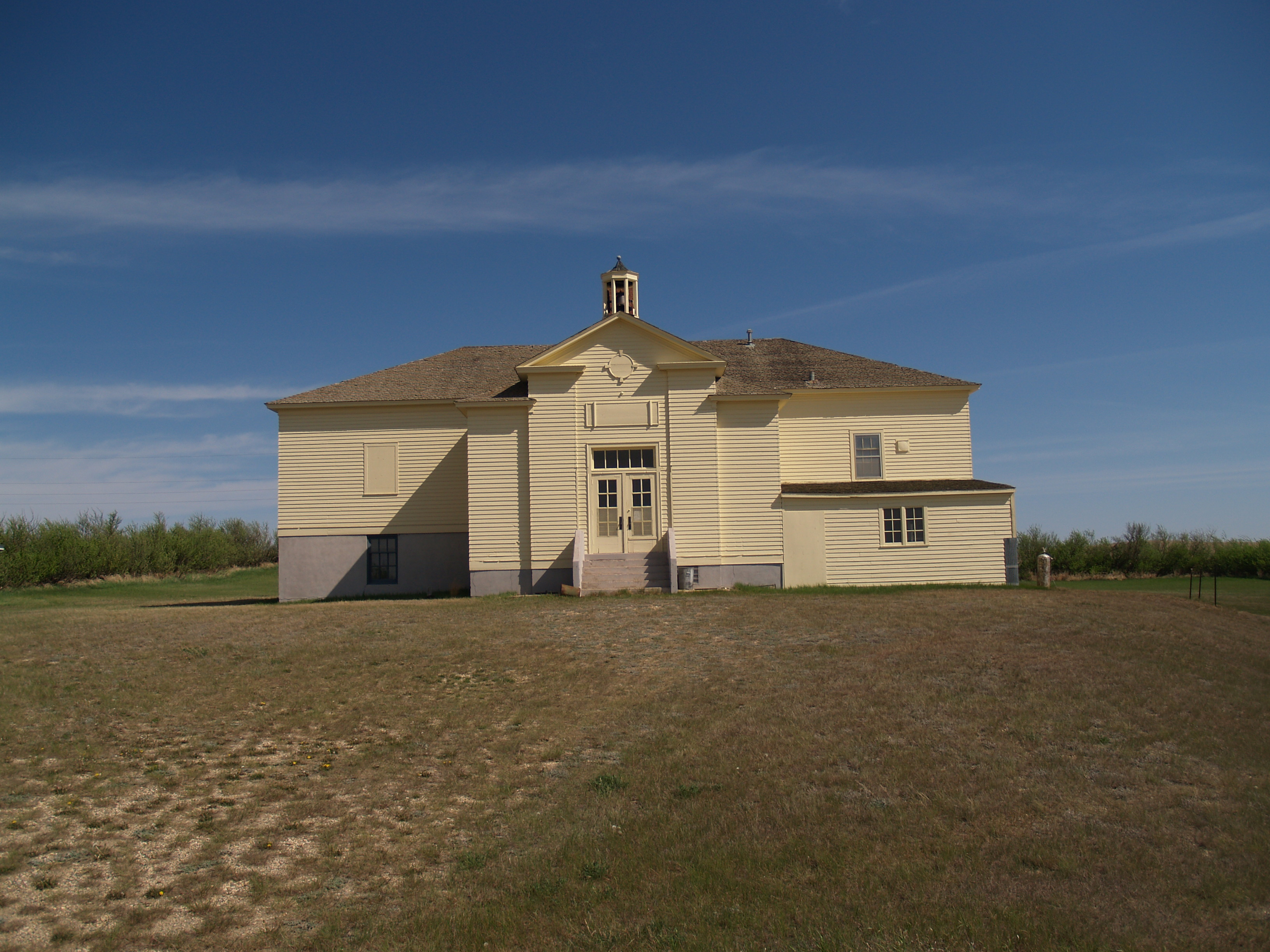
The Alkabo School

== See also ==
- List of geographic names derived from portmanteaus
