= Sioux Trail Township, Divide County, North Dakota =

Sioux Trail Township
- Township
- Location within North Dakota
- Coordinates: 48°40′30″N 103°42′50″W
- Country: United States
- State: North Dakota
- County: Divide
- Elevation: 2,264 ft (690 m)

Population (2020)
  - Total: 41
- Time zone: UTC-6 (Central (CST))
- GNIS feature ID: 1036921

Sioux Trail is a township in Divide County, North Dakota, United States, with a population of 41 people, at an elevation of 2,264 feet.
