= Smoky Butte Township, Divide County, North Dakota =

Smoky Butte Township
- Township
- Location within North Dakota
- Coordinates: 48°40′38″N 103°36′7″W
- Country: United States
- State: North Dakota
- County: Divide
- Elevation: 2,054 ft (626 m)

Population (2020)
  - Total: 20
- Time zone: UTC-6 (Central (CST))
- GNIS feature ID: 1759396

Smoky Butte is a township in Divide County, North Dakota, United States. It has a population of 20 and an elevation of 2,054 feet (626 m).

U.S. Route 85 runs through the township.

Smoky Butte contains two waterfowl production areas.

== See also ==
- List of townships in North Dakota
