= Alexandria Township, Divide County, North Dakota =

Alexandria Township
- Township
- Location within North Dakota
- Coordinates: 48°45′51″N 103°39′45″W
- Country: United States
- State: North Dakota
- County: Divide
- Elevation: 2,241 ft (683 m)

Population (2020)
  - Total: 18
- Time zone: UTC-6 (Central (CST))
- ZIP codes: 58844, 58856
- GNIS feature ID: 1036918

Alexandria Township is a township in Divide County, North Dakota, United States. In 2020, it was reported to have a population of 18, with 13 households in total.

U.S. Route 85 runs through the township.
