= Colgan, North Dakota =

- Unincorporated community
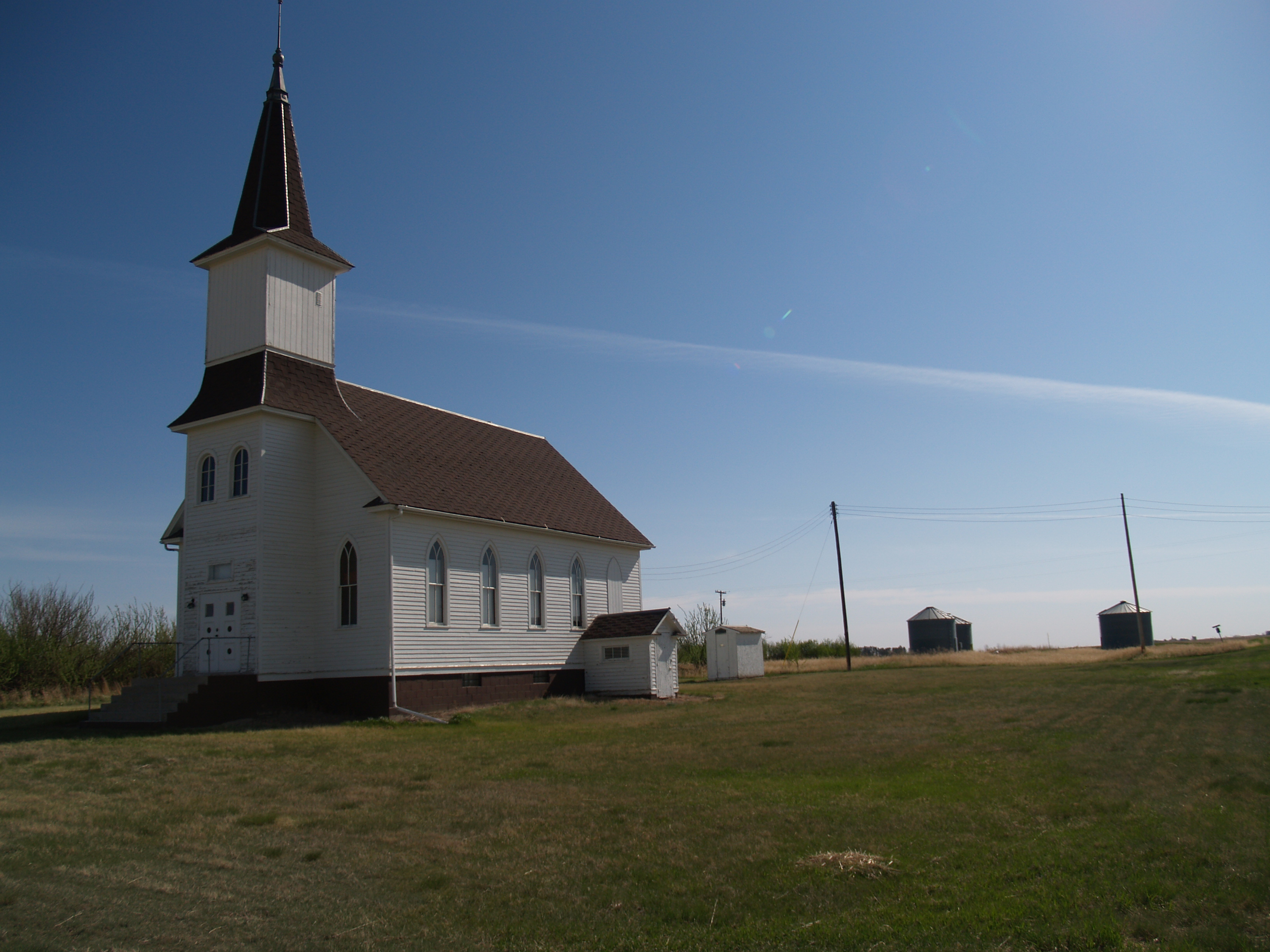
- Lutheran church in Colgan

- Location within North Dakota Location within the United States
- Coordinates: 48°56′54″N 103°37′42″W
- Country: United States
- State: North Dakota
- County: Divide
- Elevation: 2,126 ft (648 m)
- Time zone: UTC-6 (Central (CST))
  - Summer (DST): UTC-5 (CDT)
- Area code: 701
- GNIS feature ID: 1028422

Colgan is an unincorporated community in Divide County, North Dakota, United States.

== History ==
The population was 97 in 1940.
