= Crosby, North Dakota =

City in North Dakota

- City
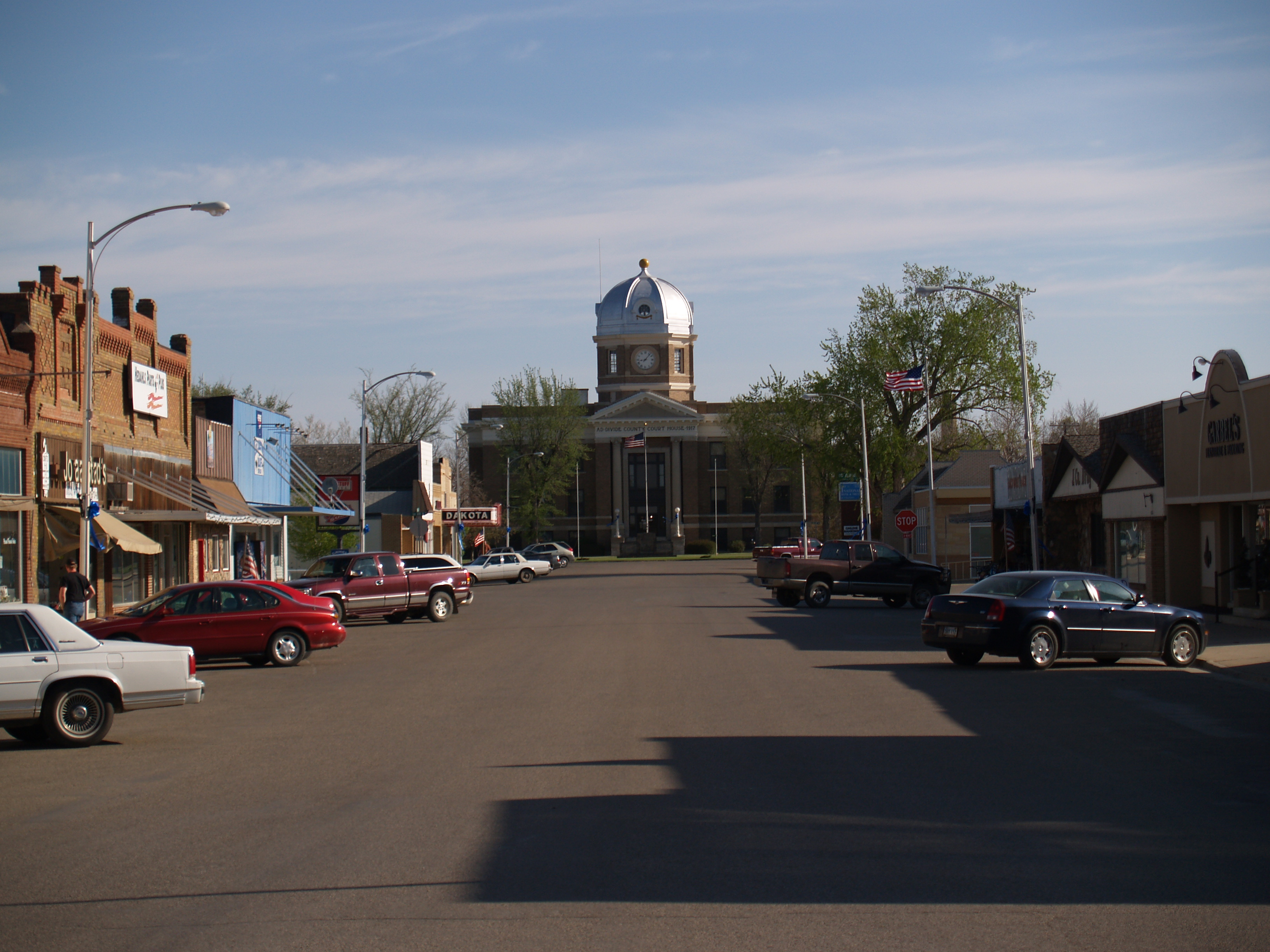
- Business district in Crosby
- Nickname: Cros-berry
- Motto: "Come Home To Crosby"
- Location of Crosby, North Dakota

- Location in the United States
- Coordinates: 48°54′58″N 103°17′48″W
- Country: United States
- State: North Dakota
- County: Divide
- Founded: 1904

Government
  - Mayor: James Jacobs

Area
  - Total: 1.41 sq mi (3.65 km^{2})
  - Land: 1.41 sq mi (3.65 km^{2})
  - Water: 0 sq mi (0.00 km^{2})
- Elevation: 1,962 ft (598 m)

Population (2020)
  - Total: 1,065
  - Estimate (2022): 1,058
  - Density: 755.2/sq mi (291.59/km^{2})
- Time zone: UTC-6 (Central (CST))
  - Summer (DST): UTC-5 (CDT)
- ZIP code: 58730
- Area code: 701
- FIPS code: 38-16940
- GNIS feature ID: 1035981
- Highways: ND 5
- Website: City of Crosby

Crosby is a city in and the county seat of Divide County, North Dakota, United States. It is the largest city in the county, and its population was 1,065 at the 2020 census.

== History ==
Crosby was founded in 1904 at the end of a Great Northern Railway branch line that began in Berthold. At the time, it was a town. Crosby became a village in 1907, three years before the creation of Divide County and its acceptance as county seat. It became a statutory city in 1967.

A post office was created on June 24, 1904.

Crosby has one listing on the National Register for Historic Places, the Divide County Courthouse, which was built in 1917 and nominated for the list the same year.

The name comes from S. A. Crosby, a businessman from Portal involved in establishing the city.

== Geography ==
According to the United States Census Bureau, the city has a total area of 1.37 square miles (3.55 km^{2}), all land.

The city is around 35 miles east of the Montana border. It is 6 miles south of the Canadian border with the province of Saskatchewan.

== Demographics ==
Historical population
Census	Pop.	Note	%±
1910	206		—
1920	1,147		456.8%
1930	1,271		10.8%
1940	1,404		10.5%
1950	1,689		20.3%
1960	1,759		4.1%
1970	1,545		−12.2%
1980	1,469		−4.9%
1990	1,312		−10.7%
2000	1,089		−17.0%
2010	1,070		−1.7%
2020	1,065		−0.5%
2022 (est.)	1,058		−0.7%
U.S. Decennial Census; 2020 Census

=== 2010 census ===
As of the census of 2010, there were 1,070 people, 513 households, and 281 families living in the city. The population density was 781.0 inhabitants per square mile (301.5/km^{2}). There were 613 housing units at an average density of 447.4 per square mile (172.7/km^{2}). The racial makeup of the city was 98.1% White, 0.3% African American, 0.5% Native American, 0.3% Asian, 0.1% from other races, and 0.7% from two or more races. Hispanic or Latino of any race were 1.9% of the population.

There were 513 households, of which 20.9% had children under the age of 18 living with them, 44.2% were married couples living together, 6.4% had a female householder with no husband present, 4.1% had a male householder with no wife present, and 45.2% were non-families. 40.5% of all households were made up of individuals, and 18.3% had someone living alone who was 65 years of age or older. The average household size was 1.98 and the average family size was 2.64.

The median age in the city was 50.4 years. 17.4% of residents were under the age of 18; 5.3% were between the ages of 18 and 24; 18.8% were from 25 to 44; 29.9% were from 45 to 64; and 28.7% were 65 years of age or older. The gender makeup of the city was 49.0% male and 51.0% female.

=== 2000 census ===
As of the census of 2000, there were 1,089 people, 489 households, and 290 families living in the city. The population density was 807.6 inhabitants per square mile (311.8/km^{2}). There were 637 housing units at an average density of 472.4 per square mile (182.4/km^{2}). The racial makeup of the city was 98.26% White, 0.28% Native American, 1.01% Asian, 0.18% from other races, and 0.28% from two or more races. Hispanic or Latino of any race were 0.83% of the population.

There were 489 households, out of which 22.1% had children under the age of 18 living with them, 50.1% were married couples living together, 5.9% had a female householder with no husband present, and 40.5% were non-families. 38.0% of all households were made up of individuals, and 24.5% had someone living alone who was 65 years of age or older. The average household size was 2.09 and the average family size was 2.77.

In the city, the population was spread out, with 19.5% under the age of 18, 4.6% from 18 to 24, 18.7% from 25 to 44, 23.3% from 45 to 64, and 33.9% who were 65 years of age or older. The median age was 50 years. For every 100 females, there were 88.1 males. For every 100 females age 18 and over, there were 79.3 males.

The median income for a household in the city was $26,382, and the median income for a family was $39,643. Males had a median income of $27,500 versus $15,882 for females. The per capita income for the city was $15,922. About 8.5% of families and 13.6% of the population were below the poverty line, including 18.4% of those under age 18 and 15.4% of those age 65 or over.

== Notable people ==
- G. Raymond Carlson, General Superintendent of Assemblies of God
- Martin Olav Sabo, U.S. Congressman from Minnesota

== Climate ==
According to the Köppen Climate Classification system, Crosby has a warm-summer humid continental climate, abbreviated "Dfb " on climate maps. Based on climate data in the years 1991–2020, the average date for the first autumn frost is September 23 while the last spring frost is usually around May 14, giving Crosby, North Dakota an average growing season of 132 days.

Climate data for Crosby, North Dakota, 1991–2020 normals, extremes 1907–present
Month	Jan	Feb	Mar	Apr	May	Jun	Jul	Aug	Sep	Oct	Nov	Dec	Year
Record high °F (°C)	56 (13)	66 (19)	81 (27)	92 (33)	103 (39)	105 (41)	111 (44)	107 (42)	103 (39)	91 (33)	71 (22)	61 (16)	111 (44)
Mean maximum °F (°C)	42.6 (5.9)	43.0 (6.1)	59.4 (15.2)	76.7 (24.8)	86.2 (30.1)	90.9 (32.7)	93.4 (34.1)	94.6 (34.8)	89.7 (32.1)	76.2 (24.6)	56.6 (13.7)	42.4 (5.8)	96.8 (36.0)
Mean daily maximum °F (°C)	19.5 (−6.9)	23.9 (−4.5)	37.1 (2.8)	54.5 (12.5)	67.2 (19.6)	75.3 (24.1)	81.0 (27.2)	80.8 (27.1)	69.9 (21.1)	53.4 (11.9)	35.7 (2.1)	23.2 (−4.9)	51.8 (11.0)
Daily mean °F (°C)	9.7 (−12.4)	13.8 (−10.1)	26.5 (−3.1)	41.5 (5.3)	53.7 (12.1)	62.8 (17.1)	68.1 (20.1)	66.9 (19.4)	56.8 (13.8)	42.2 (5.7)	26.4 (−3.1)	14.1 (−9.9)	40.2 (4.6)
Mean daily minimum °F (°C)	0.0 (−17.8)	3.8 (−15.7)	15.9 (−8.9)	28.6 (−1.9)	40.2 (4.6)	50.4 (10.2)	55.2 (12.9)	53.1 (11.7)	43.7 (6.5)	31.0 (−0.6)	17.1 (−8.3)	5.0 (−15.0)	28.7 (−1.8)
Mean minimum °F (°C)	−25.6 (−32.0)	−20.4 (−29.1)	−8.6 (−22.6)	12.6 (−10.8)	26.1 (−3.3)	40.5 (4.7)	46.8 (8.2)	43.2 (6.2)	29.5 (−1.4)	14.5 (−9.7)	−3.2 (−19.6)	−19.2 (−28.4)	−29.0 (−33.9)
Record low °F (°C)	−45 (−43)	−47 (−44)	−34 (−37)	−13 (−25)	11 (−12)	24 (−4)	33 (1)	25 (−4)	9 (−13)	−7 (−22)	−25 (−32)	−40 (−40)	−47 (−44)
Average precipitation inches (mm)	0.52 (13)	0.40 (10)	0.60 (15)	0.95 (24)	2.23 (57)	3.23 (82)	2.68 (68)	1.66 (42)	1.77 (45)	1.10 (28)	0.53 (13)	0.43 (11)	16.10 (409)
Average snowfall inches (cm)	8.8 (22)	4.6 (12)	5.2 (13)	3.3 (8.4)	1.1 (2.8)	0.0 (0.0)	0.0 (0.0)	0.0 (0.0)	0.0 (0.0)	3.1 (7.9)	5.6 (14)	9.0 (23)	40.7 (103)
Average precipitation days (≥ 0.01 in)	6.4	4.4	5.6	6.1	8.2	11.4	8.5	6.5	6.2	6.1	5.4	6.3	81.1
Average snowy days (≥ 0.1 in)	5.8	3.9	3.5	1.5	0.3	0.0	0.0	0.0	0.0	1.4	3.6	5.5	25.5
Source: NOAA

== Infrastructure ==
There are three churches in downtown Crosby and one cemetery, located near Crosby Municipal Airport.

== Education ==
Crosby has both an elementary school and a high school, both of which are part of the Divide County School District. The elementary school serves grades K-6 and the high school serves grades 7-12. Divide County School District also welcomes students from other towns, including Noonan, Ambrose, Fortuna, and Colombus, which is in the bordering county of Burke.

The high school has a marching band.

== Transportation ==
Crosby has a local airport, Crosby Municipal Airport, which is open to the public and operates from sunrise to sunset. The airport is approximately one mile north of the city and has an estimated elevation of 1952.7 ft (595.2 m). Its ARTCC is Salt Lake City Center, in Utah.

Nearby roads include 102nd St NW, a highway, and 4th St SE.

== Government ==
Bert Anderson served as mayor until 2014. On December 4, 2023, Troy Vassen resigned as mayor after a city council meeting as he was planning to move out of the city. On December 20, 2023, Vassen's cousin and president of the Crosby City Council Kjell Vassen was appointed to act as mayor until June 11, 2024 when James Jacobs defeated him in the city's mayoral election.
