= Divide County, North Dakota =

County in North Dakota, United States

- County
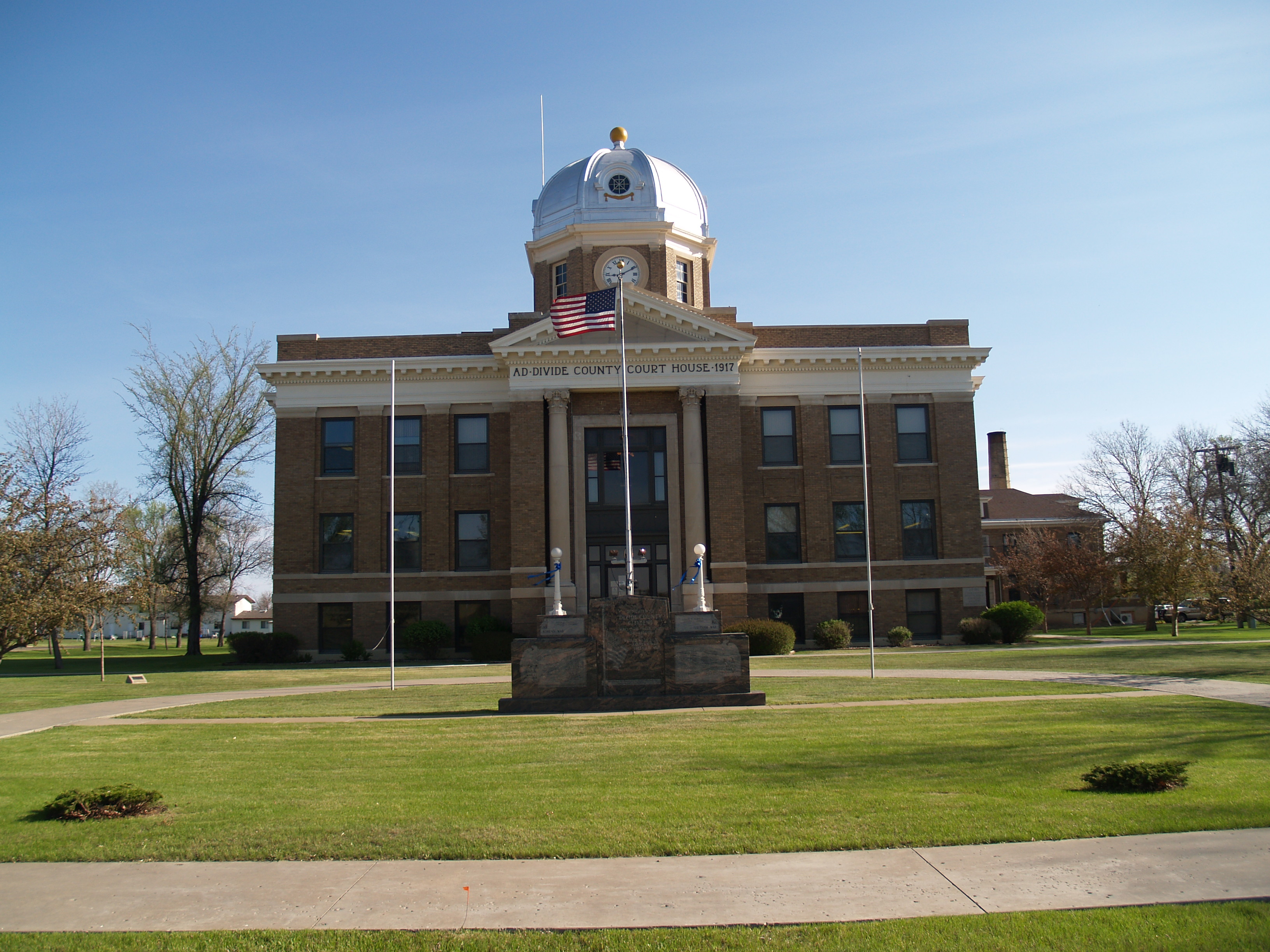
- The Divide County Courthouse in Crosby

- Location within the U.S. state of North Dakota
- Coordinates: 48.814754°N 103.509326°W
- Country: United States
- State: North Dakota
- Founded: November 8, 1910 (created); December 9, 1910 (organized)
- Seat: Crosby
- Largest city: Crosby

Area
  - Total: 1,294.596 sq mi (3,352.99 km^{2})
  - Land: 1,261.130 sq mi (3,266.31 km^{2})
  - Water: 33.466 sq mi (86.68 km^{2}) 2.59%

Population (2020)
  - Total: 2,195
  - Estimate (2025): 2,110 ▼
  - Density: 1.684/sq mi (0.650/km^{2})
- Time zone: UTC−6 (Central)
  - Summer (DST): UTC−5 (CDT)
- Area code: 701
- Congressional district: At-large
- Website: dividecountynd.org

Divide County is a county in the U.S. state of North Dakota. As of the 2020 census, the population was 2,195, and was estimated to be 2,110 in 2025. The county seat and the largest city is Crosby.

== History ==
During the election on November 8, 1910, the voters of Williams County determined that the county should be divided into a northern and a southern county. The vote was affirmative; the southern portion retained the Williams name; the newly created county was named "Divide", with Crosby as the seat. The county government was effected on December 9 of that year, and the county's boundaries have remained unchanged since that time. Most histories attribute the county name to its "division" from Williams County, though the county's location on the Laurentian Divide, separating runoff waters between Hudson Bay and Gulf of Mexico, may have been involved.

In 1911, Divide County was the site of one of the deadliest tornadoes in North Dakota's recorded history, causing four known deaths.

== Geography ==
Divide County lies at the northwest corner of North Dakota. Its northern boundary line abuts the south boundary line of Canada, opposite Saskatchewan, and its west boundary line abuts the east boundary line of the state of Montana. The terrain of Divide County consists of semi-arid rolling hills, dotted with lakes and ponds, partially devoted to agriculture. The terrain generally slopes to the east; the northern part also slopes to the north while the southern part slopes to the south.

According to the United States Census Bureau, the county has a total area of 1,294.596 square miles (3,352.99 km^{2}), of which 1,261.130 square miles (3,266.31 km^{2}) is land and 33.466 square miles (86.68 km^{2}) (2.59%) is water. It is the 24th largest county in North Dakota by total area.

Divide County is one of several western North Dakota counties with significant exposure to the Bakken Formation in the Williston Basin.

=== Major highways ===
- U.S. Highway 85
- North Dakota Highway 5
- North Dakota Highway 40
- North Dakota Highway 42

=== Adjacent counties and rural municipalities ===
- Rural Municipality (RM) of Lake Alma No. 8, Saskatchewan (SK) – northwest
- RM of Souris Valley No. 7, SK – north
- RM of Cambria No. 6, SK – north
- RM of Estevan No. 5, SK – northeast
- Burke County – east
- Williams County – south
- Sheridan County, Montana – west

=== Lakes ===
- Bright Water Lake
- McCone Lake
- Miller Lake
- Musta Lake
- North Lake
- Rattler Lake
- Round Lake (part)
- Willow Lake

== Demographics ==
Historical population
Census	Pop.	Note	%±
1910	6,015		—
1920	9,637		60.2%
1930	9,636		0.0%
1940	7,086		−26.5%
1950	5,967		−15.8%
1960	5,566		−6.7%
1970	4,564		−18.0%
1980	3,494		−23.4%
1990	2,899		−17.0%
2000	2,283		−21.2%
2010	2,071		−9.3%
2020	2,195		6.0%
2025 (est.)	2,110	▼	−3.9%
U.S. Decennial Census; 1790–1960 1900–1990; 1990–2000 2010–2020

As of the fourth quarter of 2024, the median home value in Divide County was $183,409.

As of the 2023 American Community Survey, there are 935 estimated households in Divide County with an average of 2.24 persons per household. The county has a median household income of $89,297. Approximately 9.8% of the county's population lives at or below the poverty line. Divide County has an estimated 59.2% employment rate, with 20.4% of the population holding a bachelor's degree or higher and 88.4% holding a high school diploma.

The top five reported ancestries (people were allowed to report up to two ancestries, thus the figures will generally add to more than 100%) were English (98.8%), Spanish (0.0%), Indo-European (0.6%), Asian and Pacific Islander (0.3%), and Other (0.2%).

The median age in the county was 47.3 years.

Divide County, North Dakota – racial and ethnic composition
Note: the US Census treats Hispanic/Latino as an ethnic category. This table excludes Latinos from the racial categories and assigns them to a separate category. Hispanics/Latinos may be of any race.

Race / ethnicity (NH = non-Hispanic)	Pop. 1980	Pop. 1990	Pop. 2000	Pop. 2010	Pop. 2020
White alone (NH)	3,480 (99.60%)	2,876 (99.21%)	2,251 (98.60%)	2,006 (96.86%)	2,024 (92.21%)
Black or African American alone (NH)	0 (0.00%)	1 (0.03%)	0 (0.00%)	5 (0.24%)	23 (1.05%)
Native American or Alaska Native alone (NH)	9 (0.26%)	9 (0.31%)	3 (0.13%)	10 (0.48%)	17 (0.77%)
Asian alone (NH)	1 (0.03%)	6 (0.21%)	12 (0.53%)	6 (0.29%)	11 (0.50%)
Pacific Islander alone (NH)	—	—	0 (0.00%)	0 (0.00%)	4 (0.18%)
Other race alone (NH)	3 (0.09%)	0 (0.00%)	0 (0.00%)	0 (0.00%)	3 (0.14%)
Mixed race or multiracial (NH)	—	—	3 (0.13%)	14 (0.68%)	60 (2.73%)
Hispanic or Latino (any race)	1 (0.03%)	7 (0.24%)	14 (0.61%)	30 (1.45%)	53 (2.41%)
Total	3,494 (100.00%)	2,899 (100.00%)	2,283 (100.00%)	2,071 (100.00%)	2,195 (100.00%)

=== 2024 estimate ===
As of the 2024 estimate, there were 2,124 people and 935 households residing in the county. There were 1,399 housing units at an average density of 1.11 per square mile (0.4/km^{2}). The racial makeup of the county was 92.3% White (88.5% NH White), 1.9% African American, 1.1% Native American, 1.9% Asian, 0.2% Pacific Islander, _% from some other races and 2.5% from two or more races. Hispanic or Latino people of any race were 4.1% of the population.

=== 2020 census ===
As of the 2020 census, there were 2,195 people, 965 households, and 597 families residing in the county. The population density was 1.7 inhabitants per square mile (0.7/km^{2}). There were 1,397 housing units at an average density of 1.11 per square mile (0.4/km^{2}); 30.9% were vacant. Among occupied housing units, 74.4% were owner-occupied and 25.6% were renter-occupied. The homeowner vacancy rate was 4.0% and the rental vacancy rate was 25.5%.

Of the residents, 23.0% were under the age of 18 and 22.9% were 65 years of age or older; the median age was 43.5 years. For every 100 females there were 110.7 males, and for every 100 females age 18 and over there were 114.1 males.

Of the 965 households, 26.9% had children under the age of 18 living with them and 17.3% had a female householder with no spouse or partner present. About 33.3% of all households were made up of individuals and 14.2% had someone living alone who was 65 years of age or older.

The racial makeup of the county was 93.6% White, 1.0% Black or African American, 0.9% American Indian and Alaska Native, 0.5% Asian, 0.2% from some other race, and 3.6% from two or more races. Hispanic or Latino residents of any race comprised 2.4% of the population.

=== 2010 census ===
As of the 2010 census, there were 2,071 people, 977 households, and 584 families residing in the county. The population density was 1.6 inhabitants per square mile (0.6/km^{2}). There were 1,324 housing units at an average density of 1.05 per square mile (0.4/km^{2}). The racial makeup of the county was 98.02% White, 0.24% African American, 0.53% Native American, 0.34% Asian, 0.00% Pacific Islander, 0.05% from some other races and 0.82% from two or more races. Hispanic or Latino people of any race were 1.45% of the population.

In terms of ancestry, 57.7% were Norwegian, 30.3% were German, 8.5% were Irish, 5.2% were Swedish, and 2.9% were American.

There were 977 households, 19.8% had children under the age of 18 living with them, 51.2% were married couples living together, 4.5% had a female householder with no husband present, 40.2% were non-families, and 36.6% of all households were made up of individuals. The average household size was 2.05 and the average family size was 2.66. The median age was 51.4 years.

The median income for a household in the county was $48,152 and the median income for a family was $65,000. Males had a median income of $42,341 versus $27,596 for females. The per capita income for the county was $28,462. About 9.4% of families and 14.0% of the population were below the poverty line, including 40.7% of those under age 18 and 5.7% of those age 65 or over.

Among the population claiming adherence to a particular religious organization, 80.6% claimed adherence to the Evangelical Lutheran Church in America (ELCA) in 2010. This rate is the highest such rate for the ELCA among all counties in the United States.

== Places of interest ==
Two petroglyphs are displayed at Writing Rock State Historical Site in Writing Rock Township.

== Communities ==
=== Cities ===
- Ambrose
- Crosby (county seat)
- Fortuna
- Noonan

=== Unincorporated communities ===
- Alkabo
- Colgan
- Juno
- Kermit
- Paulson
- Stady

=== Townships ===
- Alexandria
- Ambrose
- Blooming Prairie
- Blooming Valley
- Border
- Burg
- Clinton
- Coalfield
- Daneville
- De Witt
- Elkhorn
- Fertile Valley
- Fillmore
- Frazier
- Frederick
- Garnet
- Gooseneck
- Hawkeye
- Hayland
- Lincoln Valley
- Long Creek
- Mentor
- Palmer
- Plumer
- Sioux Trail
- Smoky Butte
- Stoneview
- Troy
- Twin Butte
- Upland
- Westby
- Writing Rock

== Politics ==
Divide County, though formerly a swing county, now leans heavily Republican. It has selected the Republican party candidate in every presidential election since 2000.

United States presidential election results for Divide County, North Dakota
Year	Republican		Democratic		Third party(ies)	
Year	No.	%	No.	%	No.	%
1912	404	28.59%	375	26.54%	634	44.87%
1916	707	39.41%	950	52.95%	137	7.64%
1920	2,438	80.81%	462	15.31%	117	3.88%
1924	743	30.43%	91	3.73%	1,608	65.85%
1928	1,963	60.36%	1,250	38.44%	39	1.20%
1932	817	24.02%	2,374	69.78%	211	6.20%
1936	585	16.54%	2,212	62.56%	739	20.90%
1940	1,437	44.32%	1,771	54.63%	34	1.05%
1944	1,225	44.19%	1,513	54.58%	34	1.23%
1948	981	48.14%	887	43.52%	170	8.34%
1952	1,999	70.79%	807	28.58%	18	0.64%
1956	1,296	51.99%	1,194	47.89%	3	0.12%
1960	1,348	51.95%	1,243	47.90%	4	0.15%
1964	779	34.15%	1,498	65.67%	4	0.18%
1968	1,032	50.39%	914	44.63%	102	4.98%
1972	1,230	60.29%	774	37.94%	36	1.76%
1976	881	44.54%	1,057	53.44%	40	2.02%
1980	1,267	66.06%	509	26.54%	142	7.40%
1984	1,165	63.32%	626	34.02%	49	2.66%
1988	869	49.15%	875	49.49%	24	1.36%
1992	515	31.79%	634	39.14%	471	29.07%
1996	488	36.42%	637	47.54%	215	16.04%
2000	443	55.79%	306	38.54%	45	5.67%
2004	751	59.23%	487	38.41%	30	2.37%
2008	630	55.70%	464	41.03%	37	3.27%
2012	733	63.08%	385	33.13%	44	3.79%
2016	867	71.12%	245	20.10%	107	8.78%
2020	904	75.21%	265	22.05%	33	2.75%
2024	914	76.10%	253	21.07%	34	2.83%

== See also ==
- National Register of Historic Places listings in Divide County, North Dakota
- Westby, Montana was founded in North Dakota in Divide County and then was moved to Montana.
