= Rural Municipality of Cambria No. 6 =

Rural municipality in Saskatchewan, Canada

Cambria No. 6
- Rural municipality
- Rural Municipality of Cambria No. 6
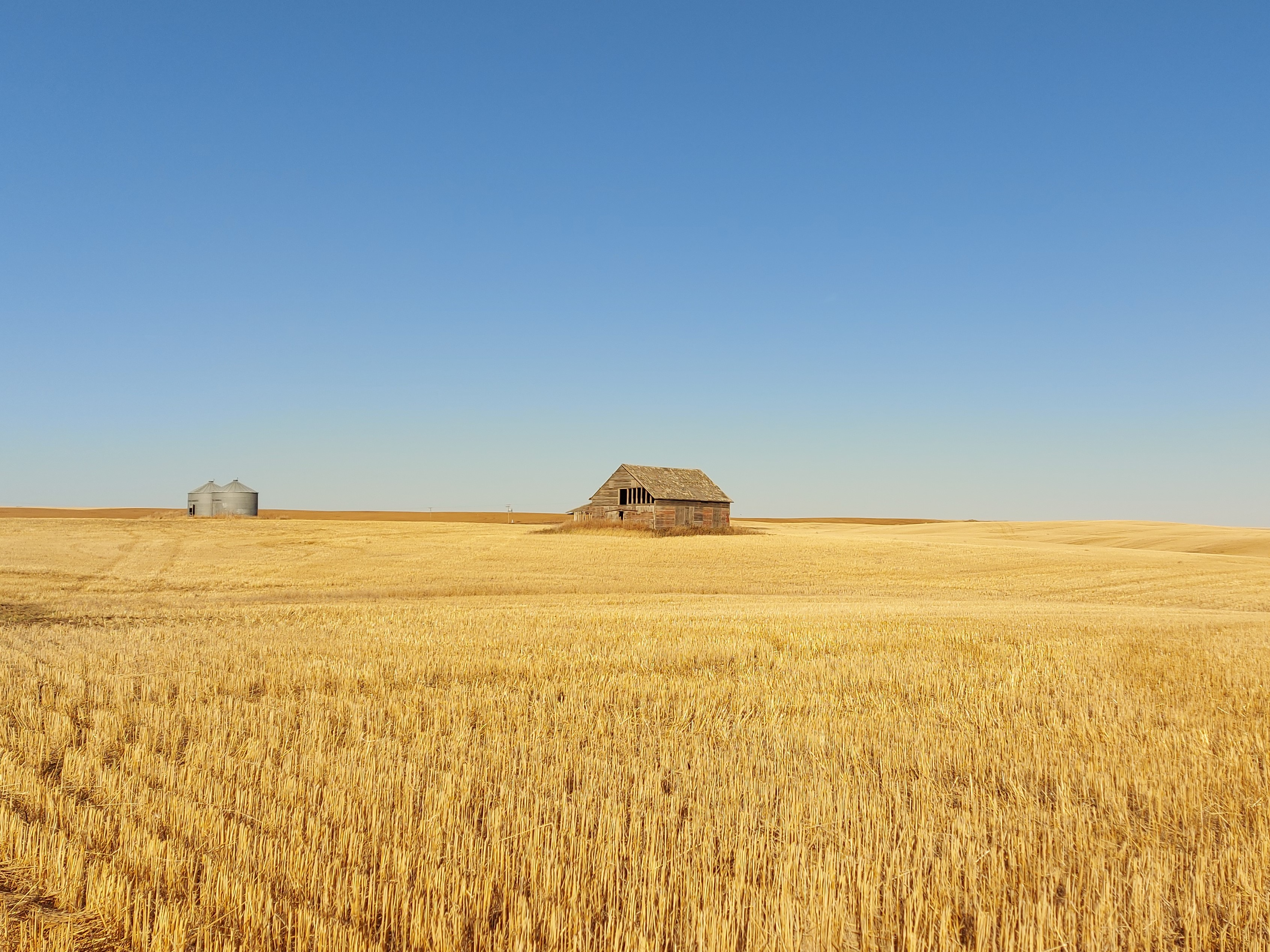
- RM of Cambria

- Location of the RM of Cambria No. 6 in Saskatchewan
- Coordinates: 49.129°N 103.427°W
- Country: Canada
- Province: Saskatchewan
- Census division: 2
- SARM division: 1
- Federal riding: Souris—Moose Mountain
- Provincial riding: Estevan
- Formed: December 13, 1909

Government
  - Reeve: Darwin Daae
  - Governing body: RM of Cambria No. 6 Council
  - Administrator: Monica Kovach
  - Office location: Torquay

Area (2016)
  - Land: 814.14 km^{2} (314.34 sq mi)

Population (2016)
  - Total: 309
  - Density: 0.4/km^{2} (1.0/sq mi)
- Time zone: CST
  - Summer (DST): CST
- Postal code: S0C 2L0
- Area codes: 306 and 639

The Rural Municipality of Cambria No. 6 (2016 population: 309) is a rural municipality (RM) in the Canadian province of Saskatchewan within Census Division No. 2 and SARM Division No. 1. Located in the southeast portion of the province, it is adjacent to the United States border, neighbouring Divide County in North Dakota.

== History ==
The RM of Cambria No. 6 incorporated as a rural municipality on December 13, 1909.

== Geography ==
=== Communities and localities ===
The following urban municipalities are surrounded by the RM.

Villages

- Torquay

The following unincorporated hamlets are located within the RM.

Localities

- Marienthal
- Outram
- Rafferty

== Demographics ==
Population history (1981–2016)
Year	Pop.	±%
1981	456	—
1986	426	−6.6%
1991	391	−8.2%
1996	344	−12.0%
2001	291	−15.4%
2006	268	−7.9%
2011	304	+13.4%
2016	309	+1.6%
Source: Statistics Canada via Saskatchewan Bureau of Statistics

In the 2021 Census of Population conducted by Statistics Canada, the RM of Cambria No. 6 had a population of 277 living in 106 of its 117 total private dwellings, a change of −10.4% from its 2016 population of 309. With a land area of 813.31 km^{2} (314.02 sq mi), it had a population density of 0.3/km^{2} (0.9/sq mi) in 2021.

In the 2016 Census of Population, the RM of Cambria No. 6 recorded a population of 309 living in 107 of its 115 total private dwellings, a 1.6% change from its 2011 population of 304. With a land area of 814.14 km^{2} (314.34 sq mi), it had a population density of 0.4/km^{2} (1.0/sq mi) in 2016.

== Government ==
The RM of Cambria No. 6 is governed by an elected municipal council and an appointed administrator that meets on the second Wednesday of every month. The reeve of the RM is Darwin Daae while its administrator is Monica Kovach. The RM's office is located in Torquay.

== See also ==
- List of rural municipalities in Saskatchewan
