= Writing Rock State Historic Site =

State historic site in North Dakota

Coordinates: 48°46′51″N 103°51′33″W

Writing Rock State Historic Site, located twelve miles (19 km) northeast of Grenora, North Dakota in Divide County near the Montana border, is the site of two large granite boulders, carved with petroglyphs featuring thunderbirds, mythological creatures that are of importance in the culture of Plains Indian tribes.

The age of the carvings has not been determined, but they could date from 1000 to about 1700, according to the North Dakota Historical Society. While the meaning of many of the images is lost to history, both Sioux and Assiniboine peoples considered the site sacred. For many years, that smaller boulder was kept at the University of North Dakota, but in 1965, it was returned to what had by then become the Writing Rock State Historic Site. Today, the two boulders are enclosed in a shelter and protected by iron bars at the historic site. Recreational facilities at the historic site include picnic tables in a grove of trees, picnic shelters, a building with a kitchen, fireplace, playground equipment, restrooms, and a parking lot.

== Petroglyphs and carvings ==
The design on the rocks are clearly American Indian by design. Similar rock art sites are found in Roche Percee and Kamsack, Saskatchewan; Longview and Writing-on-Stone Provincial Park, Alberta; Pictograph Cave near Billings, Montana; Dinwoody, Wyoming; Ludlow Cave at Buffalo, South Dakota; and at numerous archeological sites in the upper midwestern United States. Thunderbirds, mythological creatures responsible for lightning and thunder, are central to stories told by Algonquian-speaking and Siouan-speaking tribes. Many Plains Indians such as Plains Cree, Plains Ojibwa, Gros Ventre, Crow, Mandan, and Hidatsa used thunderbirds in their art.

The design appears on prehistoric artifacts such as shell and bone pendants and pottery, as well as on rock art. Most of these artifacts on the northern plains date from A.D. 1000 to A.D. 1700. The larger of the two granite boulders measures four and one-half feet high and four feet wide. A massive, flying bird surrounded by interconnected lines and circles covers the flattest side of the boulder. The second, smaller rock is three and one-half feet long, two feet wide, and one and one-half feet high. It displays a smaller, flying bird connected to circles and abstract lines. A second bird, which is missing its head, flies above the other designs. All of the motifs were pecked by pounding a hard rock against the boulders or were ground into the surfaces.
