= Ambrose, North Dakota =

- City
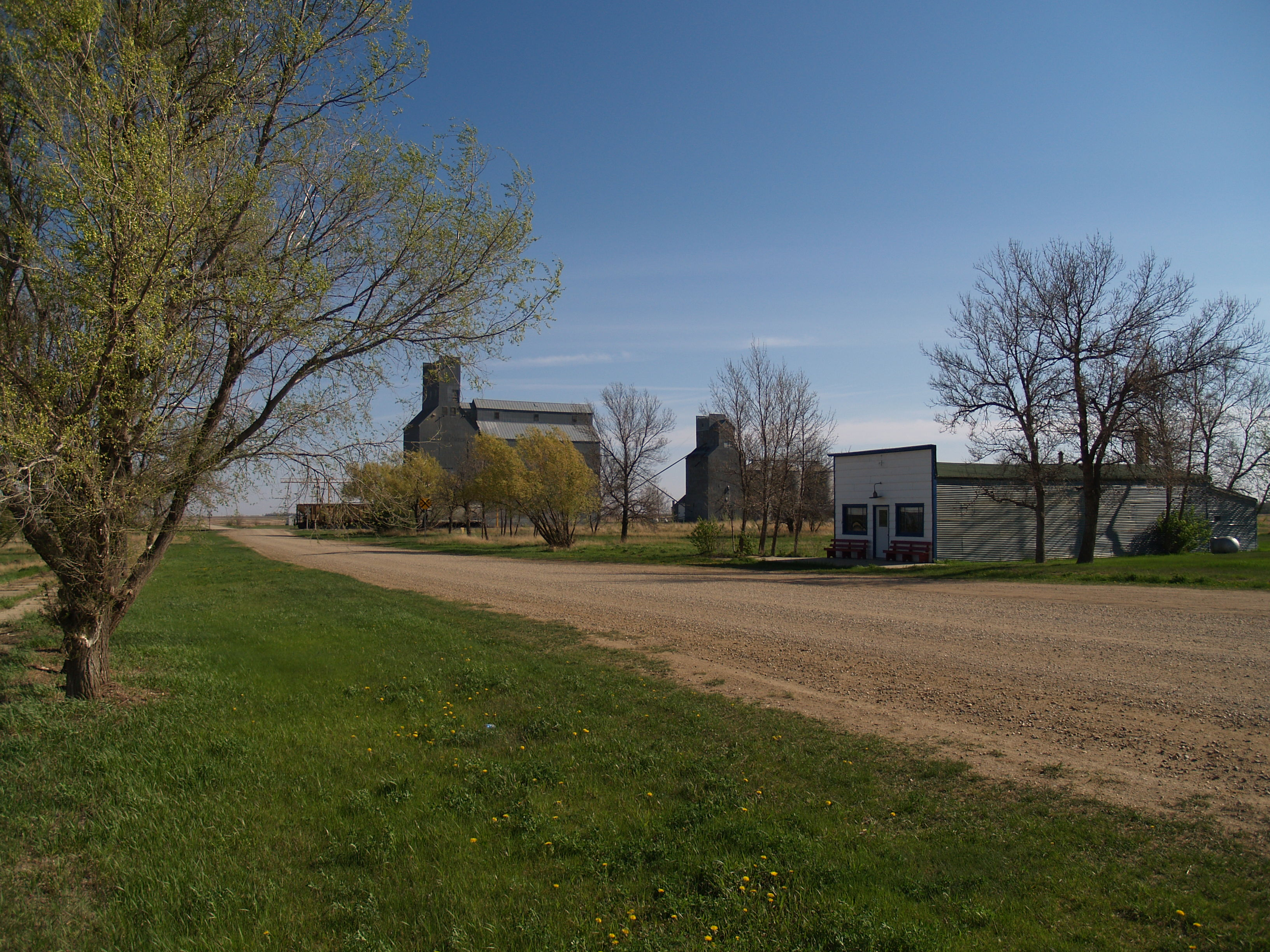
- Buildings in Ambrose
- Interactive map of Ambrose, North Dakota
- Location within North Dakota
- Coordinates: 48.9559°N 103.4813°W
- Country: United States
- State: North Dakota
- County: Divide
- Founded: 1906

Government
  - Mayor/Auditor: Tabitha Jozwiak
  - Alderman: Travis Ness; Richard Sortland; Robert McPhail

Area
  - Total: 1.010 sq mi (2.615 km^{2})
  - Land: 1.010 sq mi (2.615 km^{2})
  - Water: 0 sq mi (0.000 km^{2}) 0.00%
- Elevation: 2,064 ft (629 m)

Population (2020)
  - Total: 24
  - Estimate (2025): 16
  - Density: 24/sq mi (9.2/km^{2})
- Time zone: UTC–6 (Central (CST))
  - Summer (DST): UTC–5 (CDT)
- ZIP Code: 58833
- Area code: 701
- FIPS code: 38-01860
- GNIS feature ID: 1035907
- Website: ambrosend.com

Ambrose is a city in Divide County, North Dakota, United States. The population was 24 as of the 2020 census, and was estimated at 16 in 2025.

== History ==
Ambrose was laid out in 1906 on the Soo Railway. The city was named in honor of a railroad worker. A post office has been in operation at Ambrose since 1906.

== Geography ==
According to the United States Census Bureau, the city has a total area of 1.010 square miles (2.62 km^{2}), all land.

== Climate ==
This climatic region is typified by large seasonal temperature differences, with warm to hot (and often humid) summers and cold (sometimes severely cold) winters. According to the Köppen Climate Classification system, Ambrose has a humid continental climate, abbreviated "Dfb" on climate maps.

== Demographics ==
Historical population
Census	Pop.	Note	%±
1910	320		—
1920	389		21.6%
1930	334		−14.1%
1940	294		−12.0%
1950	286		−2.7%
1960	220		−23.1%
1970	109		−50.5%
1980	60		−45.0%
1990	48		−20.0%
2000	23		−52.1%
2010	26		13.0%
2020	24		−7.7%
2025 (est.)	16		−33.3%
U.S. Decennial Census; 2020 Census

=== 2020 census ===
As of the 2020 census, there were 24 people, 12 households, and 5 families residing in the city. The population density was 23.76 inhabitants per square mile (9.2/km^{2}). There were 39 housing units at an average density of 39.61 per square mile (15.3/km^{2}). The racial makeup of the city was 70.83% White, 0.00% African American, 0.00% Native American, 4.17% Asian, 4.17% Pacific Islander, 4.17% from some other races and 16.67% from two or more races. Hispanic or Latino people of any race were 16.67% of the population.

=== 2010 census ===
As of the 2010 census, there were 26 people, 18 households, and 4 families residing in the city. The population density was 24.3 inhabitants per square mile (9.4/km^{2}). There were 29 housing units at an average density of 27.1 per square mile (10.5/km^{2}). The racial makeup of the city was 100.00% White.

There were 18 households, of which 11.1% had children under the age of 18 living with them, 11.1% were married couples living together, 5.6% had a female householder with no husband present, 5.6% had a male householder with no wife present, and 77.8% were non-families. 72.2% of all households were made up of individuals, and 16.7% had someone living alone who was 65 years of age or older. The average household size was 1.44 and the average family size was 2.25.

The median age in the city was 53.5 years. 7.7% of residents were under the age of 18; 7.6% were between the ages of 18 and 24; 19.1% were from 25 to 44; 53.8% were from 45 to 64; and 11.5% were 65 years of age or older. The gender makeup of the city was 57.7% male and 42.3% female.

=== 2000 census ===
As of the 2000 census, there were 23 people, 13 households, and 5 families residing in the city. The population density was 21.6 people per square mile (8.3/km^{2}). There were 41 housing units at an average density of 38.5 per square mile (14.9/km^{2}). The racial makeup of the city was 100.00% White.

There were 13 households, out of which 15.4% had children under the age of 18 living with them, 23.1% were married couples living together, 15.4% had a female householder with no husband present, and 61.5% were non-families. 61.5% of all households were made up of individuals, and 7.7% had someone living alone who was 65 years of age or older. The average household size was 1.77 and the average family size was 3.00.

In the city, the population was spread out, with 21.7% under the age of 18, 4.3% from 18 to 24, 17.4% from 25 to 44, 39.1% from 45 to 64, and 17.4% who were 65 years of age or older. The median age was 46 years. For every 100 females, there were 109.1 males. For every 100 females age 18 and over, there were 157.1 males.

The median income for a household in the city was $56,250, and the median income for a family was $75,138. Males had a median income of $55,417 versus $8,750 for females. The per capita income for the city was $19,679. There were no families and 15.8% of the population living below the poverty line, including no under eighteens and 100.0% of those over 64.

== See also ==
- Ambrose–Torquay Border Crossing
