= Noonan, North Dakota =

City in the United States

- City
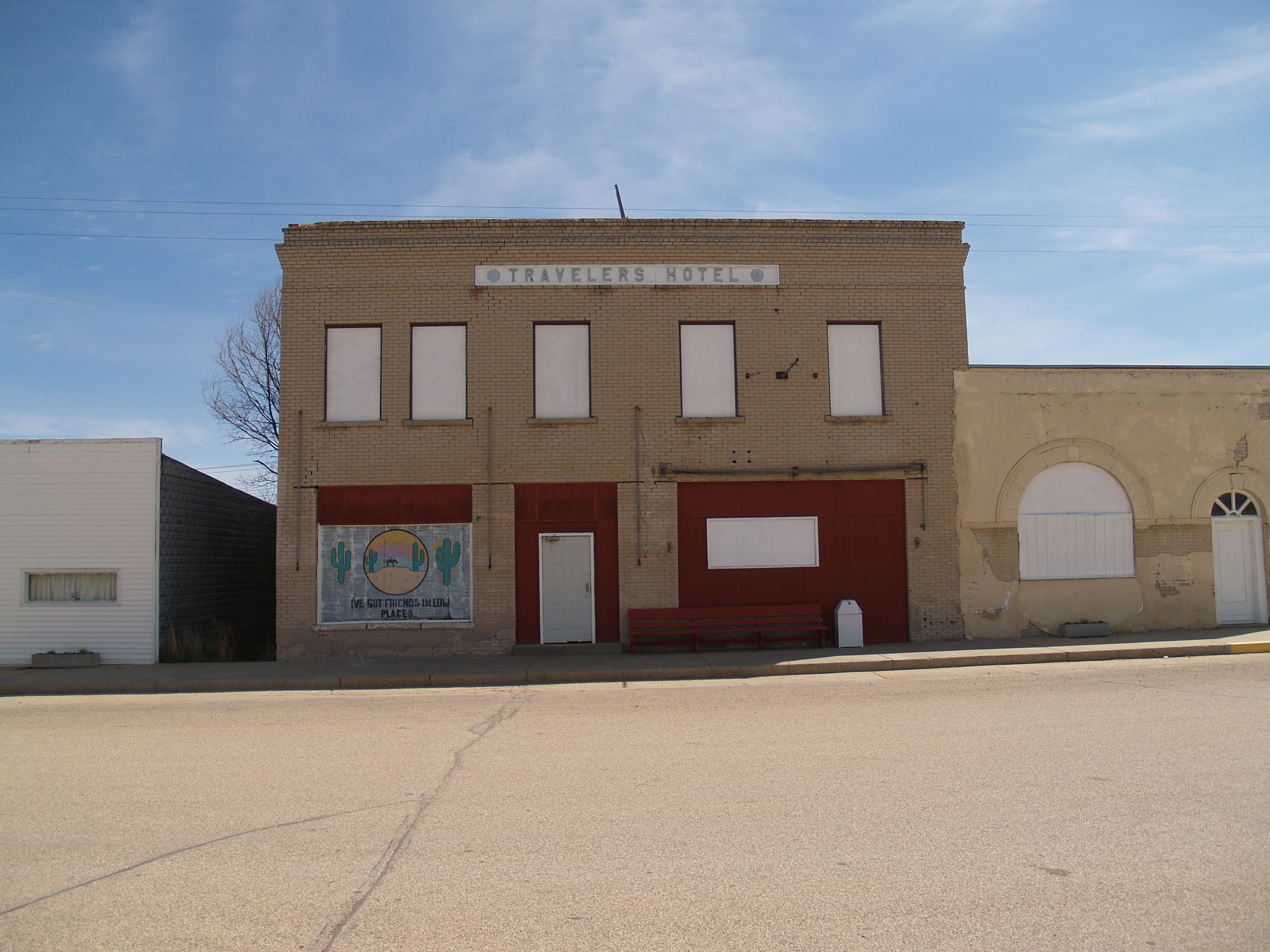
- The Travelers Hotel in Noonan
- Nickname: White City
- Location of Noonan, North Dakota
- Coordinates: 48°53′24″N 103°00′36″W
- Country: United States
- State: North Dakota
- County: Divide
- Founded: 1907

Government
  - Mayor: Doug Clemens

Area
  - Total: 0.30 sq mi (0.78 km^{2})
  - Land: 0.29 sq mi (0.76 km^{2})
  - Water: 0.012 sq mi (0.03 km^{2})
- Elevation: 1,965 ft (599 m)

Population (2020)
  - Total: 137
  - Estimate (2022): 137
  - Density: 468.9/sq mi (181.04/km^{2})
- Time zone: UTC-6 (Central (CST))
  - Summer (DST): UTC-5 (CDT)
- ZIP code: 58765
- Area code: 701
- FIPS code: 38-57220
- GNIS feature ID: 1036187

Noonan is a city in Divide County, North Dakota, United States. The population was 137 at the 2020 census.

Noonan was founded in 1907 and named after a family that had business, farm, and coal interests in the area. It was once known as "The White City" because of an ordinance requiring all buildings to be painted white. It is the birthplace of Gerald W. VandeWalle, who served a record-longest 45 years on the North Dakota Supreme Court beginning in 1978, including 26 years as its Chief Justice, from 1993 to 2019.

== Geography ==
According to the United States Census Bureau, the city has a total area of 0.31 square miles (0.80 km^{2}), of which 0.30 square miles (0.78 km^{2}) is land and 0.01 square miles (0.03 km^{2}) is water.

== Demographics ==
Historical population
Census	Pop.	Note	%±
1910	153		—
1920	376		145.8%
1930	423		12.5%
1940	520		22.9%
1950	551		6.0%
1960	625		13.4%
1970	403		−35.5%
1980	283		−29.8%
1990	231		−18.4%
2000	154		−33.3%
2010	121		−21.4%
2020	137		13.2%
2022 (est.)	137		0.0%
U.S. Decennial Census; 2020 Census

=== 2010 census ===
As of the census of 2010, there were 121 people, 67 households, and 32 families residing in the city. The population density was 403.3 inhabitants per square mile (155.7/km^{2}). There were 107 housing units at an average density of 356.7 per square mile (137.7/km^{2}). The racial makeup of the city was 95.9% White, 1.7% Native American, 1.7% Asian, and 0.8% from two or more races. Hispanic or Latino of any race were 0.8% of the population.

There were 67 households, of which 13.4% had children under the age of 18 living with them, 41.8% were married couples living together, 6.0% had a male householder with no wife present, and 52.2% were non-families. 46.3% of all households were made up of individuals, and 13.5% had someone living alone who was 65 years of age or older. The average household size was 1.81 and the average family size was 2.53.

The median age in the city was 50.4 years. 13.2% of residents were under the age of 18; 8.3% were between the ages of 18 and 24; 19% were from 25 to 44; 37.2% were from 45 to 64; and 22.3% were 65 years of age or older. The gender makeup of the city was 52.9% male and 47.1% female.

=== 2000 census ===
As of the census of 2000, there were 154 people, 76 households, and 30 families residing in the city. The population density was 563.6 inhabitants per square mile (217.6/km^{2}). There were 116 housing units at an average density of 424.6 per square mile (163.9/km^{2}). The racial makeup of the city was 100.00% White.

There were 76 households, out of which 14.5% had children under the age of 18 living with them, 38.2% were married couples living together, 1.3% had a female householder with no husband present, and 60.5% were non-families. 53.9% of all households were made up of individuals, and 30.3% had someone living alone who was 65 years of age or older. The average household size was 1.74 and the average family size was 2.70.

In the city, the population was spread out, with 11.0% under the age of 18, 4.5% from 18 to 24, 20.1% from 25 to 44, 25.3% from 45 to 64, and 39.0% who were 65 years of age or older. The median age was 58 years. For every 100 females, there were 100.0 males. For every 100 females age 18 and over, there were 95.7 males.

The median income for a household in the city was $20,000, and the median income for a family was $46,250. Males had a median income of $27,500 versus $13,333 for females. The per capita income for the city was $21,065. About 7.1% of families and 14.8% of the population were below the poverty line, including none of those under the age of eighteen and 24.4% of those 65 or over.

== Climate ==
This climatic region is typified by large seasonal temperature differences, with warm to hot (and often humid) summers and cold (sometimes severely cold) winters. According to the Köppen Climate Classification system, Noonan has a humid continental climate, abbreviated "Dfb" on climate maps.

== Dump site ==
In March 2014, news reports indicated that the town included an illegal dump of radioactive mining waste. An abandoned gas station was found to contain hundreds of "filter socks ... used to capture the solids in flowback water during hydraulic fracturing", which trap naturally-occurring radioactive debris.
