= List of census-designated places in North Dakota =

Map of the United States with North Dakota highlighted

Census-designated places (CDPs) are unincorporated communities lacking elected municipal officers and boundaries with legal status. North Dakota has 47 census-designated places.

== Census-designated places ==
Population data based on the 2025 estimates.

2025 Rank	CDP	2025 Estimate	2020 Census	Change	County
1	Minot Air Force Base	4,809	5,017	−4.15%	Ward
2	Grand Forks Air Force Base	2,072	2,027	+2.22%	Grand Forks
3	Belcourt	1,687	1,510	+11.72%	Rolette
4	Shell Valley	1,099	1,146	−4.10%	Rolette
5	Green Acres	966	605	+59.67%	Rolette
6	Fort Totten	882	1,160	−23.97%	Benson
7	Cannon Ball	857	864	−0.81%	Sioux
8	Mandaree	605	691	−12.45%	McKenzie
9	Trenton	535	488	+9.63%	Williams
10	East Dunseith	347	500	−30.60%	Rolette
11	White Shield	268	363	−26.17%	McLean
12	Apple Valley	220	194	+13.40%	Burleigh
13	Harmon	199	259	−23.17%	Morton
14	Logan	159	247	−35.63%	Ward
15	East Fairview	155	73	+112.33%	McKenzie
16	Four Bears Village	151	500	−69.80%	McKenzie
17	McGregor	140	47	+197.87%	Williams
18	McLeod	140	22	+536.36%	Ransom
19	Brooktree Park	137	76	+80.26%	Cass
20	Porcupine	134	197	−31.98%	Sioux
21	Blacktail	123	61	+101.64%	Williams
22	Menoken	110	78	+41.03%	Burleigh
23	Manning	91	47	+93.62%	Dunn
24	Ruthville	89	151	−41.06%	Ward
25	Selz	82	40	+105.00%	Pierce
26	Caledonia	78	37	+110.81%	Traill
27	Driscoll	60	68	−11.76%	Burleigh
28	Foxholm	55	56	−1.79%	Ward
29	Erie	51	54	−5.56%	Cass
30	Heimdal	47	16	+193.75%	Wells
31	Sutton	46	17	+170.59%	Griggs
32	Wheatland	44	92	−52.17%	Cass
33	Dahlen	29	17	+70.59%	Nelson
34	Spiritwood	28	29	−3.45%	Stutsman
35	Long Creek	27	104	−74.04%	Williams
36	De Lamere	24	25	−4.00%	Sargent
37	Embden	17	41	−58.54%	Cass
38	Auburn	15	31	−51.61%	Walsh
39	Denhoff	15	13	+15.38%	Sheridan
40	Englevale	14	36	−61.11%	Ransom
41	Nash	10	13	−23.08%	Walsh
42	Raleigh	10	14	−28.57%	Grant
43	Heil	9	15	−40.00%	Grant
44	Bantry	6	6	0.00%	McHenry
45	Churchs Ferry	6	9	−33.33%	Ramsey
46	Larson	6	9	−33.33%	Burke
47	Jessie	3	22	−86.36%	Griggs
48	Barton (UC)	0	13	−100.00%	Pierce
49	Blanchard (UC)	0	16	−100.00%	Traill
50	Orrin (UC)	0	7	−100.00%	Pierce
51	Ypsilanti (UC)	0	109	−100.00%	Stutsman
