= Long Creek, North Dakota =

- Census-designated place
- Location within North Dakota Location within the United States
- Coordinates: 48°06′06″N 103°15′31″W
- Country: United States
- State: North Dakota
- County: Williams
- Township: Truax

Area
  - Total: 0.24 sq mi (0.61 km^{2})
  - Land: 0.24 sq mi (0.61 km^{2})
  - Water: 0 sq mi (0.00 km^{2})
- Elevation: 1,942 ft (592 m)

Population (2020)
  - Total: 104
  - Density: 441.3/sq mi (170.37/km^{2})
- Time zone: UTC-6 (Central (CST))
  - Summer (DST): UTC-5 (CDT)
- ZIP Code: 58843 (Epping)
- Area code: 701
- FIPS code: 38-47796
- GNIS feature ID: 2805289

Long Creek is an unincorporated community and census-designated place (CDP) in Williams County, North Dakota, United States. As of the 2020 census, Long Creek had a population of 104. It was first listed as a CDP prior to the 2020 census.

The CDP is on the southern edge of Williams County, on the northern shore of Lake Sakakawea, a large reservoir on the Missouri River. The community sits between two inlets to the lake: Long Creek to the north and Chris Creek to the south. Lewis and Clark State Park is to the north, across Long Creek. The CDP is bordered to the west by 119th Road NW. Williston is 22 miles (35 km) to the northwest by road.

== Demographics ==
Historical population
Census	Pop.	Note	%±
2020	104		—
U.S. Decennial Census

Long Creek first appeared as a census designated place in the 2020 U.S. census.

== Education ==
It is in the Williston Basin School District 7. Williston High School is the zoned high school.

It was formerly in the Williams County School District 8 (formerly New School District). The district only served grades K-8 and high school students were sent to Williston High, then in the Williston Public School District 1. District 8 also sent high school students to the Nesson School District in Ray and to the Tioga School District in Tioga. In 2021 District 8 merged with District 1 into the Williston Basin School District 7.
