= Blacktail, North Dakota =

- Census-designated place
- Location within North Dakota Location within the United States
- Coordinates: 48°25′58″N 103°44′24″W
- Country: United States
- State: North Dakota
- County: Williams
- Township: Blacktail

Area
  - Total: 0.57 sq mi (1.47 km^{2})
  - Land: 0.33 sq mi (0.86 km^{2})
  - Water: 0.24 sq mi (0.61 km^{2})
- Elevation: 2,090 ft (640 m)

Population (2020)
  - Total: 61
  - Density: 183.9/sq mi (71.02/km^{2})
- Time zone: UTC-6 (Central (CST))
  - Summer (DST): UTC-5 (CDT)
- ZIP Code: 58801 (Williston)
- Area code: 701
- FIPS code: 38-07456
- GNIS feature ID: 2805286

Blacktail is an unincorporated community and census-designated place (CDP) built around Blacktail Lake in Williams County, North Dakota, United States. It was first listed as a CDP prior to the 2020 census. As of the 2020 census, Blacktail had a population of 61.

The CDP is in northwestern Williams County, in the north-central part of Blacktail Township. It consists of residences built on the shore of Blacktail Lake, a small reservoir built on Blacktail Creek, a southeast-flowing tributary of the Little Muddy River, which flows south to the Missouri River at Williston, 25 miles (40 km) south of Blacktail.

== Demographics ==
Historical population
Census	Pop.	Note	%±
2020	61		—
U.S. Decennial Census

Blacktail first appeared as a census designated place in the 2020 U.S. census.

== Education ==
It is in the Williston Basin School District 7. Williston High School is the zoned high school.

It was formerly in the Williams County School District 8 (formerly New School District). The district only served grades K-8 and high school students were sent to Williston High, then in the Williston Public School District 1. District 8 also sent high school students to the Nesson School District in Ray and to the Tioga School District in Tioga. In 2021 District 8 merged with District 1 into the Williston Basin School District 7.
