= Hamlet, North Dakota =

Unincorporated community in North Dakota, US

Hamlet
- Unincorporated community
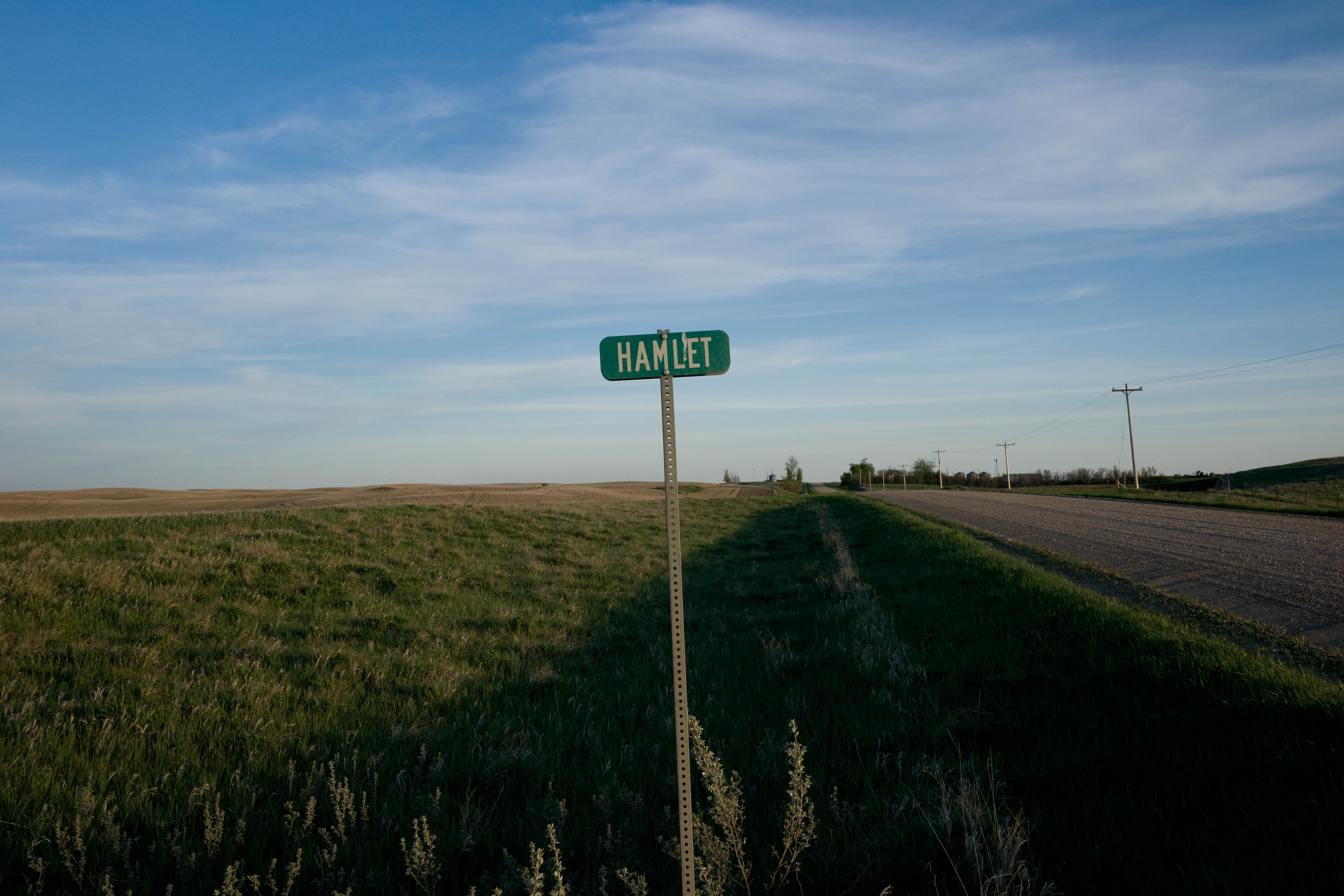
- Road sign

- Location within the state of North Dakota Hamlet (the United States)
- Coordinates: 48°37′43″N 103°03′06″W
- Country: United States
- State: North Dakota
- County: Williams
- Time zone: UTC-6 (Central (CST))
  - Summer (DST): UTC-5 (CDT)
- Area code: 701
- GNIS feature ID: 1029291

Hamlet is an unincorporated community northwest of McGregor, Williams County, North Dakota, United States.

== Geography ==
The community is located midway between Wildrose and McGregor. It is in Big Meadow Township.

== History ==
Hamlet was originally a railroad station on the Great Northern Railway, and was named Hankey in honor of the first postmaster, Frank Hankey.

The population peaked in 1930, with 219 residents in 1930. However, the community went into decline and by 1940, there were just 75 residents. By 1960, there were just 25 residents. The Hamlet post office closed in 1975.

Today there are only a handful of residents, some grain elevators, and the remains of the public school.

Hamlet is not to be confused with a town of the same name: Hamlet, LaMoure County, North Dakota.

== Gallery ==
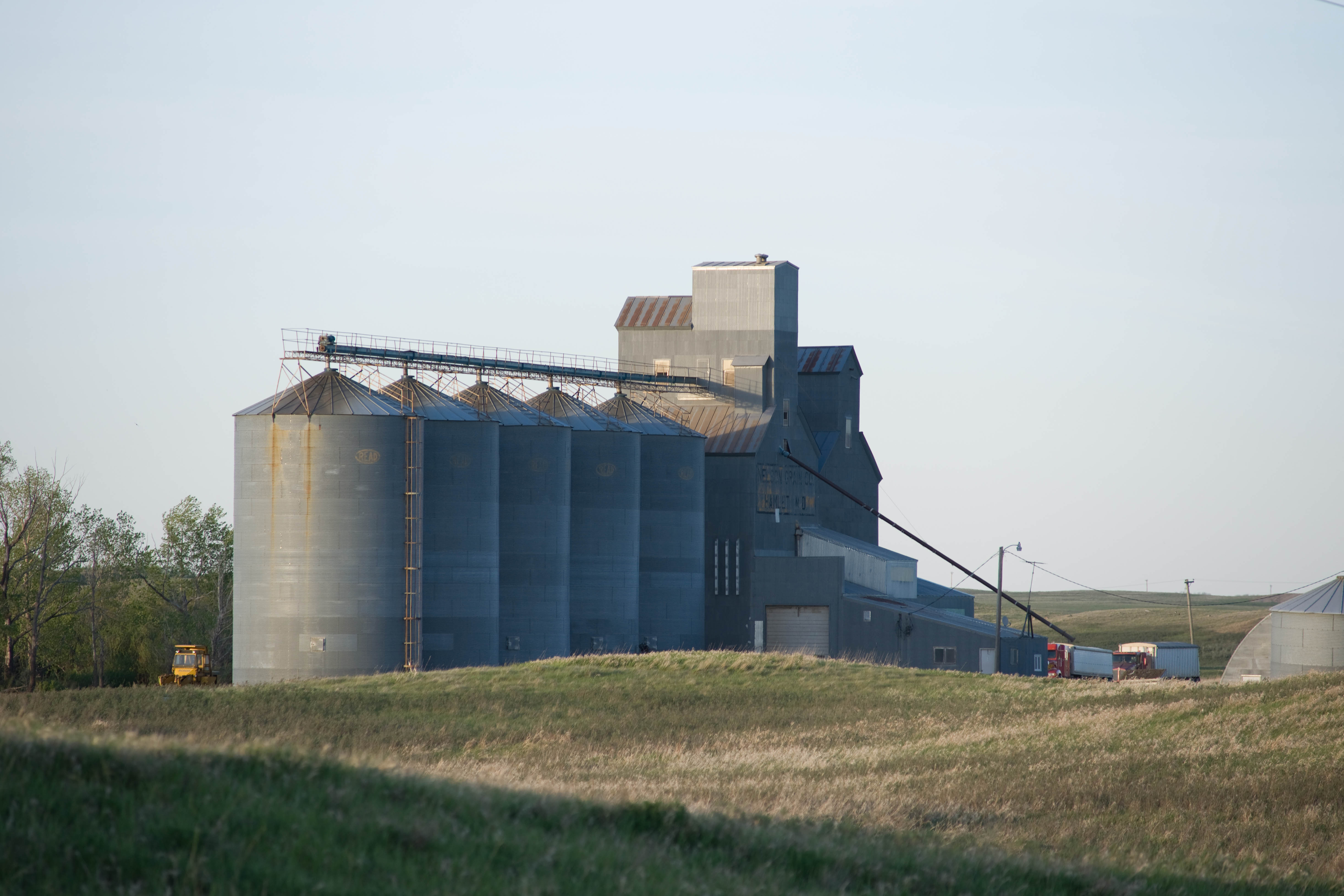
Grain silos

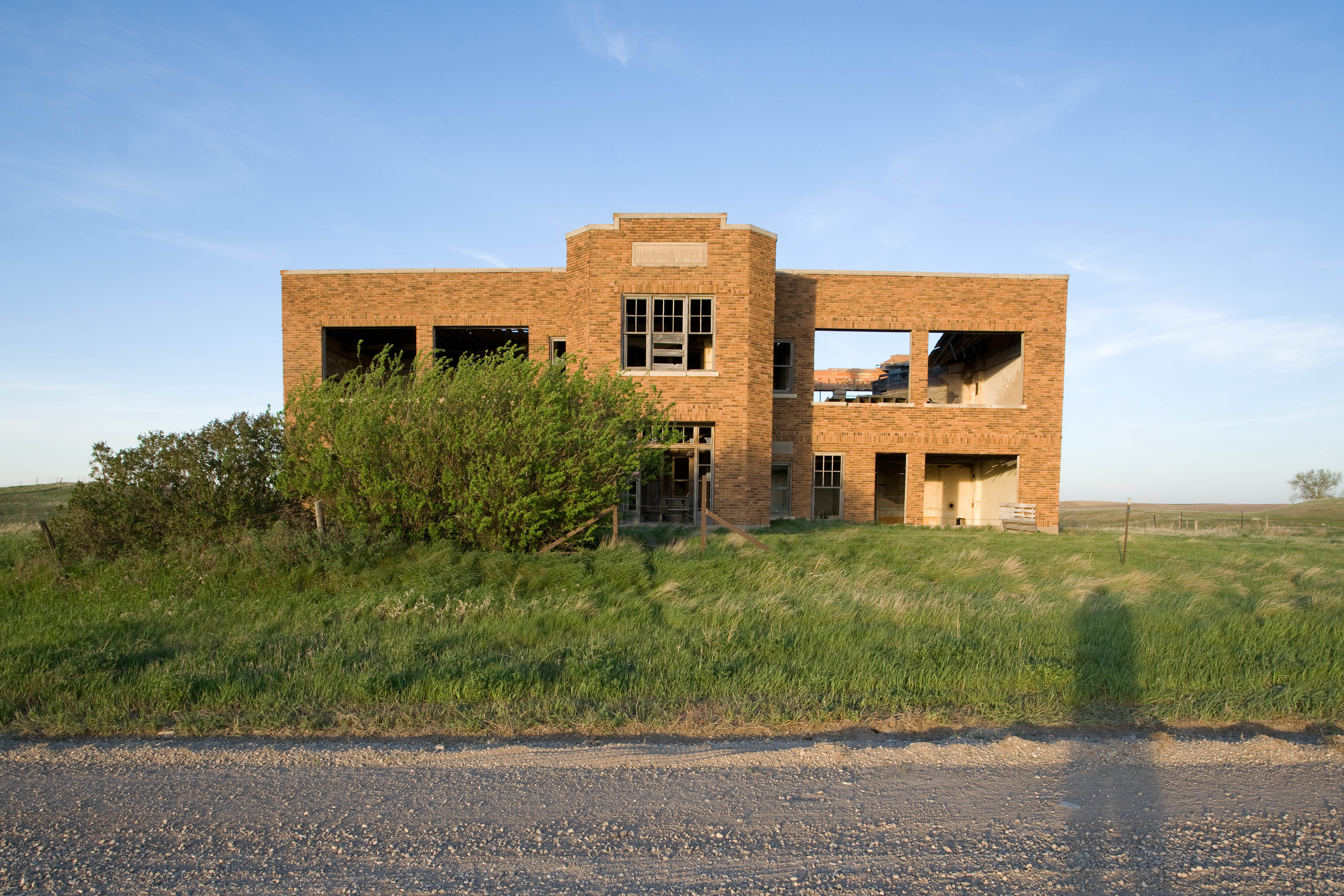
Vacant Hamlet School building

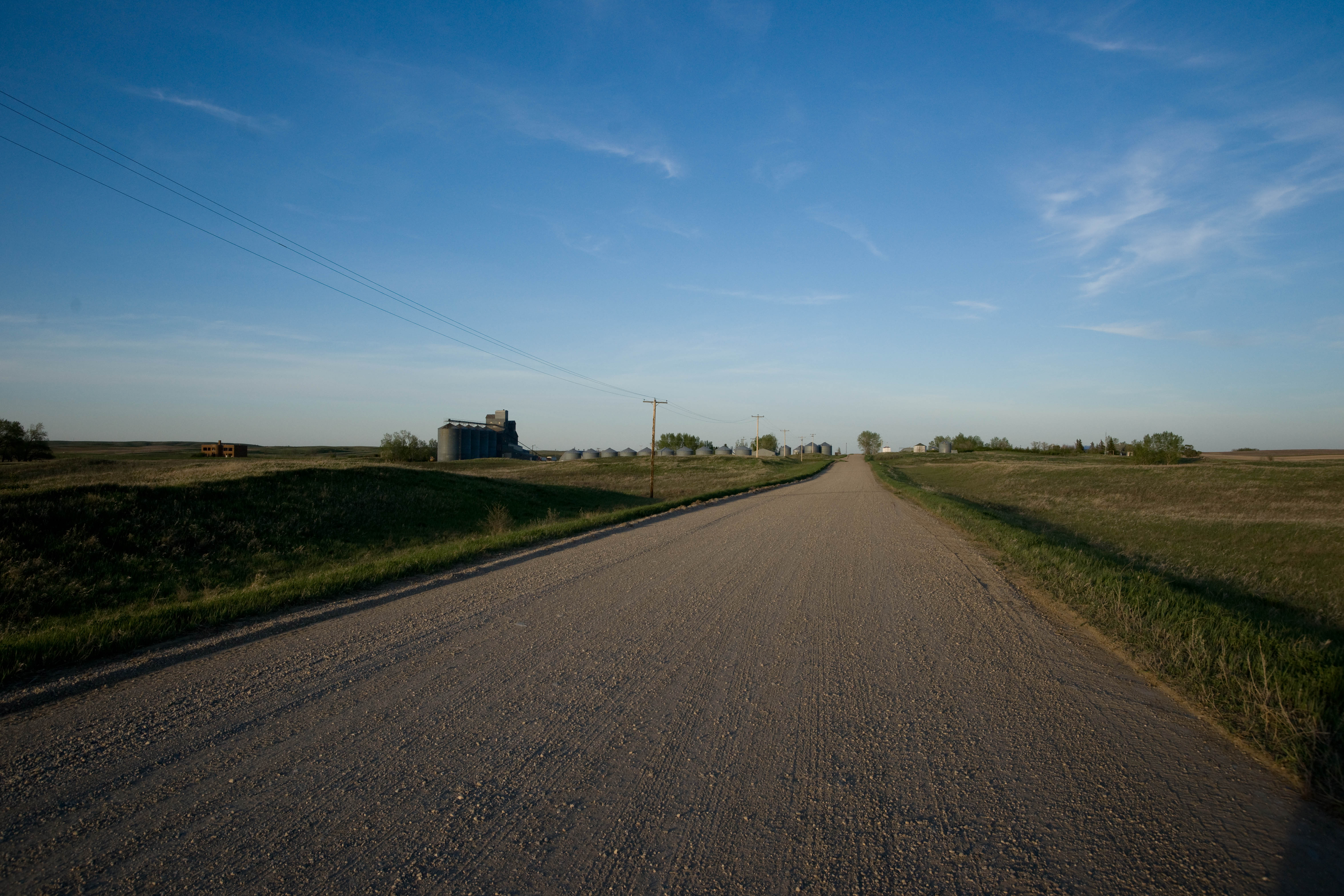
83rd Lane NW looking east

== See also ==
- Hanks, North Dakota
