= North Dakota Highway 40 =

State highway in North Dakota, U.S.

North Dakota Highway 40

Route information
- Maintained by NDDOT
- Length: 63.450 mi (102.113 km)
- Existed: 1926–present

Major junctions
- South end: US 2 near Tioga, North Dakota
- ND 50 near McGregor; ND 5 in Columbus and Noonan
- North end: Highway 47 at the Canadian border near Noonan

Location
- Country: United States
- State: North Dakota
- Counties: Williams, Burke, Divide

Highway system
- North Dakota State Highway System; Interstate; US; State
| ← ND 38 | → ND 41 |

North Dakota Highway 40 (ND 40) is a north–south highway located in northwestern North Dakota. The 63.450-mile-long (102.113 km) route traverses an area from US Highway 2 (US 2) near Tioga, in eastern Williams County, to the Canadian border where it continues as Saskatchewan Highway 47 (Hwy 47) in northern Divide County.

== Route description ==
ND 40 begins at a junction with US 2 south of Tioga, in eastern Williams County. It passes through that town and then begins a brief concurrency with ND 50 in McGregor.

ND 40 and ND 50 together enter Burke County. ND 40 leaves the concurrency in Battleview by turning northward to ND 5 in Columbus, and then turns west to run concurrently with that highway.

ND 40, with ND 5, enters Divide County, and then ND 40 leaves the concurrency with a turn at Noonan, 15 miles (24 km) east of Crosby. While in Noonan, it crosses an alignment of railroad tracks before continuing north. About seven miles (11 km) later, ND 40 ends at the Canadian border. The road continues beyond the port of entry and the Noonan-Estevan Highway Border Crossing as Hwy 47 on its way to Estevan, Saskatchewan.

== Major intersections ==
| County | Location | mi | km | Destinations | Notes |
|---|---|---|---|---|---|
| Williams | | 0.000 | 0.000 | US 2 – Williston, Stanley, Minot | Southern terminus |
| Williams | | 16.239 | 26.134 | ND 50 west – McGregor, Wildrose | Southern end of ND 50 concurrency |
| Burke | | 23.221 | 37.371 | ND 50 east – Powers Lake | Northern end of ND 50 concurrency |
| Burke | Columbus | 46.105 | 74.199 | ND 5 east – Lignite | Southern end of ND 5 concurrency |
| Divide | Noonan | 56.077 | 90.247 | ND 5 west – Crosby | Northern end of ND 5 concurrency |
| Divide | | 63.450 | 102.113 | Highway 47 | Northern terminus, continues north as Hwy 47 |
1.000 mi = 1.609 km; 1.000 km = 0.621 mi: Concurrency terminus

== Gallery ==
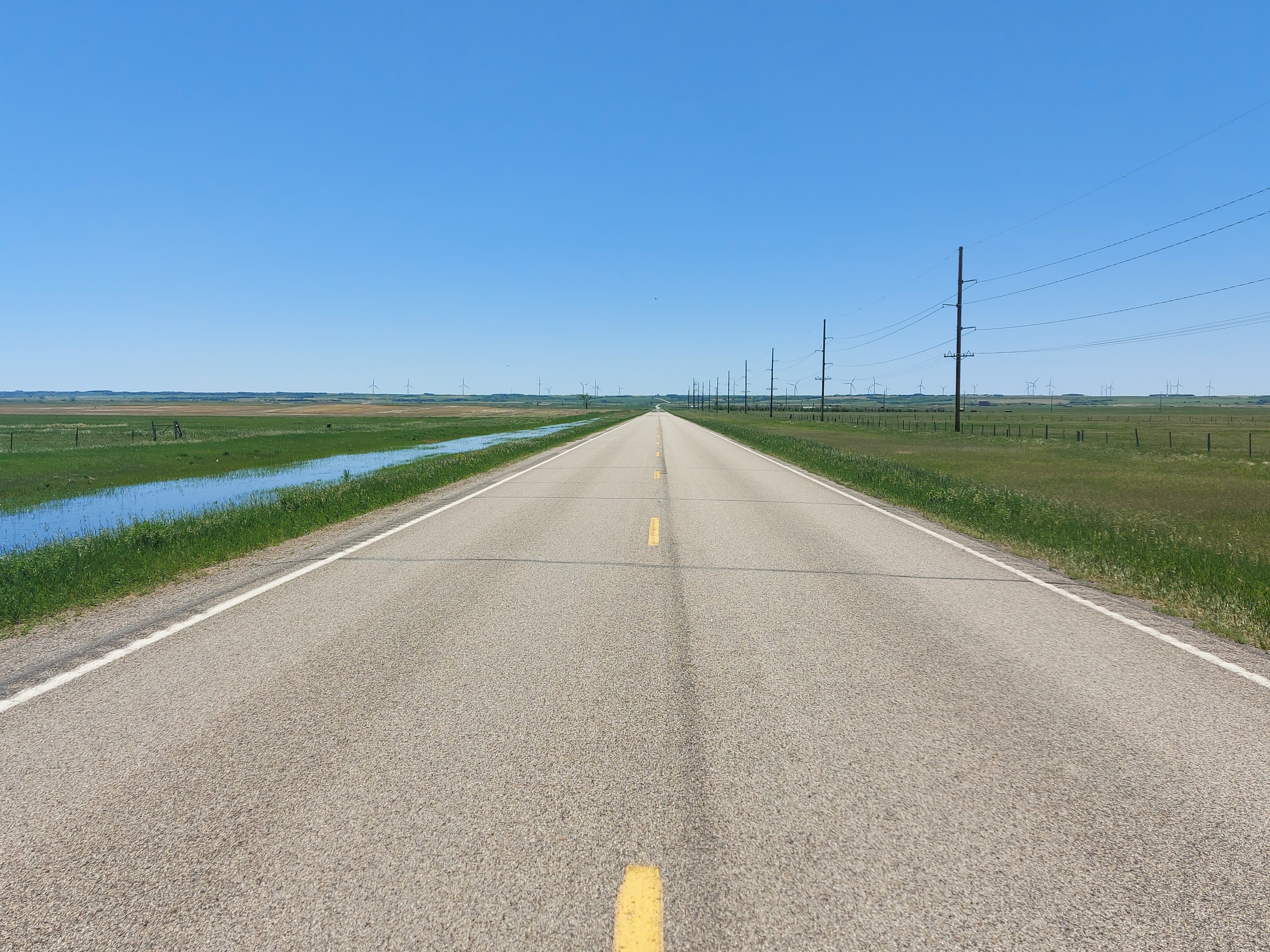
Highway 40 heading south near Columbus, ND

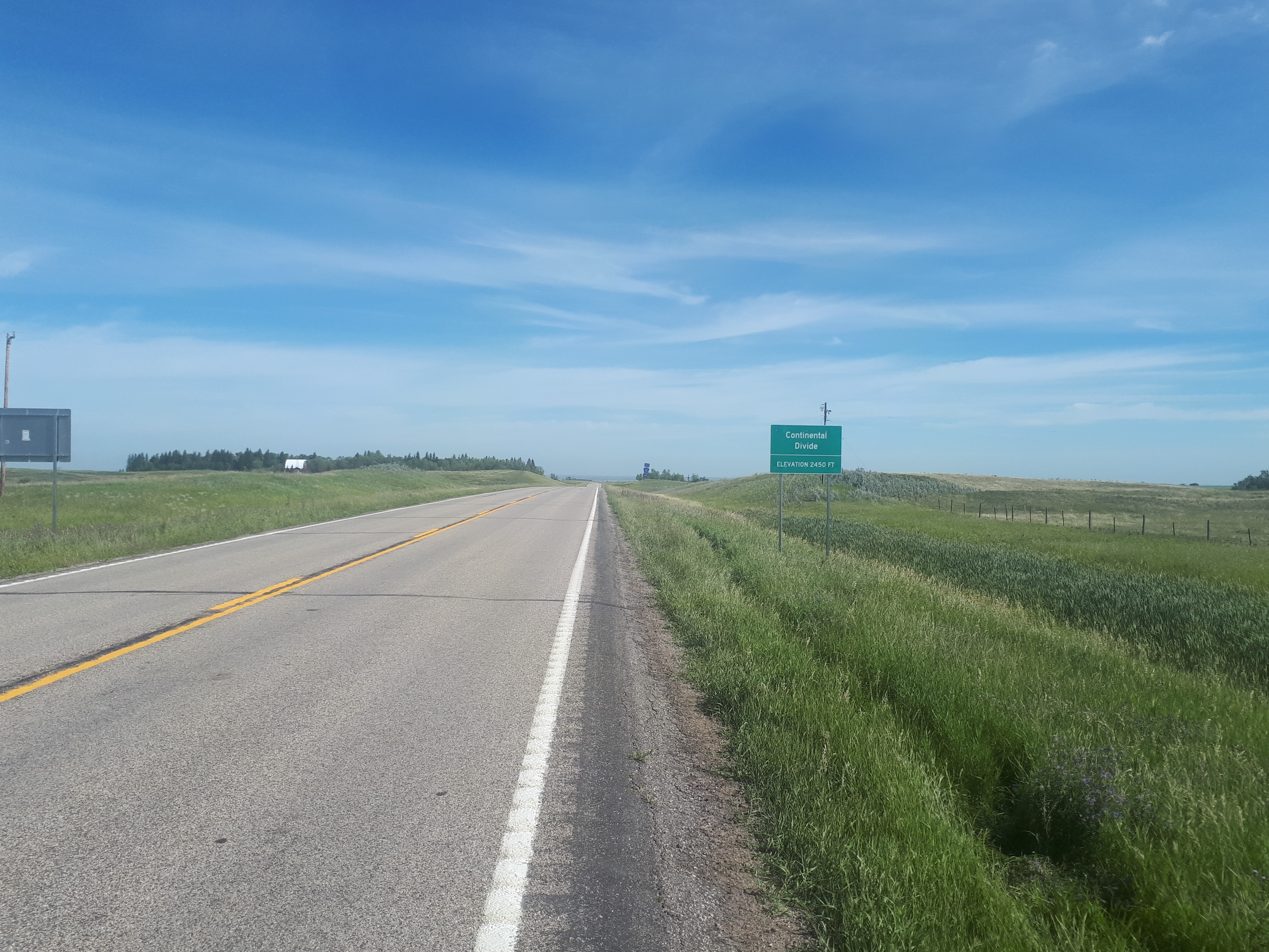
Laurentian Divide along Highway 40 looking north in Burke County, ND

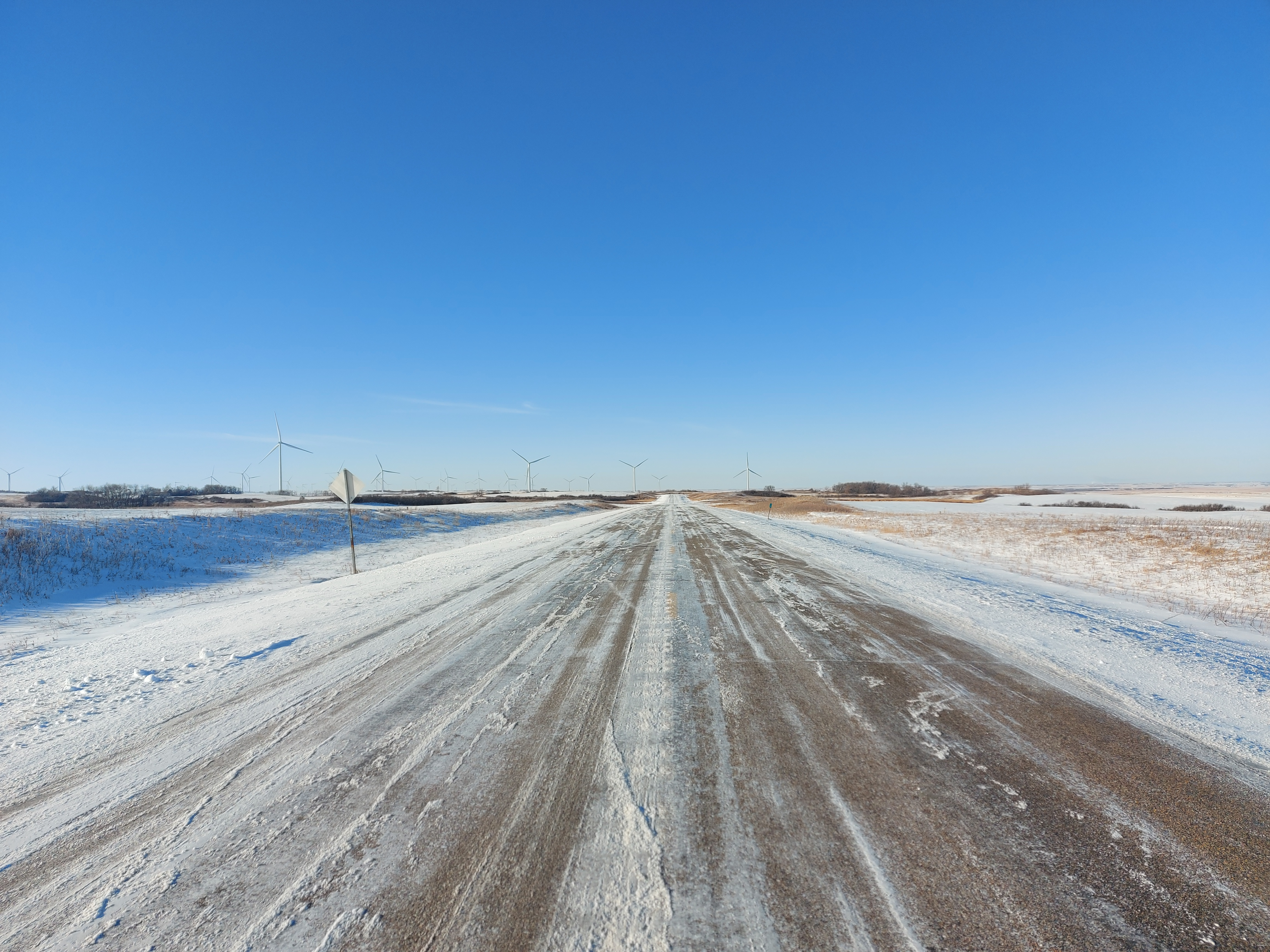
Highway 40 in North Dakota with wind turbines in the background

== See also ==
- List of Canada-United States border crossings
