= Zahl, North Dakota =

Zahl
- Unincorporated community
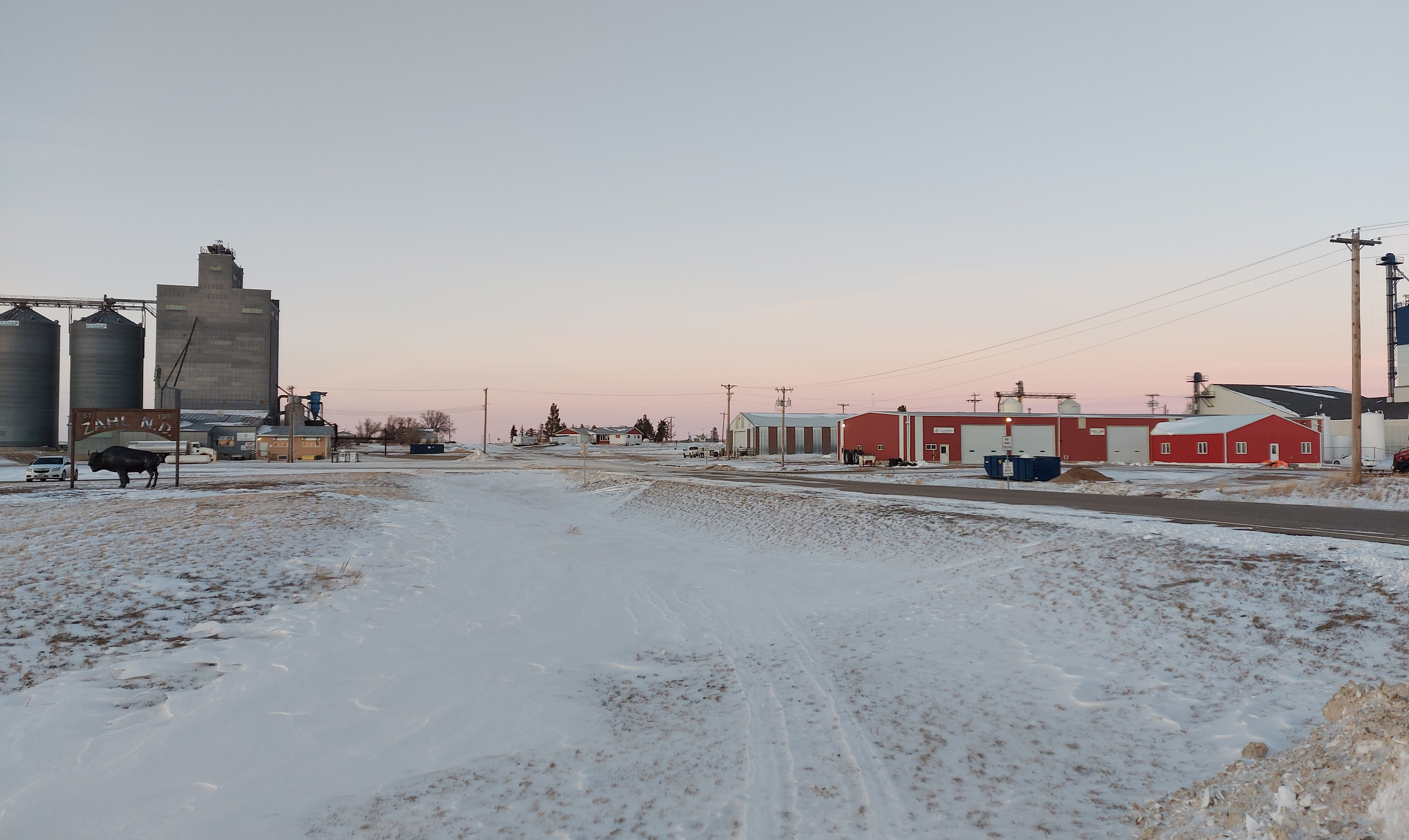
- Zahl, North Dakota

- Location within the state of North Dakota Zahl (the United States)
- Coordinates: 48°34′24″N 103°41′32″W
- Country: United States
- State: North Dakota
- County: Williams
- Elevation: 2,015 ft (614 m)
- Time zone: UTC-6 (Central (CST))
  - Summer (DST): UTC-5 (CDT)
- ZIP codes: 58856
- Area code: 701
- GNIS feature ID: 1032901

Zahl is an unincorporated community in northwestern Williams County, North Dakota, United States. It lies along North Dakota Highway 50 north of the city of Williston, the county seat of Williams County.

== History ==
A post office called Zahl has been in operation since 1905. The community bears the name of F. R. Zahl, an early settler.

== Climate ==
This climatic region is typified by large seasonal temperature differences, with warm to hot (and often humid) summers and cold (sometimes severely cold) winters. According to the Köppen Climate Classification system, Zahl has a humid continental climate, abbreviated "Dfb" on climate maps.
