= Harney Elementary School =

Harney Elementary School may refer to:

- Harney Elementary School, in Vancouver, Washington, United States, Vancouver Public Schools
- Harney Elementary School, in Williams County, North Dakota, United States (near Williston), Williams County School District 8
