= Appam, North Dakota =

Unincorporated community in North Dakota, United States

- Unincorporated community
- Location within North Dakota
- Coordinates: 48°34′12″N 103°35′20″W
- Country: United States
- State: North Dakota
- County: Williams
- Elevation: 2,014 ft (614 m)
- Time zone: UTC-6 (Central (CST))
  - Summer (DST): UTC-5 (CDT)
- Area code: 701
- GNIS feature ID: 1027721

Appam is an unincorporated community and virtual ghost town in Williams County, North Dakota, United States, in the northwestern corner of the state near the junction of U.S. 85 and ND Route 50.

== History ==
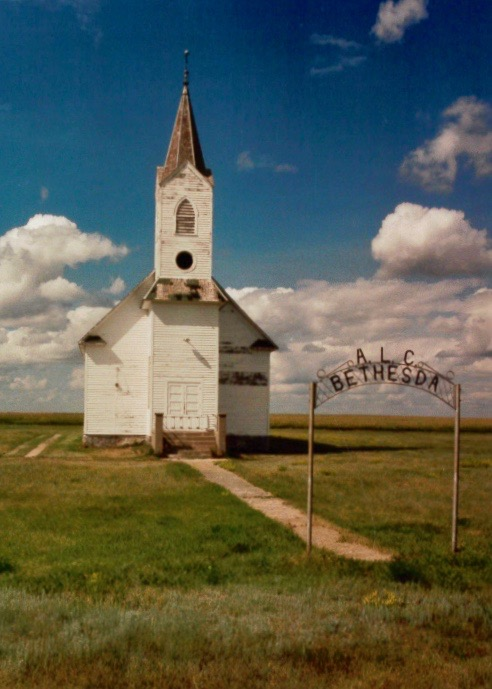
Abandoned Lutheran church near Appam, 1994

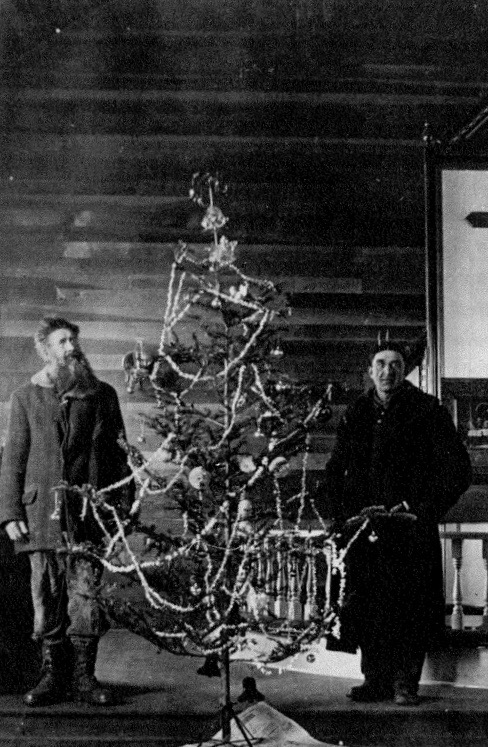
Church interior, Christmas 1920

The town was founded in 1916 on the route of the Great Northern Railway, and Appam well water was considered exceptionally good for steam engines. The meaning of the name "Appam," allegedly bestowed by a surveyor from Texas, is unknown.

Appam was settled largely by Scandinavian immigrants, and at its height the town had a population of perhaps one hundred, as well as businesses appropriate for its time and place, including a bank, a hotel, a garage, a blacksmith shop, two general stores, two hardware stores, and a post office. Most residents attended the town's Lutheran church.

The population was 113 in 1940.

Short story writer Carrie Adhele "Peggy" Berg Young (1923–2017) wrote several books of fiction and the memoir Nothing to Do but Stay (1991) about life in the Appam area between the coming of the homesteaders and the end of the Great Depression.

The frames and facades of some buildings survived into the 21st century, and a few people moved back into the area during the Bakken oil boom of the 2010s.

== See also ==
- List of ghost towns in North Dakota
