= A. R. Shaw =

American politician

A.R. "Archie" Shaw (February 4, 1922 – March 9, 2013) was an American educator and legislator.

Born in Hanks, North Dakota, Shaw served in the United States Navy during World War II. He then received his bachelor's degree from Minot State University and his master's degree from the University of North Dakota in addition to graduate study at the University of Minnesota. He was the superintendent of the Mandan, North Dakota Public Schools. He served as Mayor of Mandan, North Dakota 1968–1972. He then served in 1985 in the North Dakota House of Representatives as a Republican. He died in Mandan, North Dakota.
