= Williams County School District 8 =

School district in North Dakota, United States

Williams County School District #8, previously New Public School District #8 or New Public Schools, was a school district headquartered in Williston, North Dakota.

The district mainly served unincorporated areas that were rural territories near Williston. Additionally the district included a portion of Williston itself and all of Blacktail and Long Creek. It was the geographically largest school district in North Dakota.

The district only served grades K-8. High school students were sent to Williston High School in the Williston Public School District 1, to the Nesson School District's Ray School in Ray, and to the Tioga School District's Tioga High School in Tioga.

== History ==
It was established in the early 1950s, as a merger of various smaller school districts.

By 2016 the district held two bond elections that were defeated by voters. That year the district leadership decided to use the building fund to pay for a 22,400-square-foot (2,080 m^{2}) facility, with a cost of $16.9 million, meant to take the place of Stony Creek Middle School.

The name changed to its final name, Williams County 8, in 2017.

In 2020 a vote was held on whether it was to merge with the Williston District 1 to form a new district. 59.6% of the District 8 voters approved, as did 86.6% of the District 1 voters. The no percentages were 40.4% for District 8 and 13.4% for District 1. Some land that was in District 8 was given to other school districts.

In 2021 the Williams County district merged with the Williston District to form the Williston Basin School District 7.

== Area ==
The east-west dimension of the district was 70 miles (110 km), with the North Dakota-Montana border as the westward edge.

== Schools ==
None of the schools were in the Williston city limits even though the district administration was in Williston.

- Garden Valley Elementary School (K-5) - It is 9 miles (14 km) east of Williston. In 1997 it had 60 students.
- Round Prairie Elementary School (K-5) - It is 15 miles (24 km) west of Williston. In 1997 it had 34 students.
- Missouri Ridge (6-8)

Previously all schools were K-8 schools.

Previously it operated Harney School, a K-8 one room school, located in a mobile home. Named after board member Tom Harney, the facility was on a gravel road off of North Dakota Road 1804, 13 miles (21 km) east of Williston, and south of Tioga. It opened circa 1984 as the area population increased due to the discovery of oil. It historically had the lowest student enrollment of any of the schools. 12 was the peak enrollment. In 1997 the school had three students, making it the smallest of any North Dakota school. That year it had three computers in the back of the classroom along with a fax machine, a microwave, and a refrigerator. In the 2002-2003 school year, the number of students was six. For the 2003-2004 school year there was only one student enrolled, and the school closed after that year. At the end of its life the school had a fax machine and was wired to connect to the internet. Its second classroom, in the school's final year, functioned as an ad hoc dormitory for the sole teacher. Scheduling was flexible to accommodate the single student and break up monotony. The school board intended to not provide hot lunches nor school bus services for the lone student. The student's father took him to and from school. The superintendent allowed the student to do archery practice as he was the only student. Stony Creek was to take the former student after the closure of Harney.

The district also formerly operated Stony Creek School, immediately east of Williston. In 1997 it had 152 students. In 2016 it was a middle school only. By 2021 the school was in disuse and the district was determining how to give the school back to the property owner.
