= Battleview, North Dakota =

Township in Burke Town, North Dakota

Battleview
- Township
- Location within North Dakota Location within the United States
- Coordinates: 48°34′44″N 102°47′33″W
- Country: United States
- State: North Dakota
- County: Burke County

Area
  - Total: 35.79 sq mi (92.7 km^{2})
  - Land: 35.48 sq mi (91.9 km^{2})
  - Water: 0.31 sq mi (0.80 km^{2})
- Elevation: 2,202 ft (671 m)

Population (2010)
  - Total: 79
- GNIS feature ID: 1027834

Battleview is a township and settlement in Burke County, North Dakota, United States. The population was 79 as of the 2010 census, and 86 as of the 2000 census. The total area of the township is 35.79 square miles, of which 35.48 square miles, or 99.4%, is land and 0.31 square miles, or 0.6%, is water.

== Location ==
The Township of Battleview is located in the southwestern corner of Burke County and is southwest of the county seat of Bowbells, in central east Burke County. The township borders, to the north, Thorson Township, Burke County; to the south, Bicker Township, Mountrail County; to the east, Colville Township, Burke County; and to the west, Sauk Valley Township, Williams County. North Dakota State Highway 50 passes through the township from east to west, and North Dakota State Highway 40 passes through it from north to south. The settlement of Battleview is about 6 miles west of Powers Lake, North Dakota.
