= Hanks, North Dakota =

Hanks
- Unincorporated community
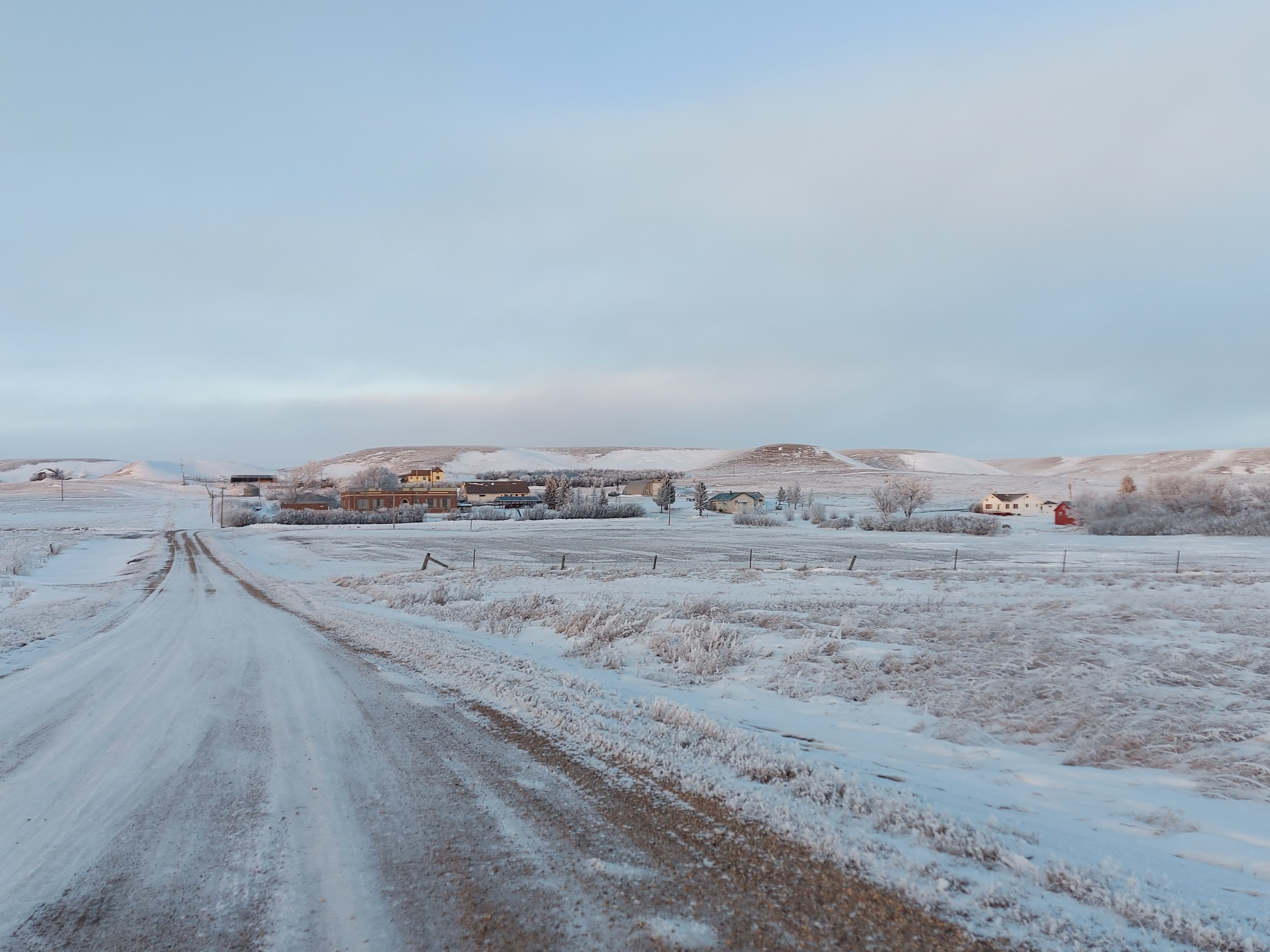
- Hanks, North Dakota

- Location within the state of North Dakota Hanks (the United States)
- Coordinates: 48°36′12″N 103°48′11″W
- Country: United States
- State: North Dakota
- County: Williams
- Elevation: 2,116 ft (645 m)
- Time zone: UTC-6 (Central (CST))
  - Summer (DST): UTC-5 (CDT)
- Area code: 701
- GNIS feature ID: 1029297

Hanks is an unincorporated community in Williams County, North Dakota, United States.

== Geography ==
Hanks is located on North Dakota Highway 50, and has the latitude of 48.603° N, and the longitude of −103.802° W. The elevation is 2,116 feet (645 m), and is located in the Central Time Zone.

== History ==
Hanks was founded in 1916 along a Great Northern Railway branch line that ran from Stanley to Grenora. The name honors W.F. Hanks, a banker from Powers Lake.

Hanks disincorporated in 1992.

According to a 2008 report, Hanks had only one inhabitant. The town was included in the National Geographic article The Emptied Prairie, published in January 2008.

Historical population
Census	Pop.	Note	%±
1930	213		—
1940	192		−9.9%
1950	115		−40.1%
1960	78		−32.2%
1970	13		−83.3%
1980	10		−23.1%
1990	11		10.0%
U.S. Decennial Census

== Notable people ==
- A. R. Shaw, educator and legislator
