= Williams County, North Dakota =

County in North Dakota, United States

- County
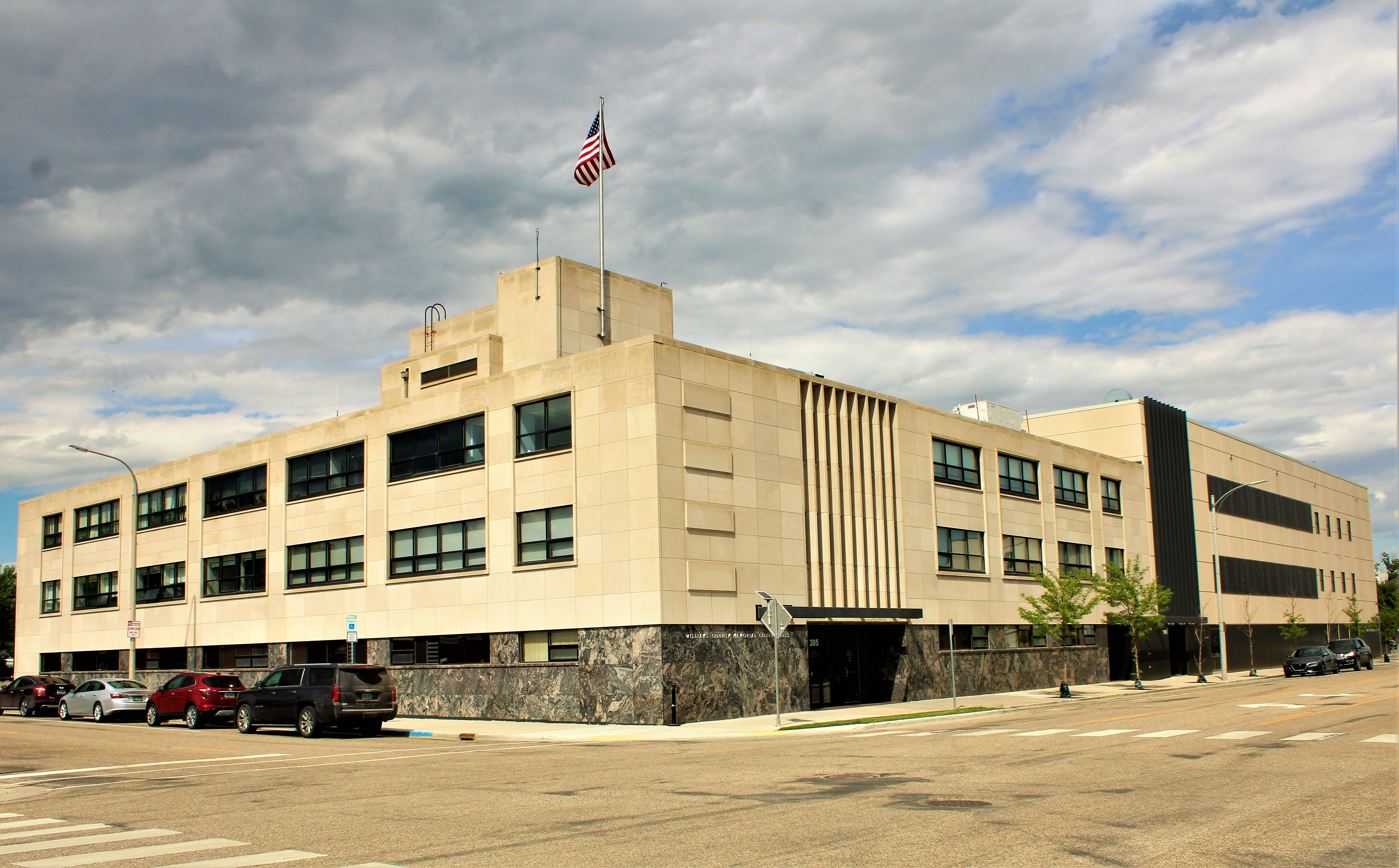
- The Williams County Courthouse in Williston

- Logo

- Location within the U.S. state of North Dakota
- Coordinates: 48.3558°N 103.5013°W
- Country: United States
- State: North Dakota
- Founded: March 2, 1891 (created); December 8, 1891 (organized)
- Named for: Erastus Appleman Williams
- Seat: Williston
- Largest city: Williston

Area
  - Total: 2,147.808 sq mi (5,562.80 km^{2})
  - Land: 2,077.600 sq mi (5,380.96 km^{2})
  - Water: 70.208 sq mi (181.84 km^{2}) 3.27%

Population (2020)
  - Total: 40,950
  - Estimate (2025): 41,767 ▲
  - Density: 19.71/sq mi (7.610/km^{2})
- Time zone: UTC−6 (Central)
  - Summer (DST): UTC−5 (CDT)
- Area code: 701
- Congressional district: At-large
- Website: williamsnd.com

Williams County is located on the western border of the U.S. state of North Dakota, next to Montana. As of the 2020 census, the population was 40,950, and was estimated to be 41,767 in 2025, making it the fifth-most populous county in North Dakota. The county seat and the largest city is Williston.

The Williston Micropolitan Statistical Area includes all of Williams County. It is bordered on the south by the upper Missouri River, whose confluence with its tributary Yellowstone River is located just east of the border with Montana.

== History ==
There have been two Williams counties in the history of North Dakota. The first, created in 1873, was located south of the Missouri River near where Dunn and Mercer counties are today. This county continued to exist through North Dakota statehood, and while the second Williams County was created in 1891. The first Williams County was extinguished by a county referendum on November 8, 1892; part of its territory was absorbed by Mercer County and the rest reverted to an unorganized territory.

The second Williams County was created by the North Dakota legislature on March 2, 1891, from the previous counties of Buford and Flannery, which were dissolved. The government of this county was organized on December 8, 1891. This county's boundaries were altered in 1910, when a portion of its territory was annexed to create Divide County. Its boundaries have remained unchanged since then. The county is named for Erastus Appleman Williams, a European-American settler who served in the Dakota Territory legislature and the North Dakota legislature.

In June 2014, lightning struck a Williams County Oasis Petroleum saltwater disposal facility. It sparked a fire that destroyed the facility, burning 630 gallons of oil and tens of thousands of gallons of brine.

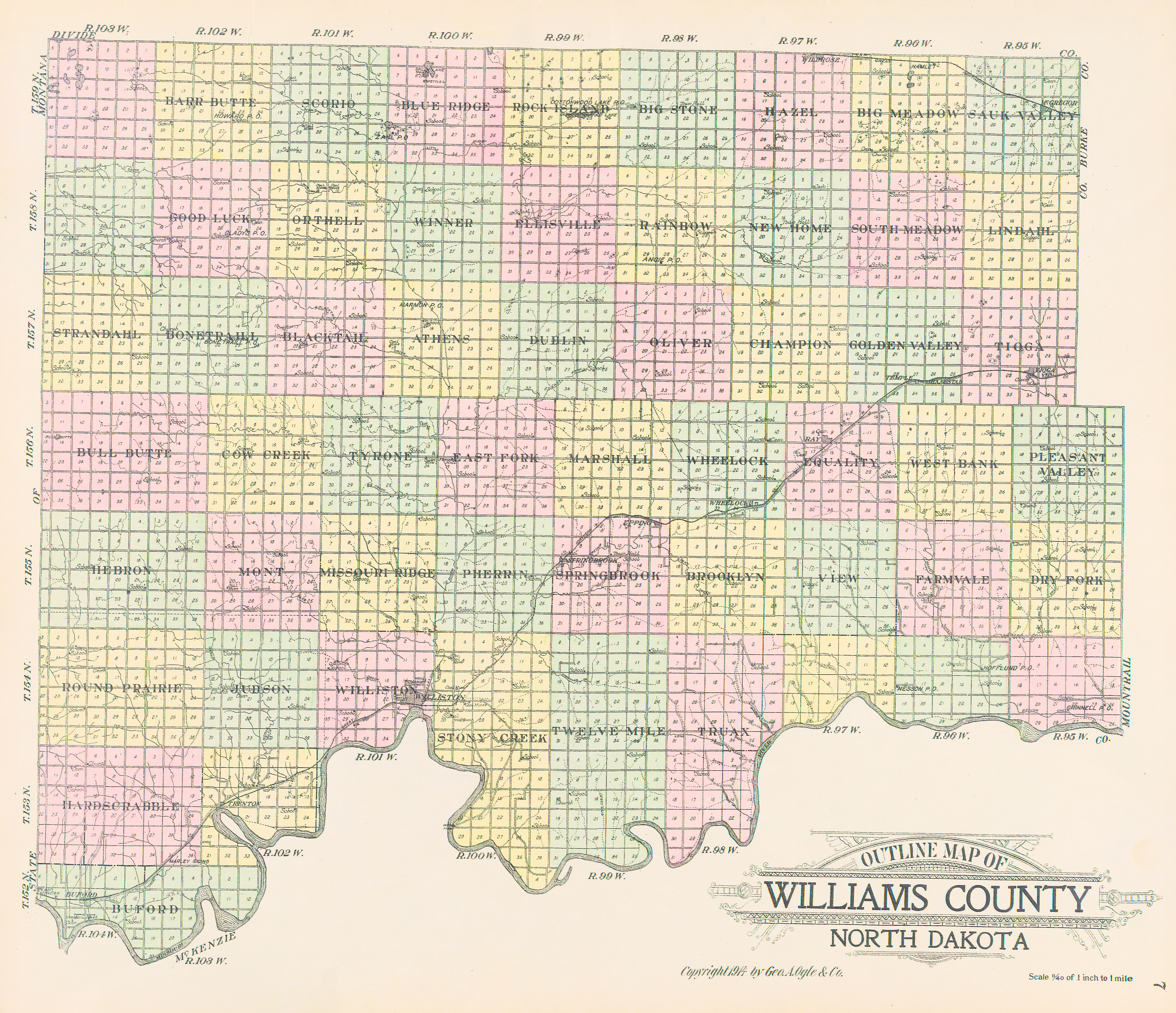
Outline map of Williams County, North Dakota, 1914

== Geography ==
Williams County lies on the west edge of North Dakota. Its west boundary line abuts the east boundary line of the state of Montana. The Missouri River flows eastward along the county's south boundary line from the confluence with its tributary Yellowstone River, located on the Dakota side of the state border with Montana. Horse Creek and Willow Creek flow to the west across the upper portion of the county. The terrain consists of isolated hills amid rolling, hilly, semi-arid stretches. The area is partly devoted to agriculture. The terrain is highest across its midpoint, and slopes to the NW and SE. Its highest point is a hill near the NE corner, at 2,470 ft (750 m) ASL.

According to the United States Census Bureau, the county has a total area of 2,147.808 square miles (5,562.80 km^{2}), of which 2,077.600 square miles (5,380.96 km^{2}) is land and 70.208 square miles (181.84 km^{2}) (3.27%) is water. It is the fourth-largest county in North Dakota by total area.

Lake Sakakawea, a reservoir on the Missouri River, is situated on the southern boundary of the county. Little Muddy Creek is entirely within Williams County. The confluence of the Yellowstone River with the Missouri is west of Williston.

The Fort Union Trading Post National Historic Site is located in Williams County along the Missouri River on the Montana border. Williams County is one of several western North Dakota counties with significant exposure to the Bakken formation in the Williston Basin.

=== Major highways ===
- US 2
- US 85
- US 85B
- ND 40
- ND 42
- ND 50
- ND 1804

=== Transit ===
- Amtrak Empire Builder (Williston station)
- Wildrose Public Transportation (WPT)

=== Adjacent counties ===
- Divide County (north)
- Burke County (northeast)
- Mountrail County (east)
- McKenzie County (south)
- Roosevelt County, Montana (southwest)
- Sheridan County, Montana (west)

=== Protected areas ===
- Fort Union Trading Post National Historic Site (part)
- Hofflund State Game Management Area
- Lewis & Clark State Park
- Lake Zahl National Wildlife Refuge
- North Tobacco Garden State Game Management Area

=== Lakes ===
- Alkali Lake
- Blacktail Lake
- Cottonwood Lake
- Epping Dam
- Green Lake
- Helle Slough
- Holm Lake
- Kota-Ray Dam
- Lake Trenton
- Lake Zahl
- McLeod Lake
- Shirley Lake
- Tioga River Dam
- Twin Lakes

== Demographics ==
Historical population
Census	Pop.	Note	%±
1880	14		—
1890	109		678.6%
1900	1,530		1,303.7%
1910	14,234		830.3%
1920	17,980		26.3%
1930	19,553		8.7%
1940	16,315		−16.6%
1950	16,442		0.8%
1960	22,051		34.1%
1970	19,301		−12.5%
1980	22,237		15.2%
1990	21,129		−5.0%
2000	19,761		−6.5%
2010	22,398		13.3%
2020	40,950		82.8%
2025 (est.)	41,767		2.0%
U.S. Decennial Census; 1790–1960 1900–1990; 1990–2000 2010–2020

As of the third quarter of 2025, the median home value in Williams County was $313,201.

As of the 2024 American Community Survey, there are 15,154 estimated households in Williams County with an average of 2.57 persons per household. The county has a median household income of $85,595. Approximately 8.6% of the county's population lives at or below the poverty line. Williams County has an estimated 70.0% employment rate, with 24.4% of the population holding a bachelor's degree or higher and 93.1% holding a high school diploma. There were 20,376 housing units at an average density of 9.81 per square mile (3.8/km^{2}).

The top five reported languages (people were allowed to report up to two languages, thus the figures will generally add to more than 100%) were English (88.5%), Spanish (7.1%), Indo-European (2.0%), Asian and Pacific Islander (1.1%), and Other (1.4%).

The median age in the county was 31.8 years.

Williams County, North Dakota – racial and ethnic composition Note: the US Census treats Hispanic/Latino as an ethnic category. This table excludes Latinos from the racial categories and assigns them to a separate category. Hispanics/Latinos may be of any race.
Race / ethnicity (NH = non-Hispanic)	Pop. 1980	Pop. 1990	Pop. 2000	Pop. 2010	Pop. 2020	Pop. 2024
White alone (NH)	21,366 (96.08%)	19,953 (94.43%)	18,245 (92.33%)	20,364 (90.92%)	30,761 (75.12%)	30,333 (74.41%)
Black or African American alone (NH)	3 (0.01%)	18 (0.09%)	18 (0.09%)	57 (0.25%)	2,041 (4.98%)	2,097 (5.14%)
Native American or Alaska Native alone (NH)	715 (3.22%)	1,004 (4.75%)	865 (4.38%)	878 (3.92%)	1,125 (2.75%)	1,514 (3.71%)
Asian alone (NH)	61 (0.27%)	42 (0.20%)	36 (0.18%)	78 (0.35%)	612 (1.49%)	574 (1.41%)
Pacific Islander alone (NH)	—	—	2 (0.01%)	5 (0.02%)	98 (0.24%)	92 (0.23%)
Other race alone (NH)	21 (0.09%)	2 (0.01%)	4 (0.02%)	3 (0.01%)	164 (0.40%)	—
Mixed race or multiracial (NH)	—	—	406 (2.05%)	577 (2.58%)	2,252 (5.50%)	1,447 (3.55%)
Hispanic or Latino (any race)	71 (0.32%)	110 (0.52%)	185 (0.94%)	436 (1.95%)	3,897 (9.52%)	4,706 (11.54%)
Total	22,237 (100.00%)	21,129 (100.00%)	19,761 (100.00%)	22,398 (100.00%)	40,950 (100.00%)	40,763 (100.00%)

=== 2024 estimate ===
As of the 2024 estimate, there were 40,763 people, 15,154 households, and _ families residing in the county. The population density was 19.62 inhabitants per square mile (7.6/km^{2}). There were 20,376 housing units at an average density of 9.81 per square mile (3.8/km^{2}). The racial makeup of the county was 83.96% White, 5.58% African American, 4.55% Native American, 1.52% Asian, 0.31% Pacific Islander, _% from some other races and 4.09% from two or more races. Hispanic or Latino people of any race were 11.54% of the population.

=== 2020 census ===
As of the 2020 census, there were 40,950 people, 16,095 households, and 9,585 families residing in the county. The population density was 19.71 inhabitants per square mile (7.6/km^{2}). There were 20,227 housing units at an average density of 9.74 per square mile (3.8/km^{2}). The racial makeup of the county was 77.79% White, 5.12% African American, 2.93% Native American, 1.55% Asian, 0.25% Pacific Islander, 3.73% from some other races and 8.64% from two or more races. Hispanic or Latino people of any race were 9.52% of the population.

There were 16,095 households, 33.8% had children under the age of 18 living with them and 17.4% had a female householder with no spouse or partner present. About 30.4% of all households were made up of individuals and 6.6% had someone living alone who was 65 years of age or older.

Of the residents, 27.2% were under the age of 18 and 8.8% were 65 years of age or older; the median age was 31.6 years. For every 100 females there were 117.3 males, and for every 100 females age 18 and over there were 123.2 males. Among occupied housing units, 47.6% were owner-occupied and 52.4% were renter-occupied, with a homeowner vacancy rate of 2.7% and a rental vacancy rate of 21.3%.

=== 2010 census ===
As of the 2010 census, there were 22,398 people, 9,293 households, and 5,746 families in the county. The population density was 10.78 inhabitants per square mile (4.2/km^{2}). There were 10,464 housing units at an average density of 5.04 per square mile (1.9/km^{2}). The racial makeup of the county was 92.15% White, 0.28% African American, 4.01% Native American, 0.35% Asian, 0.02% Pacific Islander, 0.31% from some other races and 2.88% from two or more races. Hispanic or Latino people of any race were 1.95% of the population.

In terms of ancestry, 46.2% were of Norwegian, 35.9% of German, 9.8% of Irish, 4.5% of Swedish and 4.4% of English ancestry.

There were 9,293 households, 28.5% had children under the age of 18 living with them, 49.8% were married couples living together, 7.7% had a female householder with no husband present, 38.2% were non-families, and 31.5% of all households were made up of individuals. The average household size was 2.35 and the average family size was 2.95. The median age was 39.0 years.

The median income for a household in the county was $55,396 and the median income for a family was $67,875. Males had a median income of $50,735 versus $27,071 for females. The per capita income for the county was $29,153. About 4.7% of families and 8.7% of the population were below the poverty line, including 9.7% of those under age 18 and 10.4% of those age 65 or over.

== Media ==
- The Williston Herald

== Communities ==
=== Cities ===
- Alamo
- Epping
- Grenora
- Ray
- Springbrook
- Tioga
- Wildrose
- Williston (county seat)

=== Census-designated places ===
- Blacktail
- Long Creek
- McGregor
- Trenton

=== Other unincorporated communities ===
- Appam
- Bonetraill
- Buford
- Corinth
- Hamlet
- Hanks
- Lunds Landing
- Temple
- Wheelock
- Zahl

=== Townships ===
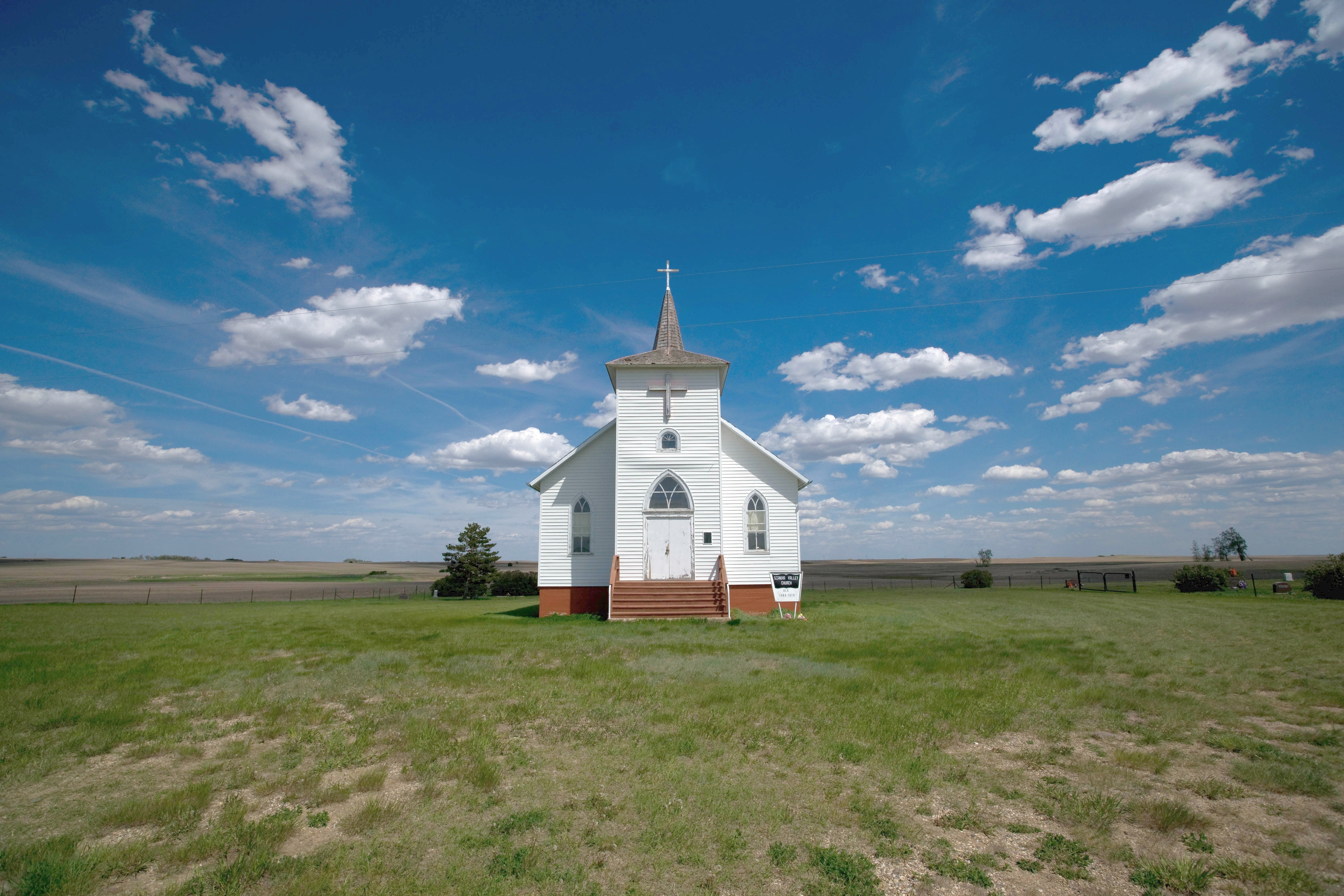
Scandia Valley Lutheran Church in Bonetraill Township, North Dakota

- Athens
- Barr Butte
- Big Meadow
- Big Stone
- Blacktail
- Blue Ridge
- Bonetraill
- Brooklyn
- Buford
- Bull Butte
- Champion
- Climax
- Cow Creek
- Dry Fork
- Dublin
- East Fork
- Ellisville
- Equality
- Farmvale
- Golden Valley
- Good Luck
- Grenora
- Hardscrabble
- Hazel
- Hebron
- Judson
- Lindahl
- Marshall
- Missouri Ridge
- Mont
- New Home
- Oliver
- Orthell
- Pherrin
- Pleasant Valley
- Rainbow
- Rock Island
- Round Prairie
- Sauk Valley
- Scorio
- South Meadow
- Springbrook
- Stony Creek
- Strandahl
- Tioga
- Trenton
- Truax
- Twelve Mile
- Tyrone
- View
- West Bank
- Wheelock
- Williston
- Winner

=== Defunct townships ===
- Hofflund

== Politics ==
Williams County voters have been reliably Republican for decades. In no national election since 1964 has the county selected the Democratic Party candidate.

United States presidential election results for Williams County, North Dakota
Year	Republican		Democratic		Third party(ies)	
Year	No.	%	No.	%	No.	%
1900	249	71.97%	95	27.46%	2	0.58%
1904	825	70.94%	316	27.17%	22	1.89%
1908	1,979	60.41%	1,034	31.56%	263	8.03%
1912	549	24.08%	696	30.53%	1,035	45.39%
1916	903	28.28%	1,769	55.40%	521	16.32%
1920	3,768	65.31%	1,330	23.05%	671	11.63%
1924	1,865	36.76%	308	6.07%	2,900	57.17%
1928	3,591	57.25%	2,503	39.91%	178	2.84%
1932	1,509	21.92%	4,823	70.06%	552	8.02%
1936	1,021	13.66%	4,903	65.61%	1,549	20.73%
1940	2,470	34.25%	4,579	63.50%	162	2.25%
1944	2,217	36.57%	3,748	61.82%	98	1.62%
1948	2,133	38.82%	2,571	46.79%	791	14.39%
1952	4,307	58.46%	2,999	40.71%	61	0.83%
1956	4,188	50.07%	4,157	49.70%	19	0.23%
1960	4,492	48.95%	4,683	51.03%	2	0.02%
1964	3,076	36.45%	5,352	63.42%	11	0.13%
1968	3,980	51.51%	3,263	42.23%	483	6.25%
1972	4,800	59.90%	2,989	37.30%	225	2.81%
1976	4,230	48.67%	4,189	48.19%	273	3.14%
1980	6,530	65.93%	2,545	25.70%	829	8.37%
1984	8,166	70.87%	3,177	27.57%	180	1.56%
1988	5,653	57.87%	4,004	40.99%	111	1.14%
1992	3,664	36.95%	3,008	30.33%	3,245	32.72%
1996	3,590	45.79%	3,018	38.49%	1,232	15.71%
2000	5,187	66.44%	2,330	29.85%	290	3.71%
2004	6,278	70.31%	2,512	28.13%	139	1.56%
2008	6,291	67.12%	2,921	31.16%	161	1.72%
2012	7,184	73.25%	2,322	23.67%	302	3.08%
2016	10,069	78.62%	1,735	13.55%	1,003	7.83%
2020	11,739	81.90%	2,169	15.13%	426	2.97%
2024	12,501	82.67%	2,276	15.05%	345	2.28%

== Education ==
School districts include:

- Divide County Public School, District 1, Crosby
- Eightmile Public School, District 6, Trenton
- Grenora Public School, District 99, Grenora
- Nesson Public School, District 2, Ray
- Tioga Public School, District 15, Tioga
- Williston Basin School, District 7, Williston

This map was made before Williston Public School District 1 and Williams County Public School District 8 merged into Williston Basin School District 7 in 2021.

Former districts include:

- Williams County Public School, District 8, Williston (formerly New Public School District 8, elementary only) - Merged into Williston Basin 7 in 2021.
- Williston Public School, District 1, Williston - Merged into Williston Basin 7 in 2021.

St. Joseph's Catholic School and Williston Trinity Christian School are two private schools in the county.

== See also ==
- National Register of Historic Places listings in Williams County, North Dakota
- North Dakota statistical areas
