= Alamo, North Dakota =

- City
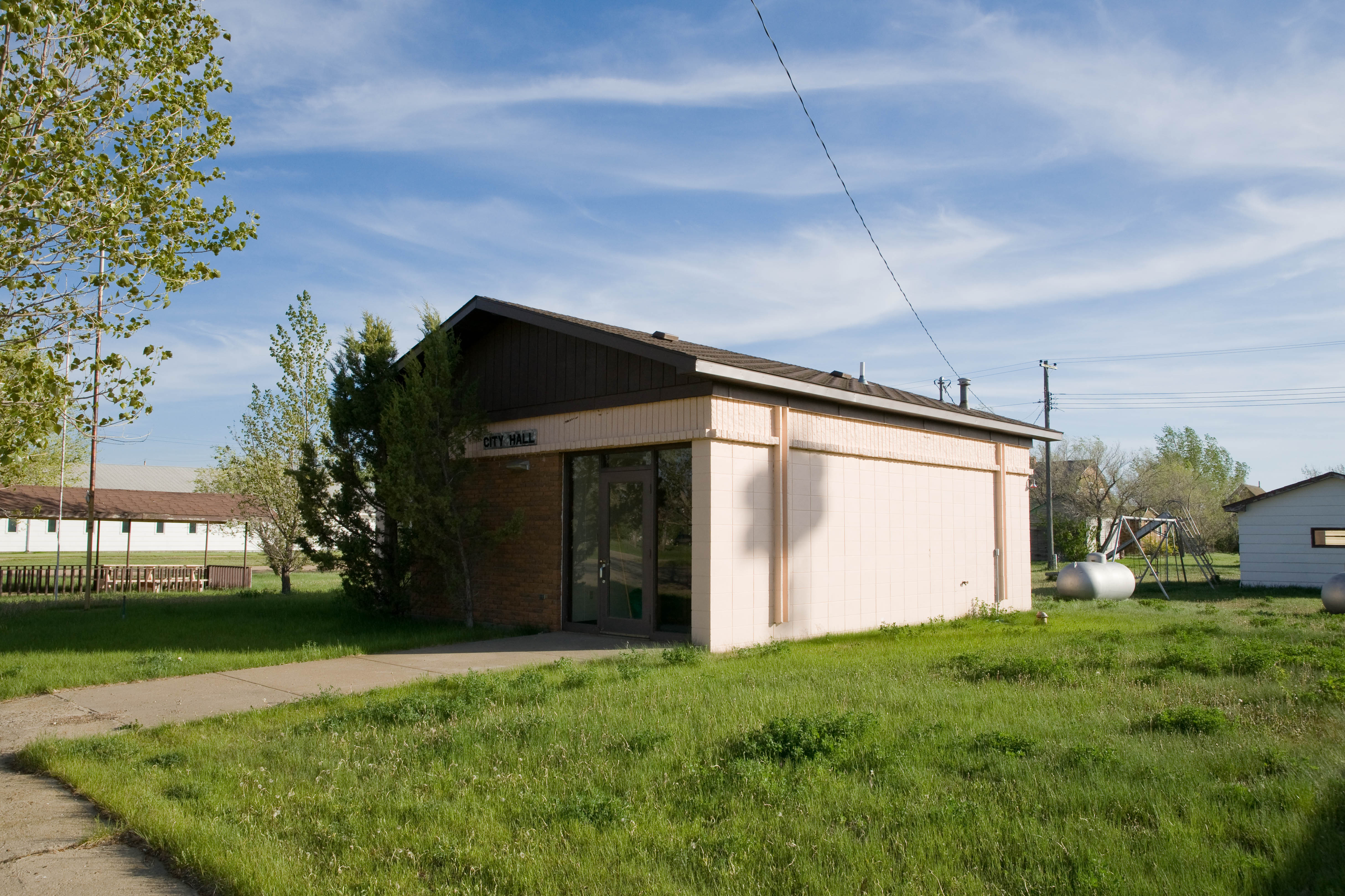
- City Hall
- Interactive map of Alamo, North Dakota
- Location within North Dakota
- Coordinates: 48.5820°N 103.4674°W
- Country: United States
- State: North Dakota
- County: Williams
- Founded: 1916

Area
  - Total: 0.572 sq mi (1.481 km^{2})
  - Land: 0.548 sq mi (1.420 km^{2})
  - Water: 0.024 sq mi (0.061 km^{2}) 4.20%
- Elevation: 2,130 ft (650 m)

Population (2020)
  - Total: 53
  - Estimate (2025): 56
  - Density: 97/sq mi (37/km^{2})
- Time zone: UTC–6 (Central (CST))
  - Summer (DST): UTC–5 (CDT)
- ZIP Code: 58830
- Area code: 701
- FIPS code: 38-00940
- GNIS feature ID: 1035902

Alamo is a city in Williams County, North Dakota, United States. The population was 53 as of the 2020 census, and was estimated at 56 in 2025.

== History ==
Alamo was founded in 1916.

== Geography ==
According to the United States Census Bureau, the city has a total area of 0.572 square miles (1.48 km^{2}), of which 0.548 square miles (1.42 km^{2}) is land and 0.024 square miles (0.06 km^{2}) (4.20%) is water.

== Demographics ==
Historical population
| Census | Pop. | Note | %± |
|---|---|---|---|
| 1930 | 211 | | — |
| 1940 | 214 | | 1.4% |
| 1950 | 192 | | −10.3% |
| 1960 | 182 | | −5.2% |
| 1970 | 124 | | −31.9% |
| 1980 | 122 | | −1.6% |
| 1990 | 69 | | −43.4% |
| 2000 | 51 | | −26.1% |
| 2010 | 57 | | 11.8% |
| 2020 | 53 | | −7.0% |
| 2025 (est.) | 56 | | 5.7% |
U.S. Decennial Census; 2020 Census

=== 2020 census ===
As of the 2020 census, there were 53 people, 20 households, and 16 families residing in the city.

=== 2010 census ===
As of the 2010 census, there were 57 people, 25 households, and 11 families residing in the city. The population density was 103.6 inhabitants per square mile (40.0/km^{2}). There were 41 housing units at an average density of 74.5 per square mile (28.8/km^{2}). The racial makeup of the city was 86.0% White, 12.3% from other races, and 1.8% from two or more races. Hispanic or Latino people of any race were 12.3% of the population.

There were 25 households, of which 24.0% had children under the age of 18 living with them, 32.0% were married couples living together, 4.0% had a female householder with no husband present, 8.0% had a male householder with no wife present, and 56.0% were non-families. 36.0% of all households were made up of individuals, and 16% had someone living alone who was 65 years of age or older. The average household size was 2.28 and the average family size was 3.18.

The median age in the city was 39.4 years. 24.6% of residents were under the age of 18; 1.8% were between the ages of 18 and 24; 30% were from 25 to 44; 24.6% were from 45 to 64; and 19.3% were 65 years of age or older. The gender makeup of the city was 56.1% male and 43.9% female.

=== 2000 census ===
As of the 2000 census, there were 51 people, 25 households, and 18 families residing in the city. The population density was 94.0 inhabitants per square mile (36.3/km^{2}). There were 43 housing units at an average density of 79.3 per square mile (30.6/km^{2}). The racial makeup of the city was 100.00% White.

There were 25 households, out of which 16.0% had children under the age of 18 living with them, 64.0% were married couples living together, 8.0% had a female householder with no husband present, and 28.0% were non-families. 28.0% of all households were made up of individuals, and 4.0% had someone living alone who was 65 years of age or older. The average household size was 2.04 and the average family size was 2.44.

In the city, the population was spread out, with 9.8% under the age of 18, 5.9% from 18 to 24, 13.7% from 25 to 44, 41.2% from 45 to 64, and 29.4% who were 65 years of age or older. The median age was 50 years. For every 100 females, there were 121.7 males. For every 100 females age 18 and over, there were 109.1 males.

The median income for a household in the city was $27,917, and the median income for a family was $29,792. Males had a median income of $30,000 versus $11,667 for females. The per capita income for the city was $17,138. There were 5.9% of families and 10.4% of the population living below the poverty line, including 100.0% of under eighteens and 14.3% of those over 64.

== Gallery ==
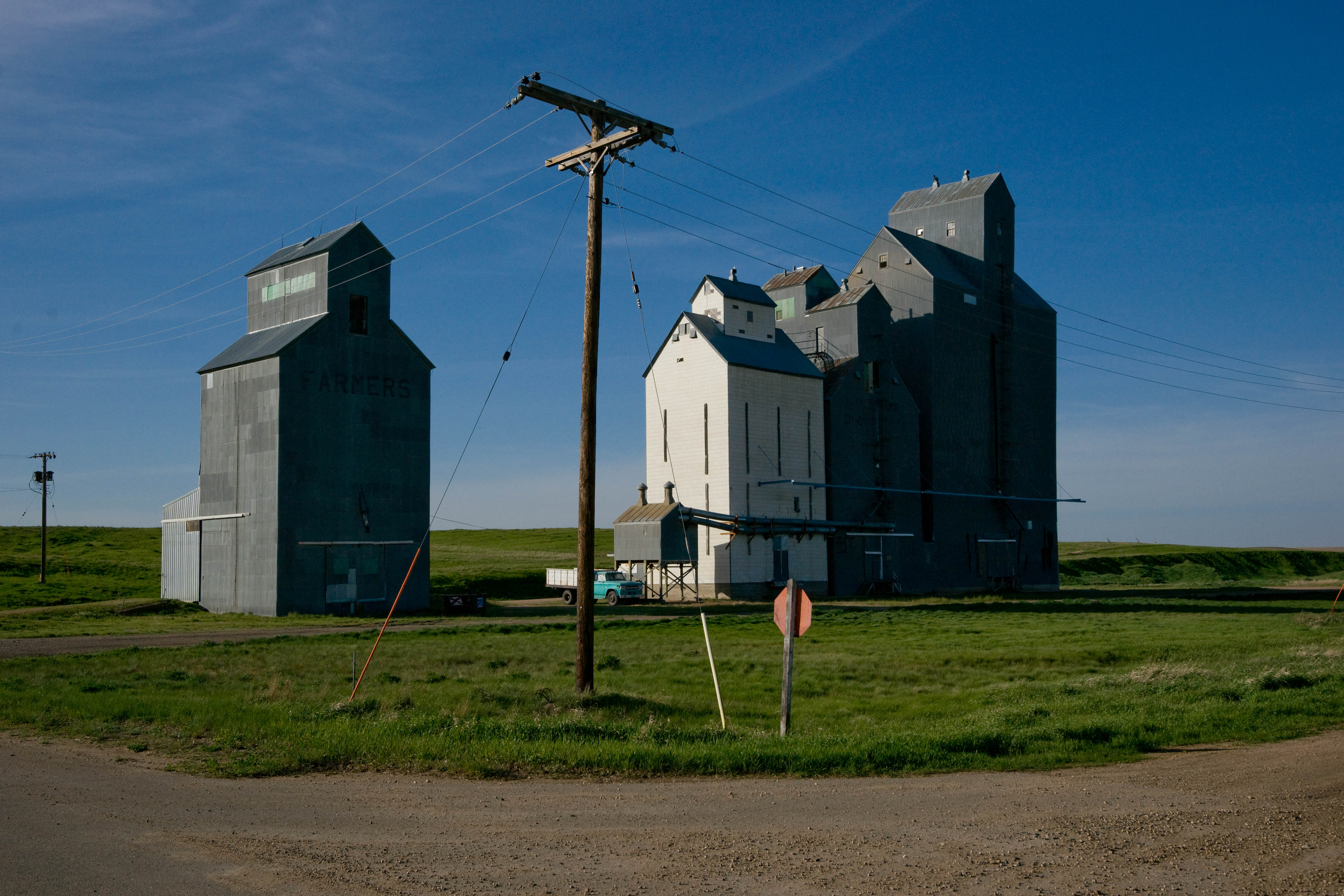
grain elevators in Alamo

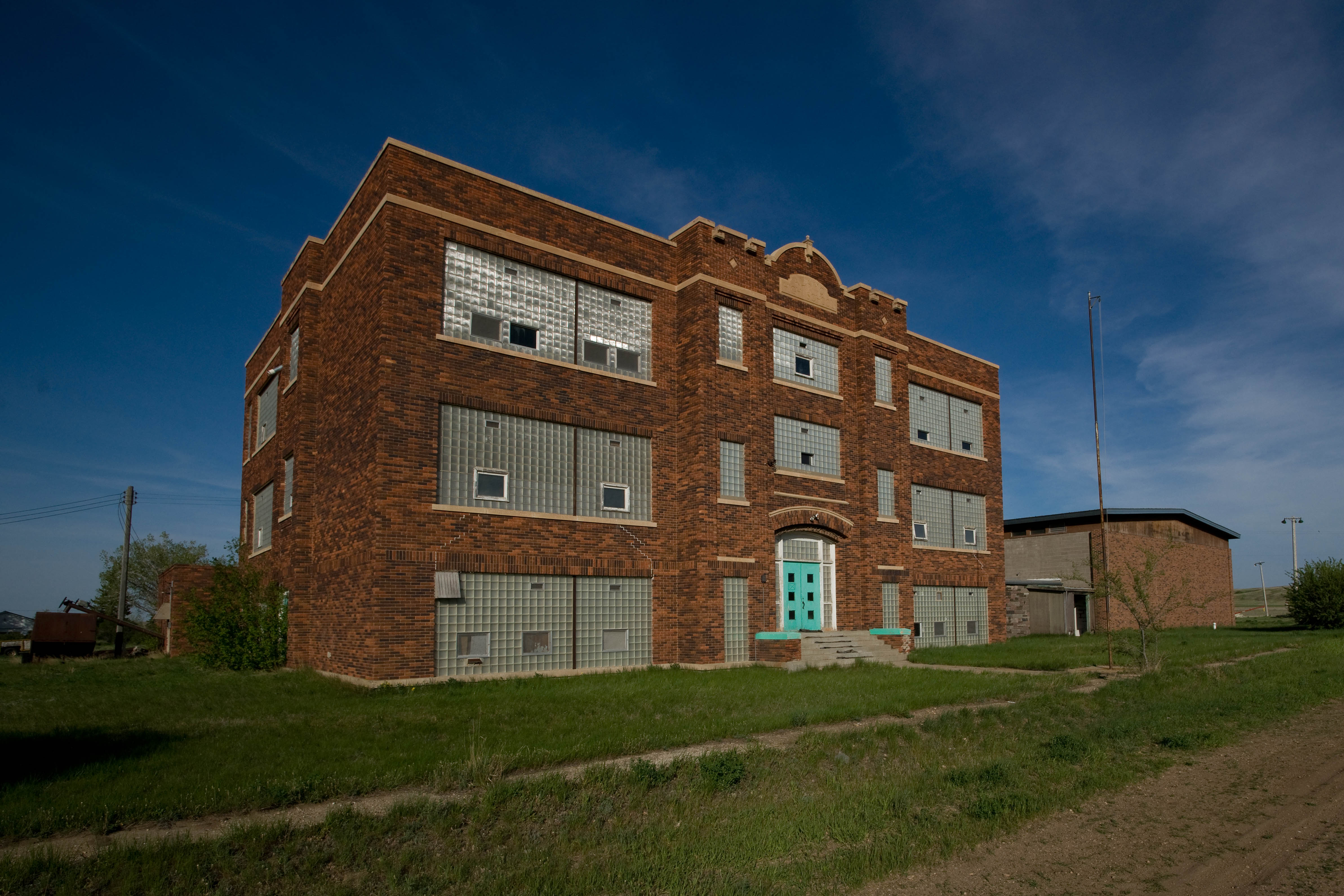
Alamo High School building

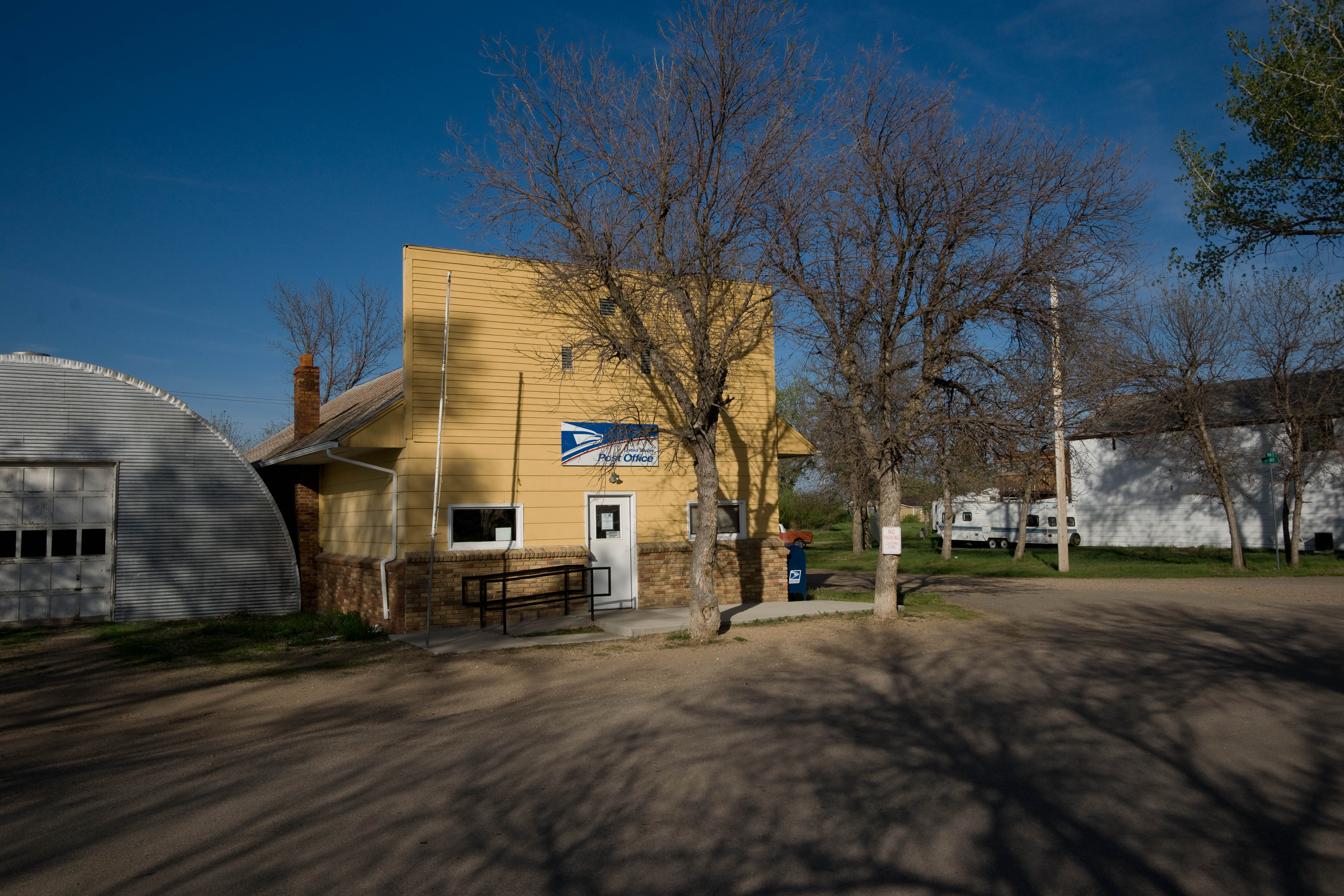
Post Office

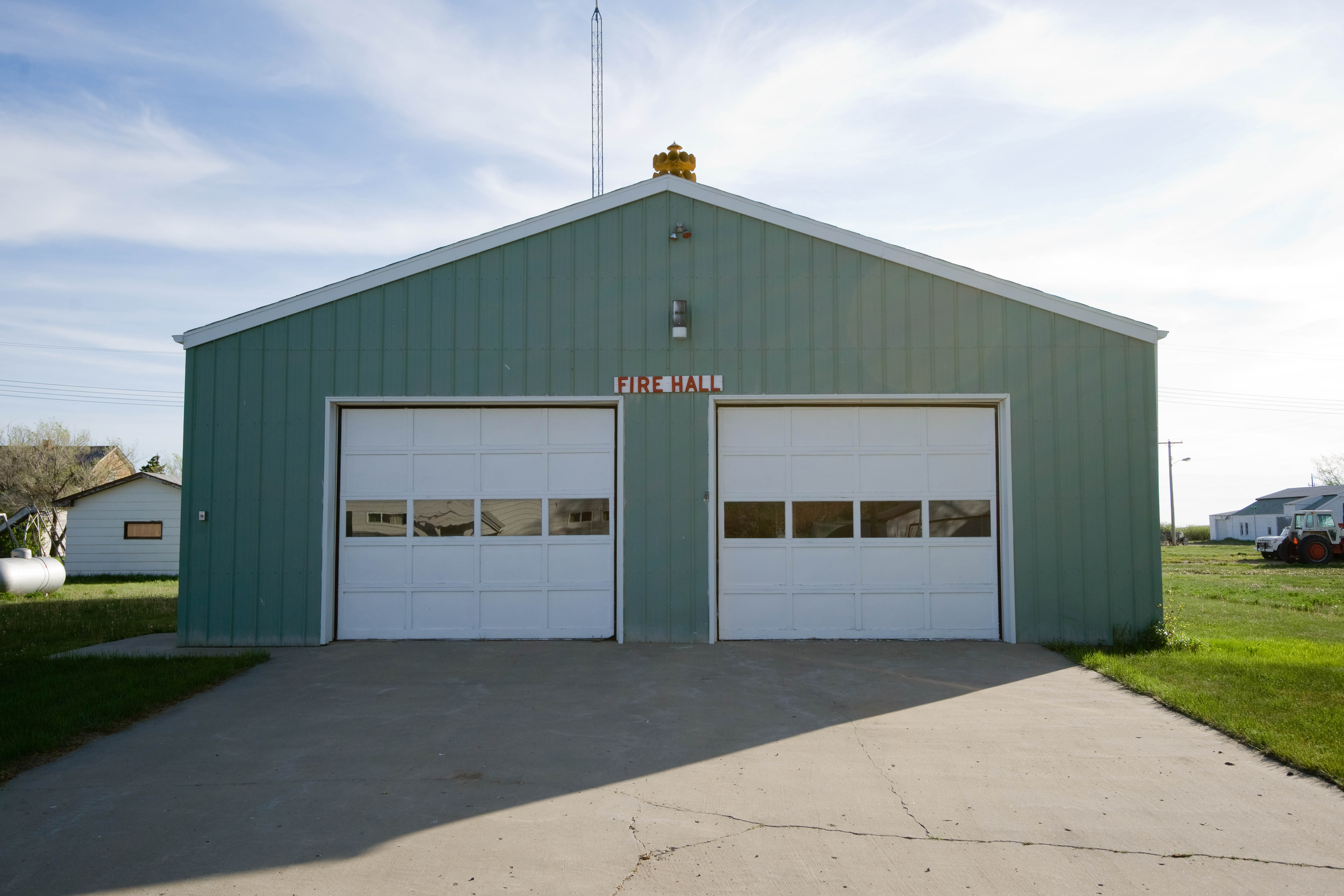
Fire station
