= North Dakota Highway 50 =

State highway in North Dakota, U.S.

North Dakota Highway 50

Route information
- Maintained by NDDOT
- Length: 100.245 mi (161.329 km)
- Existed: c. 1927–present

Major junctions
- West end: S-258 at the Montana border near Grenora
- US 85 west of Alamo; ND 8 east of Powers Lake
- East end: US 52 northwest of Donnybrook

Location
- Country: United States
- State: North Dakota
- Counties: Williams, Burke, Mountrail, Ward

Highway system
- North Dakota State Highway System; Interstate; US; State
← ND 49	→ US 52

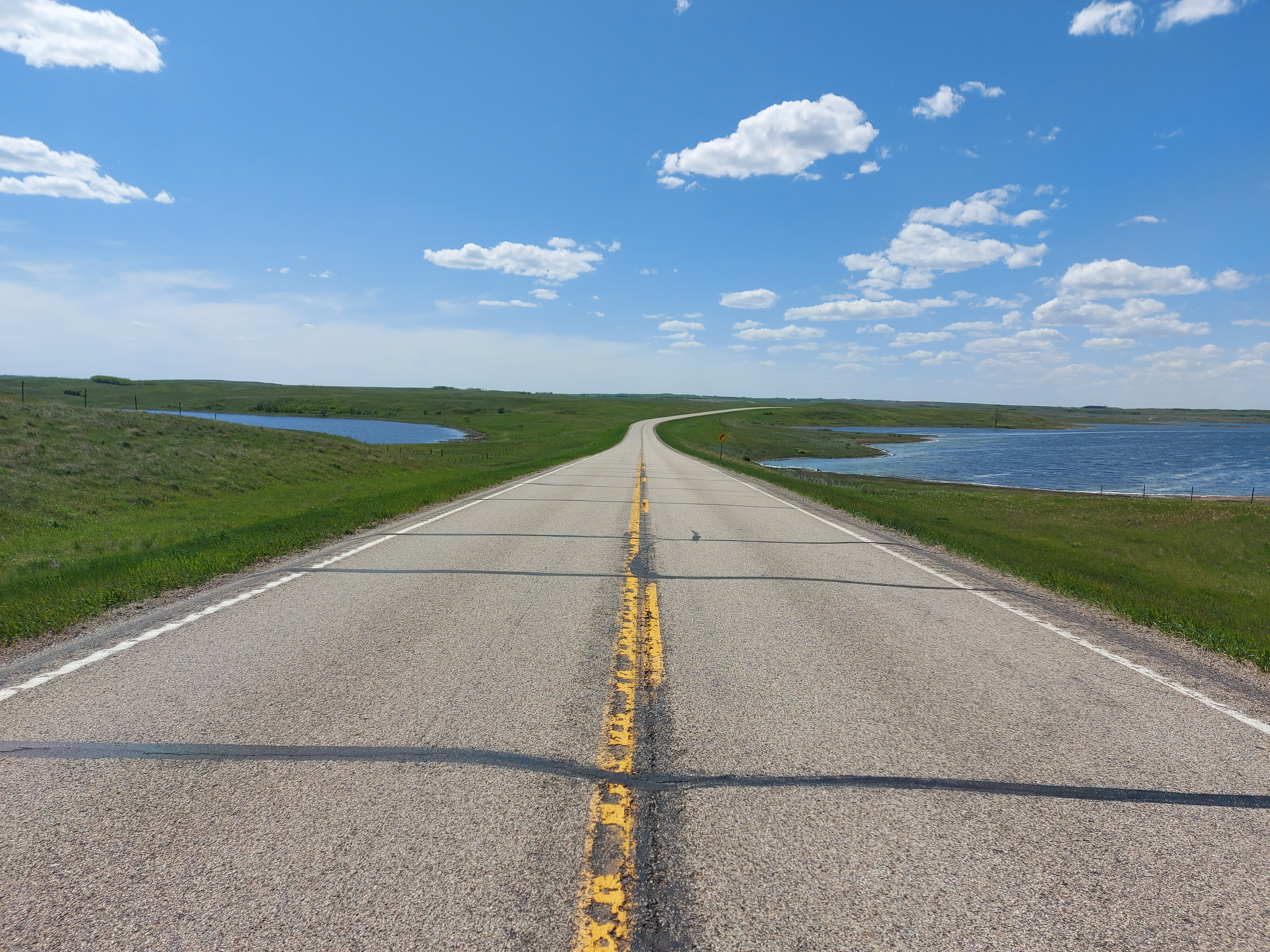
Highway 50 through the Lostwood National Wildlife Refuge with Lostwood Lake on the right.

North Dakota Highway 50 (ND 50) is a 100.245-mile-long (161.329 km) east–west state highway in the U.S. state of North Dakota. ND 50's western terminus is a continuation as Montana Highway 258 (MT 258) at the Montana border, and the eastern terminus is at U.S. Route 52 (US 52) northwest of Donnybrook.

== Major intersections ==
County	Location	mi	km	Destinations	Notes
Williams		0.000	0.000	S-258	Continuation into Montana
Williams		20.387	32.810	US 85 – Williston, Fortuna	
Williams		35.095	56.480	ND 42 north – Crosby	Southern terminus of ND 42
Williams		54.403	87.553	ND 40 south – Tioga	Western end of ND 40 concurrency
Burke		61.385	98.790	ND 40 north – Columbus	Eastern end of ND 40 concurrency
Burke		78.798	126.813	ND 8 north – Bowbells	Western end of ND 8 concurrency
Burke–Mountrail county line		79.612	128.123	ND 8 south – Stanley	Eastern end of ND 8 concurrency
Ward		100.245	161.329	US 52 – Donnybrook, Minot, Kenmare	Eastern terminus
1.000 mi = 1.609 km; 1.000 km = 0.621 mi: Concurrency terminus
