= Epping, North Dakota =

- City
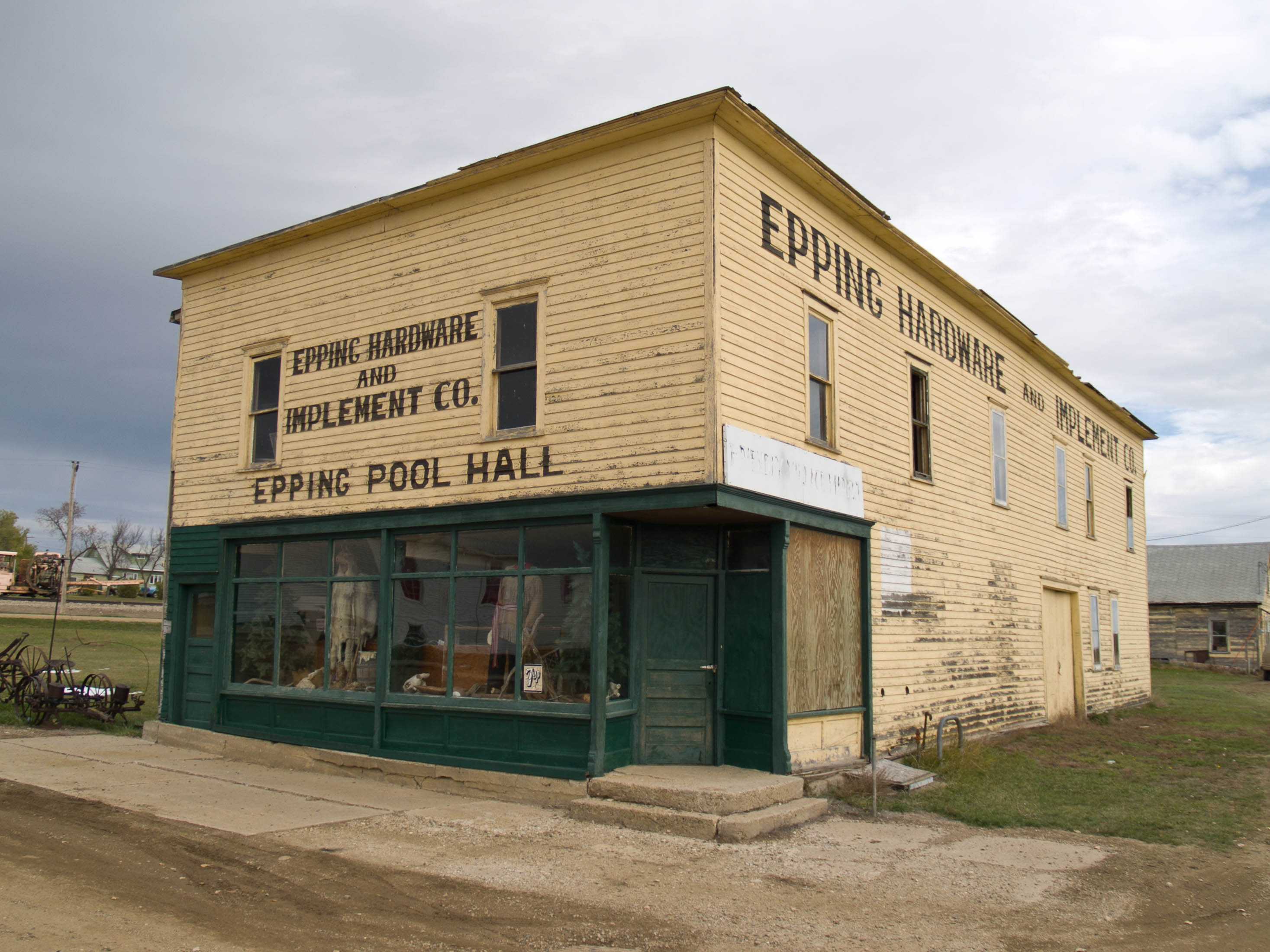
- Epping Hardware
- Motto: "The 'Biggest' Little On The Great Northern Railroad"
- Location of Epping, North Dakota

- Location within the United States
- Coordinates: 48°16′54″N 103°21′28″W
- Country: United States
- State: North Dakota
- County: Williams
- Founded: 1905

Government
  - Mayor: Trevor Bemis

Area
  - Total: 0.37 sq mi (0.97 km^{2})
  - Land: 0.37 sq mi (0.97 km^{2})
  - Water: 0 sq mi (0.00 km^{2})
- Elevation: 2,228 ft (679 m)

Population (2020)
  - Total: 84
  - Estimate (2022): 78
  - Density: 224.5/sq mi (86.68/km^{2})
- Time zone: UTC-6 (Central (CST))
  - Summer (DST): UTC-5 (CDT)
- ZIP code: 58843
- Area code: 701
- FIPS code: 38-24540
- GNIS feature ID: 1036025
- Website: epping.govoffice.com

Epping is a city in Williams County, North Dakota, United States. The population was 84 at the 2020 census.

Epping was founded in 1905 along the transcontinental rail line of the Great Northern Railway. The name comes from the city of Epping in England.

== Geography ==
According to the United States Census Bureau, the city has a total area of 0.38 square miles (0.98 km^{2}), all land.

== Demographics ==
Historical population
Census	Pop.	Note	%±
1920	116		—
1930	183		57.8%
1940	154		−15.8%
1950	158		2.6%
1960	151		−4.4%
1970	140		−7.3%
1980	104		−25.7%
1990	64		−38.5%
2000	79		23.4%
2010	100		26.6%
2020	84		−16.0%
2022 (est.)	78		−7.1%
U.S. Decennial Census; 2020 Census

=== 2010 census ===
As of the census of 2010, there were 100 people, 37 households, and 27 families residing in the city. The population density was 263.2 inhabitants per square mile (101.6/km^{2}). There were 40 housing units at an average density of 105.3 per square mile (40.7/km^{2}). The racial makeup of the city was 81.0% White, 11.0% Native American, 5.0% Asian, and 3.0% from two or more races.

There were 37 households, of which 37.8% had children under the age of 18 living with them, 67.6% were married couples living together, 2.7% had a female householder with no husband present, 2.7% had a male householder with no wife present, and 27.0% were non-families. 24.3% of all households were made up of individuals, and 5.4% had someone living alone who was 65 years of age or older. The average household size was 2.70 and the average family size was 3.26.

The median age in the city was 39.5 years. 31% of residents were under the age of 18; 4% were between the ages of 18 and 24; 20% were from 25 to 44; 33% were from 45 to 64; and 12% were 65 years of age or older. The gender makeup of the city was 49.0% male and 51.0% female.

=== 2000 census ===
As of the census of 2000, there were 79 people, 33 households, and 23 families residing in the city. The population density was 207.7 inhabitants per square mile (80.2/km^{2}). There were 41 housing units at an average density of 107.8 per square mile (41.6/km^{2}). The racial makeup of the city was 94.94% White and 5.06% Native American.

There were 33 households, out of which 30.3% had children under the age of 18 living with them, 63.6% were married couples living together, 3.0% had a female householder with no husband present, and 30.3% were non-families. 27.3% of all households were made up of individuals, and 12.1% had someone living alone who was 65 years of age or older. The average household size was 2.39 and the average family size was 2.96.

In the city, the population was spread out, with 22.8% under the age of 18, 6.3% from 18 to 24, 25.3% from 25 to 44, 34.2% from 45 to 64, and 11.4% who were 65 years of age or older. The median age was 43 years. For every 100 females, there were 102.6 males. For every 100 females age 18 and over, there were 103.3 males.

The median income for a household in the city was $29,167, and the median income for a family was $33,125. Males had a median income of $28,542 versus $23,125 for females. The per capita income for the city was $14,167. There were 19.0% of families and 22.7% of the population living below the poverty line, including 38.1% of under eighteens and none of those over 64.

== Transportation ==
Amtrak's Empire Builder, which operates between Seattle/Portland and Chicago, passes through the town on BNSF tracks, but makes no stop. The nearest station is located in Williston, 21 miles (34 km) to the southwest.

== Education ==
It is within the Nesson School District (Ray Public School).

In 1977, the Epping High School boys' basketball team earned its first-ever trip to the Class B State Tournament, by defeating Watford City in the Region 7 championship game. It was Epping's third victory over Watford City that year; earlier, in a regular season game. Epping defeated Watford City for the first time in school history.

At the State Tournament in Bismarck, the Eagles defeated Turtle Lake-Mercer and Wing, then lost to Hillsboro 56-52 in the Class B State championship game. At the time, Epping High had only 23 students, the smallest public high school in the state. Meanwhile, Hillsboro, with 210 students, was the largest Class B school in the state. Epping and its basketball team received nationwide publicity after the Eagles' success was reported by Paul Harvey on his popular syndicated radio program.

== Climate ==
According to the Köppen Climate Classification system, Epping has a semi-arid climate, abbreviated "BSk" on climate maps.
