= Tioga School District =

School district in North Dakota, United States

Address
- 303 N Linda Street Tioga, North Dakota, 58852; United States

District information
- Type: Public
- Grades: PreK–12
- NCES District ID: 3800039

Students and staff
- Students: 485
- Teachers: 35.5
- Staff: 45.13
- Student–teacher ratio: 13.66

Other information
- Website: www.tioga.k12.nd.us

Tioga Public School District 15 is a school district headquartered in Tioga, North Dakota.

The district headquarters and Tioga High School are co-located while Central Elementary School is in a separate facility.

Within Williams County it includes Tioga and McGregor. Within Mountrail County it includes White Earth. It also includes sections of Burke and Divide counties.

Prior to the 2021 disestablishment of the New School District 8 (later the Williams County School District 8), some students from that district went to Tioga High School for high school.

== History ==
Circa 1990 the district sued a company over asbestos in the school buildings, and a jury determined the district should receive $75,000 to punish the company and an additional $756,906 to compensate the district.

From circa 2008 to 2014, the number of elementary school students increased by over 150%, and in 2014 the district had 270 students. In January 2014 the district voters approved a bond measure, worth $9,900,000, with over 70% of voters approving.

In 2014 the district's voters passed an election for a $9,900,000 bond.
