= Nesson School District =

School district in North Dakota, USA

Address
- 224 2nd Avenue W Ray, North Dakota, 58849; United States

District information
- Type: Public
- Grades: PreK–12
- NCES District ID: 3813710

Students and staff
- Students: 392
- Teachers: 24.62
- Staff: 27.97
- Student–teacher ratio: 15.92

Other information
- Website: www.ray.k12.nd.us

Nesson Public School District 2 is a school district headquartered in Ray, North Dakota, consisting of Ray Public School.

Within Williams County it serves Ray, Epping, Springbrook, and Wildrose. A small section is in Divide County.

Prior to the 2021 disestablishment of the New School District 8 (later the Williams County School District 8), some students from that district went to Ray Public School for high school.

== History ==
In 2000 Heidi Heitkamp, the Attorney General of North Dakota, stated that the district violated the North Dakota Open Meetings Act by closing a meeting to the public.

Circa 2017 the district had received a rapid enrollment grant.
