= Wildrose, North Dakota =

Wildrose
- City
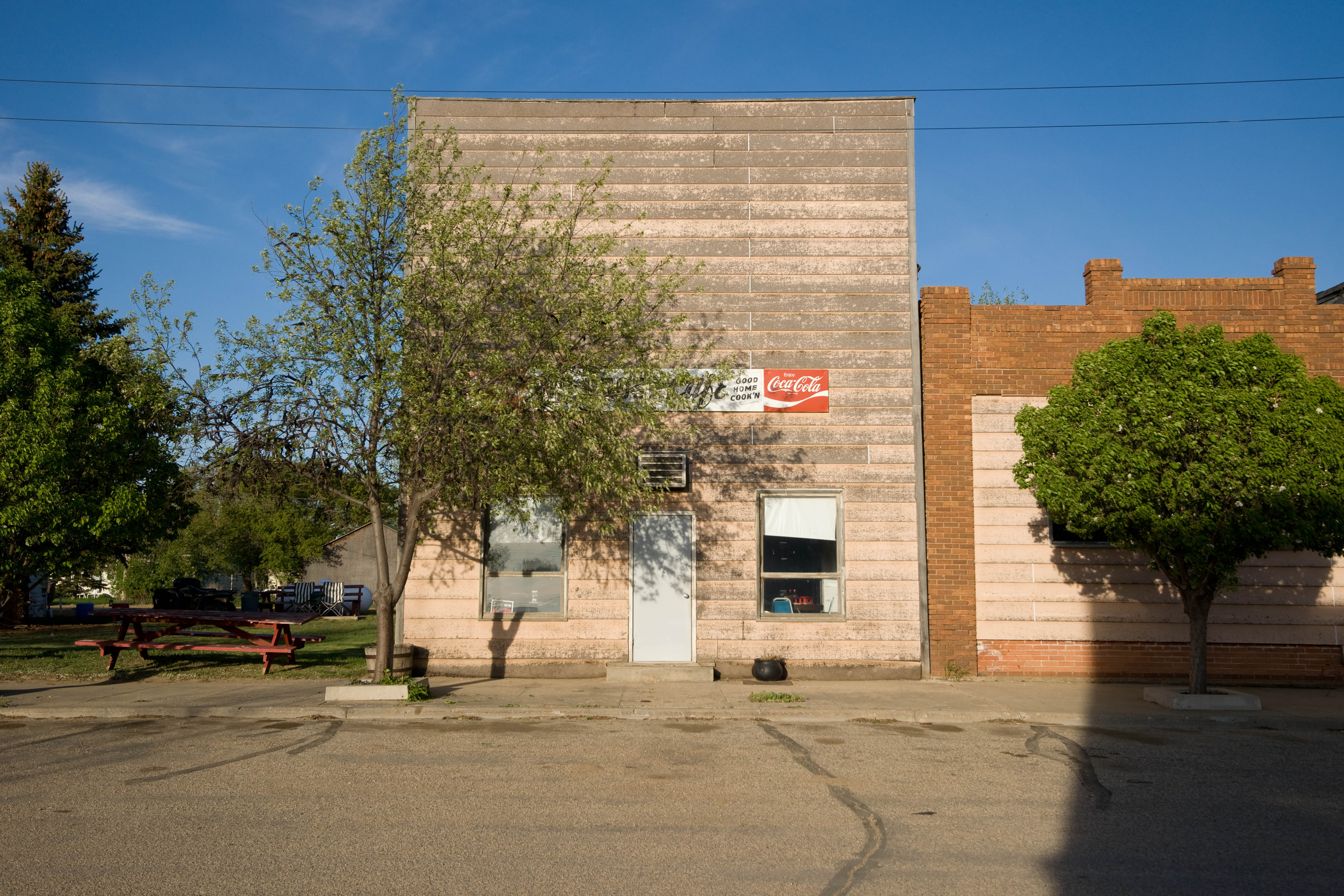
- Cafe in Wildrose

- Location of Wildrose, North Dakota
- Coordinates: 48°37′48″N 103°11′01″W
- Country: United States
- State: North Dakota
- County: Williams
- Founded: 1910

Area
  - Total: 0.29 sq mi (0.75 km^{2})
  - Land: 0.29 sq mi (0.75 km^{2})
  - Water: 0 sq mi (0.00 km^{2})
- Elevation: 2,251 ft (686 m)

Population (2020)
  - Total: 115
  - Estimate (2022): 106
  - Density: 396.0/sq mi (152.88/km^{2})
- Time zone: UTC-6 (Central (CST))
  - Summer (DST): UTC-5 (CDT)
- ZIP code: 58795
- Area code: 701
- FIPS code: 38-86020
- GNIS feature ID: 1036334
- Website: wildrosend.org

Wildrose is a city in Williams County, North Dakota, United States. The population was 115 at the 2020 census. Wildrose was founded in 1910.

== Geography ==
According to the United States Census Bureau, the city has a total area of 0.29 square miles (0.75 km^{2}), all land.

== Demographics ==
Historical population
Census	Pop.	Note	%±
1920	449		—
1930	518		15.4%
1940	472		−8.9%
1950	430		−8.9%
1960	361		−16.0%
1970	235		−34.9%
1980	214		−8.9%
1990	193		−9.8%
2000	129		−33.2%
2010	110		−14.7%
2020	115		4.5%
2022 (est.)	106		−7.8%
U.S. Decennial Census; 2020 Census

=== 2010 census ===
As of the census of 2010, there were 110 people, 63 households, and 27 families residing in the city. The population density was 379.3 inhabitants per square mile (146.4/km^{2}). There were 91 housing units at an average density of 313.8 per square mile (121.2/km^{2}). The racial makeup of the city was 96.4% White, 2.7% Native American, and 0.9% from two or more races. Hispanic or Latino of any race were 4.5% of the population.

There were 63 households, of which 14.3% had children under the age of 18 living with them, 36.5% were married couples living together, 6.3% had a female householder with no husband present, and 57.1% were non-families. 47.6% of all households were made up of individuals, and 22.2% had someone living alone who was 65 years of age or older. The average household size was 1.75 and the average family size was 2.52.

The median age in the city was 52.6 years. 12.7% of residents were under the age of 18; 3.5% were between the ages of 18 and 24; 14.5% were from 25 to 44; 46.4% were from 45 to 64; and 22.7% were 65 years of age or older. The gender makeup of the city was 49.1% male and 50.9% female.

=== 2000 census ===
As of the census of 2000, there were 129 people, 63 households, and 36 families residing in the city. The population density was 464.4 inhabitants per square mile (179.3/km^{2}). There were 102 housing units at an average density of 367.2 per square mile (141.8/km^{2}). The racial makeup of the city was 96.90% White and 3.10% Asian.

There were 63 households, out of which 19.0% had children under the age of 18 living with them, 44.4% were married couples living together, 14.3% had a female householder with no husband present, and 41.3% were non-families. 41.3% of all households were made up of individuals, and 15.9% had someone living alone who was 65 years of age or older. The average household size was 2.05 and the average family size was 2.76.

In the city, the population was spread out, with 22.5% under the age of 18, 4.7% from 18 to 24, 24.8% from 25 to 44, 22.5% from 45 to 64, and 25.6% who were 65 years of age or older. The median age was 43 years. For every 100 females, there were 101.6 males. For every 100 females age 18 and over, there were 104.1 males.

The median income for a household in the city was $19,167, and the median income for a family was $21,250. Males had a median income of $36,875 versus $17,250 for females. The per capita income for the city was $11,052. There were 19.4% of families and 13.5% of the population living below the poverty line, including 11.1% of under eighteens and 12.8% of those over 64.

== Climate ==
This climatic region is typified by large seasonal temperature differences, with warm to hot (and often humid) summers and cold (sometimes severely cold) winters. According to the Köppen Climate Classification system, Wildrose has a humid continental climate, abbreviated "Dfb" on climate maps.

Climate data for Wildrose 3NW, North Dakota, 1991–2020 normals, 1934-2020 extremes: 2227ft (679m)
Month	Jan	Feb	Mar	Apr	May	Jun	Jul	Aug	Sep	Oct	Nov	Dec	Year
Record high °F (°C)	53 (12)	63 (17)	74 (23)	91 (33)	99 (37)	105 (41)	111 (44)	103 (39)	100 (38)	91 (33)	73 (23)	54 (12)	111 (44)
Mean maximum °F (°C)	40.9 (4.9)	44.1 (6.7)	59.8 (15.4)	77.9 (25.5)	86.3 (30.2)	90.0 (32.2)	94.4 (34.7)	95.2 (35.1)	89.9 (32.2)	77.7 (25.4)	58.2 (14.6)	42.2 (5.7)	97.5 (36.4)
Mean daily maximum °F (°C)	18.0 (−7.8)	22.3 (−5.4)	34.8 (1.6)	51.8 (11.0)	64.6 (18.1)	73.2 (22.9)	79.3 (26.3)	80.3 (26.8)	70.1 (21.2)	52.9 (11.6)	35.2 (1.8)	22.5 (−5.3)	50.4 (10.2)
Daily mean °F (°C)	8.2 (−13.2)	12.2 (−11.0)	24.7 (−4.1)	39.6 (4.2)	52.1 (11.2)	61.4 (16.3)	66.7 (19.3)	66.2 (19.0)	55.9 (13.3)	40.9 (4.9)	25.2 (−3.8)	13.1 (−10.5)	38.8 (3.8)
Mean daily minimum °F (°C)	−1.7 (−18.7)	2.0 (−16.7)	14.6 (−9.7)	27.4 (−2.6)	39.5 (4.2)	49.5 (9.7)	54.2 (12.3)	52.0 (11.1)	41.8 (5.4)	28.8 (−1.8)	15.2 (−9.3)	3.8 (−15.7)	27.3 (−2.6)
Mean minimum °F (°C)	−26.8 (−32.7)	−22.7 (−30.4)	−8.7 (−22.6)	11.9 (−11.2)	24.6 (−4.1)	37.8 (3.2)	44.0 (6.7)	39.7 (4.3)	26.7 (−2.9)	11.1 (−11.6)	−4.8 (−20.4)	−22.5 (−30.3)	−31.5 (−35.3)
Record low °F (°C)	−46 (−43)	−44 (−42)	−32 (−36)	−16 (−27)	15 (−9)	27 (−3)	34 (1)	28 (−2)	15 (−9)	−4 (−20)	−27 (−33)	−42 (−41)	−46 (−43)
Average precipitation inches (mm)	0.59 (15)	0.39 (9.9)	0.66 (17)	1.02 (26)	2.23 (57)	3.38 (86)	3.08 (78)	1.55 (39)	1.41 (36)	1.16 (29)	0.56 (14)	0.62 (16)	16.65 (422.9)
Average snowfall inches (cm)	7.80 (19.8)	5.30 (13.5)	4.00 (10.2)	2.50 (6.4)	1.00 (2.5)	0.00 (0.00)	0.00 (0.00)	0.00 (0.00)	0.00 (0.00)	3.70 (9.4)	5.40 (13.7)	7.60 (19.3)	37.3 (94.8)
Source 1: NOAA
Source 2: XMACIS (records & 1981-2010 monthly max/mins)

== Education ==
It is within the Nesson School District (Ray Public School).
