= McGregor, North Dakota =

McGregor
- Census-designated place
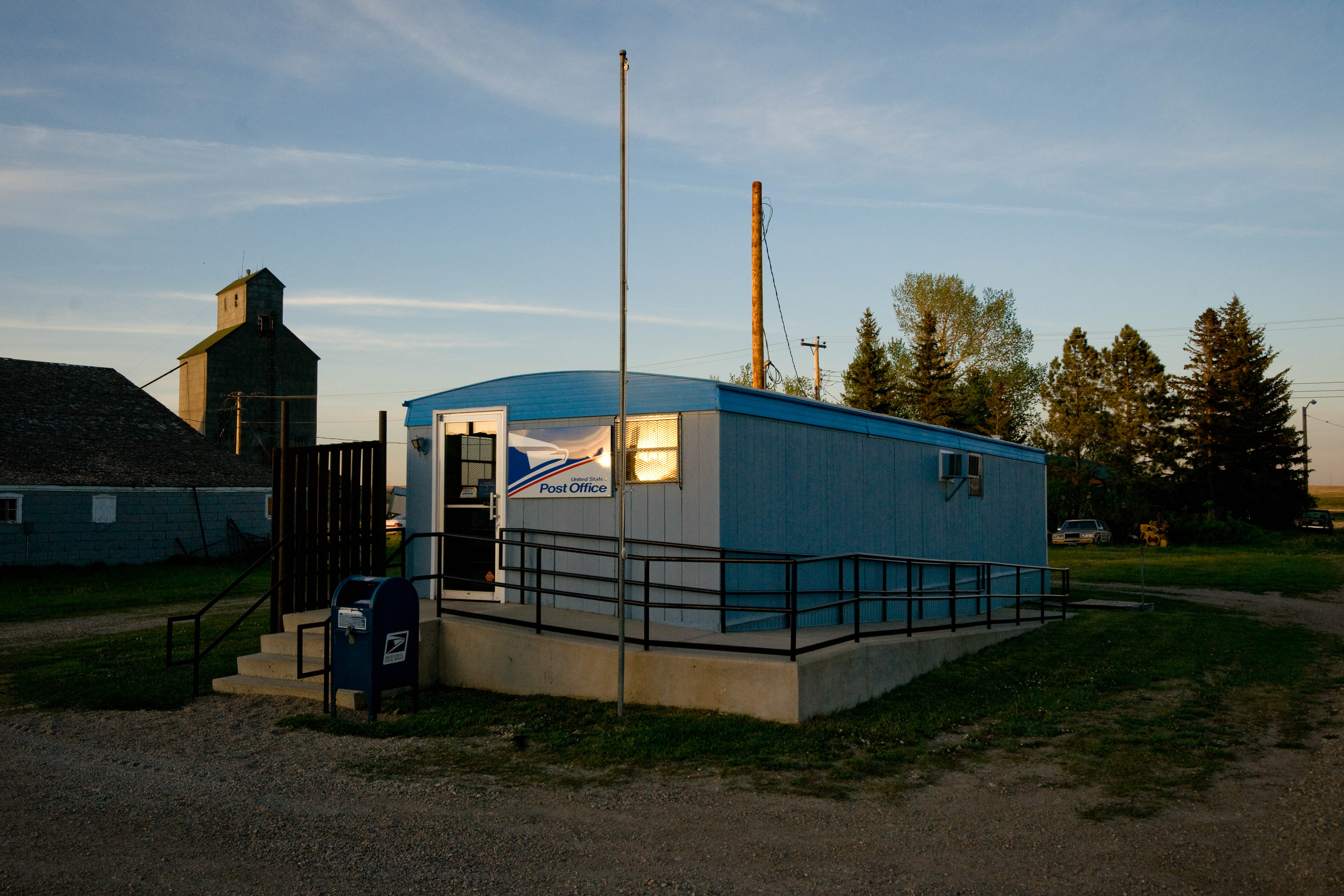
- Post office in McGregor

- Location within the state of North Dakota McGregor (the United States)
- Coordinates: 48°35′44″N 102°55′41″W
- Country: United States
- State: North Dakota
- County: Williams

Area
  - Total: 0.13 sq mi (0.33 km^{2})
  - Land: 0.13 sq mi (0.33 km^{2})
  - Water: 0 sq mi (0.00 km^{2})
- Elevation: 2,218 ft (676 m)

Population (2020)
  - Total: 47
  - Density: 372.8/sq mi (143.94/km^{2})
- Time zone: UTC-6 (Central (CST))
  - Summer (DST): UTC-5 (CDT)
- ZIP codes: 58755
- Area code: 701
- FIPS code: 38-49220
- GNIS feature ID: 2805290

McGregor is an unincorporated community and census-designated place (CDP) in northeastern Williams County, North Dakota, United States. It lies along North Dakota Highway 40, northeast of the city of Williston, the county seat of Williams County. McGregor's elevation is 2,218 feet (676 m). Although unincorporated, it has a post office, with the ZIP code of 58755. It was first listed as a CDP prior to the 2020 census. As of the 2020 census, McGregor had a population of 47.

== Demographics ==
Historical population
Census	Pop.	Note	%±
2020	47		—
U.S. Decennial Census

McGregor first appeared as a census designated place in the 2020 U.S. census.

== Education ==
It is within the Tioga School District.
