= Ray, North Dakota =

- City
- Logo
- Motto: "The Grain Palace City"
- Location of Ray, North Dakota
- Coordinates: 48°20′30″N 103°09′48″W
- Country: United States
- State: North Dakota
- County: Williams
- Founded: 1902
- Incorporated: March 3, 1902

Government
  - Auditor: Ronda Rustad
  - Deputy Officer: Jan Dancer

Area
  - Total: 1.356 sq mi (3.512 km^{2})
  - Land: 1.320 sq mi (3.418 km^{2})
  - Water: 0.036 sq mi (0.094 km^{2})
- Elevation: 2,270 ft (692 m)

Population (2020)
  - Total: 740
  - Estimate (2023): 723
  - Density: 547.8/sq mi (211.49/km^{2})
- Time zone: UTC–6 (Central (CST))
  - Summer (DST): UTC–5 (CDT)
- ZIP Code: 58849
- Area code: 701
- FIPS code: 38-65580
- GNIS feature ID: 1036231
- Sales tax: 8.0%
- Website: raynd.com

Ray is a city in Williams County, North Dakota, United States. The population was 740 at the 2020 census.

== History ==
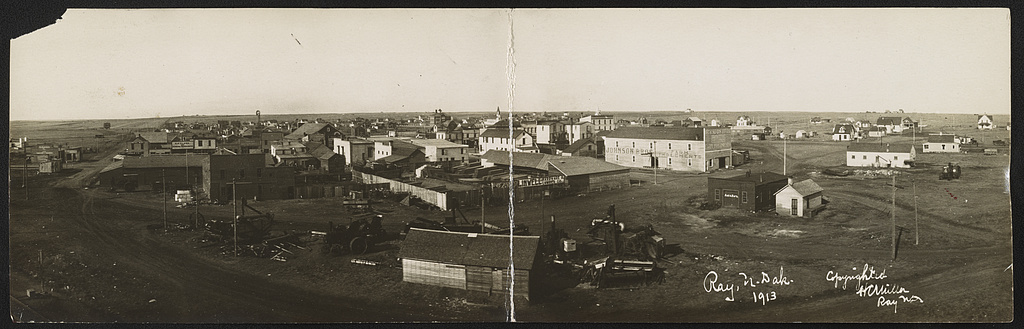
Ray, North Dakota (panorama postcard)

Ray was founded in 1902. The city was named in honor of William G. Ray, a railroad official. A post office has been in operation at Ray since 1902.

== Geography ==
According to the United States Census Bureau, the city has an area of 1.356 square miles (3.51 km^{2}), of which 1.320 square miles (3.42 km^{2}) is land and 0.036 square miles (0.09 km^{2}) is water.

== Demographics ==
Historical population
Census	Pop.	Note	%±
1910	436		—
1920	563		29.1%
1930	621		10.3%
1940	579		−6.8%
1950	721		24.5%
1960	1,049		45.5%
1970	776		−26.0%
1980	766		−1.3%
1990	603		−21.3%
2000	534		−11.4%
2010	592		10.9%
2020	740		25.0%
2023 (est.)	723		−2.3%
U.S. Decennial Census; 2020 Census

=== 2020 census ===
Ray, North Dakota – Racial Composition (NH = Non-Hispanic) Note: the US Census treats Hispanic/Latino as an ethnic category. This table excludes Latinos from the racial categories and assigns them to a separate category. Hispanics/Latinos can be of any race.
Race	Number	Percentage
White (NH)	660	89.2%
Black or African American (NH)	1	0.1%
Native American or Alaska Native (NH)	13	1.8%
Asian (NH)	3	0.4%
Pacific Islander (NH)	0	0.0%
Some Other Race (NH)	1	0.1%
Mixed/Multi-Racial (NH)	41	5.5%
Hispanic or Latino	21	2.8%
Total	740	100.0%

As of the 2020 census, there were 740 people, 283 households, and 187 families residing in the city. There were 361 housing units. The racial makeup of the city was 89.6% White, 0.1% African American, 1.8% Native American, 0.4% Asian, 0.0% Pacific Islander, 1.1% from some other races and 7.0% from two or more races. Hispanic or Latino of any race were 2.8% of the population.

=== 2010 census ===
As of the 2010 census, there were 592 people, 276 households, and 163 families residing in the city. The population density was 586.1 inhabitants per square mile (226.3/km^{2}). There were 301 housing units at an average density of 298.0 per square mile (115.1/km^{2}). The racial makeup of the city was 95.9% White, 2.5% Native American, 0.3% Asian, and 1.2% from two or more races. Hispanic or Latino of any race were 1.0% of the population.

There were 276 households, of which 22.1% had children under the age of 18 living with them, 51.8% were married couples living together, 4.3% had a female householder with no husband present, 2.9% had a male householder with no wife present, and 40.9% were non-families. 35.5% of all households were made up of individuals, and 14.4% had someone living alone who was 65 years of age or older. The average household size was 2.14 and the average family size was 2.78.

The median age in the city was 46.1 years. 20.8% of residents were under the age of 18; 7.5% were between the ages of 18 and 24; 20.3% were from 25 to 44; 35% were from 45 to 64; and 16.4% were 65 years of age or older. The gender makeup of the city was 53.2% male and 46.8% female.

=== 2000 census ===
As of the 2000 census, there were 534 people, 232 households, and 154 families residing in the city. The population density was 531.5 inhabitants per square mile (205.2/km^{2}). There were 296 housing units at an average density of 294.6 per square mile (113.7/km^{2}). The racial makeup of the city was 99.06% White, 0.56% Native American, and 0.37% from two or more races. Hispanic or Latino of any race were 0.56% of the population.

There were 232 households, out of which 27.6% had children under the age of 18 living with them, 59.9% were married couples living together, 4.3% had a female householder with no husband present, and 33.6% were non-families. 32.3% of all households were made up of individuals, and 18.1% had someone living alone who was 65 years of age or older. The average household size was 2.30 and the average family size was 2.90.

In the city, the population was spread out, with 23.8% under the age of 18, 4.9% from 18 to 24, 21.9% from 25 to 44, 29.0% from 45 to 64, and 20.4% who were 65 years of age or older. The median age was 45 years. For every 100 females, there were 101.5 males. For every 100 females age 18 and over, there were 101.5 males.

The median income for a household in the city was $31,563, and the median income for a family was $41,771. Males had a median income of $34,063 versus $18,125 for females. The per capita income for the city was $16,064. About 2.6% of families and 3.7% of the population were below the poverty line, including none of those under age 18 and 6.3% of those age 65 or over.

== Transportation ==
Amtrak's Empire Builder, which operates between Seattle/Portland and Chicago, passes through the town on BNSF tracks, but makes no stop. The nearest stations are located in Williston, 34 miles (55 km) to the southwest, and Stanley, 37 miles (60 km) to the east.

== Education ==
It is within the Nesson School District (Ray Public School).

== Notable people ==
- Delbert F. Anderson, farmer and member of the Minnesota House of Representatives, was born in Ray.
- Mary Sherman Morgan, inventor of Hydyne, which was combined with liquid oxygen to propel the first US rocket into orbit (1958), was born in Ray.
- Erin Oban, member of the North Dakota Senate and USDA Rural Development State Director of North Dakota, lived in Ray.
- Claudia Meier Volk, member of the Minnesota House of Representatives, lived in Ray.
