= Tioga, North Dakota =

- City
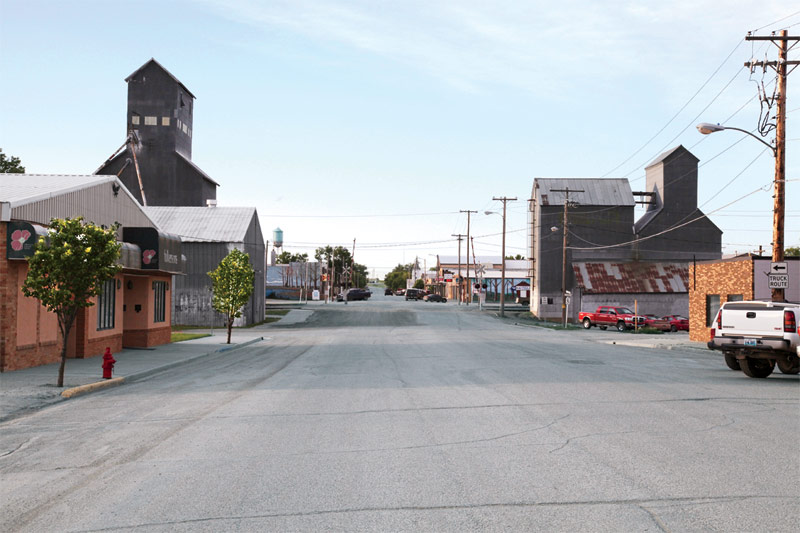
- Downtown Tioga

- Logo
- Motto: "Oil Capital of North Dakota"
- Location of Tioga, North Dakota
- Coordinates: 48°23′41″N 102°56′35″W
- Country: United States
- State: North Dakota
- County: Williams
- Founded: 1902
- Incorporated: 1910

Government
  - Mayor: Kevin Litten

Area
  - Total: 3.534 sq mi (9.153 km^{2})
  - Land: 3.380 sq mi (8.754 km^{2})
  - Water: 0.154 sq mi (0.399 km^{2})
- Elevation: 2,241 ft (683 m)

Population (2020)
  - Total: 2,202
  - Estimate (2023): 2,097
  - Density: 620/sq mi (239.5/km^{2})
- Time zone: UTC–6 (Central (CST))
  - Summer (DST): UTC–5 (CDT)
- ZIP Code: 58852
- Area code: 701
- FIPS code: 38-78940
- GNIS feature ID: 1036295
- Highways: ND 40
- Sales tax: 8.5%
- Website: tiogand.net

Tioga (/taɪˈoʊɡə/ ty-OH-gə) is a city in Williams County, North Dakota, United States. The population was 2,202 at the 2020 census.

Tioga was founded in 1902 and named by settlers from Tioga, New York. The population of the city increased dramatically in the 1950s following the discovery of oil nearby in the Williston Basin.

== Geography ==
According to the United States Census Bureau, the city has an area of 3.534 square miles (9.15 km^{2}), of which 3.380 square miles (8.75 km^{2}) is land and 0.154 square miles (0.40 km^{2}) is water.

== Demographics ==
Historical population
Census	Pop.	Note	%±
1910	203		—
1920	320		57.6%
1930	435		35.9%
1940	385		−11.5%
1950	456		18.4%
1960	2,087		357.7%
1970	1,667		−20.1%
1980	1,597		−4.2%
1990	1,278		−20.0%
2000	1,125		−12.0%
2010	1,230		9.3%
2020	2,202		79.0%
2023 (est.)	2,097		−4.8%
U.S. Decennial Census; 2020 Census

=== 2020 census ===
As of the 2020 census, there were 2,202 people, 972 households, and 518 families residing in the city. The population density was 659.7 inhabitants per square mile (254.7/km^{2}), and there were 1,322 housing units.

The median age was 35.1 years. 24.6% of residents were under the age of 18 and 11.6% were 65 years of age or older. For every 100 females, there were 124.7 males, and for every 100 females age 18 and over, there were 136.5 males. 0.0% of residents lived in urban areas, while 100.0% lived in rural areas.

Of the city's households, 28.7% had children under the age of 18 living in them. Of all households, 39.9% were married-couple households, 35.2% were households with a male householder and no spouse or partner present, and 16.5% were households with a female householder and no spouse or partner present. About 37.9% of all households were made up of individuals, and 9.3% had someone living alone who was 65 years of age or older. Of all housing units, 26.5% were vacant; the homeowner vacancy rate was 2.4% and the rental vacancy rate was 18.0%.

Tioga, North Dakota – Racial Composition (NH = Non-Hispanic) Note: the US Census treats Hispanic/Latino as an ethnic category. This table excludes Latinos from the racial categories and assigns them to a separate category. Hispanics/Latinos can be of any race.
Race	Number	Percentage
White (NH)	1,748	79.4%
Black or African American (NH)	35	1.6%
Native American or Alaska Native (NH)	19	0.9%
Asian (NH)	21	1.0%
Pacific Islander (NH)	0	0.0%
Some Other Race (NH)	13	0.6%
Mixed/Multi-Racial (NH)	66	3.0%
Hispanic or Latino	300	13.6%
Total	2,202	100.0%

=== 2010 census ===
As of the 2010 census, there were 1,230 people, 542 households, and 323 families living in the city. The population density was 938.9 inhabitants per square mile (362.5/km^{2}). There were 619 housing units at an average density of 472.5 per square mile (182.4/km^{2}). The racial makeup of the city was 96.9% White, 0.1% African American, 0.5% Native American, 0.6% Asian, 0.1% Pacific Islander, 0.2% from other races, and 1.7% from two or more races. Hispanic or Latino of any race were 0.7% of the population.

There were 542 households, of which 24.7% had children under the age of 18 living with them, 48.2% were married couples living together, 6.1% had a female householder with no husband present, 5.4% had a male householder with no wife present, and 40.4% were non-families. 34.5% of all households were made up of individuals, and 16.8% had someone living alone who was 65 years of age or older. The average household size was 2.16 and the average family size was 2.72.

The median age in the city was 47.4 years. 18.5% of residents were under the age of 18; 7.1% were between the ages of 18 and 24; 21.5% were from 25 to 44; 27.6% were from 45 to 64; and 25.4% were 65 years of age or older. The gender makeup of the city was 50.8% male and 49.2% female.

=== 2000 census ===
As of the 2000 census, there were 1,125 people, 490 households, and 311 families living in the city. The population density was 856.1 inhabitants per square mile (330.5/km^{2}). There were 569 housing units at an average density of 433.0 per square mile (167.2/km^{2}). The racial makeup of the city was 97.42% White, 0.18% black, 0.89% Indigenous American, 0.18% from other races, and 1.33% from two or more races. Hispanic or Latino of any race were 0.09% of the population.

There were 490 households, out of which 25.5% had children under the age of 18 living with them, 54.5% were married couples living together, 6.3% had a female householder with no husband present, and 36.5% were non-families. 34.9% of all households were made up of individuals, and 23.7% had someone living alone who was 65 years of age or older. The average household size was 2.22 and the average family size was 2.86.

In the city, the population was spread out, with 22.5% under the age of 18, 4.2% from 18 to 24, 23.4% from 25 to 44, 23.5% from 45 to 64, and 26.5% who were 65 years of age or older. The median age was 45 years. For every 100 females, there were 86.0 males. For every 100 females age 18 and over, there were 84.7 males.

The median income for a household in the city was $29,740, and the median income for a family was $36,635. Males had a median income of $31,500 versus $21,181 for females. The per capita income for the city was $16,910. About 3.5% of families and 7.0% of the population were below the poverty line, including 6.0% of those under age 18 and 11.5% of those age 65 or over.

== Education ==
The city is served by the Tioga School District, which hosts Central Elementary School and Tioga High School within its borders.

== Infrastructure and transport ==
=== Petroleum industry ===
Tioga is located eight miles north of the Clarence Iverson farm, where Hess Corporation discovered oil and sparked a statewide oil boom. The company presently operates and owns oil producing facilities with numerous local businesses supporting the oil industry, and Tioga is located nine miles north of North Dakota's sole oil refinery, which is presently owned by Tesoro after it was sold to it by BP in 2001.

=== Transport ===
Tioga's center is just to the southwest of Williams County Road 10 with North Dakota Highway 40, and is just north of ND 40's southern terminus at U.S. Route 2. Tioga is located along freight railroad tracks which presently belong to BNSF Railway.

Amtrak's Empire Builder, which operates between Seattle/Portland and Chicago, passes through the town on BNSF tracks, but makes no stop. The nearest station is located in Stanley, 30 miles (48 km) to the east.

A general aviation airport, Tioga Municipal Airport (FAA code D60) is located two miles southeast of the city, with a main paved runway (12/30) just under one mile long and 75 feet wide (1555 meters long and 23 meters wide) and a secondary turf runway (3/21) which is 3200 feet (975 meters) long and 120 feet (37 meters) wide. Commercial air travel to the city, though, is limited beyond charter flights and private aviation, and the closest commercial airports are Williston Basin International Airport and Minot International Airport for domestic service, and Regina International Airport in Saskatchewan, Canada, for international service.

== Notable person ==
Katerina Lynn (fake name), used Tioga as their place of residence in her fabricated college application to Yale University. She was originally from the Bay Area, and while on campus, was known to have a BDSM relationship online with an older male, which sparked concern from peers and ultimately led to her expulsion from Yale on September 21, 2025.
