= Des Lacs National Wildlife Refuge Complex =

National Wildlife Refuge complex in North Dakota, US

Des Lacs National Wildlife Refuge Complex is a National Wildlife Refuge complex in the state of North Dakota.

== Refuges within the complex ==
- Crosby Wetland Management District
  - Lake Zahl National Wildlife Refuge
- Des Lacs National Wildlife Refuge
- Lostwood National Wildlife Refuge
- Lostwood Wetland Management District
