= Des Lacs (disambiguation) =

Des Lacs may refer to:

- Des Lacs, North Dakota
- Des Lacs National Wildlife Refuge Complex
  - Des Lacs National Wildlife Refuge
- Des Lacs River
