= Lostwood Wilderness =

Wilderness area in North Dakota, United States

- IUCN category Ib (wilderness area)
- Location within the United States
- Location: Burke County, North Dakota, USA
- Nearest city: Bowbells, ND
- Coordinates: 48°39′N 102°27′W
- Area: 5,577 acres (22.57 km^{2})
- Established: 1975
- Governing body: U.S. Fish and Wildlife Service

Lostwood Wilderness is a wilderness area located in the U.S. state of North Dakota. Created by an act of Congress in 1975, the wilderness covers an area of 5,577 acres (22.56 km^{2}). Contained within Lostwood National Wildlife Refuge, the wilderness is managed by the U.S. Fish and Wildlife Service.

Designated to preserve a region well known for numerous lakes and mixed grass prairie, the wilderness ensures that the finest duck and waterfowl breeding region in North America remains wild and unimproved.

U.S. Wilderness Areas do not allow motorized or mechanized vehicles, including bicycles. Although camping and fishing are usually allowed with a proper permit, no roads or buildings are constructed and there is also no logging or mining, in compliance with the 1964 Wilderness Act. Wilderness areas within National Forests and Bureau of Land Management areas also allow hunting in season.
