= Climate change in North Dakota =

Climate change in the US state of North Dakota

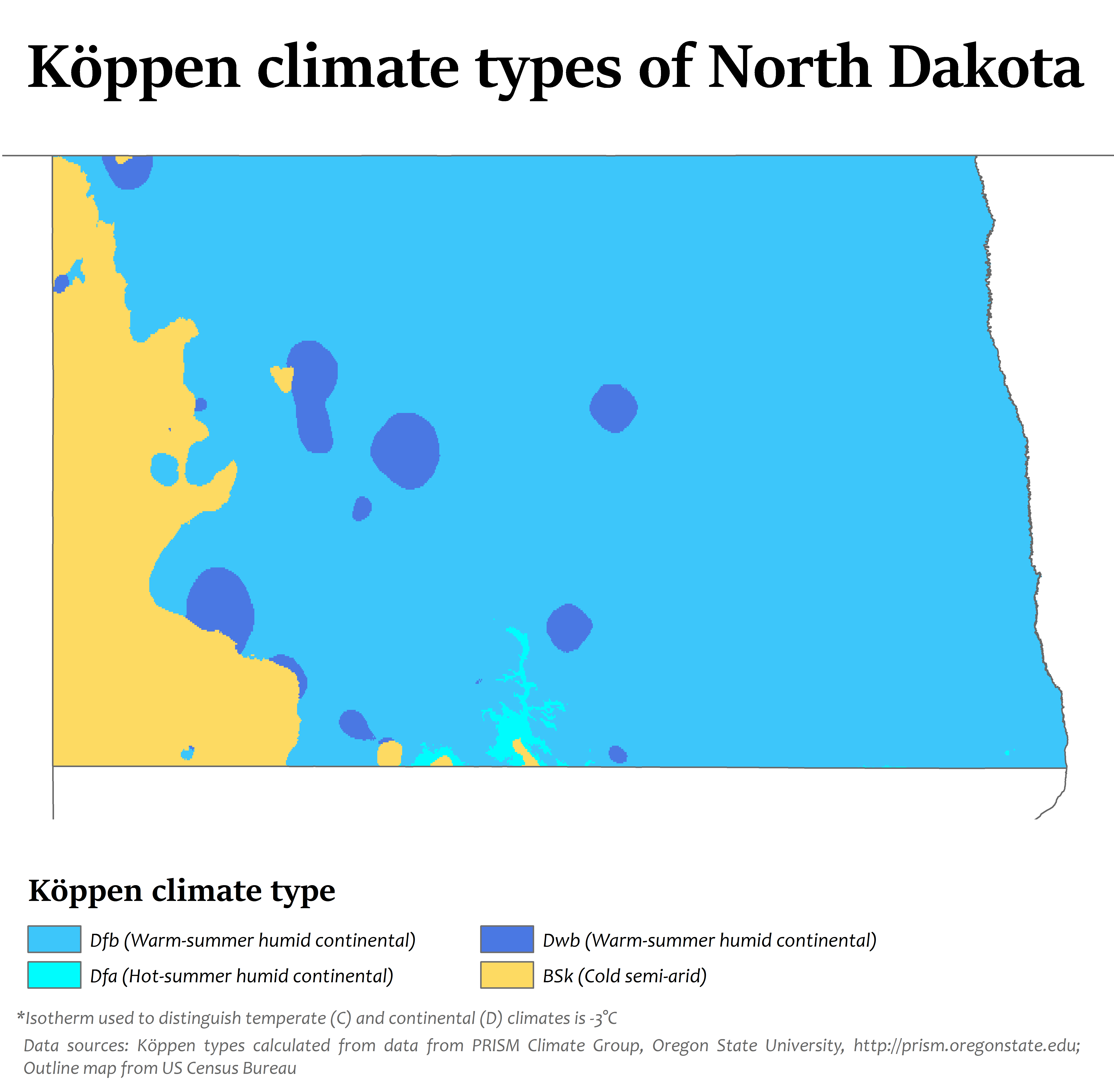
Köppen climate types in North Dakota, showing the state to be mostly warm-summer humid continental.

Climate change in North Dakota encompasses the effects of climate change, attributed to man-made increases in atmospheric carbon dioxide, in the U.S. state of North Dakota.

North Dakota is one of the northern tier states that has reported "more extreme weather in recent years, including more damaging hail storms, severe droughts, heavier rains, hotter temperatures and longer growing seasons". The United States Environmental Protection Agency reports: that "North Dakota's climate is changing. In the past century, most of the state has warmed about two degrees (F). Rainstorms are becoming more intense, and annual rainfall is increasing. In the coming decades, longer growing seasons are likely to create opportunities for farmers, and increasing rainfall may benefit some farms but increase the risk of flooding".

== Precipitation and water resources ==
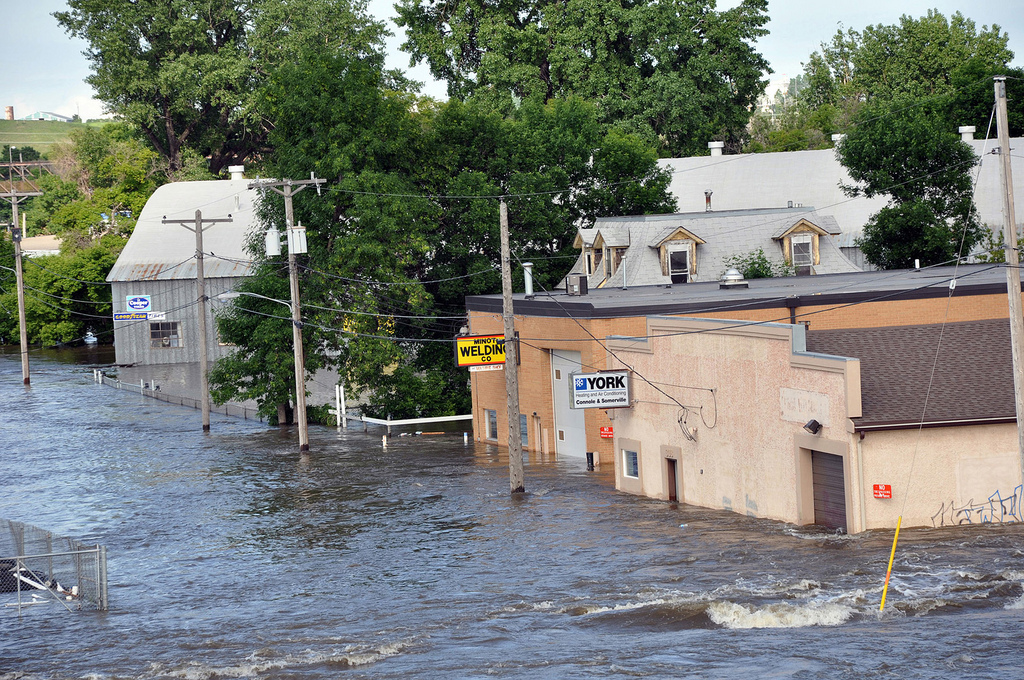
Flooded buildings, Minot, June 2011

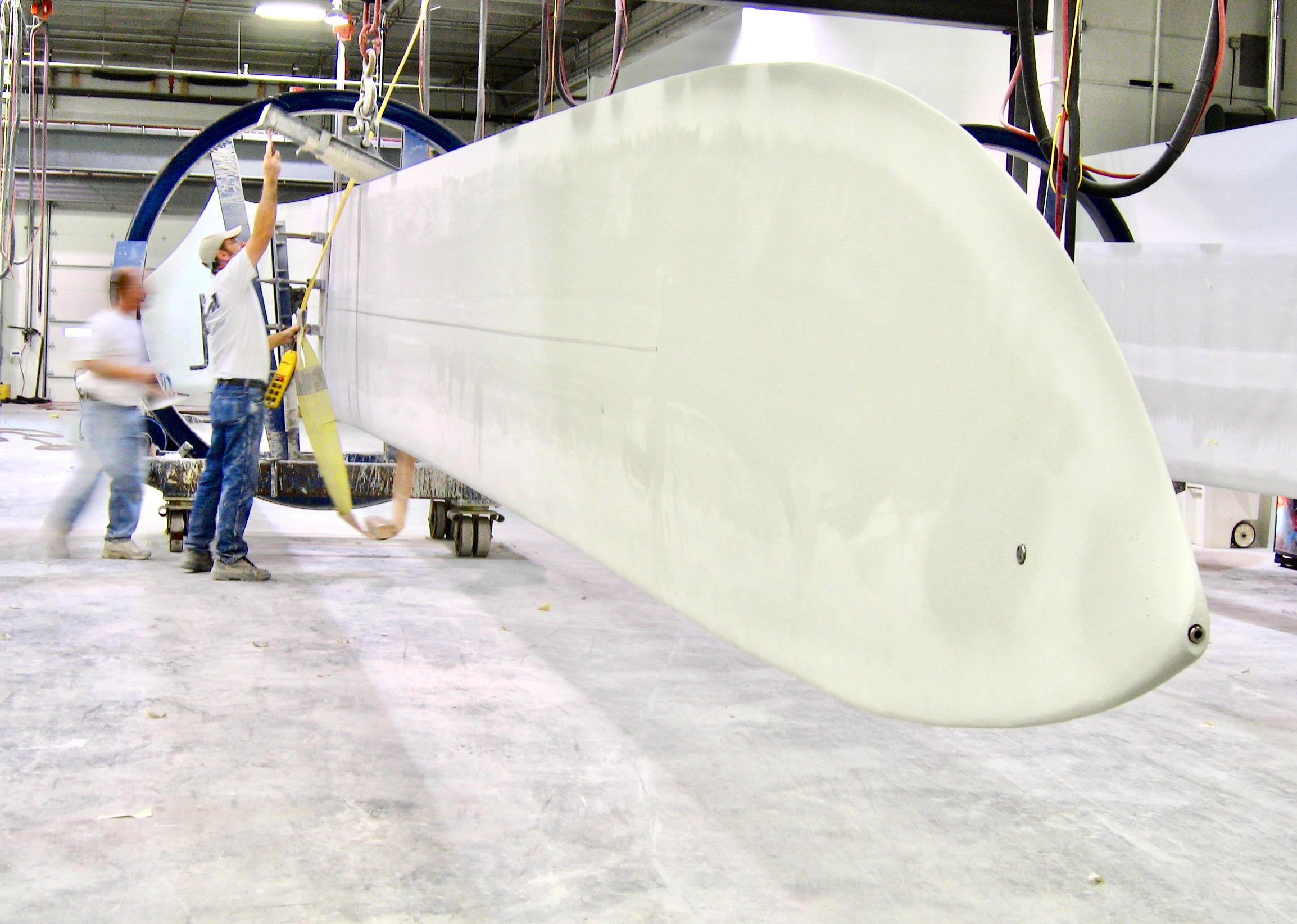
Wind turbine under construction, Grand Forks

"Changing the climate is likely to increase the demand for water and make it more available. Rising temperatures increase evaporation and water use by plants. But rainfall is also likely to increase, so soil moisture is likely to increase slightly or remain about the same as today. More water is likely to run off into the upper Missouri River and its tributaries.

The resulting increase in river flows could benefit recreational boating, public water supplies, and electric power generation. During droughts, decreased river flows can lower the water level in lakes and reservoirs, which may limit water supplies and impair swimming, fishing, and other recreational activities.

But if more water flows through the rivers before or during a drought, these problems will become less likely. Higher water flows also increase hydropower production, which accounts for about 5 percent of all energy produced in North Dakota. Nevertheless, droughts are likely to become more severe in downstream states. When droughts lower water levels enough to impair navigation, the U.S. Army Corps of Engineers releases water from the upstream dams, making less water available to North Dakota".

== Increased flooding ==
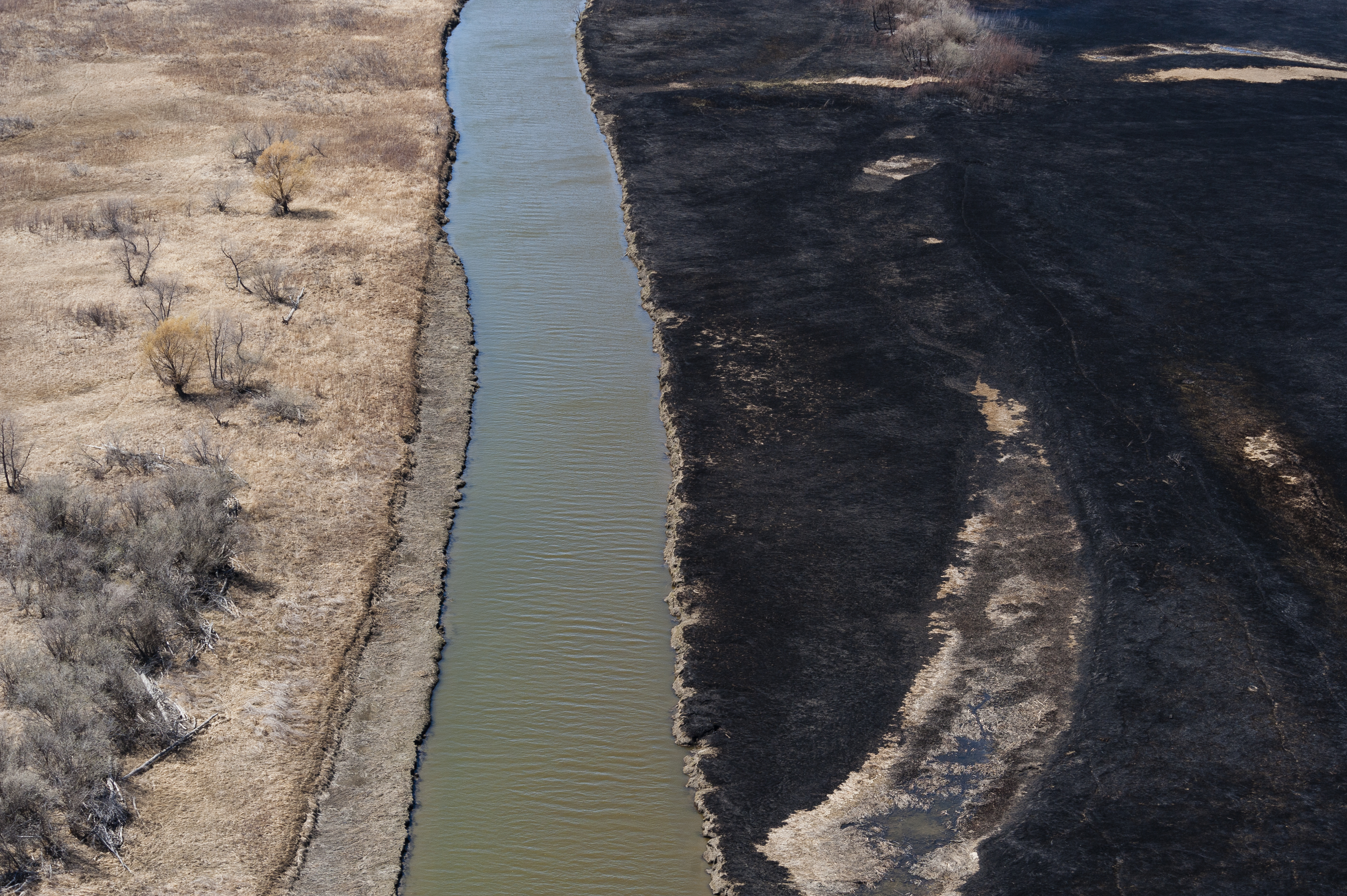
Wildfire aftermath, Burleigh County

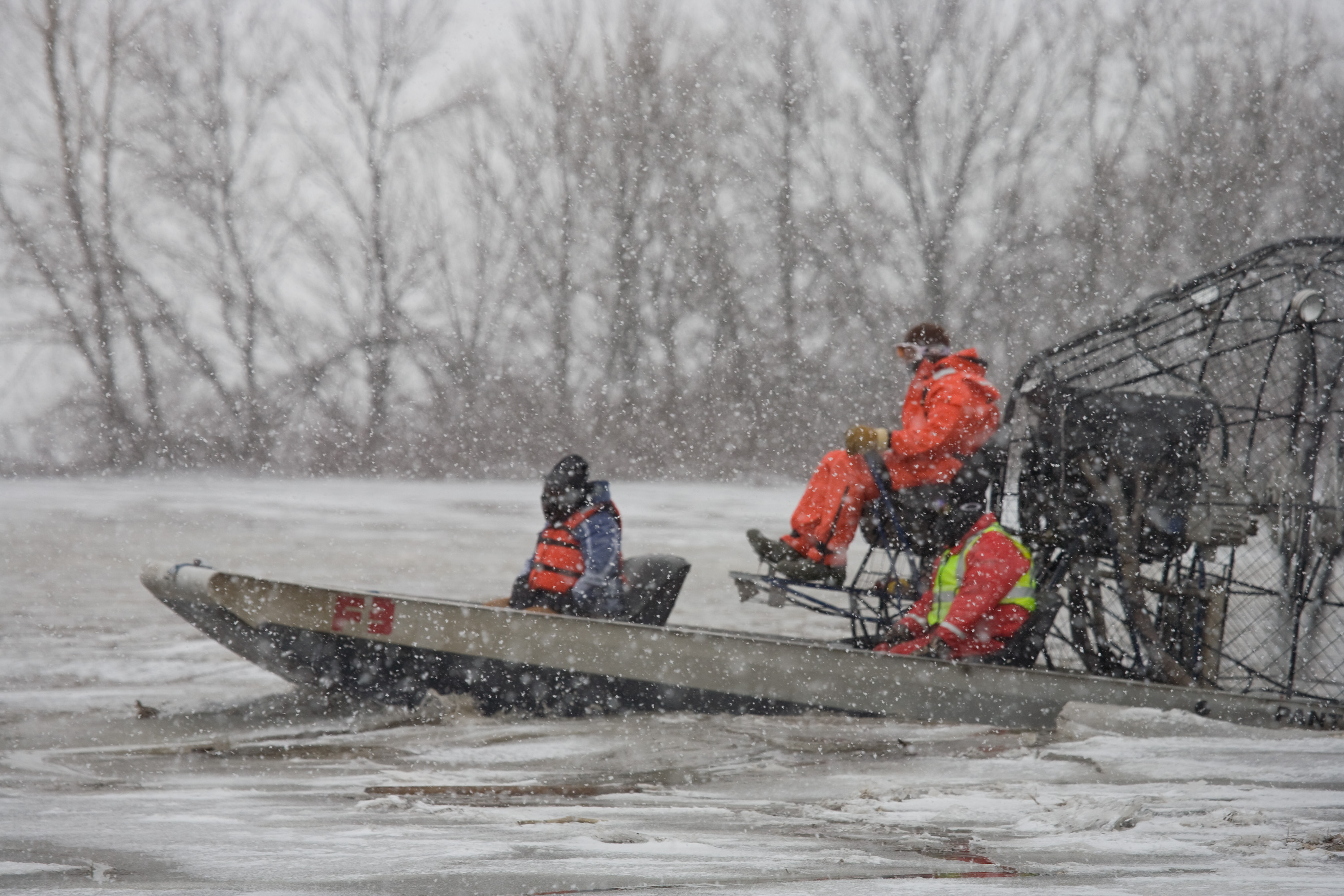
Search and rescue, 2009 floods, Cass County

"Greater river flows, increasing precipitation, and more severe storms are each likely to increase the risk of flooding.

The year 2011 was one of the wettest years on record: the Souris River near Minot crested at four feet above its previous record, with a flow five times greater than any in the past 30 years, and flooding occurred throughout the state. In the Red River watershed, river flows during the worst flood of the year have been increasing about 10 percent per decade since the 1920s".

== Heavy storms ==
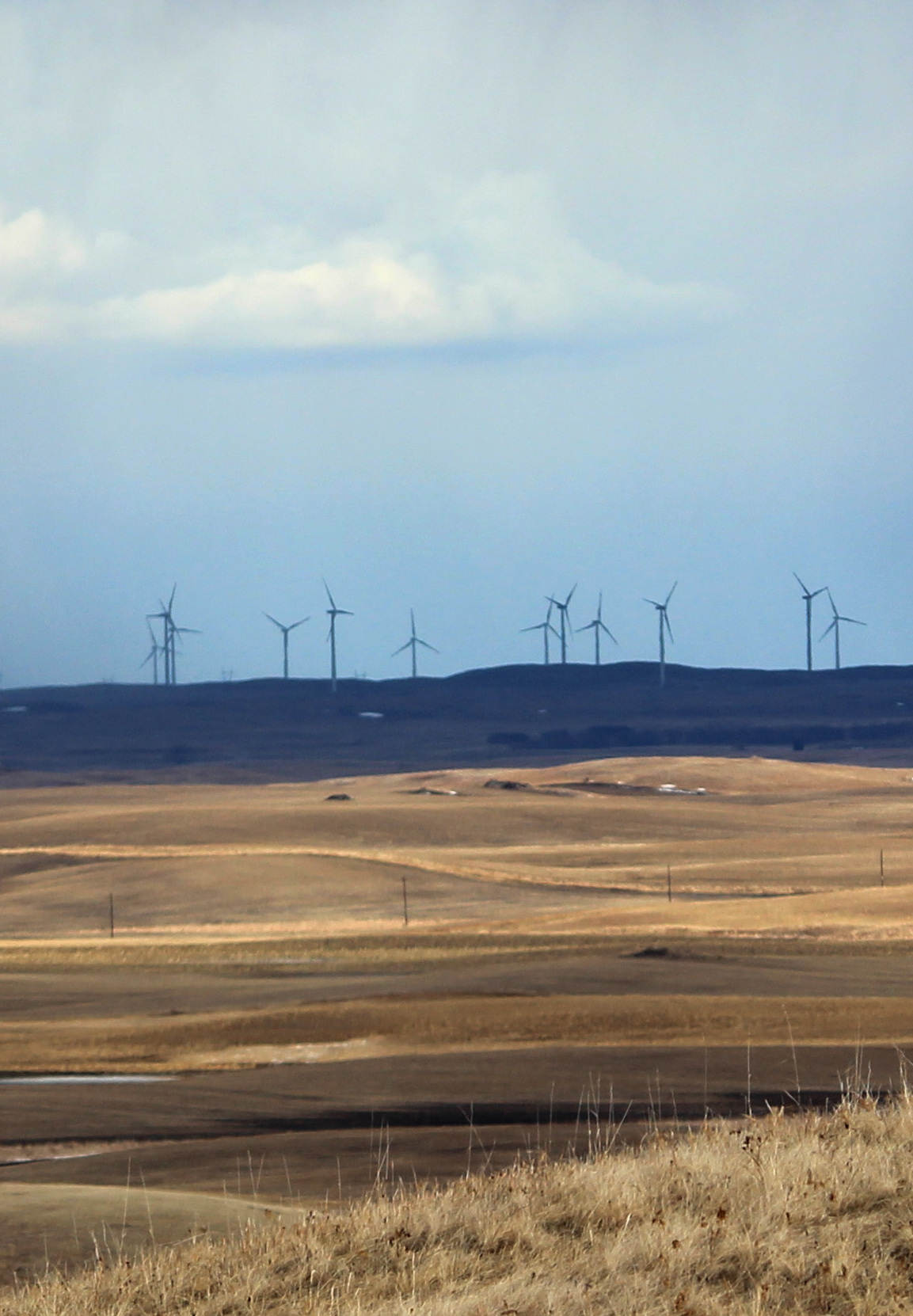
Tatanka Wind Farm

"Warmer air tends to have more water vapor, so more water can be potentially released in a storm. During the last 50 years, the amount of rain falling during the wettest four days of the year has increased about 15 percent in the Great Plains. Over the next several decades, heavy downpours are likely to account for an increasing fraction of all precipitation".

== Agriculture ==
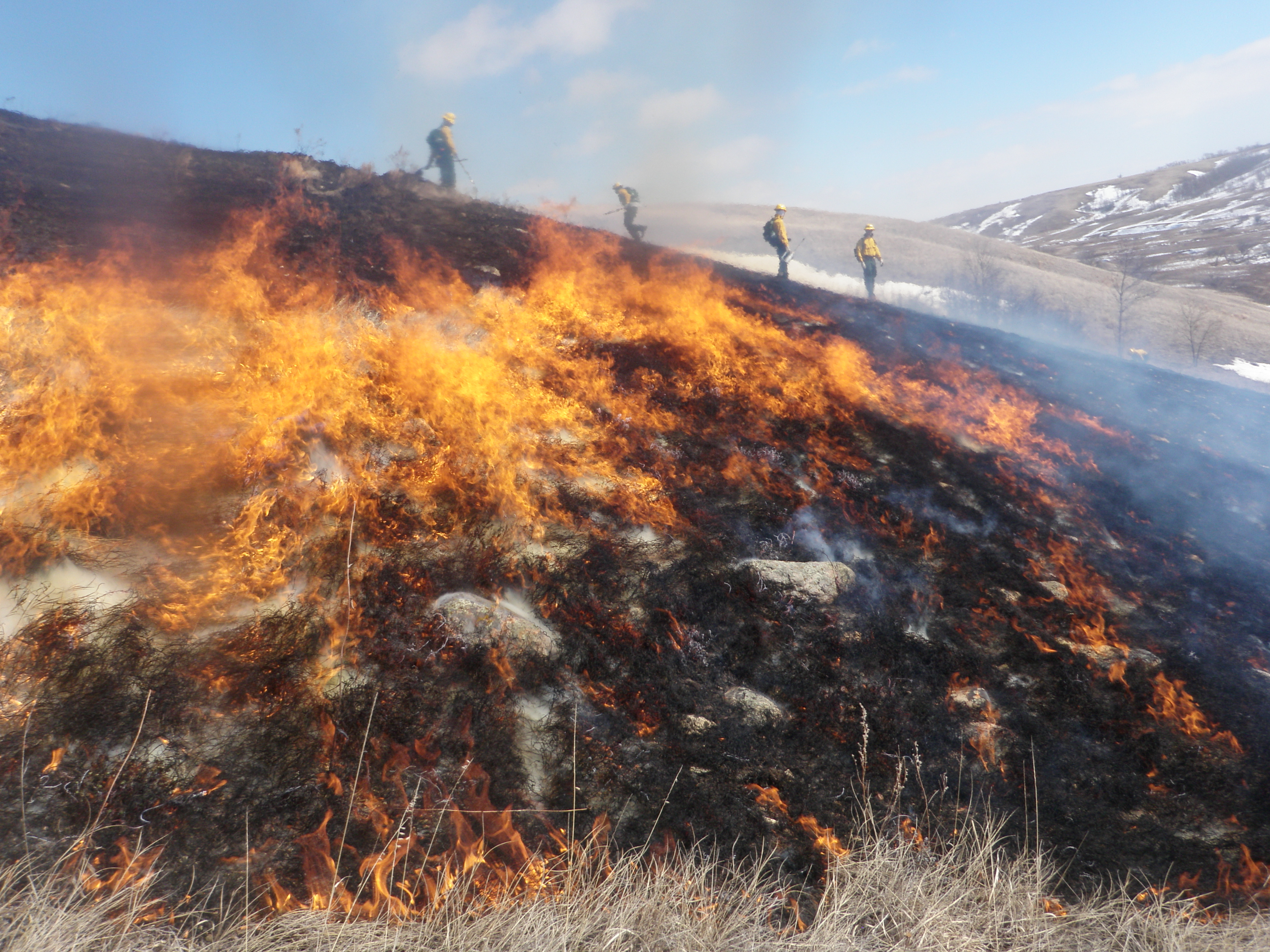
Prescribed burn, Des Lacs National Wildlife Refuge

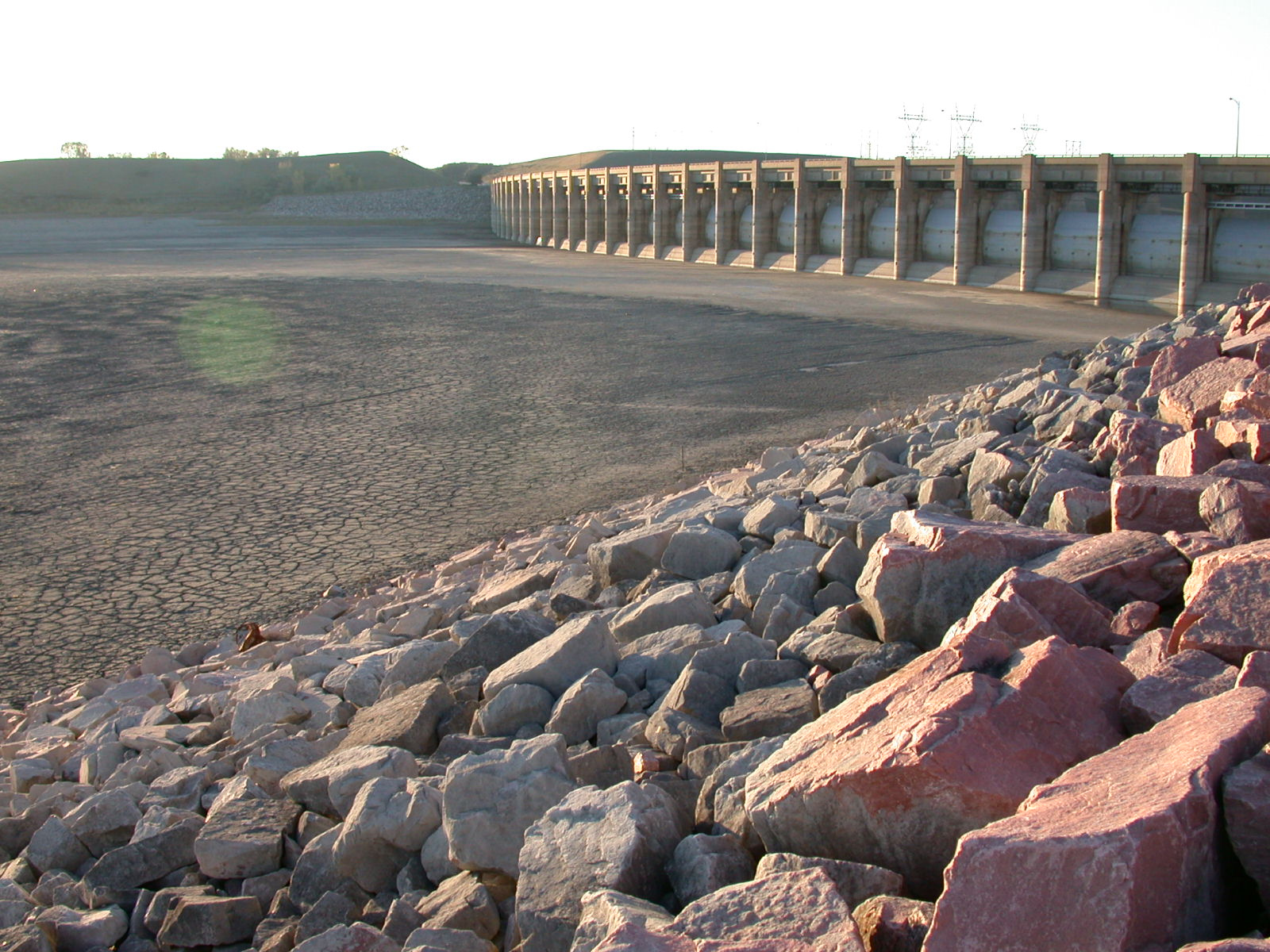
Empty spillway in drought, Garrison Dam, 2004

"Warmer temperatures have extended the growing season by about 30 days since the beginning of the 20th century. Corn and soybeans are now grown in areas that were previously too cold for those crops, and warmer temperatures are likely to increase corn yields in the future.

The fertilizing effect of increased concentrations of carbon dioxide is likely to further increase yields of corn and substantially increase yields of wheat and soybeans. The extended growing season might allow two crops per year instead of one in some instances. Increased precipitation at the beginning of the growing season is likely to help ensure that soils are sufficiently moist for the growing season".

"Although the longer growing season benefits most crops, planting dates might be delayed if increased winter and spring precipitation leaves some fields too wet to plant. Rising temperatures may also reduce yields of wheat, partly offsetting the fertilizing effect of carbon dioxide. Warmer winters may promote the growth of weeds and pests. During drought years, hotter summers will dry the soil more than would otherwise occur. Over the next 70 years, the number of days above 100°F is likely to double, which could further stress crops during drought years". North Dakota is among the states where "warm-season temperatures are expected to increase more than any other region".

== Ecosystems ==
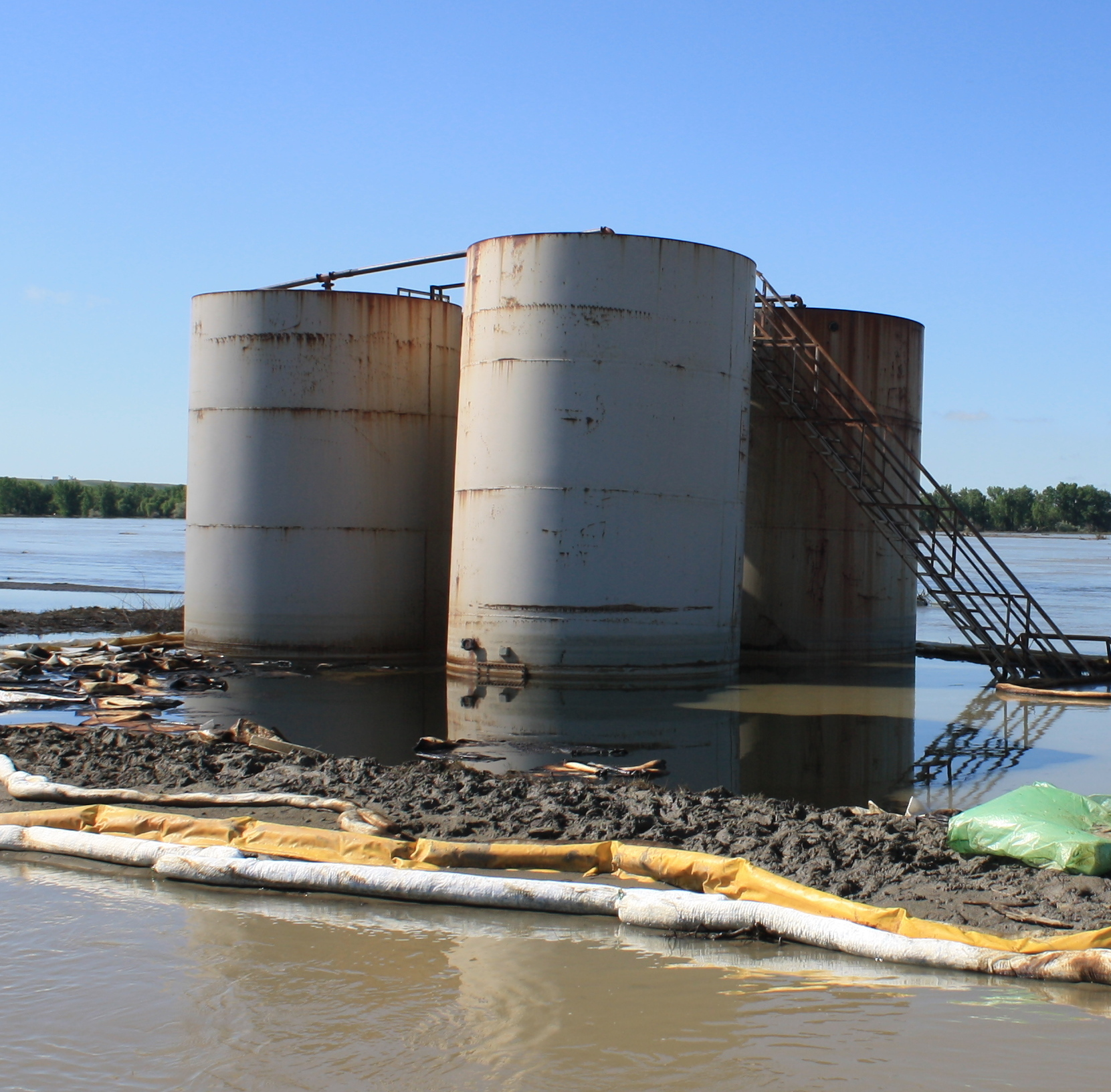
Oil spill from Missouri River flooding

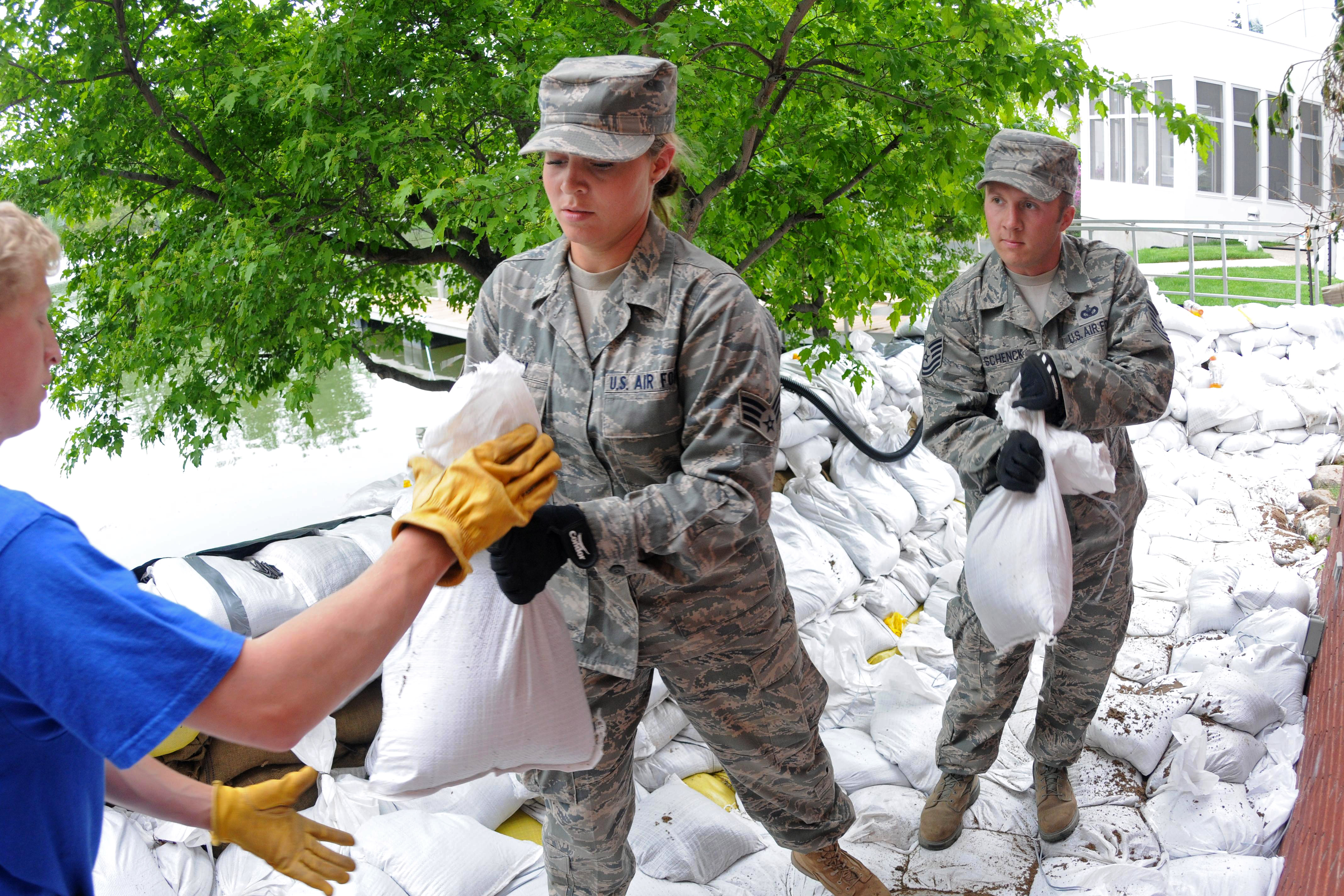
Flood defense construction, 2011

"Rising carbon dioxide concentrations are likely to increase the productivity of grasslands. Although ecosystems generally benefit from higher productivity, several impacts of a changing climate may harm ecosystems. Changes in temperature and the length of the growing season may disrupt natural ecological processes and shift species’ ranges.

Many species of birds are shifting northward as temperatures rise, and warmer temperatures are causing flowers in North Dakota to bloom earlier in spring. Even small changes in the timing of plant development or animal migration can disrupt predator-prey relationships, mating behavior, or availability of food".
