= Powers Lake, North Dakota =

- City
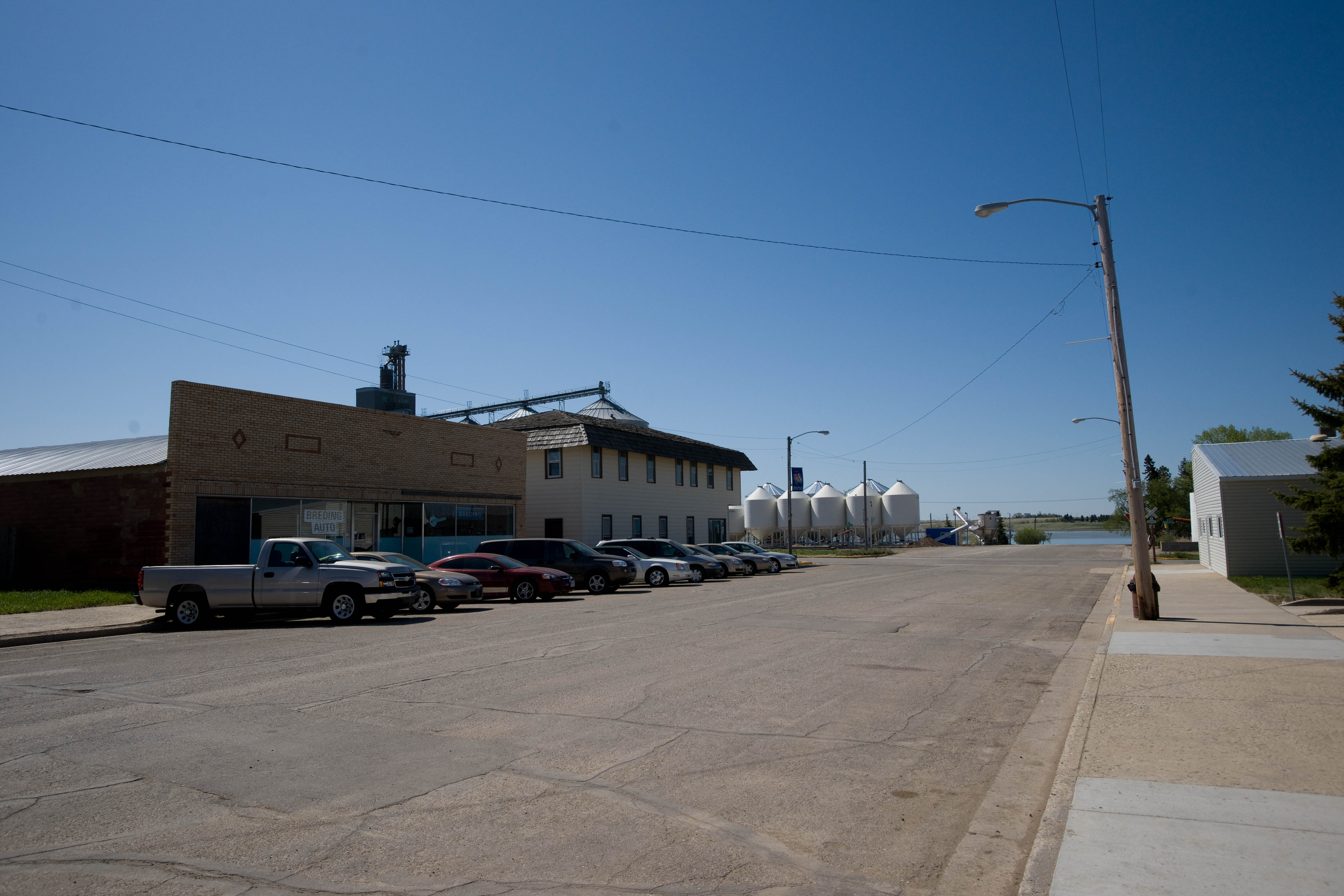
- Historic Hygge Hotel on Main Street

- Seal

- Location of Powers Lake, North Dakota
- Coordinates: 48°33′51″N 102°38′44″W
- Country: United States
- State: North Dakota
- County: Burke
- Founded: 1909

Area
  - Total: 1.64 sq mi (4.24 km^{2})
  - Land: 1.39 sq mi (3.60 km^{2})
  - Water: 0.25 sq mi (0.64 km^{2})
- Elevation: 2,224 ft (678 m)

Population (2020)
  - Total: 385
  - Estimate (2022): 376
  - Density: 277.0/sq mi (106.95/km^{2})
- Time zone: UTC-6 (Central (CST))
  - Summer (DST): UTC-5 (CDT)
- ZIP code: 58773
- Area code: 701
- FIPS code: 38-64140
- GNIS feature ID: 1036228
- Website: www.powerslakend.com

Powers Lake is a city in Burke County, North Dakota, United States. The population was 385 at the 2020 census.

== History ==
Sometime in the early 1890s, John J. Power and his family moved up the White Earth Valley and set up sheepfolds and a homestead on the South shore of a large lake. He maintained his ranch here for several years. In 1892 their daughter Margaret was born. Shortly thereafter, the Power family left the area, while Powers Lake remained.

The original town was founded in September 1909 and platted in October 1909 on the North shore of Powers Lake in southeastern Colville Township. The City of Powers Lake began because a Great Northern Railway (GN) branch line was being extended past the site and further into Burke County toward the border with Canada, one of a number of GN branch lines meant to cross the border with Canada. Powers Lake was originally part of "Imperial" Ward County as Burke County did not come into existence until 15 July 1910.

Before 1914, an additional five dozen lots and a potential school green were platted north of 4th Avenue by Mr. Peterson from his land on each side of Ward Road (now Peterson Road) in Colville Township.

The railroad purchased large swaths of land directly from the federal government, then sold acres of land to individual farmers, mainly immigrants from Scandinavia and Germany, with the expectation that GN would be their low-cost route to transport their output to major markets. The grain elevator at Powers Lake remains beside the old right-of-way to this day.

North Dakota Highway 50, located on the northeast side of the city, provides the main transport connection for most merchants and residents.

== Geography ==
According to the United States Census Bureau, the city has a total area of 1.24 square miles (3.21 km^{2}), of which 0.99 square miles (2.56 km^{2}) is land and 0.25 square miles (0.65 km^{2}) is water.

== Demographics ==
Historical population
Census	Pop.	Note	%±
1920	251		—
1930	382		52.2%
1940	464		21.5%
1950	565		21.8%
1960	633		12.0%
1970	523		−17.4%
1980	466		−10.9%
1990	408		−12.4%
2000	309		−24.3%
2010	280		−9.4%
2020	385		37.5%
2022 (est.)	376		−2.3%
U.S. Decennial Census; 2020 Census

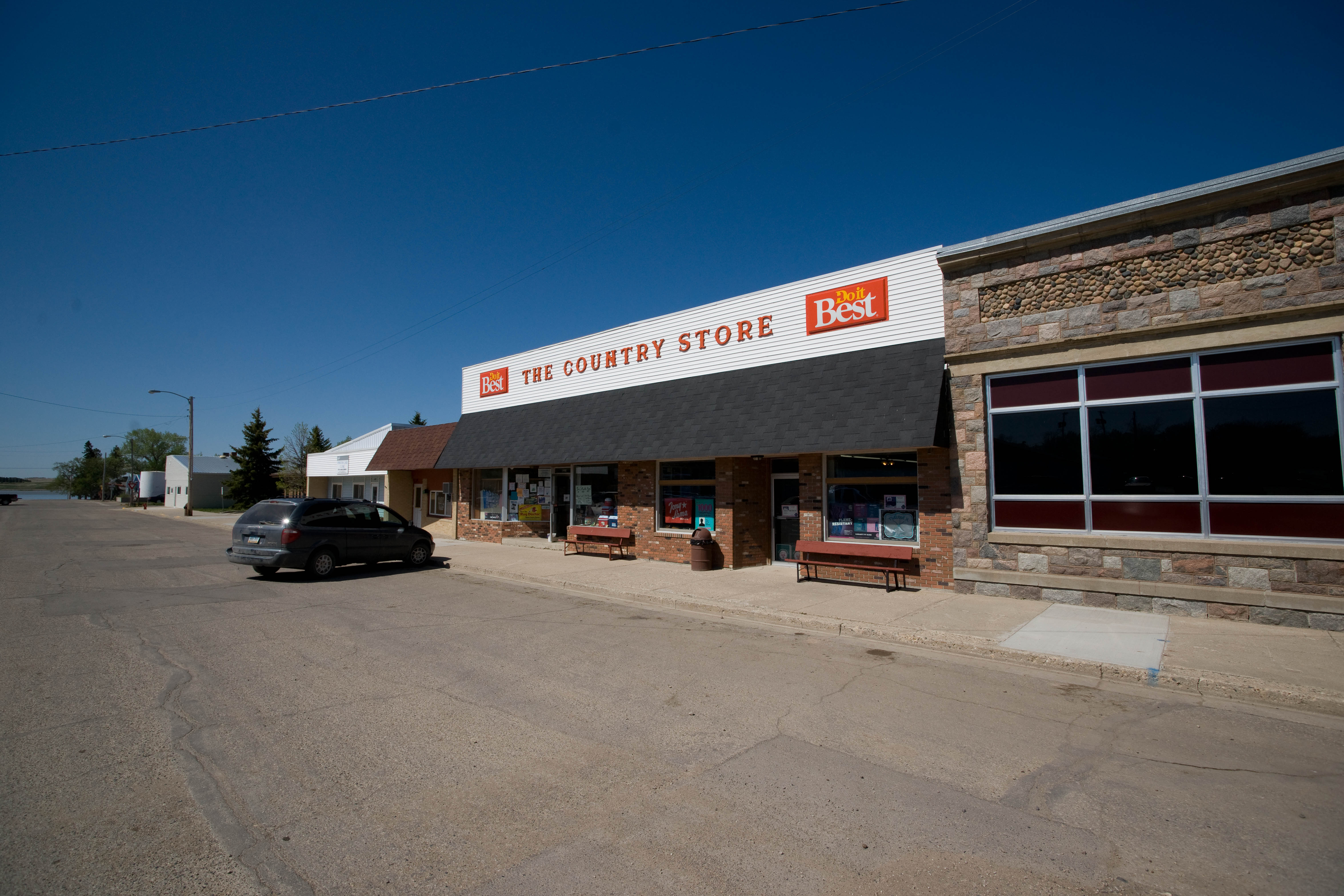
Country Store in Powers Lake

=== 2010 census ===
As of the census of 2010, there were 280 people, 137 households, and 76 families residing in the city. The population density was 283 inhabitants per square mile (109.3/km^{2}). There were 172 housing units at an average density of 174 per square mile (67.2/km^{2}). The racial makeup of the city was 98.2% White, 1.1% Native American, 0.4% Asian, and 0.4% from two or more races. Hispanic or Latino of any race were 1.1% of the population.

There were 137 households, of which 17.5% had children under the age of 18 living with them, 44.5% were married couples living together, 8.0% had a female householder with no husband present, 2.9% had a male householder with no wife present, and 44.5% were non-families. 41.6% of all households were made up of individuals, and 24.1% had someone living alone who was 65 years of age or older. The average household size was 2.04 and the average family size was 2.76.

The median age in the city was 47.5 years. 18.9% of residents were under the age of 18; 7.6% were between the ages of 18 and 24; 20% were from 25 to 44; 28.1% were from 45 to 64; and 25.4% were 65 years of age or older. The gender makeup of the city was 47.5% male and 52.5% female.

=== 2000 census ===
As of the census of 2000, there were 309 people, 148 households, and 84 families residing in the city. The population density was 312 inhabitants per square mile (120/km^{2}). There were 183 housing units at an average density of 185 per square mile (71/km^{2}). The racial makeup of the city was 97.73% White, 0.32% Native American, 0.32% Asian, 0.32% from other races, and 1.29% from two or more races. Hispanic or Latino of any race were 0.97% of the population.

There were 148 households, out of which 20.9% had children under the age of 18 living with them, 48.0% were married couples living together, 6.8% had a female householder with no husband present, and 42.6% were non-families. 41.9% of all households were made up of individuals, and 29.1% had someone living alone who was 65 years of age or older. The average household size was 2.08 and the average family size was 2.87.

In the city, the population was spread out, with 21.4% under the age of 18, 3.6% from 18 to 24, 23.0% from 25 to 44, 17.5% from 45 to 64, and 34.6% who were 65 years of age or older. The median age was 47 years. For every 100 females, there were 82.8 males. For every 100 females age 18 and over, there were 91.3 males.

The median income for a household in the city was $27,143, and the median income for a family was $36,389. Males had a median income of $30,000 versus $21,875 for females. The per capita income for the city was $14,894. About 3.2% of families and 9.0% of the population were below the poverty line, including none of those under the age of eighteen and 20.2% of those 65 or over.

== Climate ==
This climatic region is typified by large seasonal temperature differences, with warm to hot (and often humid) summers and cold (sometimes severely cold) winters. According to the Köppen Climate Classification system, Powers Lake has a humid continental climate, abbreviated "Dfb" on climate maps.

Climate data for Powers Lake 1N, North Dakota, 1991–2020 normals, 1925-2020 extremes: 2205ft (672m)
Month	Jan	Feb	Mar	Apr	May	Jun	Jul	Aug	Sep	Oct	Nov	Dec	Year
Record high °F (°C)	59 (15)	61 (16)	76 (24)	94 (34)	102 (39)	106 (41)	108 (42)	103 (39)	101 (38)	92 (33)	76 (24)	55 (13)	108 (42)
Mean maximum °F (°C)	40.0 (4.4)	44.0 (6.7)	59.2 (15.1)	78.4 (25.8)	87.1 (30.6)	90.4 (32.4)	94.4 (34.7)	95.4 (35.2)	89.4 (31.9)	78.2 (25.7)	56.2 (13.4)	42.0 (5.6)	97.8 (36.6)
Mean daily maximum °F (°C)	17.6 (−8.0)	21.2 (−6.0)	33.8 (1.0)	51.7 (10.9)	65.3 (18.5)	73.4 (23.0)	79.7 (26.5)	79.5 (26.4)	68.6 (20.3)	52.2 (11.2)	34.7 (1.5)	21.8 (−5.7)	50.0 (10.0)
Daily mean °F (°C)	7.3 (−13.7)	10.7 (−11.8)	23.7 (−4.6)	39.1 (3.9)	52.2 (11.2)	61.2 (16.2)	67.2 (19.6)	65.5 (18.6)	54.6 (12.6)	39.9 (4.4)	24.5 (−4.2)	12.0 (−11.1)	38.2 (3.4)
Mean daily minimum °F (°C)	−3.0 (−19.4)	0.2 (−17.7)	13.7 (−10.2)	26.5 (−3.1)	39.1 (3.9)	49.0 (9.4)	54.8 (12.7)	51.5 (10.8)	40.7 (4.8)	27.5 (−2.5)	14.3 (−9.8)	2.2 (−16.6)	26.4 (−3.1)
Mean minimum °F (°C)	−29.8 (−34.3)	−23.1 (−30.6)	−11.5 (−24.2)	10.0 (−12.2)	23.4 (−4.8)	36.0 (2.2)	42.2 (5.7)	37.8 (3.2)	23.9 (−4.5)	7.4 (−13.7)	−6.8 (−21.6)	−24.8 (−31.6)	−33.7 (−36.5)
Record low °F (°C)	−44 (−42)	−55 (−48)	−40 (−40)	−24 (−31)	11 (−12)	26 (−3)	28 (−2)	25 (−4)	14 (−10)	−9 (−23)	−30 (−34)	−48 (−44)	−55 (−48)
Average precipitation inches (mm)	0.44 (11)	0.29 (7.4)	0.58 (15)	0.90 (23)	2.18 (55)	2.70 (69)	3.07 (78)	1.73 (44)	1.35 (34)	1.16 (29)	0.48 (12)	0.44 (11)	15.32 (388.4)
Average snowfall inches (cm)	6.8 (17)	2.9 (7.4)	5.1 (13)	2.9 (7.4)	0.7 (1.8)	0.0 (0.0)	0.0 (0.0)	0.0 (0.0)	0.4 (1.0)	2.5 (6.4)	5.0 (13)	4.6 (12)	30.9 (79)
Source 1: NOAA (1981-2010 precip & snowfall)
Source 2: XMACIS (temp records & 1981-2010 monthly max/mins)

== See also ==
- Shrine of Our Lady of the Prairies

== Gallery ==
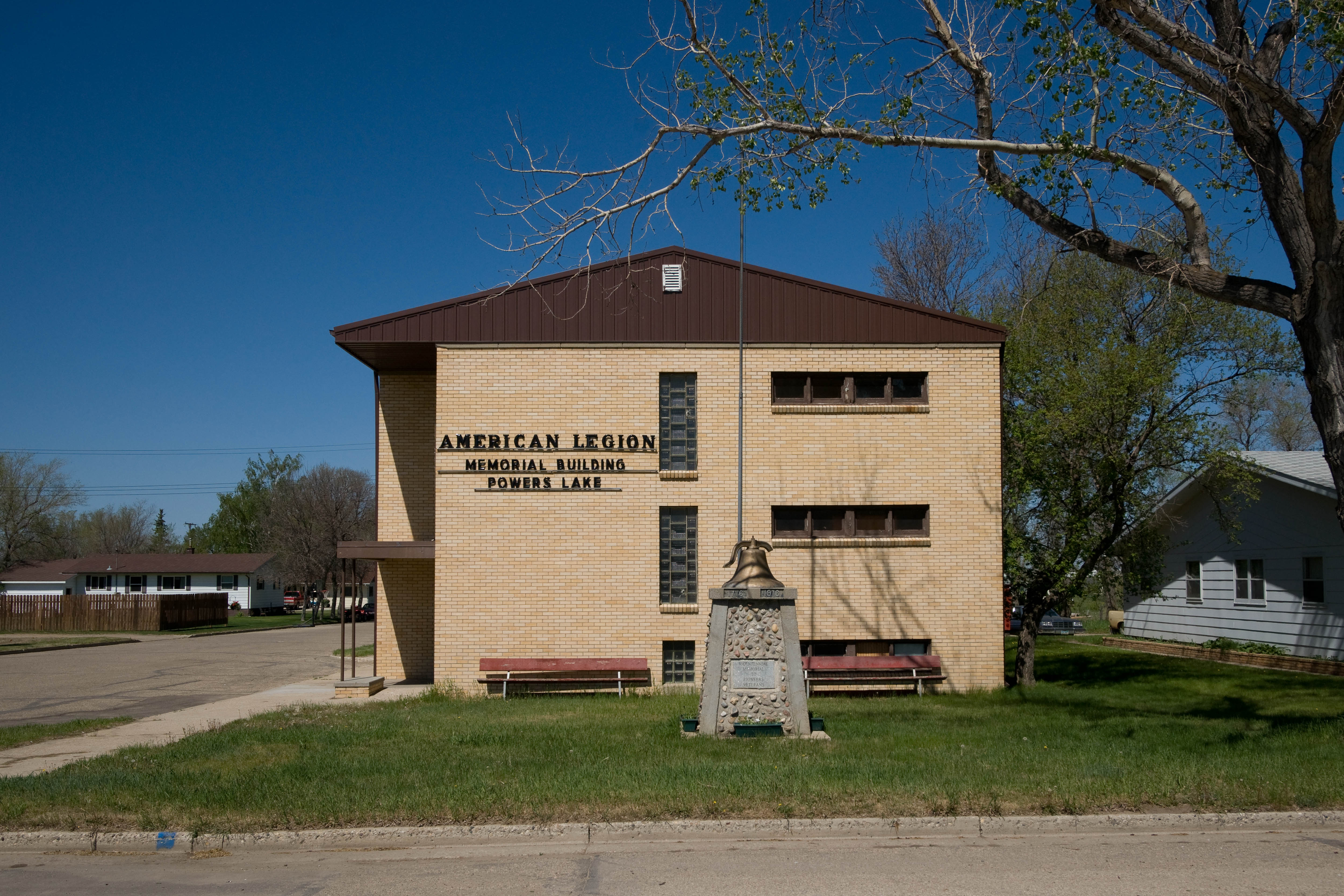
American Legion Building in Powers Lake

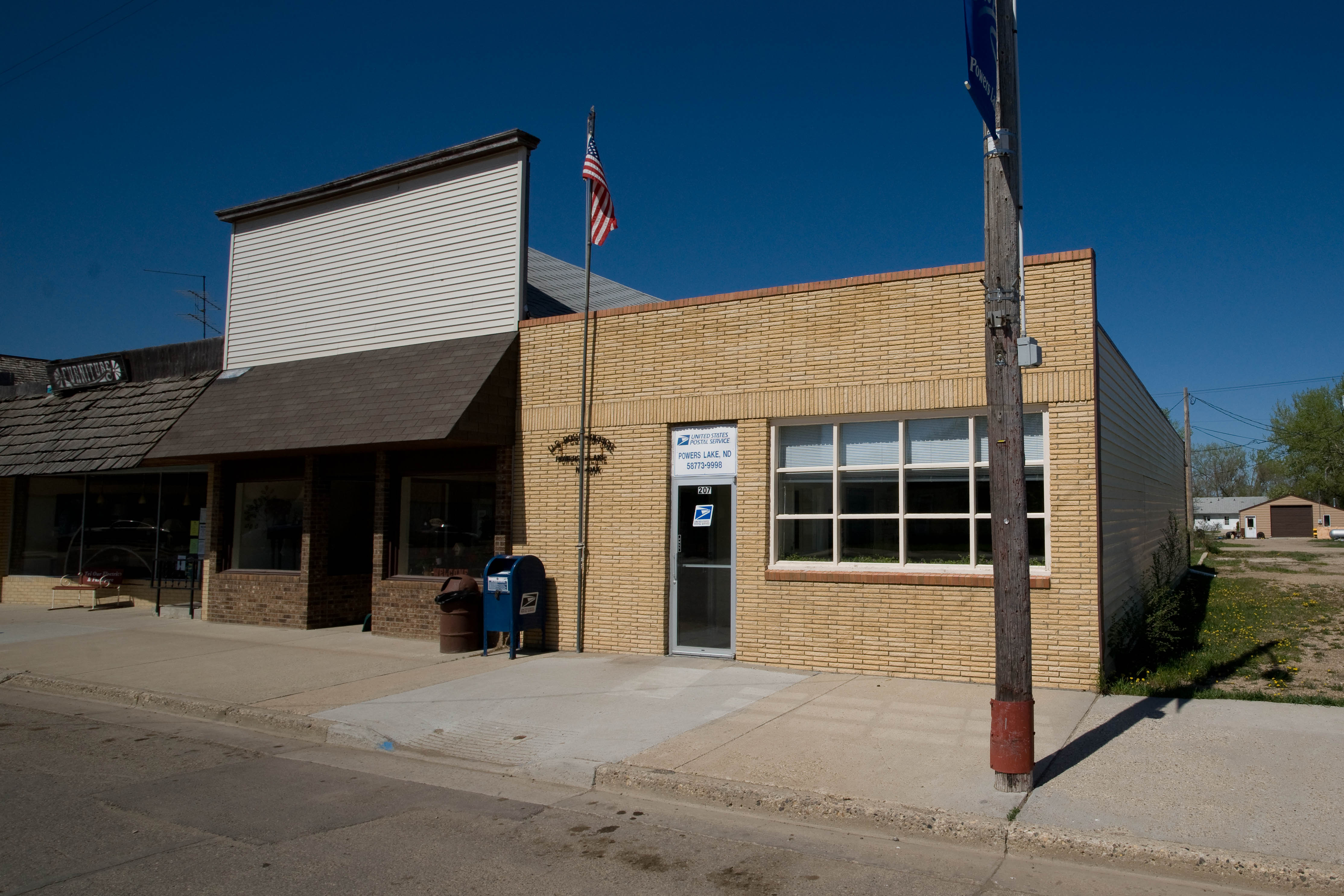
Post Office

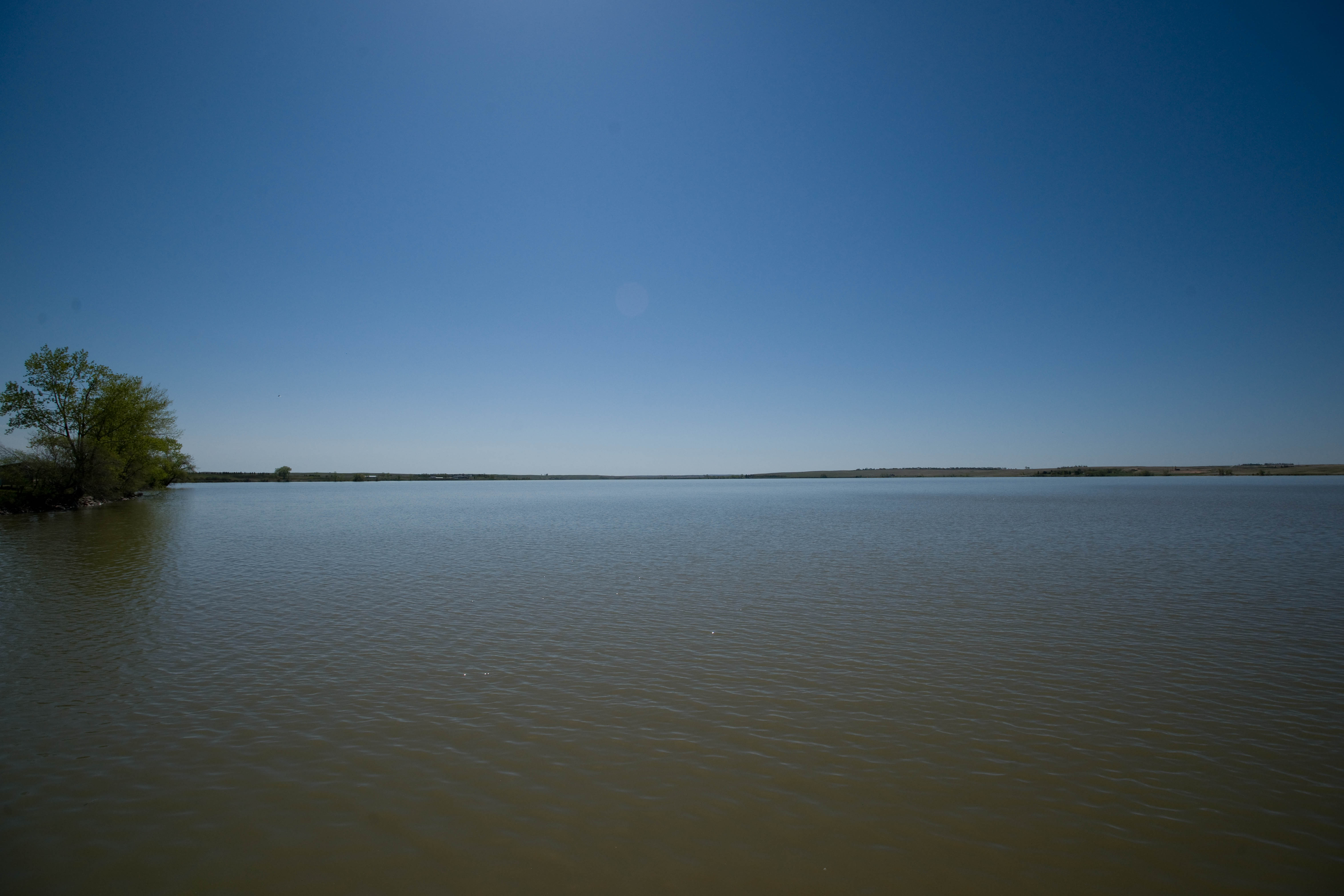
Lake Powers

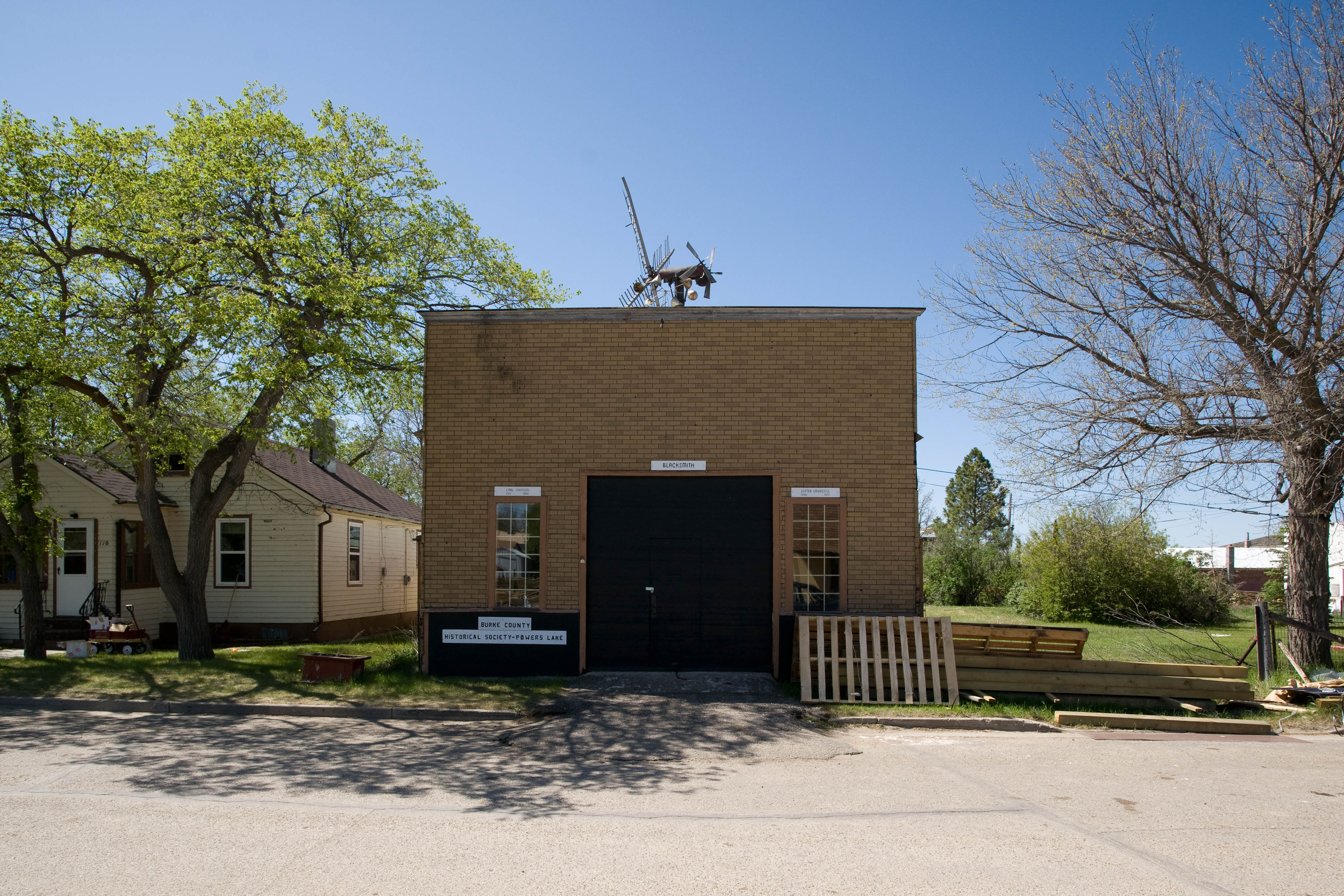
Burke County Historical Society

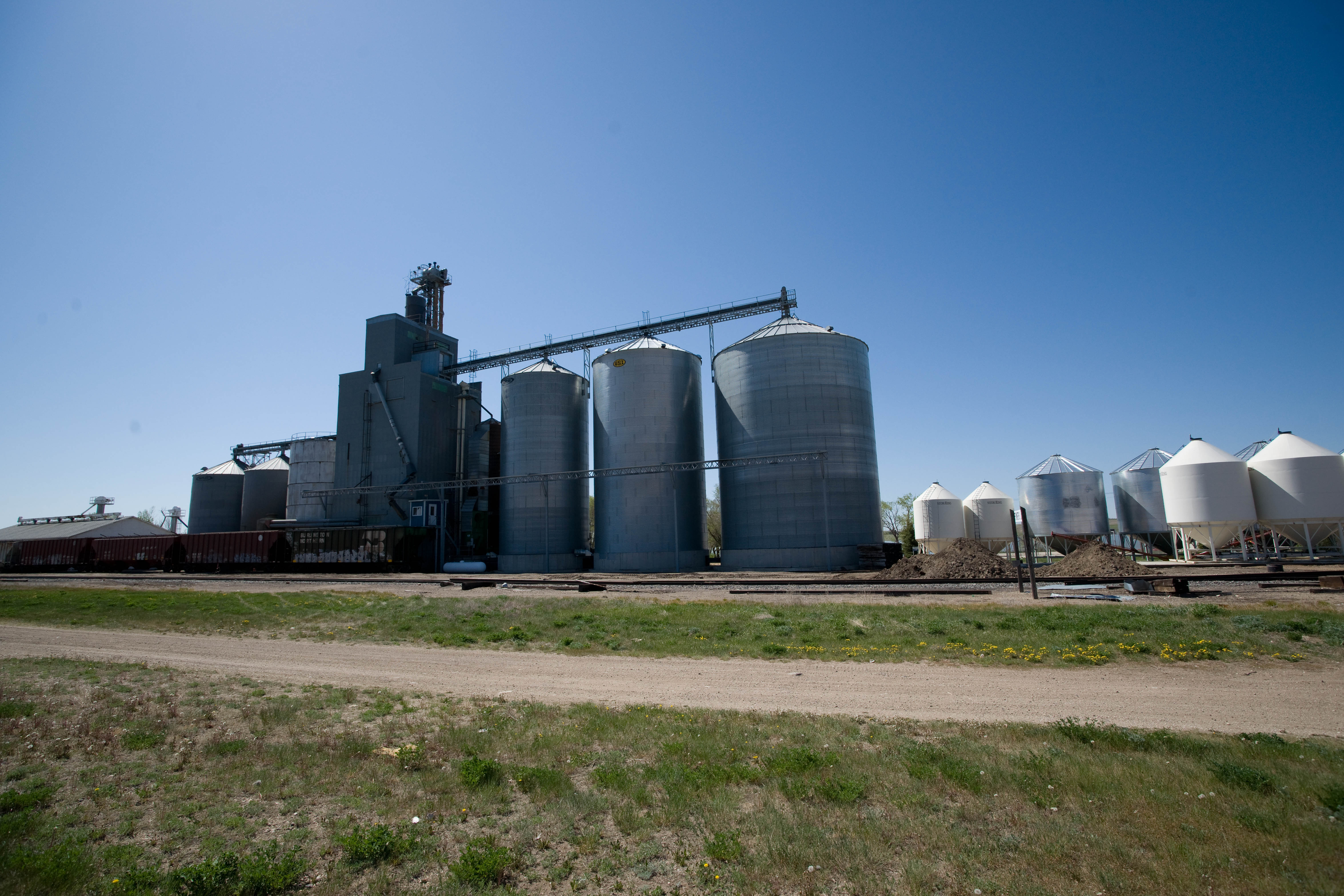
Grain elevator
