= Bowbells, North Dakota =

- City
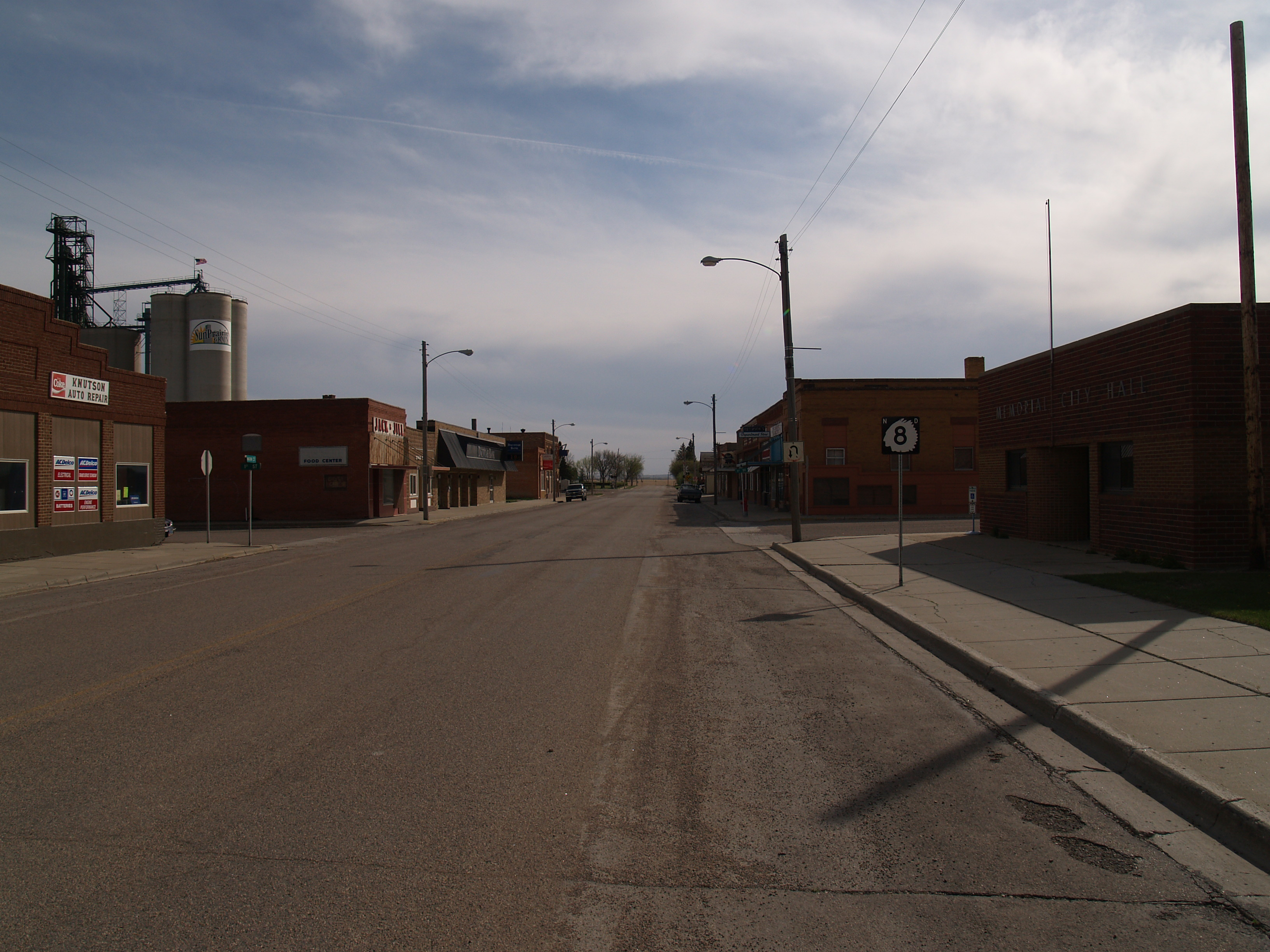
- Business district of Bowbells

- Location of Bowbells, North Dakota

- Location in the United States
- Coordinates: 48°48′10″N 102°14′44″W
- Country: United States
- State: North Dakota
- County: Burke
- Founded: 1898
- Incorporated: 1906

Area
  - Total: 0.97 sq mi (2.52 km^{2})
  - Land: 0.95 sq mi (2.46 km^{2})
  - Water: 0.019 sq mi (0.05 km^{2})
- Elevation: 1,962 ft (598 m)

Population (2020)
  - Total: 301
  - Estimate (2022): 286
  - Density: 316.6/sq mi (122.24/km^{2})
- Time zone: UTC-6 (Central (CST))
  - Summer (DST): UTC-5 (CDT)
- ZIP code: 58721
- Area code: 701
- FIPS code: 38-08500
- GNIS feature ID: 1035937
- Website: bowbellsnd.com

Bowbells is a city in and the county seat of Burke County, North Dakota, United States. The population was 301 at the 2020 census.

== History ==
The city of Bowbells was founded in 1898 along the main line of the Soo Line Railroad and incorporated in 1906. The city was named by railroad officials after the famed Bow bells at St Mary-le-Bow in London, England. The Soo Line is now operated by Canadian Pacific Railway and runs diagonally from the southeast to the northwest heading toward Portal, North Dakota, where the railroad crosses into Saskatchewan. The Great Northern Railway built a branchline in the early 1900s on the east side of the city that runs south-north toward Northgate, North Dakota and Northgate, Saskatchewan that became a secondary mainline, currently operated by Canadian National Railway over trackage originally owned by BNSF.

The city's centennial celebration was held in the third week in July 2006. Several hundred people from all over the country registered and attended. Burke County celebrated its centennial in the summer of 2010.

== Culture ==
The town is home to a Lutheran, a Methodist, and a Roman Catholic church.

A municipal golf course is located four miles east of the city, and a community swimming pool, park and campground are available as well for visitors and residents.

Bowbells' schoolhouse, built in 1909 at a cost of $15,000, is still in use. Due to attentive management over the years, the brick building is still in good condition and currently houses kindergarten through twelfth grade students. The building has a jerkinhead roof, combining gable and hipped roof types.

== Economy ==
Farmers in the area produce crops such as barley, canola, flax, oats, peas, sunflowers, durum and Hard Red Spring Wheat. There have been substantial oil wells in the area and thus oil-related businesses, including drilling, service and distribution businesses.

Some of the businesses in the town include an implement dealership, SunPrairie Grain (a division of CHS Incorporated), Savage Industries, and government-related buildings and businesses. The town's main street includes a gas station, a service station, a handful of crop and property insurance agencies, Dacotah Bank, Bowbells Hotel, and North Dakota Wine Kitchen. Since Bowbells is the county seat of Burke County, the county courthouse is located here. It's on the southwest side of town. The official county newspaper, The Burke County Tribune newspaper, is located in the city as well.

Montana-Dakota Utilities provides electrical service to the town. There is no municipal natural gas service.

== Geography ==
Bowbells is located a few miles west of Upper Des Lacs Lake and the Des Lacs National Wildlife Refuge. The Des Lacs valley was formed as meltwater flowed out of Glacial Lake Regina thousands of years ago.

Bowbells is about 20 km (12 mi) south of the Canada–US border, just off a 90-degree bend in U.S. Highway 52 and along the Canadian Pacific Railway, a railway serving the SunPrairie Grain grain terminal there. It is located approximately 52 miles northwest of Minot, the nearest city with an international airport (MOT) and 30 miles north of Stanley, the nearest passenger train station.

According to the United States Census Bureau, the city has a total area of 0.81 square miles (2.10 km^{2}), of which 0.80 square miles (2.07 km^{2}) is land and 0.01 square miles (0.03 km^{2}) is water.

== Demographics ==
Historical population
Census	Pop.	Note	%±
1910	651		—
1920	643		−1.2%
1930	695		8.1%
1940	787		13.2%
1950	806		2.4%
1960	687		−14.8%
1970	584		−15.0%
1980	587		0.5%
1990	498		−15.2%
2000	406		−18.5%
2010	336		−17.2%
2020	301		−10.4%
2022 (est.)	286		−5.0%
U.S. Decennial Census; 2020 Census

=== 2010 census ===
As of the census of 2010, there were 336 people, 161 households, and 93 families residing in the city. The population density was 420.0 inhabitants per square mile (162.2/km^{2}). There were 223 housing units at an average density of 278.8 per square mile (107.6/km^{2}). The racial makeup of the city was 96.4% White, 0.6% Native American, 2.7% Asian, and 0.3% from two or more races. Hispanic or Latino of any race were 0.6% of the population.

There were 161 households, of which 24.2% had children under the age of 18 living with them, 46.6% were married couples living together, 7.5% had a female householder with no husband present, 3.7% had a male householder with no wife present, and 42.2% were non-families. 36.0% of all households were made up of individuals, and 16.2% had someone living alone who was 65 years of age or older. The average household size was 2.09 and the average family size was 2.70.

The median age in the city was 47.7 years. 21.4% of residents were under the age of 18; 6.7% were between the ages of 18 and 24; 18.3% were from 25 to 44; 34.7% were from 45 to 64; and 19% were 65 years of age or older. The gender makeup of the city was 52.4% male and 47.6% female.

=== 2000 census ===
As of the census of 2000, there were 406 people, 174 households, and 116 families residing in the town. The population density was 511.2 inhabitants per square mile (197.4/km^{2}). There were 214 housing units at an average density of 269.5 per square mile (104.1/km^{2}). The racial makeup of the town was 98.77% White, 0.74% Native American, 0.25% Asian, and 0.25% from two or more races. Hispanic or Latino of any race were 0.25% of the population.

There were 174 households, out of which 31.6% had children under the age of 18 living with them, 55.7% were married couples living together, 7.5% had a female householder with no husband present, and 33.3% were non-families. 32.2% of all households were made up of individuals, and 19.5% had someone living alone who was 65 years of age or older. The average household size was 2.33 and the average family size was 2.97.

In the town the population was spread out, with 27.3% under the age of 18, 3.7% from 18 to 24, 24.9% from 25 to 44, 23.2% from 45 to 64, and 20.9% who were 65 years of age or older. About 100 K-12 students attend the town's local public school. The median age was 42 years. For every 100 females, there were 91.5 males. For every 100 females age 18 and over, there were 90.3 males.

The median income for a household in the town was $30,455, and the median income for a family was $35,625. Males had a median income of $30,833 versus $12,212 for females. The per capita income for the town was $15,491. About 9.2% of families and 8.6% of the population were below the poverty line, including 8.1% of those under age 18 and 5.9% of those age 65 or over.

== Notable people ==
- Les Jepsen, former NBA and University of Iowa basketball player, born and raised in Bowbells
- Francis D. Lyon, Hollywood director and Academy Award-winning film editor, born in Bowbells

== Climate ==
This climatic region is typified by large seasonal temperature differences, with warm to hot (and often humid) summers and cold (sometimes severely cold) winters. According to the Köppen Climate Classification system, Bowbells has a humid continental climate, abbreviated "Dfb" on climate maps.

== See also ==
- Northgate Border Crossing
