= Columbus, North Dakota =

Columbus
- City
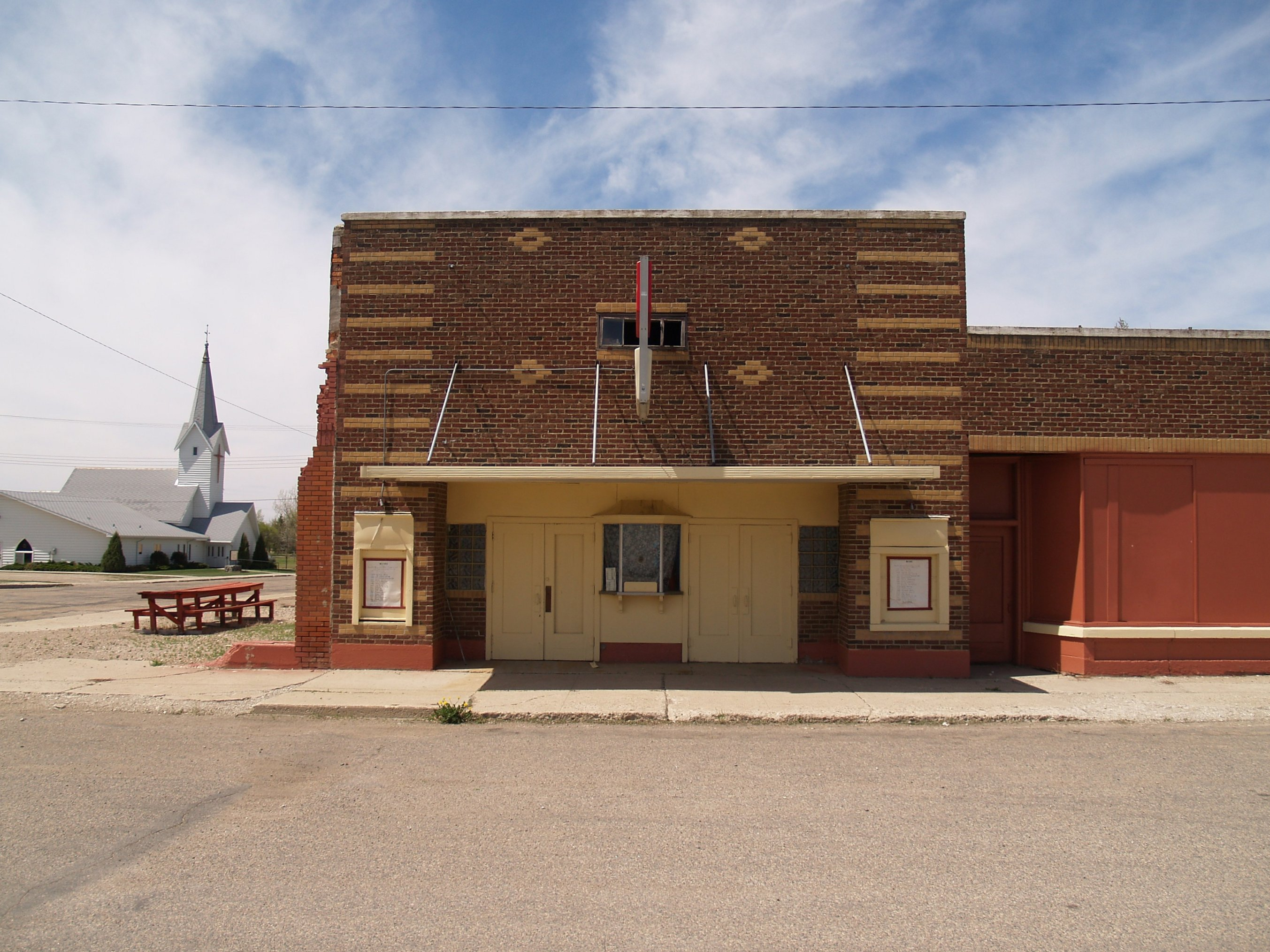

- Location of Columbus, North Dakota
- Coordinates: 48°54′18″N 102°46′52″W
- Country: United States
- State: North Dakota
- County: Burke
- Founded: 1906

Area
  - Total: 0.27 sq mi (0.71 km^{2})
  - Land: 0.27 sq mi (0.71 km^{2})
  - Water: 0 sq mi (0.00 km^{2})
- Elevation: 1,932 ft (589 m)

Population (2020)
  - Total: 139
  - Estimate (2022): 132
  - Density: 509.9/sq mi (196.86/km^{2})
- Time zone: UTC-6 (Central (CST))
  - Summer (DST): UTC-5 (CDT)
- ZIP code: 58727
- Area code: 701
- FIPS code: 38-15460
- GNIS feature ID: 1035976
- Website: cityofcolumbusnd.com

Columbus is a city in Burke County, North Dakota, United States. The population was 139 at the 2020 census. Columbus was founded in 1906. Both this town and nearby Larson were named for an early postmaster who served the area (Columbus Larson), making it possibly the only town so named that was not named for Christopher Columbus.

== Geography ==
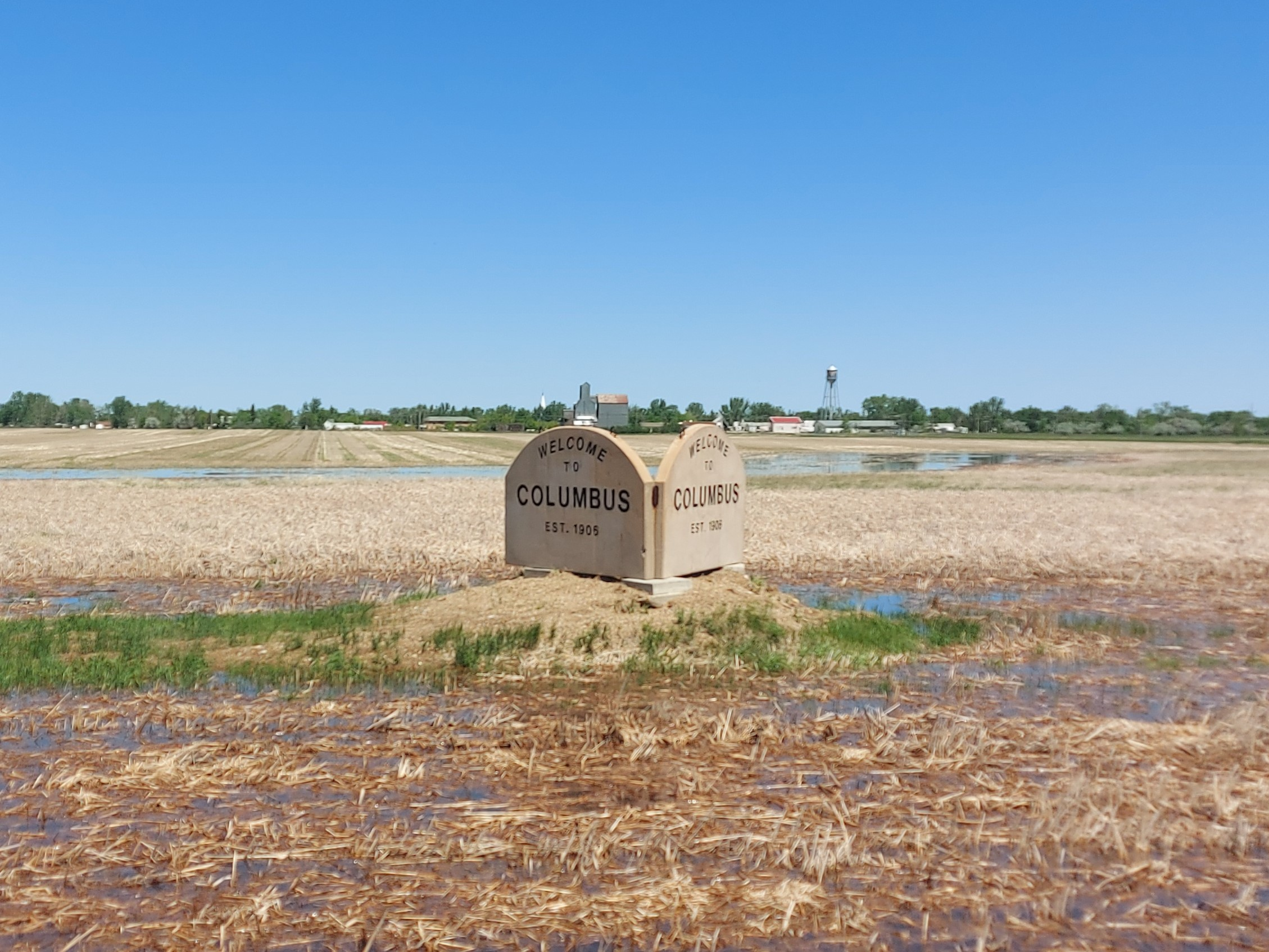
Columbus, Nd as seen from Highway 5

According to the United States Census Bureau, the city has a total area of 0.27 square miles (0.70 km^{2}), all land. Columbus is the only city in Short Creek Township, located to the southwest in Section 32.

== Demographics ==
Historical population
Census	Pop.	Note	%±
1910	225		—
1920	332		47.6%
1930	516		55.4%
1940	506		−1.9%
1950	525		3.8%
1960	672		28.0%
1970	465		−30.8%
1980	325		−30.1%
1990	223		−31.4%
2000	151		−32.3%
2010	133		−11.9%
2020	139		4.5%
2022 (est.)	132		−5.0%
U.S. Decennial Census; 2020 Census

=== 2010 census ===
As of the census of 2010, there were 133 people, 65 households, and 44 families residing in the city. The population density was 492.6 inhabitants per square mile (190.2/km^{2}). There were 130 housing units at an average density of 481.5 per square mile (185.9/km^{2}). The racial makeup of the city was 95.5% White, 1.5% African American, 2.3% Asian, and 0.8% from two or more races.

There were 65 households, of which 23.1% had children under the age of 18 living with them, 55.4% were married couples living together, 9.2% had a female householder with no husband present, 3.1% had a male householder with no wife present, and 32.3% were non-families. 27.7% of all households were made up of individuals, and 12.3% had someone living alone who was 65 years of age or older. The average household size was 2.05 and the average family size was 2.45.

The median age in the city was 50.3 years. 18% of residents were under the age of 18; 5.4% were between the ages of 18 and 24; 16.6% were from 25 to 44; 34.6% were from 45 to 64; and 25.6% were 65 years of age or older. The gender makeup of the city was 49.6% male and 50.4% female.

=== 2000 census ===
As of the census of 2000, there were 151 people, 83 households, and 44 families residing in the city. The population density was 548.5 inhabitants per square mile (211.8/km^{2}). There were 142 housing units at an average density of 515.8 per square mile (199.2/km^{2}). The racial makeup of the city was 98.68% White, 0.66% African American and 0.66% Asian.

There were 83 households, out of which 12.0% had children under the age of 18 living with them, 45.8% were married couples living together, 7.2% had a female householder with no husband present, and 45.8% were non-families. 44.6% of all households were made up of individuals, and 30.1% had someone living alone who was 65 years of age or older. The average household size was 1.82 and the average family size was 2.49.

In the city, the population was spread out, with 10.6% under the age of 18, 2.0% from 18 to 24, 19.9% from 25 to 44, 32.5% from 45 to 64, and 35.1% who were 65 years of age or older. The median age was 57 years. For every 100 females, there were 101.3 males. For every 100 females age 18 and over, there were 104.5 males.

The median income for a household in the city was $17,679, and the median income for a family was $26,667. Males had a median income of $28,750 versus $23,750 for females. The per capita income for the city was $14,643. There were 6.3% of families and 12.5% of the population living below the poverty line, including no under eighteens and 21.9% of those over 64.

== Climate ==
This climatic region is typified by large seasonal temperature differences, with warm to hot (and often humid) summers and cold (sometimes severely cold) winters. According to the Köppen Climate Classification system, Columbus has a humid continental climate, abbreviated "Dfb" on climate maps.
