= Shrine of Our Lady of the Prairies =

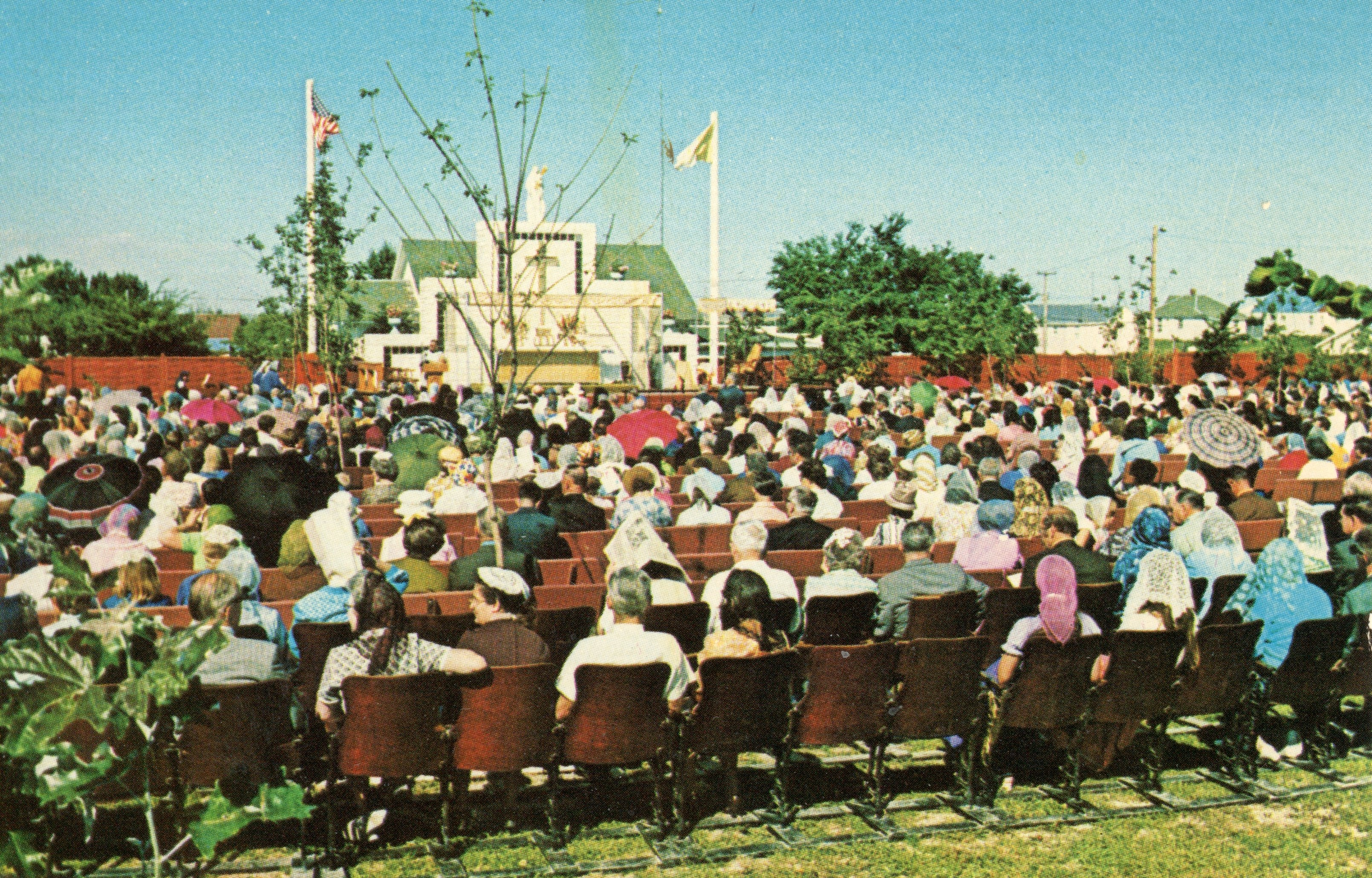
- Post card image taken in the 60s of attendees at the shrine at its height of popularity during an annual pilgrimage of 5,000 people.

- Location in North Dakota

Religion
- Affiliation: Christianity (unapproved Catholic shrine)
- Ecclesiastical or organisational status: Private shrine
- Patron: Our Lady of the Prairies

Location
- Location: North Dakota, United States
- Interactive map of Shrine of Our Lady of the Prairies
- Coordinates: 48°33′49.5″N 102°38′41″W

Architecture
- Founder: Reverend Fredric J. Nelson
- Established: 1955

The Shrine of Our Lady of the Prairies is a traditionalist Catholic shrine in Powers Lake, North Dakota. It was formally dedicated in 1955 by Reverend Fredric J. Nelson, who also published the Maryfaithful magazine. It is controversial as it is not considered part of the local Bismarck Catholic Diocese.

== History ==
==== 1955-1972 ====
In 1955 the Shrine of Our Lady of the Prairies was dedicated, and since then, annual pilgrimages had occurred. By 1956, pilgrimages to the shrine were reported with the Williston Herald writing that the shrine attracted thousands of pilgrims each years. The Ward County Independent reported in 1958 that the shrine was preparing to accommodate large crowds that were to be expected. The same report noted that 10,000 pilgrims visited in 1957.

Since 1960, Catholic activity had increased after the Missionaries of Our Lady of the Prairies which was composed of Sisters, Brothers, and Lay Oblates arrived at Powers Lake. The group at the time published The Maryfaithful, maintained the Marian Hour Radio Rosary Broadcast, sponsored the manufacture and recording of Catholic records under its own Marycord label, maintained a thrift shop, a print shop, and a religious goods shop.

In 1969, Grand Forks Herald reported a then mile long procession by the shrine led by hundreds of children, altar boys, first communications, and flower girls that walked through the streets of Powers Lake. It was highlighted that the blessing of the sick was the main motivation for many at the time to commence a pilgrimage to the site, with the ceremony as the same that could be found at the Catholic shrines of Lourdes and Fatima. The procession usually circled the entire city before the last pilgrims at the end of the line could start marching.

Additional reporting by the Morning Pioneer in 1969 noted that "thousands of Catholics from all over the U.S. and Canada descend annually on a small isolated Norwegian Protestant town..." The local church at the time only had 15 pews which forced church services outside. Hundreds of cures have been claimed at the shine.

In 1970, Father Nelson caused confusion among parishioners by failing to appear for Sunday mass, leading to a note on the church door declaring the parish "under interdict and closed until further notice." This incident followed Father Nelson's campaigns against local movie theaters, "adult-type films," and his efforts to reform community "morality" by opposing short skirts and uncovered heads, which led him to refuse mass to non-compliant parishioners.

The Bismarck diocese subsequently stated he had gone on "vacation to the West Coast," a claim not widely believed by the community, given the note signed with his initials, and is likely related to Father Nelson's "frustration" over uncovered heads leading to his sudden departure.

In 1972, the founder of the Society of Saint Pius X (SSPX), Archbishop Marcel Lafebvre visited the shrine and led the annual procession to the shrine after holding a pontifical high mass.

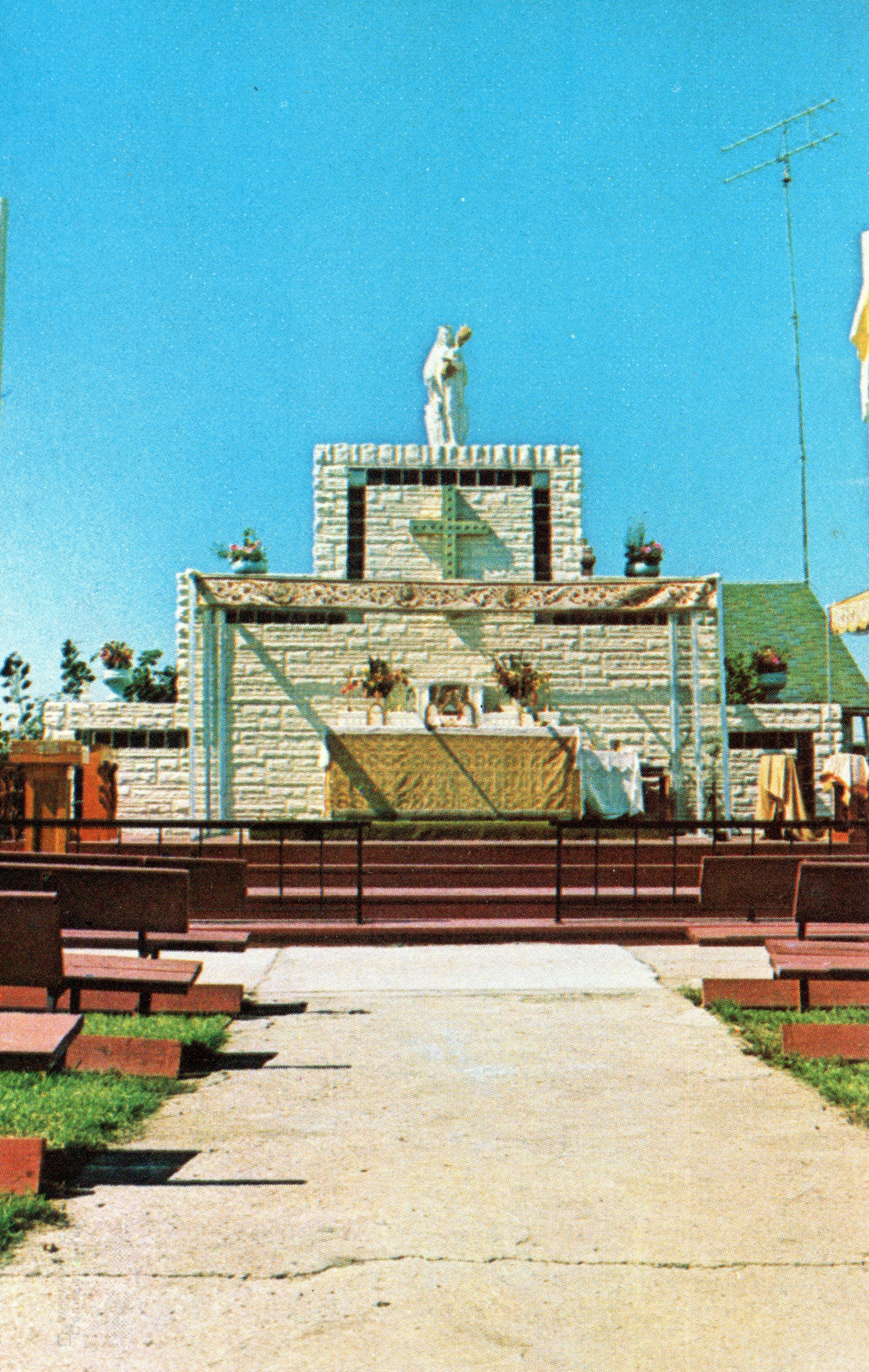
Photo of the altar of the shrine taken from a postcard

=== Involvement of Ryan St. Anne (Ryan Patrick Scott) ===
In early 2003, Ryan St. Anne Scott, also known as Ryan Patrick Scott, assumed the role of administrator at the Shrine of Our Lady of the Prairies. St. Anne, 51 at the time, presented himself as a "traditional Catholic priest" and abbot of an independent Benedictine monastery named Holy Rosary Abbey. He advocated for the Latin Mass and rejected post-Vatican II changes.

His arrival at the Shrine was facilitated by Roseanna Gevelinger, the Shrine's treasurer, who had met and admired him through traditional Catholic gatherings. The board, reportedly desperate for a priest, did not thoroughly investigate his past.

==== Lack of ecclesiastical recognition ====
Bishop Paul Zipfel of the Bismarck Catholic Diocese stated that he did not recognize St. Anne as a priest, and the shrine itself was not considered part of the diocese. The Diocese of Peoria other dioceses publicly warned Catholics that St. Anne was not a legitimate priest and that his sacraments and ceremonies were not sanctioned by the Church. Church officials in Dubuque, Iowa, where St. Anne claimed a retired Roman Catholic archbishop validated his ordination, stated that the archbishop was suffering from Alzheimer's disease at the time and had since died.

St. Ambrose University, where he claimed to have attended seminary, has no record of his attendance, and his marriage during that period would have disqualified him from priestly training.

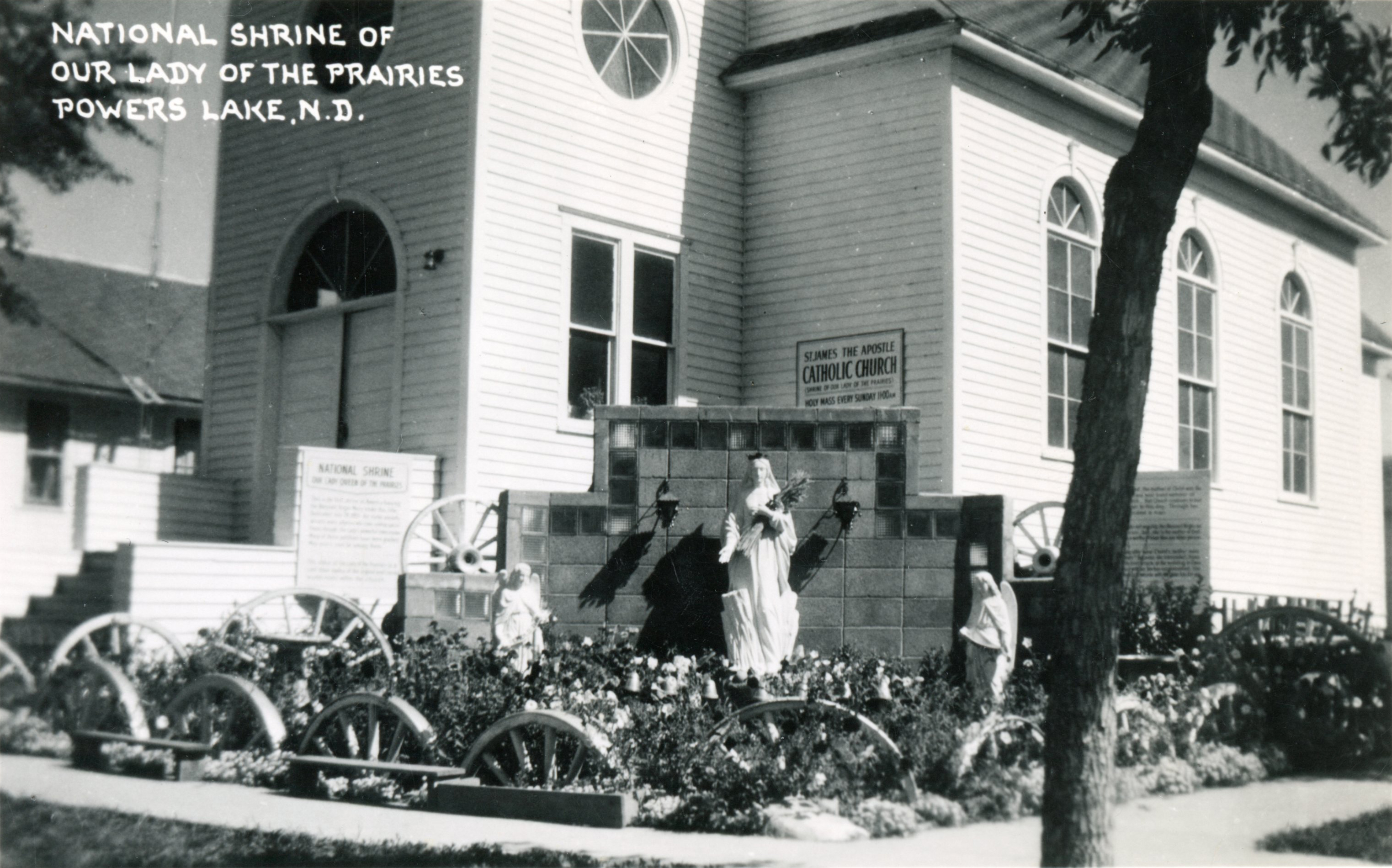
Photo of the shrine in a vintage postcard. Circa 1950s-1960s

==== Legal and financial disputes ====
St. Anne was involved in multiple legal conflicts. In April 2004, he and Roseanna Gevelinger obtained a restraining order against shrine board members Paul Dobrowski and Jerry Durick, alleging threats and intentions to destroy property and financial records. St. Anne also claimed the shrine was under investigation for finances prior to his arrival. The Shrine's board members accused St. Anne of inability to properly conduct Holy Week rituals and attempting to gain financial control of the Shrine and its assets. This led to a lawsuit from St. Anne seeking back pay and damages.

==== Departure from Powers Lake ====
St. Anne left Powers Lake in August 2004, at the request of the Shrine's board of directors. He moved to Galesburg, Illinois, where he intended to establish a new independent Benedictine monastery. Roseanna Gevelinger, then 82, and one other elderly former parishioner accompanied him.

After St. Anne's departure, the Shrine of Our Lady of the Prairies reportedly had "zero" parishioners, though the board of directors expressed a desire to find another "traditional Catholic priest" to offer the Latin Mass and continued broadcasting its radio program, "The Marian Hour."
