= Larson, North Dakota =

- Census-designated place & Unincorporated community
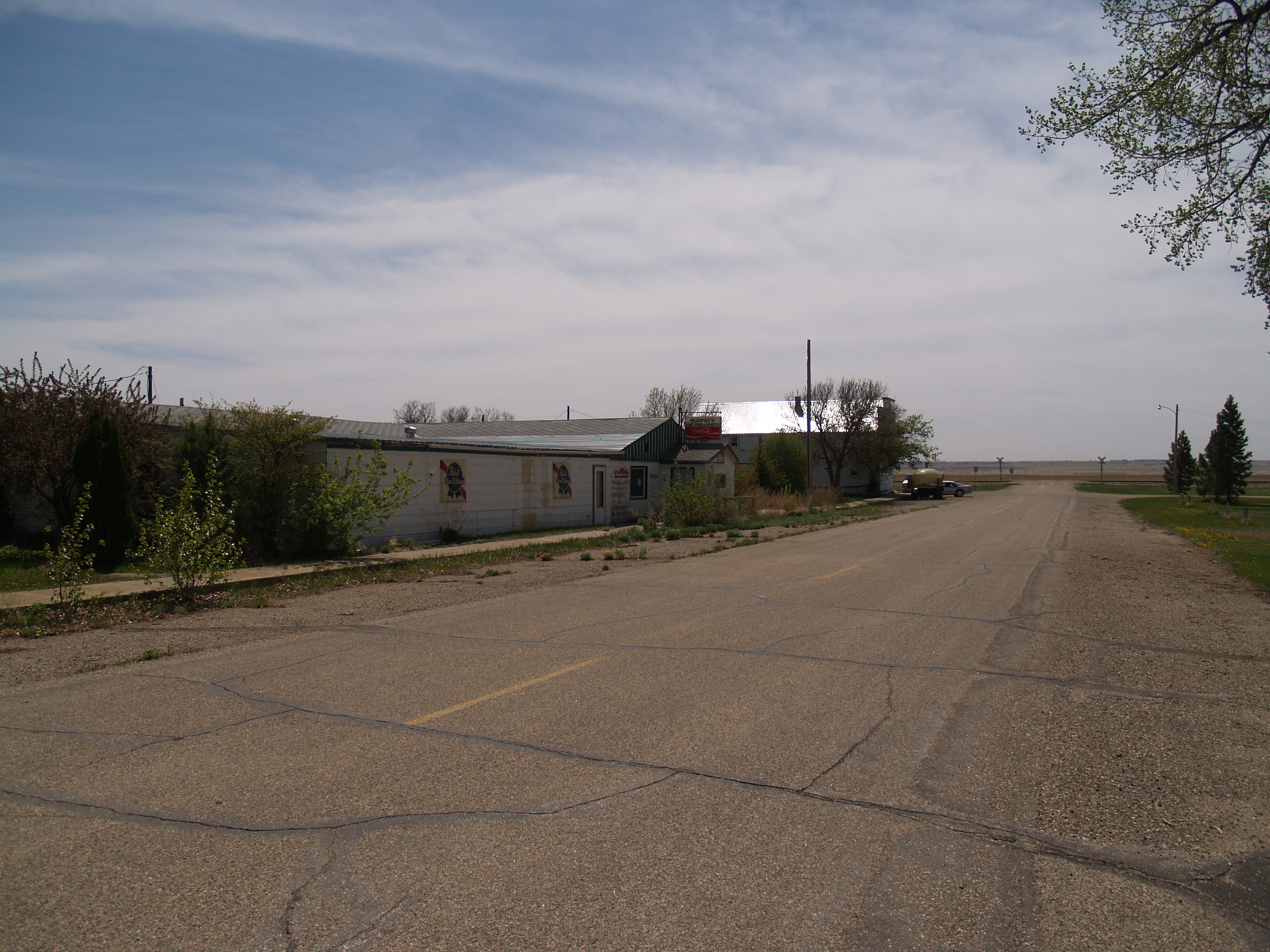
- Businesses in Larson

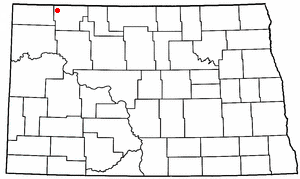
- Location of Larson, North Dakota
- Coordinates: 48°53′28″N 102°51′58″W
- Country: United States
- State: North Dakota
- County: Burke
- Township: Keller
- Founded: 1907
- Dissolved: 2003
- Named after: Columbus Larson

Area
  - Total: 0.41 sq mi (1.06 km^{2})
  - Land: 0.41 sq mi (1.06 km^{2})
  - Water: 0 sq mi (0.00 km^{2})
- Elevation: 1,926 ft (587 m)

Population (2020)
  - Total: 9
  - Density: 22/sq mi (8.5/km^{2})
- Time zone: UTC-6 (Central (CST))
  - Summer (DST): UTC-5 (CDT)
- ZIP code: 58727
- Area code: 701
- FIPS code: 38-45220
- GNIS feature ID: 1036121

Larson is a former city and current census-designated place in Burke County, North Dakota, United States. The population was 9 at the 2020 census.

== History ==
Larson was founded in 1907, located in the Northeast quarter of Section 3 in Keller Township. Both this town and nearby Columbus were named for Columbus Larson, an early postmaster who served the area. In 1914, located just south of the town, there were two grain elevators located on a siding of the Great Northern Railway. The early success of the community was due to its location along the railroad right-of-way providing goods and services to the settlers of Keller Township located east, south and west of town, and also settlers in Forthun Township located to the north. The town was especially important to farmers by providing cost-effective transportation of agricultural products to major markets. The Soo Line railroad ran an east-to-west beeline one-half mile north of the Keller-Forthun township border, but there were no elevators or other businesses along their right-of-way at the time.

The city government of Larson was dissolved in 2003. Even though it is now an unincorporated community, it was declared a census-designated place as part of the U.S. Census Bureau's Participant Statistical Areas Program on March 31, 2010. As a result, it was included in the 2010 census.

== Geography ==
According to the United States Census Bureau, the city has a total area of 0.4 square miles (1.0 km^{2}), all land.

== Demographics ==
Historical population
Census	Pop.	Note	%±
1920	114		—
1930	89		−21.9%
1940	79		−11.2%
1950	59		−25.3%
1960	62		5.1%
1970	35		−43.5%
1980	21		−40.0%
1990	26		23.8%
2000	17		−34.6%
2010	12		−29.4%
2020	9		−25.0%
U.S. Decennial Census

As of the census of 2000, there were 17 people, 8 households, and 7 families residing in the city. The population density was 38.3 inhabitants per square mile (14.8/km^{2}). There were 13 housing units at an average density of 29.3 per square mile (11.3/km^{2}). The racial makeup of the city was 100.00% White.

There were 8 households, out of which 25.0% had children under the age of 18 living with them, 75.0% were married couples living together, and 12.5% were non-families. 12.5% of all households were made up of individuals, and 12.5% had someone living alone who was 65 years of age or older. The average household size was 2.13 and the average family size was 2.29.

In the city the population was spread out, with 11.8% under the age of 18, 11.8% from 25 to 44, 23.5% from 45 to 64, and 52.9% who were 65 years of age or older. The median age was 72 years. For every 100 females, there were 142.9 males. For every 100 females age 18 and over, there were 114.3 males.

The median income for a household in the city was $10,000, and the median income for a family was $9,250. The 2000 Census reported none of the population was part of the year-round workforce, with the bulk of the population receiving Social Security income or some sort of public assistance. The per capita income for the city was $7,263. Below the poverty line were 56.7% of people, 61.5% of families, 100.0% of those under 18 and 27.8% of those over 64.
