= Lake Zahl National Wildlife Refuge =

Protected area in North Dakota, United States

- IUCN category IV (habitat/species management area)
- Location within the United States
- Location: Williams County, North Dakota, USA
- Nearest city: Crosby, ND
- Coordinates: 48°34′14″N 103°39′38″W
- Area: 3,823 acres (1,547 ha)
- Established: 1939
- Governing body: U.S. Fish and Wildlife Service

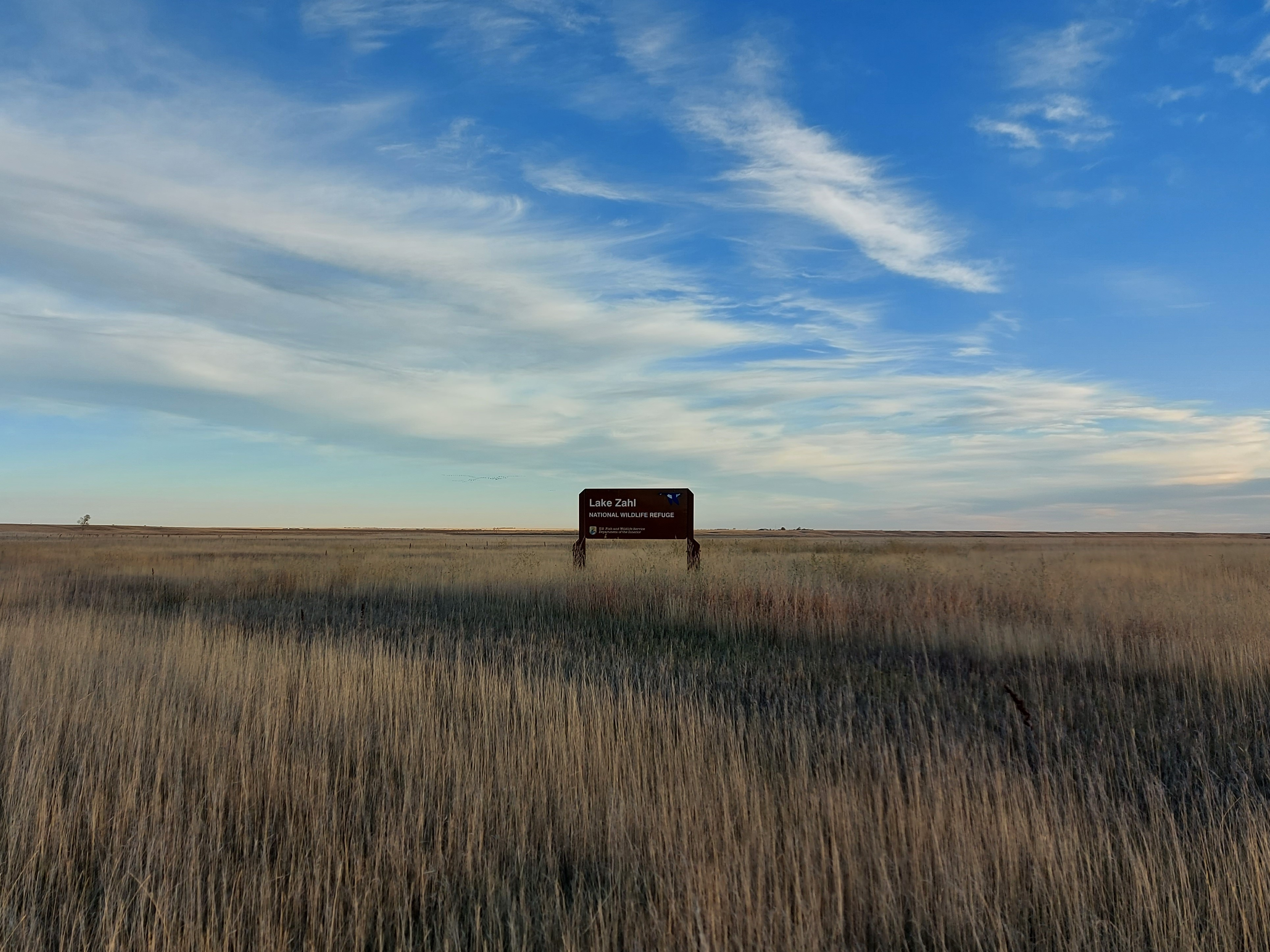
Lake Zahl NWR

Lake Zahl National Wildlife Refuge is a 3,823-acre (1,547 ha) National Wildlife Refuge in Williams County in the U.S. state of North Dakota. The refuge consists of Lake Zahl which provides habitat for many species of waterfowl and other species. It is managed by the Crosby Wetland Management District.
