= Burke County, North Dakota =

County in North Dakota, United States

- County
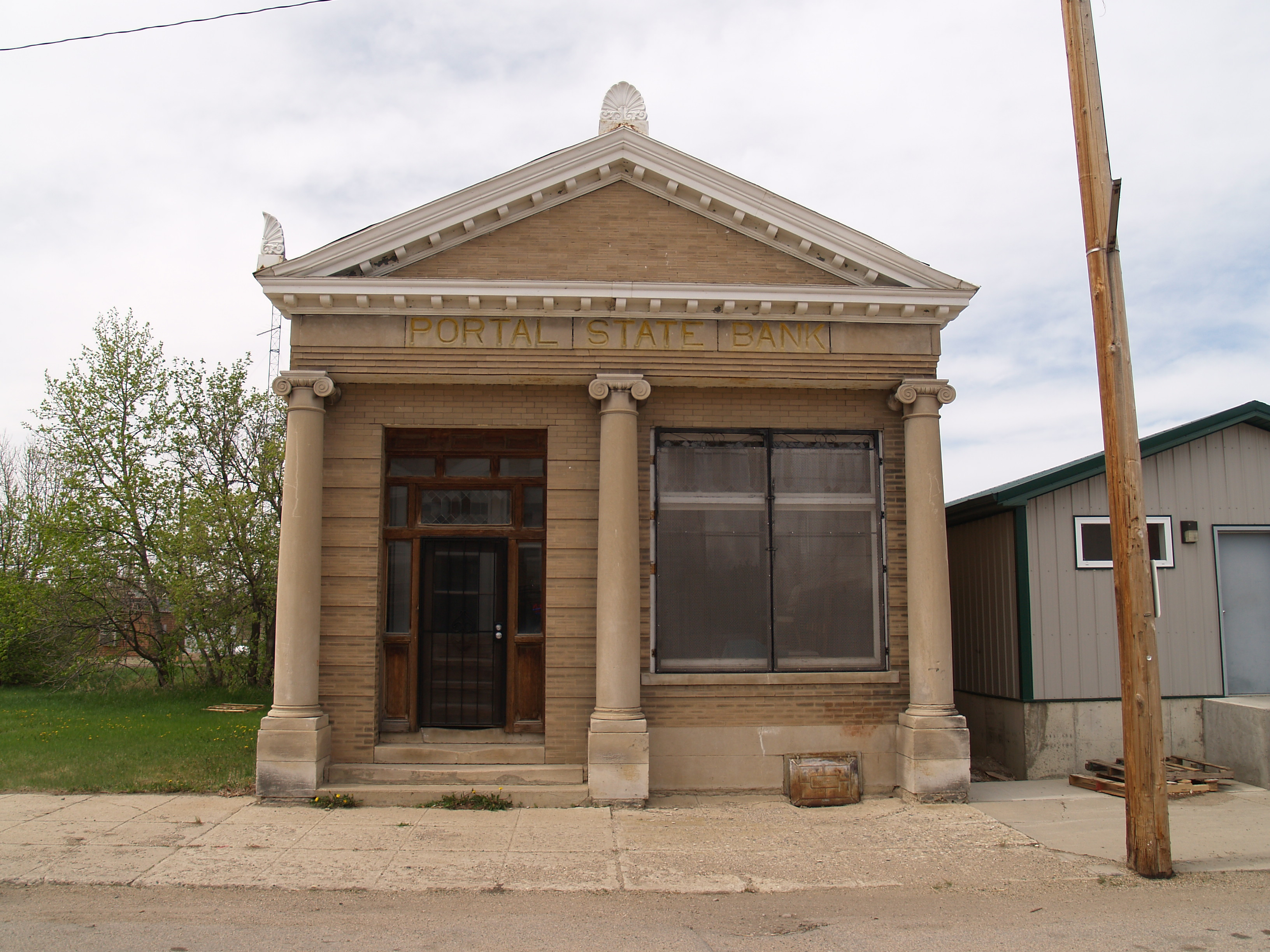
- Union Bank of Portal

- Location within the U.S. state of North Dakota
- Coordinates: 48.786453°N 102.520087°W
- Country: United States
- State: North Dakota
- Founded: July 12, 1910 (created); July 15, 1910 (organized)
- Named for: John Burke
- Seat: Bowbells
- Largest city: Powers Lake

Area
  - Total: 1,128.999 sq mi (2,924.09 km^{2})
  - Land: 1,103.619 sq mi (2,858.36 km^{2})
  - Water: 25.380 sq mi (65.73 km^{2}) 2.25%

Population (2020)
  - Total: 2,201
  - Estimate (2025): 2,132 ▼
  - Density: 1.952/sq mi (0.754/km^{2})
- Time zone: UTC−6 (Central)
  - Summer (DST): UTC−5 (CDT)
- Area code: 701
- Congressional district: At-large
- Website: burkecountynd.com

Burke County is a county on the north edge of the U.S. state of North Dakota, adjacent to the south line of Canada. As of the 2020 census, the population was 2,201, and was estimated to be 2,132 in 2025. The county seat is Bowbells and the largest city is Powers Lake. The county is named after John Burke, the tenth Governor of North Dakota.

== History ==
A vote was held on November 3, 1908, in which county voters authorized the partition of Burke County from what was then known as 'Imperial Ward County' (which consisted of what is now Burke, Mountrail, Renville, and Ward counties). Its name recognized the state governor at the time, John Burke. However, the vote was challenged in court, and appealed to the state supreme court. That court ruled on June 3, 1910, to uphold the election results, and on July 12, Governor Burke issued a proclamation creating Burke County. It was organized on July 15 with Bowbells being its county seat.

The county is managed by a two-member Board of Commissioners: Richard Owings (Lignite) and Shannon Holter (Bowbells). As of 2025 the board chair is Jarret Van Berkom.

== Geography ==
Burke County lies on the north line of North Dakota. Its north boundary line abuts the south boundary line of Saskatchewan, Canada. The Des Lacs River flows south-southeasterly through the east part of the county, and the White Earth River flows northeasterly through the lower part. The county terrain consists of semi-arid low hills in the northeast part of the county, with higher carved and eroded ridges on the southwestern portion of the county. The area is partly used for agriculture. The terrain slopes to the north; its highest point is on the lower west boundary line, at 2,461 ft (750 m) ASL.

According to the United States Census Bureau, the county has a total area of 1,128.999 square miles (2,924.09 km^{2}), of which 1,103.619 square miles (2,858.36 km^{2}) is land and 25.380 square miles (65.73 km^{2}) (2.25%) is water. It is the 33rd largest county in North Dakota by total area.

=== Major highways ===
- U.S. Highway 52
- North Dakota Highway 5
- North Dakota Highway 8
- North Dakota Highway 40
- North Dakota Highway 50

=== Adjacent counties and rural municipalities ===
- Estevan No. 5, Saskatchewan – north
- Coalfields No. 4, Saskatchewan – north
- Enniskillen No. 3, Saskatchewan – north
- Renville County – east
- Ward County – southeast
- Mountrail County – south
- Williams County – southwest
- Divide County – west

=== Protected areas ===
- Des Lacs National Wildlife Refuge (part)
- Lostwood National Wildlife Refuge (part)

=== Lakes ===
- Beaver Lake
- Enget Lake
- Iverson Slough
- Powers Lake (part)
- Shallow Lake
- Swensons Slouth
- Teal Slough
- Thompson Slough
- Upper Thompson Lake

== Demographics ==
Historical population
Census	Pop.	Note	%±
1910	9,064		—
1920	9,511		4.9%
1930	9,998		5.1%
1940	7,653		−23.5%
1950	6,621		−13.5%
1960	5,886		−11.1%
1970	4,739		−19.5%
1980	3,822		−19.4%
1990	3,002		−21.5%
2000	2,242		−25.3%
2010	1,968		−12.2%
2020	2,201		11.8%
2025 (est.)	2,132	▼	−3.1%
U.S. Decennial Census; 1790–1960 1900–1990; 1990–2000 2010–2020

As of the fourth quarter of 2024, the median home value in Burke County was $150,351. As of the 2023 American Community Survey, there are 931 estimated households in Burke County with an average of 2.32 persons per household. The county has a median household income of $96,339. Approximately 9.0% of the county's population lives at or below the poverty line. Burke County has an estimated 64.6% employment rate, with 23.5% of the population holding a bachelor's degree or higher and 92.7% holding a high school diploma.

The top five reported ancestries (people were allowed to report up to two ancestries, thus the figures will generally add to more than 100%) were English (95.9%), Spanish (1.5%), Indo-European (0.2%), Asian and Pacific Islander (2.4%), and Other (0.0%). The median age in the county was 41.1 years.

Burke County, North Dakota – racial and ethnic composition
Note: the US Census treats Hispanic/Latino as an ethnic category. This table excludes Latinos from the racial categories and assigns them to a separate category. Hispanics/Latinos may be of any race.

Race / ethnicity (NH = non-Hispanic)	Pop. 1980	Pop. 1990	Pop. 2000	Pop. 2010	Pop. 2020
White alone (NH)	3,794 (99.27%)	2,970 (98.93%)	2,220 (99.02%)	1,891 (96.09%)	2,049 (93.09%)
Black or African American alone (NH)	3 (0.08%)	1 (0.03%)	3 (0.13%)	4 (0.20%)	12 (0.55%)
Native American or Alaska Native alone (NH)	5 (0.13%)	11 (0.37%)	5 (0.22%)	12 (0.61%)	21 (0.95%)
Asian alone (NH)	5 (0.13%)	6 (0.20%)	3 (0.13%)	13 (0.66%)	12 (0.55%)
Pacific Islander alone (NH)	—	—	0 (0.00%)	0 (0.00%)	0 (0.00%)
Other race alone (NH)	0 (0.00%)	0 (0.00%)	0 (0.00%)	0 (0.00%)	5 (0.23%)
Mixed race or multiracial (NH)	—	—	3 (0.13%)	11 (0.56%)	43 (1.95%)
Hispanic or Latino (any race)	15 (0.39%)	14 (0.47%)	8 (0.36%)	37 (1.88%)	59 (2.68%)
Total	3,822 (100.00%)	3,002 (100.00%)	2,242 (100.00%)	1,968 (100.00%)	2,201 (100.00%)

=== 2024 estimate ===
As of the 2024 estimate, there were 2,154 people and 931 households residing in the county. There were 1,383 housing units at an average density of 1.25 per square mile (0.5/km^{2}). The racial makeup of the county was 94.5% White (91.2% NH White), 0.8% African American, 1.6% Native American, 1.0% Asian, 0.1% Pacific Islander, _% from some other races and 1.9% from two or more races. Hispanic or Latino people of any race were 3.6% of the population.

=== 2020 census ===
As of the 2020 census, the county had a population of 2,201, 954 households, and 576 families residing in the county. Of the residents, 25.4% were under the age of 18 and 20.4% were 65 years of age or older; the median age was 41.4 years. For every 100 females there were 117.5 males, and for every 100 females age 18 and over there were 114.8 males.

The population density was 2.0 inhabitants per square mile (0.8/km^{2}). There were 1,378 housing units at an average density of 1.25 per square mile (0.5/km^{2}).

The racial makeup of the county was 94.6% White, 0.6% African American, 1.1% Native American, 0.5% Asian, 0.7% from some other race, and 2.5% from two or more races. Hispanic or Latino residents of any race comprised 2.7% of the population.

There were 954 households in the county, of which 26.7% had children under the age of 18 living with them and 18.6% had a female householder with no spouse or partner present. About 35.4% of all households were made up of individuals and 15.3% had someone living alone who was 65 years of age or older.

There were 1,378 housing units, of which 30.8% were vacant. Among occupied housing units, 80.9% were owner-occupied and 19.1% were renter-occupied. The homeowner vacancy rate was 4.0% and the rental vacancy rate was 33.7%.

=== 2010 census ===
As of the 2010 census, there were 1,968 people, 913 households, and 567 families residing in the county. The population density was 1.8 inhabitants per square mile (0.7/km^{2}). There were 1,340 housing units at an average density of 1.21 per square mile (0.5/km^{2}). The racial makeup of the county was 97.76% White, 0.20% African American, 0.76% Native American, 0.71% Asian, 0.00% Pacific Islander, 0.00% from some other races and 0.56% from two or more races. Hispanic or Latino people of any race were 1.88% of the population. In terms of ancestry, 45.2% were of Norwegian, 34.9% German, 13% Swedish, and 10% Danish.

There were 913 households, 22.6% had children under the age of 18 living with them, 52.4% were married couples living together, 5.4% had a female householder with no husband present, 37.9% were non-families, and 33.6% of all households were made up of individuals. The average household size was 2.15 and the average family size was 2.74. The median age was 48.1 years.

The median income for a household in the county was $50,800 and the median income for a family was $62,283. Males had a median income of $49,958 versus $27,206 for females. The per capita income for the county was $32,347. About 3.3% of families and 5.8% of the population were below the poverty line, including 9.4% of those under age 18 and 6.1% of those age 65 or over.

== Economy ==
The main industries in Burke County are farming and oil extraction. Burke County is one of several western North Dakota counties with significant exposure to the Bakken Formation in the Williston Basin.

== Communities ==
=== Cities ===
- Bowbells (county seat)
- Columbus
- Flaxton
- Lignite
- Portal
- Powers Lake

=== Census-designated place ===
- Larson

=== Unincorporated communities ===
- Atcoal
- Battleview
- Coteau
- Kincaid
- Northgate
- Perella
- Rival
- Stampede
- Woburn

=== Townships ===
The cities, census-designated places and unincorporated communities are located within the organized civil townships, which currently have no governmental authority.

- Battleview
- Bowbells
- Carter
- Clayton
- Cleary
- Colville
- Dale
- Dimond
- Fay
- Foothills
- Forthun
- Garness
- Harmonious
- Kandiyohi
- Keller
- Lakeview
- Leaf Mountain
- Lucy
- Minnesota
- North Star
- Portal
- Richland
- Roseland
- Short Creek
- Soo
- Thorson
- Vale
- Vanville
- Ward

== Politics ==
Burke County voters have been reliably Republican for several decades. In no national election since 1964 has the county selected the Democratic Party candidate (as of 2024). In 1912, it was one of only four counties nationwide to vote for Socialist nominee Eugene Debs.

United States presidential election results for Burke County, North Dakota
Year	Republican		Democratic		Third party(ies)	
Year	No.	%	No.	%	No.	%
1912	264	23.57%	308	27.50%	548	48.93%
1916	518	31.37%	922	55.84%	211	12.78%
1920	1,911	70.94%	456	16.93%	327	12.14%
1924	996	39.62%	135	5.37%	1,383	55.01%
1928	2,002	58.38%	1,336	38.96%	91	2.65%
1932	906	25.21%	2,473	68.81%	215	5.98%
1936	684	18.33%	1,821	48.81%	1,226	32.86%
1940	1,951	57.53%	1,342	39.58%	98	2.89%
1944	1,540	54.47%	1,226	43.37%	61	2.16%
1948	1,212	50.95%	972	40.86%	195	8.20%
1952	1,986	69.90%	811	28.55%	44	1.55%
1956	1,415	59.98%	936	39.68%	8	0.34%
1960	1,609	59.88%	1,076	40.04%	2	0.07%
1964	974	40.02%	1,454	59.74%	6	0.25%
1968	1,239	56.83%	808	37.06%	133	6.10%
1972	1,446	66.36%	651	29.88%	82	3.76%
1976	1,087	52.03%	899	43.03%	103	4.93%
1980	1,442	73.27%	418	21.24%	108	5.49%
1984	1,298	69.45%	543	29.05%	28	1.50%
1988	971	57.46%	693	41.01%	26	1.54%
1992	551	36.15%	458	30.05%	515	33.79%
1996	483	44.35%	416	38.20%	190	17.45%
2000	698	67.18%	296	28.49%	45	4.33%
2004	808	69.36%	336	28.84%	21	1.80%
2008	640	67.87%	286	30.33%	17	1.80%
2012	769	75.17%	230	22.48%	24	2.35%
2016	895	85.08%	119	11.31%	38	3.61%
2020	994	86.06%	137	11.86%	24	2.08%
2024	909	86.08%	130	12.31%	17	1.61%

== See also ==
- National Register of Historic Places listings in Burke County, North Dakota
