= Crosby Wetland Management District =

- IUCN category IV (habitat/species management area)
- Location within the United States
- Location: North Dakota, USA
- Nearest city: Crosby, ND
- Coordinates: 48°52′48″N 103°28′55″W
- Area: >95,000 acres (385 km^{2})
- Governing body: U.S. Fish and Wildlife Service
- Website: Crosby Wetland Management District

The Crosby Wetland Management District is located in the U.S. state of North Dakota. The district is located in the extreme northwestern section of North Dakota, along the border with Canada and the state of Montana. Within the district is the Lake Zahl National Wildlife Refuge, 96 parcels of land owned by the U.S. Government which are managed as Waterfowl Production Areas, and several hundred easement refuges that are on privately owned land which are cooperatively managed by the landowners and the U.S. Fish and Wildlife Service.

The region is known for being one of the finest in North America for nesting and breeding sites for hundreds of species of birds, especially waterfowl. The region also has upland sections that are prime habitat for game birds such as the grouse and pheasant, and numerous small mammals and white-tailed deer can be found.
