= Lostwood National Wildlife Refuge =

Federally managed region of North Dakota, United States

- IUCN category IV (habitat/species management area)
- Location within the United States
- Location: Burke and Mountrail counties, North Dakota, United States
- Nearest city: Stanley, ND
- Coordinates: 48°34′08″N 102°26′51″W
- Area: 26,747 acres (10,824 ha)
- Established: 1935
- Governing body: U.S. Fish and Wildlife Service
- Website: Lostwood National Wildlife Refuge

The Lostwood National Wildlife Refuge is located in the U.S. state of North Dakota. The refuge manages two other refuges and two wetland management districts. The refuge also includes the Lostwood Wilderness which comprises almost a quarter of all the area of the refuge. The refuge is considered a prime migratory and nesting bird sanctuary with over 250 different species identified and tens of thousands of birds using the refuge annually. In 1964, the once believed to be extinct giant Canada goose (Branta canadensis maxima) a subspecies of the better known and much more common Canada goose, was reintroduced into the refuge, and their numbers have greatly increased. Additionally, numerous mammal species reside on the refuge, the largest being the moose.

The refuge is managed by the Lostwood Wetland Management District.
