= Des Lacs National Wildlife Refuge =

National Wildlife Refuge in North Dakota, US

- IUCN category IV (habitat/species management area)
- Location within the United States
- Location: Burke / Ward counties, North Dakota, USA
- Nearest city: Kenmare, ND
- Coordinates: 48°50′34″N 102°05′45″W
- Area: 19,500 acres (79 km^{2})
- Established: 1935
- Governing body: U.S. Fish and Wildlife Service
- Website: Des Lacs National Wildlife Refuge

The Des Lacs National Wildlife Refuge is located in the U.S. state of North Dakota and extends from the Canada–United States border to near the town of Kenmare, North Dakota along Des Lacs Lake. The refuge was established in 1935 and includes 19,500 acres (78.9 km^{2}). The refuge is considered to be one of the most important bird sanctuaries in the U.S., with tens of thousands of birds using the refuge for migration and breeding. The refuge is also home to elk, moose, bison and pronghorn.

== Riviere des Lacs - River of the Lakes ==
Des lacs is from the French wording Riviere des Lacs, or River of the lakes. Early trappers would call the refuge this due to the areas prominent features.

== Description ==
The refuge is located within the Upper Souris River Basin. Two other refuges are also located within the Souris River basin, namely the J. Clark Salyer National Wildlife Refuge and the Upper Souris National Wildlife Refuge The total area for all three refuges encompasses close to 24,600 square miles, with only 5,500 miles located in the United States.

== History ==
The Souris River and Des Lacs river were formed by two large glacial lakes around 10,000 years ago. The meltwater spilled from these glacial lakes and cut out steep, high-relief valleys characterized by well drained, level to steep loams formed in glacial till.

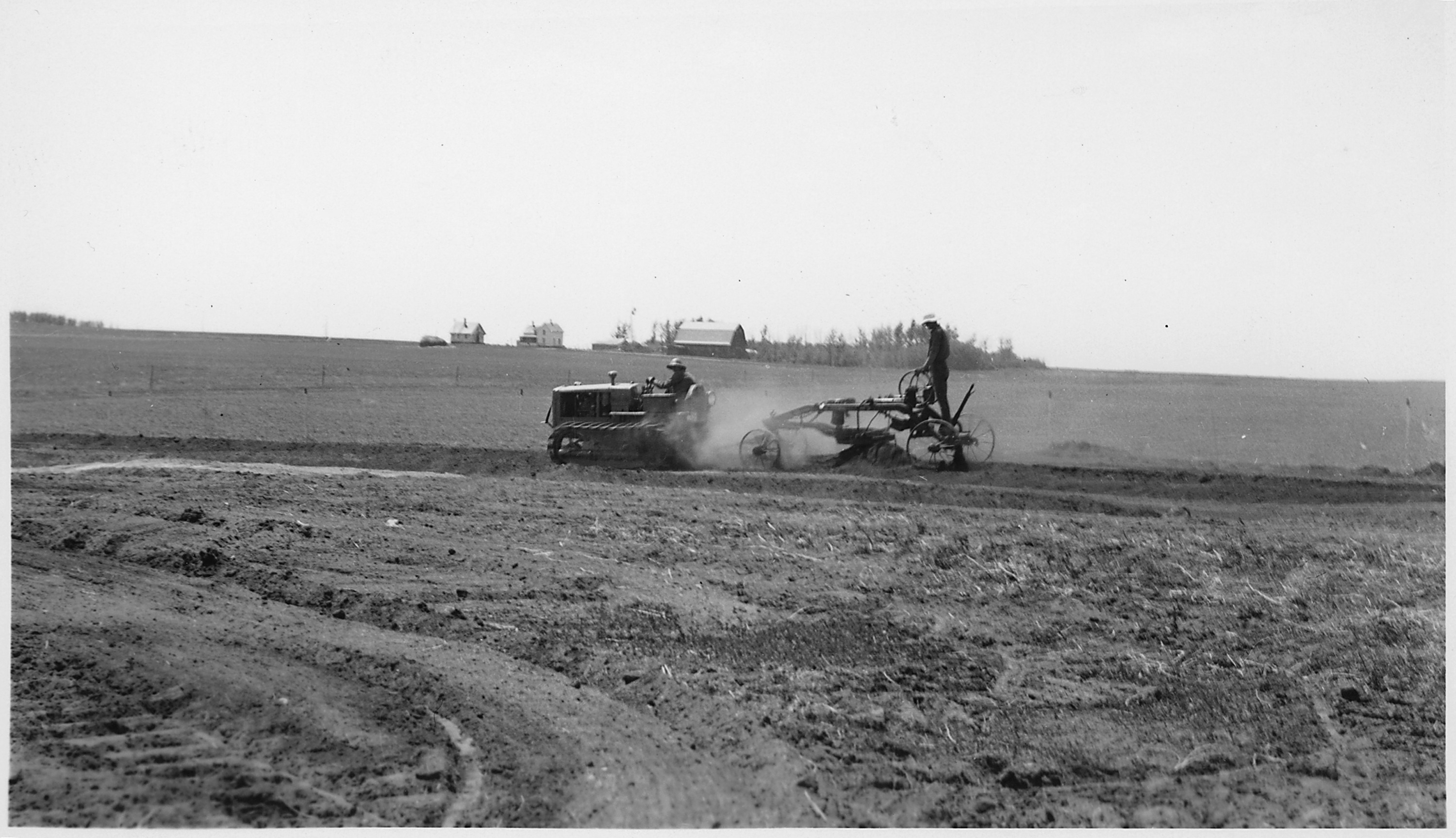
Mechanized road-grading. Des Lacs NWR, ND, 1938. A small bulldozer pulls a riding plow in open fields, with farm buildings and crops in background

The area was once home to the southern Assiniboin tribes, who now reside in Canada. The area gained status as a National Wildlife Refuge during the 1930s as a project by the Civilian Conservation Corps. The intended goal was to protect the refuges various waterfowl populations.

In the 1990s Des Lacs underwent the construction of eight artificial islands to provide nesting habitat. These habitats were primarily for mallard, gadwall, and Canada goose. These islands were ideal nesting conditions as they were (1) Predator controlled; (2) Surrounded by open water; (3) highly vegetated with low shrubs and leafy spurge. Unfortunately the islands were not maintained due to costs, and now are rarely used by nesting waterfowl because they fail to deter predators.

== Services ==
=== Hunting ===
The hunting program offers deer, turkey, pheasant, gray partridge, sharp-tailed grouse, cottontail, snowshoe hare, and fox. Hunting waterfowl, however, is not permitted.

=== Fishing ===
Fishing does not occur at the refuge.

=== Wildlife Observation and Wildlife Photography ===
The scenic byway is a route that travels through 14 miles of the Des Lacs National Wildlife Refuge. This area includes Upper Des Lacs, Middle Des Lacs, Lower Des Lacs lakes, and driving through Kenmare. Interpretive panels are located throughout.

There are also four nature trails available at the refuge. These include the Canada Goose Trail, Munch's Coulee Hiking Trail, White-tailed Deer Trail, Tasker's Coulee's informal nature trails.
