= KLPZ =

- Parker, Arizona; United States
- Broadcast area: Lake Havasu City, Arizona
- Frequency: 1380 kHz
- Branding: 1380 AM Country

Programming
- Format: Country, talk

Ownership
- Owner: Keith Douglas Learn; (Learn Broadcasting Corporation)

History
- First air date: September 7, 1974
- Last air date: December 31, 2024
- Former call signs: KZUL (1974–1984)
- Call sign meaning: La Paz County

Technical information
- Licensing authority: FCC
- Facility ID: 66361
- Class: D
- Power: 2,500 watts (day); 58 watts (night)
- Transmitter coordinates: 34°9′19.2″N 114°17′28.0″W

Links
- Public license information: Public file; LMS
- Website: www.klpz1380.com

KLPZ (1380 AM) was a radio station licensed to serve Parker, Arizona, United States. The station was owned by Keith Douglas Learn, through licensee Learn Broadcasting Corporation. It aired a country music and talk radio format.

The station went on the air in 1974 as KZUL, which played contemporary pop country, and later middle of the road and adult contemporary music. William Olson Jr., who co-founded the station with Rick L. and Lyle J. Murphy, bought out their stakes in 1977, sold it to Charles L. Scofield in 1982. It became KLPZ, for La Paz County, in 1984. KLPZ was a country music and talk radio station from 1993 until its closure. Learn bought the station in 2000, and closed it at the end of 2024 following his retirement.

== History ==
O. M. Broadcasting, a company controlled by Rick L. and Lyle J. Murphy and William Olson Jr., was granted a construction permit for a 1,000-watt daytime-only station on 1380 kHz on May 22, 1974. The new station signed on at 11 a.m. on September 7 as KZUL ("Kazual"), an ABC Entertainment affiliate playing contemporary pop country. Within a year, KZUL had a middle of the road format, though it was devoting 18 hours a week to country music by 1978. KZUL increased its power to 2,500 watts in 1976; it was the first station to be authorized at this power level. O. M. Broadcasting also applied for an FM radio station on 99.3 MHz; this allocation was instead awarded on July 7, 1977, to competing applicant Gilbert Leivas's BINA Broadcasting, who started KMDX in 1978. The Murphys sold their stake in KZUL to Olson in 1977.

O. M. Broadcasting sold KZUL to Scofield Broadcasting for $225,000 in 1982; Scofield's principals were Charles L. Scofield, owner of KEYZ, KYYZ, and a cable television system in Williston, North Dakota, and his wife Lorraine A. Scofield. The station, which had evolved to adult contemporary music, became KLPZ on March 6, 1984; the new call sign was derived from La Paz County, which had recently been split from Yuma County and of which Parker is the seat. Station founder Rick Murphy would subsequently start a new KZUL-FM in Lake Havasu City.

Until January 1993, KLPZ played adult standards music during the winter months and adult contemporary music in the summer, both supplementing country music. It then became a full-time country station, with programming from Jones Satellite Networks. "The All New 1380 AM Country" also added The Rush Limbaugh Show on February 1, 1993; it would carry the program until Limbaugh's death in 2021, and was also an affiliate of the successor Clay Travis and Buck Sexton Show. KLPZ also carried Paul Harvey until his death in 2009.

Keith Learn and Juanita Casares bought KLPZ in 2000; they had been with the station since 1993, and hosted the morning show. Under their ownership, the station described its format as "Country and a Little More", in reflection of its talk programming and the occasional non-country songs on the playlist, and used the slogan "The Last Medium of Freedom".

The Learns announced on December 6, 2024, that they would retire on December 31; regular programming on KLPZ would then end. Learn Broadcasting requested the cancellation of the KLPZ license in February 2025. The license was cancelled on February 7, 2025.
