= KGCX (AM) =

Radio station in Sidney, Montana (1926–1993)

- Sidney, Montana; United States
- Broadcast area: Sidney-Williston
- Frequency: 1480 kHz

Programming
- Format: Classic country

Ownership
- Owner: Halvorson and Teacher families; (KGCX, Inc.)
- Sister stations: KGCH-FM

History
- First air date: October 1926
- Last air date: August 2, 1993
- Former frequencies: 1250 kHz (1926–1927); 1230 kHz (1927–1928); 1420 kHz (1928–1929); 1310 kHz (1929–1936); 1450 kHz (1936–1941)

Technical information
- Facility ID: 34458
- Power: 5,000 watts
- Transmitter coordinates: 47°46′26″N 104°06′54″W

KGCX was a radio station in Sidney, Montana. It was the second station to operate in the state, originally based in Vida, later moving to Wolf Point. After several frequency and city changes, KGCX moved to 1480 kHz and Sidney in 1941 and 1942, where it would remain for the next 51 years until being closed in 1993.

== History ==
=== Vida and Wolf Point ===
KGCX took to the air in October 1926 as the second radio station in Montana. At launch, it prided itself on being the smallest broadcasting station in the world; it was located in Vida, a town with a population of 50. The first licensee was the First State Bank of Vida. Broadcasting with 10 watts on 1250 and then 1230 kHz, General Order 40 sent the station to 1420 kHz, where it remained just six months before relocating to 1310 in May 1929. The station was moved to the larger town of Wolf Point in 1929, contingent on a power increase to 250 watts day and 100 night. In 1933, the station's license was transferred to E.E. Krebsbach, who had previously been connected with the bank. KGCX moved frequencies two more times, to 1450 kHz in 1936 and to 1480 kHz upon NARBA coming into effect in 1941.

=== Move to Sidney ===
In 1942, KGCX moved from Wolf Point to Sidney, a move of 77 miles (124 km); the station's facilities were disassembled in Wolf Point and relocated to their new site, with the station beginning operations in Sidney on August 28. Successive power increases brought the station to 5,000 watts day and night by 1948.

In programming, KGCX was a rare American affiliate of the Canadian Broadcasting Corporation between 1936 and 1945, when it hooked up with the Mutual Broadcasting System instead, an affiliation it would maintain for the rest of its history. In the late 1950s, it moved its studios to the LaLonde Hotel from the Suksdorf Building, where it first set up when it moved from Wolf Point. The station also established auxiliary studios in Williston, North Dakota, in 1945 and in Plentywood, Montana, and Watford City, North Dakota, in 1958.

=== Sale to the Halvorson and Folkvard families ===
Krebsbach owned the station until his death of cancer in 1970; by this time, he also owned a new station in Wolf Point, KVCK. Krebsbach's son, E. Clair, sold KGCX two years later for more than $300,000 to the Halvorson and Folkvard families; his other son, Keith, who was the station's general manager, had died when he was struck by lightning in 1964.

August 9, 1981, brought KGCX a sister station, 100,000-watt KGCH-FM 93.1, and their first competitor, KSDY-FM 95.1, followed that November. At this time, KGCX broadcast a country format, with the new FM station airing adult contemporary music. There were two crucial changes in the landscape in 1987. In March, KSDY folded amid financial troubles in a slow regional economy, while August saw KGCH-FM shift to country and KGCX to classic country.

In 1992, the Folkvards sold their shares to Ted and Kay Tescher, but a year later, KGCX and KGCH-FM called it quits. The Halvorsons opted to shutter the radio stations at 11 p.m. on the night of August 2, 1993; the stations went off the air as normal but never returned. Eleven people were put out of work; even though sales manager Arch Ellwein and a local economic development group offered to buy the stations, their bids were turned down. The closure of KGCX and KGCH-FM left Sidney without any local radio stations; when the town's high school won a state football championship, listeners had to hear their games on a Williston station.

The AM frequency was not reactivated, but local radio in Sidney eventually returned with the launch of KTHC in December 1996. The 93.1 frequency formerly belonging to KGCH-FM reemerged on June 1, 2004, as a new station with the KGCX call letters formerly on 1480 AM.
