= KXWI =

Radio station in Williston, North Dakota

Coordinates: 48.058611°N 104.001389°W

- Williston, North Dakota; United States
- Broadcast area: Williston, North Dakota; Watford City, North Dakota; Sidney, Montana
- Frequency: 98.5 MHz
- Branding: Coyote Country

Programming
- Format: Country

Ownership
- Owner: Andrew Sturlaugson; (P&A Media LLC)
- Sister stations: KDSR, KGCX

History
- First air date: 2014

Technical information
- Licensing authority: FCC
- Facility ID: 190377
- Class: C1
- ERP: 100,000 watts
- HAAT: 243 meters (797 ft)

Links
- Public license information: Public file; LMS
- Webcast: Listen live
- Website: web.kdsrradio.com/kxwi-98-5/

KXWI (98.5 MHz) is a radio station licensed to Williston, North Dakota, which serves northwestern North Dakota and northeastern Montana. The station airs a country music format and its morning show, hosted by Tom Simon, is the most listened to show in the Bakken. KXWI is owned by Andrew Sturlaugson's P&A Media. It has been on the air since 2014.

== History ==
KXWI began broadcasting in 2014 under the ownership of Stephen A. Marks, through his Williston Community Broadcasting. Marks already owned KDSR and KGCX in the area.

Stephen Marks died on May 11, 2022. Andrew Sturlaugson's P&A Media acquired Marks' Montana and North Dakota radio stations, including KXWI, KDSR, and KGCX, for $850,000 in 2024.
