= KEYZ =

Radio station in Williston, North Dakota

Coordinates: 48°14′20.1″N 103°39′2.7″W

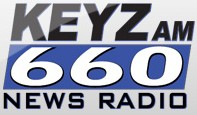
- Williston, North Dakota; United States
- Frequency: 660 kHz
- Branding: 660 KEYZ; 660 KEYZ Country (classic country programming)

Programming
- Format: News/talk, classic country
- Affiliations: ABC News Radio; Premiere Networks; United Stations Radio Networks; Westwood One; Minnesota Vikings

Ownership
- Owner: Townsquare Media; (Townsquare License, LLC)
- Sister stations: KTHC, KYYZ

History
- First air date: 1948 (as KWBM at 1450)
- Former call signs: KWBM (1948–1955)
- Former frequencies: 1450 kHz, 1360 kHz
- Call sign meaning: "Keys"

Technical information
- Licensing authority: FCC
- Facility ID: 10511
- Class: B
- Power: 5,000 watts
- Translator: 103.3 K277DR (Williston)

Links
- Public license information: Public file; LMS
- Webcast: Listen Live
- Website: keyzradio.com

KEYZ (660 AM) is a local radio station in Williston, North Dakota. The station broadcasts news/talk, as well as classic country music 24 hours a day. KEYZ has a 5,000–watt signal that covers more than 20 counties and portions of two Canadian provinces. Additionally, it is heard in the immediate Williston area on FM translator K277DR, at 103.3 FM.

The station also has two sister stations, KTHC and KYYZ. All three stations are owned by Townsquare Media, and are located at 410 6th Street East, on Williston's east side.

== History ==
KWBM signed on in 1948 at 1450 kHz. The new station was owned by the Williston Broadcasting Company and was Williston's first licensed radio station, though KGCX of nearby Sidney, Montana, had opened a Williston studio in 1946. Its finances prevented the station from being an immediate success. On June 30, 1950, KWBM went silent, shortly followed by a bankruptcy petition. In February 1951, the Federal Communications Commission authorized its sale to Charles L. Scofield and James Caravaras for $100 and the assumption of more than $8,000 in station liabilities. Jack McGeehan, who later went on to be a state representative from Williams County in 1971, was an on-air personality at KWBM. Scofield would also serve in the state legislature.

KWBM became KEYZ in 1955. The station established a second studio in Crosby, 70 miles (110 km) away, and it bought an aircraft to help it serve clients in its 100-mile trading radius. It was the only station in North Dakota to maintain its own aircraft. By 1960, the station was on its third plane: a Beechcraft Bonanza. In addition to sales calls, KEYZ's plane was put to use for news coverage, farm programming, promotional events, executive travel, and even search and rescue efforts. In 1957, KEYZ was approved to move to 1360 kHz, permitting a power boost from 250 to 5,000 watts. The company grew with the establishment of the Community Service Television cable system in 1967, and in 1979, the signing on of FM outlet KYYZ.

In 1985, after a five-year hearing, Basin Broadcasters, owned by former KGCX general manager Duane Simpson, obtained the construction permit for a new station at 660 kHz in Williston, beating out KEYZ on diversification and integration criteria. Basin had also put on air the first commercial competitor to KEYZ-KYYZ, KDSR, which began operations on February 28, 1985. The permit was granted despite a petition to deny by the clear channel station on 660 being broken down: WNBC in New York, which claimed the new facility would cause objectionable skywave interference. The construction permit took the KQSR call letters. In 1987, Basin sold the construction permit to Scofield for nearly $72,000. In March 1991, KEYZ's intellectual unit moved to the new 660 facility, while 1360 was taken silent and its license surrendered.

STARadio acquired Scofield's broadcasting holdings in 1996. In 2000, it sold its Williston-Sidney cluster and four additional Montana stations for $7.3 million to Commonwealth Communications. The Williston-Sidney cluster was sold to Cherry Creek Radio in 2003 as part of a $41 million, 24-station transaction.

In 2018, KEYZ was granted an AM revitalization translator, giving it a 250-watt FM signal at 103.3 MHz.

Effective June 17, 2022, Cherry Creek Radio sold KEYZ as part of a 42 station/21 translator package to Townsquare Media for $18.75 million.
