= Nico Rios =

American politician

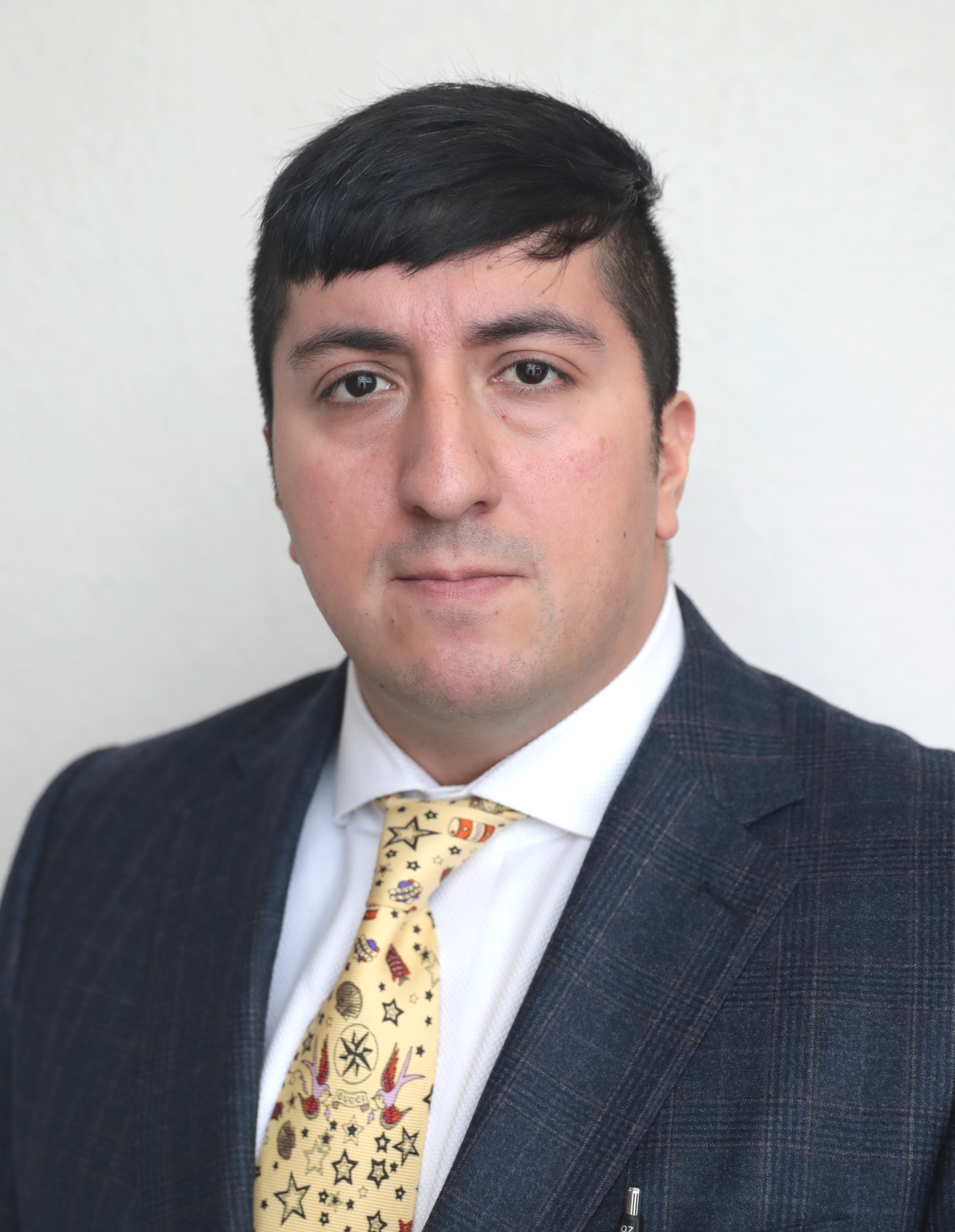
- Rios in 2022

Member of the North Dakota House of Representatives from the 23rd district
- Incumbent
- Assumed office December 1, 2022 Serving with Dennis Nehring
- Succeeded by: Corey Johnson (elect)

Personal details
- Born: Chicago, Illinois, US
- Party: Republican

Nico Rios is an American politician affiliated with the Republican Party. He has served as a representative for the 23rd district in the North Dakota House of Representatives since 2022, alongside Scott Dyk and Dennis Nehring.

== Early life ==
Rios was born in Chicago, Illinois in October 1988 and raised in the South Side of the city.

He moved to North Dakota in 2014 to pursue a career in the oil industry.

== Career ==
Prior to moving to North Dakota, Rios worked in Senator Ted Cruz's Washington, D.C., office. As of 2022, he was working as a wireline operator in Williston.

In April 2022, Rios was named as the 23rd Republican candidate for the ND House of Representatives. Regarding the upcoming elections Rios said "The type of medical and economic tyranny we saw across the country due to covid made me want to do something", during his run for office. On November 9, 2022, Rios won the election, which went unopposed, with his role as representative for the 23rd district becoming active from December 1, 2022.

After Rios was arrested December 15, 2023 for driving under the influence (DUI), Republican House Majority Leader, Mike Lefor, state party officials, and local Republican Party leaders called for Rios to stand down, with the ND 23rd District GOP Executive Committee requesting his resignation. After being sentenced to probation and a fine in January 2024, Rios refused to resign, saying “My terrible decisions that night will not hinder my ability to represent and fight for the people of District 23.”

On 2 February 2025, after Mexico instituted retaliatory tariffs in response to the Second Trump tariffs, Rios called for the overthrow of Mexican president Claudia Sheinbaum in an antisemitic post on Twitter, calling for the CIA to "help Trump overthrow and kick this Jew out of power in Mexico". This led to renewed calls for his resignation. The District 23 NDGOP executive committee adopted a vote of no confidence in Rios' ability to represent the district, and North Dakota Republican Party Chair Sandi Sanford condemned Rios' post and behavior.

In February 2025, Rios filed a Resolution to be passed by the ND House "That North Dakota acknowledge the Kingship of Jesus Christ over all the world so that this great state may at last receive the great blessings of real liberty, well-ordered discipline, peace, and harmony."

In January 2026, Rios announced in a statement to the North Dakota Monitor that he would not seek reelection in 2026.

== Arrest ==
On December 15, 2023, Rios was pulled over at around 11:30 p.m. after he failed to stay in his lane. In a police report, he was noted as being "verbally abusive, homophobic, racially abusive and discriminatory" toward an officer. During the arrest, Rios told the officers that they would "regret picking on me because you don't know who the fuck I am."

Rios was charged with driving under the influence and refusing to provide a chemical test. He later pleaded guilty to drunk driving and was sentenced to nearly one year of unsupervised probation and a $1,000 fine.

In an apology statement, he said that "I decided to act like a dummie. They did nothing to deserve any sort of disrespect. I owe it to myself, my district, and everyone and I vow to make sure this never happens again."

== Personal life ==
As of 2022, Rios and his wife Caroline had been married for 5 years.

== See also ==
- Caught On Bodycam: 7 Most 'Entitled' Suspects Arrested by Police (50:39) (video). Law&Crime Network.
- Bodycam shows North Dakota lawmaker hurling racist and homophobic slurs in DUI arrest (video). The Independent.
- "Nico Rios". Ballotpedia.
