= Dennis Nehring =

American politician

Member of the North Dakota House of Representatives from the 23rd district
- Incumbent
- Assumed office May 6, 2024 Serving with Nico Rios
- Preceded by: Scott Dyk

Personal details
- Party: Republican
- Spouse: CeDale

Dennis Nehring is an American politician who has served as a member of the North Dakota House of Representatives since May 6, 2024 representing the 23rd House district. He was appointed to replace Scott Dyk. He served on the Williams County School District 8 School Board before the district became Williston Basin School District 7.

== Biography ==
Nehring earned a bachelor's degree from North Dakota State University. Nehring served in the U.S. Army.

North Dakota House of Representatives
Preceded by Scott Dyk	Member of the North Dakota House of Representatives; 2024–present	Succeeded by incumbent
