= Charles Scofield =

Charles Scofield may refer to:

- Charles A. Scofield (1853–1910), mayor of Norwalk, Connecticut
- Charles L. Scofield (1925–2024), member of the North Dakota House of Representatives
