= James Memorial Library =

- U.S. National Register of Historic Places
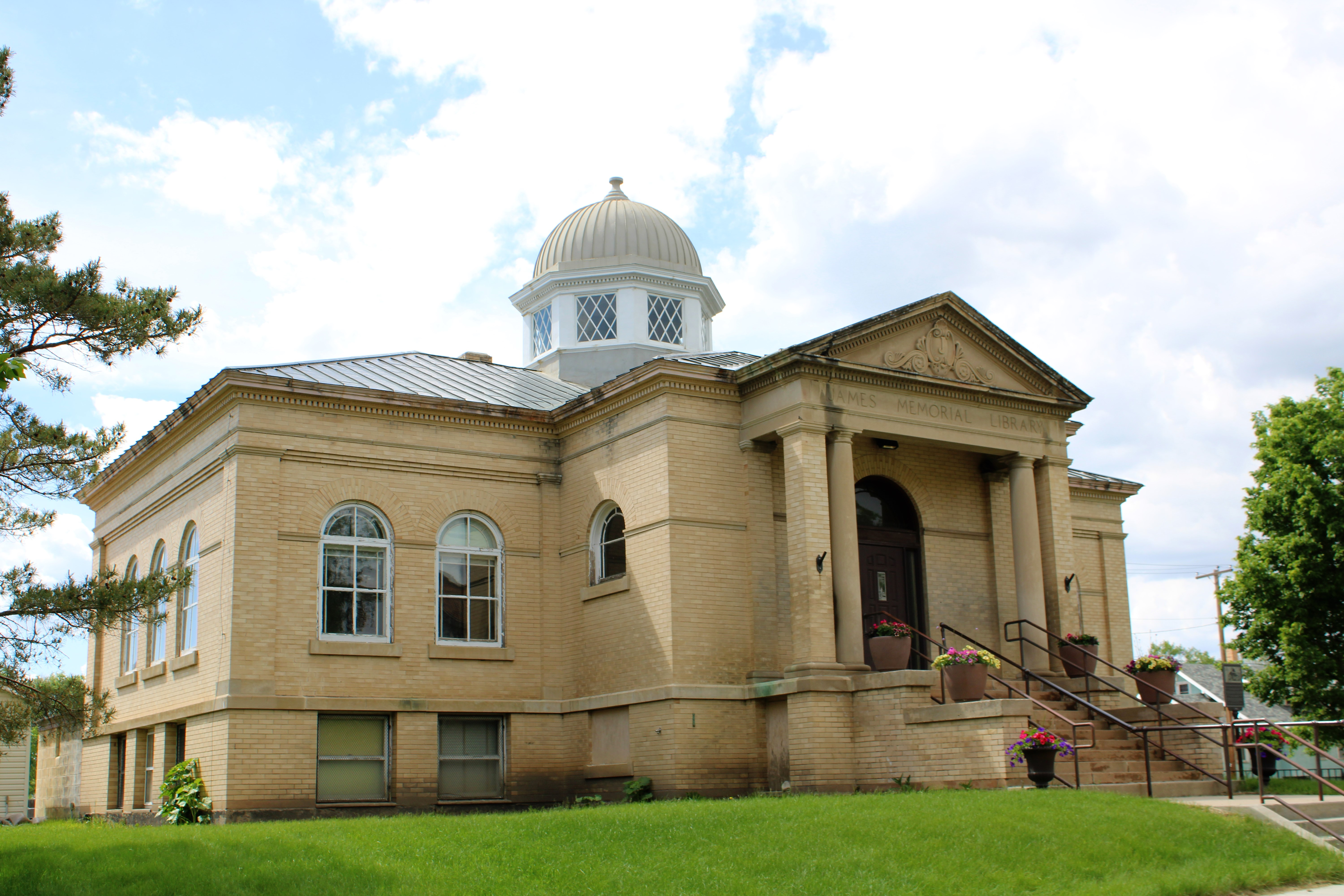

- Location within North Dakota Location within the United States
- Location: 621 1st Ave., W. Williston, North Dakota
- Coordinates: 48°9′0″N 103°37′26″W
- Area: less than one acre
- Built: 1911
- Built by: W.W. Horton
- Architect: R.S. Frost
- Architectural style: Beaux Arts
- NRHP reference No.: 79001777
- Added to NRHP: November 14, 1979

The James Memorial Library in Williston, North Dakota was built in 1911 in Beaux Arts style.

It was listed on the National Register of Historic Places in 1979.

According to its NRHP nomination, the library "is both architecturally and historically important to the Williston community."

The building is now home to the James Memorial Art Center. The Center includes an art gallery for exhibits of local, regional and international art in all media. An additional gallery is used for exhibitions, performances, meetings and receptions. There is an auditorium with a theatre, and a classroom for art classes for adults and children.
