= Williston High School (North Dakota) =

Coordinates: 48.156374°N 103.630031°W

Location
- 4200 32nd St W Williston, North Dakota 58801; USA

Information
- Type: Public
- Motto: Coyotes Take C.H.A.R.G.E
- School district: Williston Basin School District 7 (2021-); Williston Public School District #1 (-2021)
- Principal: Audrey Larson
- Teaching staff: 98.00 (FTE)
- Grades: 9-12
- Enrollment: 1,370 (2024–2025)
- Student to teacher ratio: 13.98
- Colors: Orange and black
- Mascot: Coyote
- Website: www.willistonschools.org/o/whs
- Williston High School
- U.S. National Register of Historic Places
- Location within North Dakota
- NRHP reference No.: 11000413
- Added to NRHP: June 27, 2011

Williston High School is a public high school located in Williston, North Dakota. It currently serves over 1,300 students and is a part of the Williston Basin School District 7. The official school colors are orange and black and the athletic teams are known as the Coyotes.

The original building, is now the Williston Middle School Central Campus and was the historic school building of Williston High School at 612 1st Ave. W. This building was listed on the U.S. National Register of Historic Places in 2011.

It was in the Williston Public School District 1 until it merged with Williams County School District 8 into the Williston Basin School District 7 in 2021. Prior to 2021, District 8, which was K-8 only, sent high school students to Williston High.

== Campus ==
In 2016 the new 195,000 sf high school was complete and included classrooms, support spaces, and vocational spaces, with a state-of-the-art auditorium and competition gymnasium.

== Career and Technical Education ==
A separate 20,000 SF career and technical education (CTE) building with four trade shops including Vo-Ag, building trades, automotive, and diesel mechanic shops completed the school campus. It also included four classrooms for meat lab, tech lab, health and science classrooms and a 900 SF greenhouse.

== Athletics ==
=== Championships ===
- State Class 'A' boys' basketball: 1948, 1963, 1968, 1975
- State Class 'A' girls' basketball: 1975, 1976, 1977
- State Class 'A' football: 1917, 1919, 1920
- State Class 'A' wrestling: 1958, 1959, 1985, 1999
- State Class 'A' volleyball: 2004
- State Class 'A' cross country: 1979, 1980, 1984, 2004
- State Class A cross country girls: 2020, 2021, 2022
- State Class 'A' baseball: 2008
- State Class 'A' girls' tennis: 1980, 1981, 1999

== Demographics ==
- 99% White
- .8% Native American
- .1% African American
- .1% Asian

== Notable alumni ==
- Quentin N. Burdick, Lawyer and former senator and congressman
- Virgil Hill, professional boxer
- Phil Jackson (1963), Naismith Memorial Basketball Hall of Fame coach and former NBA player
- Brent Qvale (2009), NFL tackle
- Brian Qvale (2007), professional basketball player
