= KTGO =

- Tioga, North Dakota; United States
- Broadcast area: Williston, North Dakota
- Frequency: 1090 kHz
- Branding: AM 1090 The Flag

Programming
- Format: Conservative talk radio
- Affiliations: Fox News Radio; Salem Radio Network; Westwood One

Ownership
- Owner: Flag Family Media; (Bakken Beacon Media LLC)
- Sister stations: WZFG

History
- First air date: February 24, 1967
- Call sign meaning: K-TiOGa (O and G transposed)

Technical information
- Licensing authority: FCC
- Facility ID: 67183
- Class: D
- Power: 1,100 watts day 6 watts night
- Transmitter coordinates: 48°23′28″N 102°56′4″W
- Translator: 92.7 K224FJ (Tioga)

Links
- Public license information: Public file; LMS
- Webcast: Listen Live
- Website: am1090theflag.com

KTGO (1090 AM, "AM 1090 The Flag") is a radio station licensed to Tioga, North Dakota, United States. The station mainly serves Williston, along with oil field workers in the nearby Bakken Formation.

The station is owned by Bakken Beacon Media LLC. It airs a conservative talk radio format drawn primarily from syndicated programs, including What's On Your Mind (syndicated from KFYR/Bismarck), The Hugh Hewitt Show, The Charlie Kirk Show, Fox Across America, The Chris Berg Show, and The Mark Levin Show. The station's local programming is limited to broadcasts of local high school sporting events and local church services on Sunday mornings.

KTGO is a member of the North Dakota Broadcasters Association.
