= Barry Petersen =

American journalist

Barry Petersen is a CBS News Correspondent. He has reported on wars, natural disasters, Paris fashions, the fading popularity of Welsh choirs, and the return of American jazz to Shanghai, China. He has worked for CBS News for more than three decades.

== Biography ==
After attending high school in Sidney, Montana, he studied at Northwestern University’s Medill School of Journalism.

Petersen wrote about his wife's diagnosis with early onset of Alzheimer's disease in 2005, in a work entitled "Jan's Story", which was published in June 2010.

Jan was also a CBS News journalist, reporting from both Japan and the former Soviet Union for CBS News Radio, CBS News Sunday Morning, and the CBS Weekend News.
