= Williston Herald =

Newspaper published in Williston, North Dakota, U.S.

- Type: Twice-weekly newspaper
- Owner: Forum Communications Company
- Founder: E.M. Crary
- Publisher: Heather Mayer
- Managing editor: James C. Falcon
- Founded: 1899; 127 years ago
- Language: English
- Headquarters: Williston, North Dakota
- Sister newspapers: Williston Plains Reporter
- OCLC number: 1769899
- Website: willistonherald.com

The Williston Herald is a twice weekly newspaper printed in Williston, North Dakota. The Herald is the official newspaper of Williams County, North Dakota and the main newspaper covering northwestern North Dakota and northeastern Montana. As of 2024, the newspaper is printed every Wednesday and Saturday.

== History ==
On August 17, 1899, E.M. Crary published the first edition of the weekly Williston Herald using the printing plant of the defunct The Langdon Times. In 1905, E.N. Disney, editor of the Detroit Standard, bought the paper. In 1910, Disney old the paper to George Farries. In 1924, S.T. Westdal and Harry E. Polk bought the paper from Farries. On Oct. 14, 1930, the Herald launched a daily edition consisting of a single sheet printed on both sides.

Westdal sold his stake to Thomas H. Moodie in 1931, who eventually sold out to Polk. The Herald became a full-sized standard daily paper in 1935, and joined the Associated Press wire service in 1938. The paper dedicated a new two-story headquarters in 1942. Polk sold the paper to Walter M. Wick in 1961. Polk died in 1971, and was inducted into the North Dakota Newspaper Hall of Fame in 1974. Wick purchased the weekly Williston Plains Reporter from Bill Shemorry in 1978.

Wick Communications named Randy Rickman publisher in 2014. A year later Wick reached an agreement with Forum Communications Company to print the Herald and Plain Reporter at its plant in Dickinson, North Dakota. Ken Harty became publisher in 2016, followed by Kelly Miller in 2019, Clarice Touhey in 2021, and Frank Perea in 2023. Wick named Heather Mayer as publisher in 2024. Wick sold the Herald to Forum in 2026.
