= Brent Qvale =

American football player (born 1991)

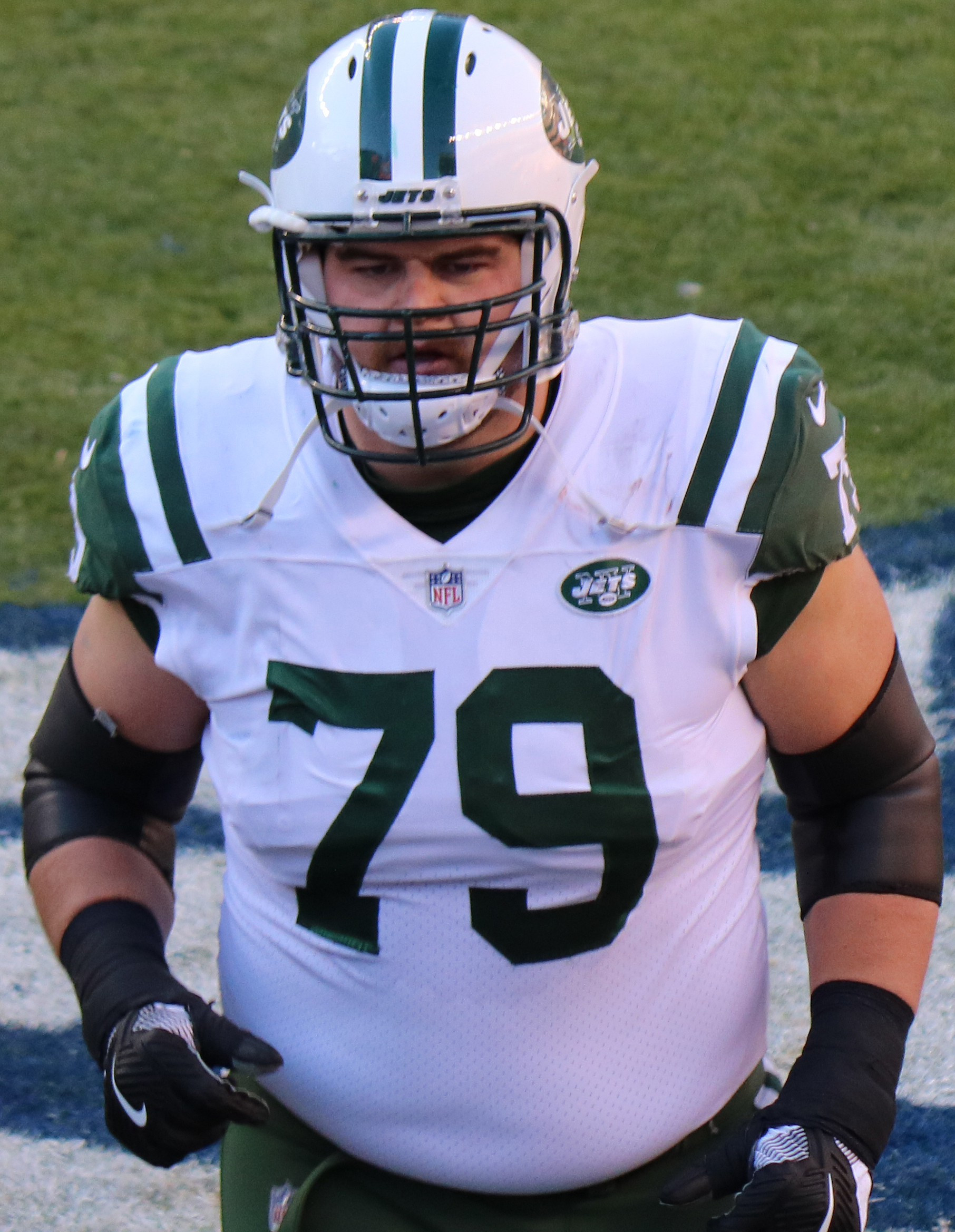
- Qvale with the New York Jets in the 2017

No. 79, 76
- Position: Offensive tackle

Personal information
- Born: March 11, 1991 (age 35); Williston, North Dakota, U.S.
- Listed height: 6 ft 7 in (2.01 m)
- Listed weight: 315 lb (143 kg)

Career information
- High school: Williston
- College: Nebraska
- NFL draft: 2014: undrafted

Career history
- New York Jets (2014−2019); Houston Texans (2020); Tennessee Titans (2021)*
- * Offseason or practice squad member only

Career NFL statistics
- Games played: 77
- Games started: 18
- Stats at Pro Football Reference

Brent Qvale (/ˈkwɑːliː/ KWAH-lee; born March 11, 1991) is an American former professional football player who was an offensive tackle in the National Football League (NFL). He played college football for the Nebraska Cornhuskers and was signed by the New York Jets as an undrafted free agent in 2014.

== Early life ==
Qvale attended Williston High School in Williston, North Dakota. Qvale played American football and basketball for Williston, and finished in second place in voting for North Dakota Mr. Basketball in 2009.

== College career ==
Qvale enrolled at the University of Nebraska–Lincoln, where he played college football for the Nebraska Cornhuskers. As a result of a shoulder injury, he redshirted in his first year at Nebraska. He served as a reserve at offensive guard in 2010 and 2011. In 2012, after two years as a reserve, Qvale succeeded Tyler Moore as the Cornhuskers' starting left tackle. Qvale played in 53 games for the Cornhuskers, with 18 games started. He was not selected in the 2014 NFL draft.

== Professional career ==
=== New York Jets ===
Qvale had a try-out with the New York Jets in training camp and was subsequently signed. He suffered a concussion that limited his playing time and did not make the final roster. He was added to the Jets' practice squad at the end of training camp. Qvale signed a reserve/future contract with the team on December 30, 2014.

In 2015, the Jets had Qvale try out for the team at guard. Qvale made the Jets' 53-man active roster at the start of the 2015 season.

On March 19, 2019, Qvale re-signed with the Jets. He was placed on injured reserve on September 2, 2019, with a knee injury. He was designated for return from injured reserve on November 27, 2019, and began practicing with the team again. He was activated on December 12, 2019.

=== Houston Texans ===
On April 14, 2020, Qvale signed a one-year contract with the Houston Texans. He was released during final roster cuts on September 5, but re-signed with the team two days later. On January 2, 2021, Qvale was placed on injured reserve. He started his last three games at left guard.

=== Tennessee Titans ===
On August 5, 2021, Qvale signed with the Tennessee Titans. He was placed on injured reserve on August 19, 2021. Qvale was released with an injury settlement on August 31.

== Personal life ==
While at Nebraska, Qvale obtained a master's degree in applied science. He became certified as a strength and conditioning coach by the Collegiate Strength and Conditioning Coaches Association.

Qvale married Melisa McDonald, a fellow Nebraska alumni, in 2015. Brent's older brother, Brian Qvale, is a professional basketball player. Their father, Sanford, played offensive tackle at North Dakota State University.
