= U.S. Route 85B (Williams County, North Dakota) =

Auxiliary highway route in North Dakota, United States

U.S. Highway 85B

Route information
- Auxiliary route of US 85
- Maintained by NDDOT
- Length: 8.97 mi (14.44 km)
- Existed: 2015–present

Major junctions
- North end: US 2 / US 85 in Williston
- CR 6 / CR 9 in Pherrin Township; CR 7B in Pherrin Township
- South end: ND 1804 / CR 9 in Williston

Location
- Country: United States
- State: North Dakota
- Counties: Williams

Highway system
- United States Numbered Highway System; List; Special; Divided; North Dakota State Highway System; Interstate; US; State

U.S. Route 85B (US 85B) is an approximately nine-mile-long (14 km) temporary auxiliary route of US 85 located entirely within Williams County in the state of North Dakota. The highway serves as an eastern bypass around the city of Williston. The establishment of the route was a temporary solution to the rapid increase in truck traffic in the area due to the North Dakota oil boom. The county plans on eventually replacing the highway with an expressway bypass, dubbed the "Northeastern Truck Reliever Route", once funding is gathered. US 85 already bypasses the city as an expressway to the west.

== Route description ==
Starting at a T intersection with North Dakota Highway 1804 within Williston's city limits, United States Route 85B travels north for just under half a mile (0.80 km) before curving east for about a third of a mile (4.8 km) and turning north. It runs about three miles to intersect with 54th Street Northwest that marks the eastern terminus of County Road 7B. After this it continues north for three more miles. Here, County Road 6 joins it and they run concurrently west for two miles to US Route 85B's terminus at its intersection with United States Route 2 in Williston's city limits. The highway runs roughly parallel to the Little Muddy River for most of its length.

== Major intersections ==
The entire route is in Williams County.

Location	mi	km	Destinations	Notes
Williston	0.00	0.00	ND 1804 / CR 9 south (Broadway)	Southern terminus of US 85B; southern end of CR 9 concurrency
Pherrin Township	6.92	11.14	CR 6 east / CR 9 north (57th Street NW east) – Youth Camp	Southern end of CR 6 concurrency; northern end of CR 9 concurrency
Missouri Ridge Township	8.97	14.44	US 2 / US 85 / CR 6 ends – Williston, Minot	Northern termini of US 85B and CR 6; northern end of CR 6 concurrency; highway continues south as US 85 to Williston Basin International Airport
1.000 mi = 1.609 km; 1.000 km = 0.621 mi: Concurrency terminus
