= Corey Johnson (North Dakota politician) =

American politician

Member-elect of the North Dakota House of Representatives from the 23rd district
- Assuming office December 2026
- Succeeding: Nico Rios

Personal details
- Party: Republican

Corey Johnson is an American politician. A member of the Republican Party, he is the member-elect for the 23rd district of the North Dakota House of Representatives.
