= Williston Public School District =

School district in North Dakota, United States

The Williston Public School District #1 was a school district serving Williston, North Dakota.

While most of the district was in Williams County, where it served almost all of Williston, a section was in McKenzie County.

== History ==
In 2020 a vote was held on whether it was to merge with the Williams County Public School District 8 (formerly New Public School District 8) to form a new district. 86.6% of the District 1 voters approved, as did 59.6% of the District 8 voters. The no percentages were 13.4% for District 1 and 40.4% for District 8.

In 2021 it merged with the Williams County Public School District 8 to form the Williston Basin School District 7.

== Schools ==
Elementary schools

- Bakken Elementary School
- Hagan Elementary School
- Lewis & Clark Elementary School
- Rickard Elementary School
- Wilkinson Elementary School

Secondary schools

- Williston Middle School
- Williston High School
