= Scott Dyk =

American politician

Member of the North Dakota House of Representatives from the 23rd district
- In office December 1, 2022 – April 7, 2024
- Succeeded by: Dennis Nehring

Personal details
- Party: Republican

Scott Dyk is an American politician who served as a member of the North Dakota House of Representatives from the 23rd district, alongside Nico Rios.

Dyk resigned from the North Dakota House in April 2024 due to health issues in his family.
