= Creaser Building =

- U.S. National Register of Historic Places
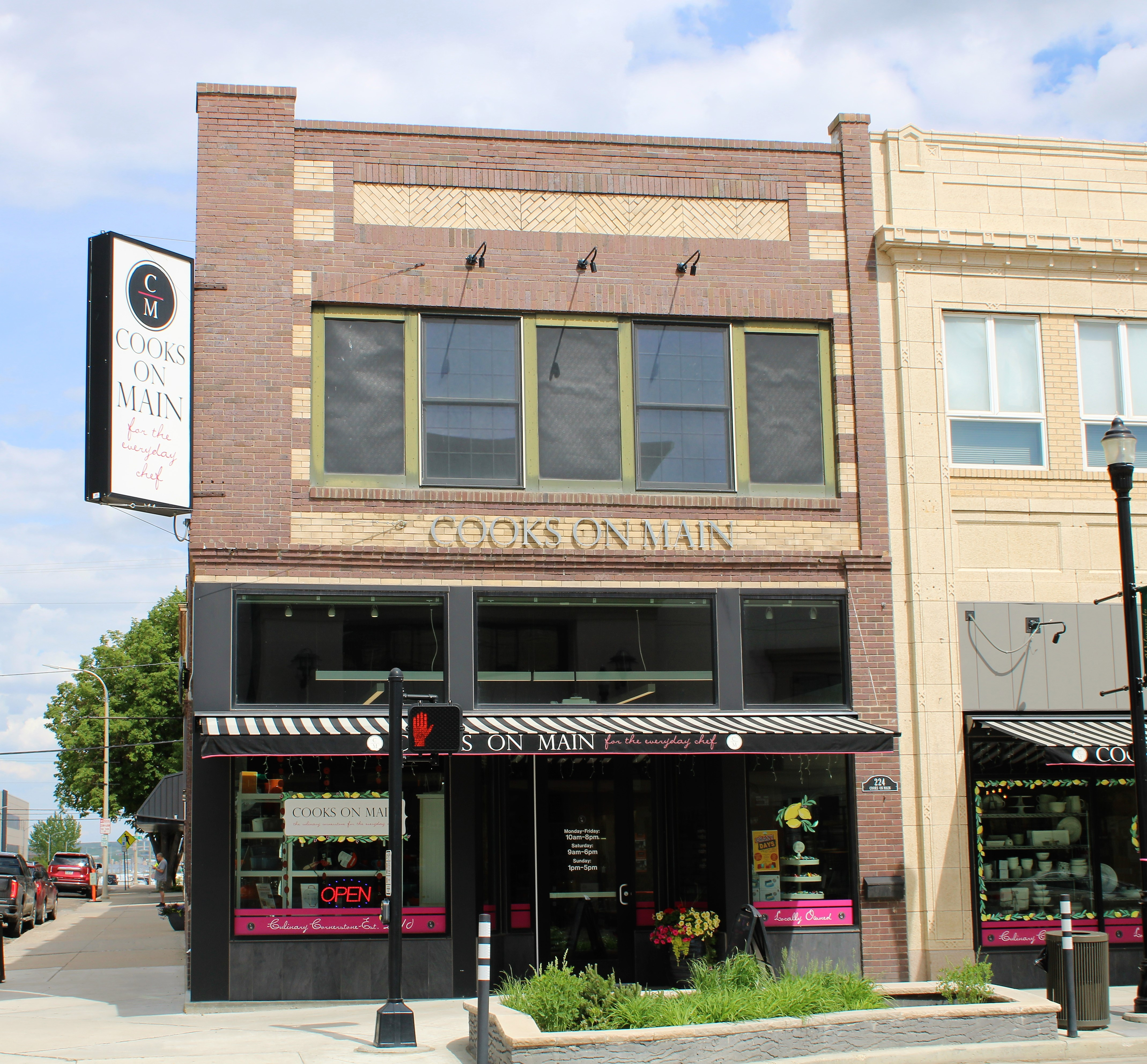

- Location within North Dakota Location within the United States
- Location: 224 Main St. Williston, North Dakota
- Coordinates: 48.146408°N 103.621472°W
- Area: less than one acre
- Architectural style: Early Commercial
- NRHP reference No.: 16000442
- Added to NRHP: July 11, 2016

The Creaser Building, at 224 Main St. in Williston in Williams County, North Dakota, was listed on the National Register of Historic Places in 2016.

It was built during 1915-16 by the First National Bank, and it became known as the Creaser Building as its first floor was occupied by the Creaser Drug Store from 1915 to 1940. Its National Register application asserts it is "an excellent example of early 20th century commercial style." It has also been known as Cooks on Main, as Judy's Cupboard, as Colonial Shop, as JB Lyon Women's Wear Clothing, and as First National Building.

It is a two-story brick and glass building on a full concrete basement on a corner lot. It is 96.5 by 24 feet (29.4 m × 7.3 m) in plan with storefronts along the full east-west and north-south facades, with rentable space above. Its first floor has a 14 feet (4.3 m)-high wood grid ceiling.

The building's most distinctive feature is its contrasting dark red and blond running bond brickwork.
