= KGCX =

Radio station in Sidney, Montana

- Sidney, Montana; United States
- Broadcast area: Sidney-Williston
- Frequency: 93.1 MHz
- Branding: Eagle 93

Programming
- Format: Classic rock
- Affiliations: Fox News Radio

Ownership
- Owner: Andrew Sturlaugson; (P&A Media LLC)
- Sister stations: KDSR, KXWI

History
- First air date: June 1, 2004; 21 years ago
- Call sign meaning: Formerly used on 1480 AM

Technical information
- Licensing authority: FCC
- Facility ID: 84342
- Class: C1
- ERP: 100,000 watts
- HAAT: 110.1 meters (361 ft)
- Transmitter coordinates: 47°51′51″N 103°57′27″W

Links
- Public license information: Public file; LMS
- Webcast: Listen live
- Website: web.kgcxradio.com

KGCX (93.1 FM, "Eagle 93") is a radio station licensed to serve Sidney, Montana. The station is owned by Andrew Sturlaugson's P&A Media. It airs a classic rock music format. The KGCX studios are on 2nd Ave SW in Sidney.

== History ==
The station was assigned the KGCX call letters by the Federal Communications Commission on February 3, 2004; it signed on June 1.

Founding owner Stephen Marks died on May 11, 2022; the station had been owned by his Sidney Community Broadcasting. Andrew Sturlaugson's P&A Media acquired Marks' Montana and North Dakota radio stations, including KGCX, for $850,000 in 2024.
