= Old Armory (Williston, North Dakota) =

- U.S. National Register of Historic Places
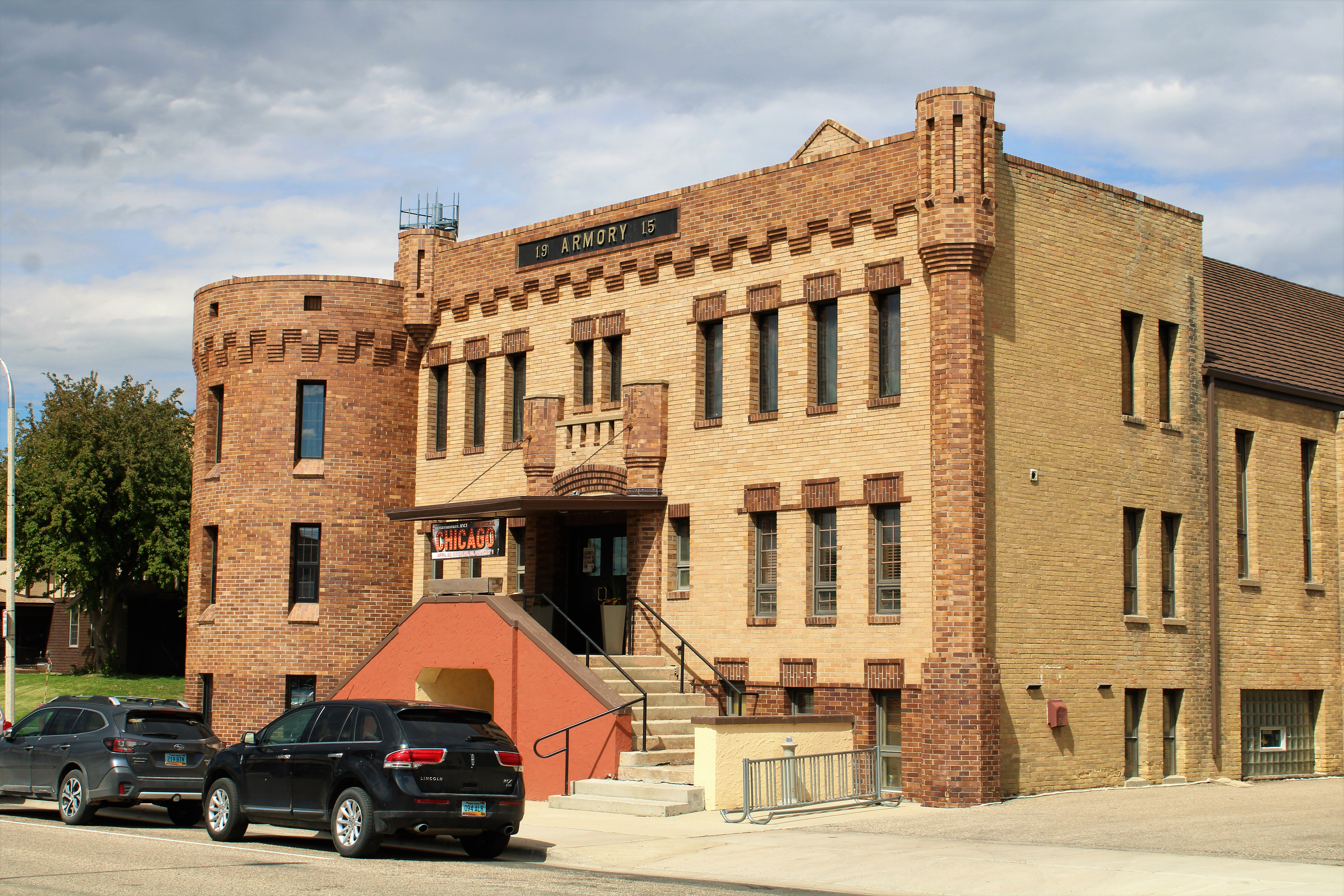

- Location within North Dakota Location within the United States
- Location: 320 1st Ave., E. Williston, North Dakota
- Coordinates: 48°8′51″N 103°37′10″W
- Area: 0.4 acres (0.16 ha)
- Built: 1915
- Built by: J.G. Harding
- Architect: Stacy-Judd, Robert
- NRHP reference No.: 85000787
- Added to NRHP: April 11, 1985

The Old Armory on 1st Ave., E., in Williston, North Dakota, was built in 1915. For its historical and architectural significance, it was listed on the National Register of Historic Places in 1985.

According to its NRHP nomination, the building's significance rests on two factors:

The Old Armory brought together diverse sectors of the public in its creation and subsequent use: local government, military, private business, and the general townspeople. In architectural character it is uncommon, yet representative of a once popular type of design for armory buildings in the state.

Although designed by Robert Stacy-Judd, a distinguished architect, his prominence is not noted in the NRHP nomination. In 2012, the local community planned various historically sensitive renovations and fundraising to support the work.
