= KYYZ =

- Williston, North Dakota; United States
- Broadcast area: Williston-Sidney
- Frequency: 96.1 MHz
- Branding: Dakota Country 96.1

Programming
- Format: Country
- Affiliations: Premiere Networks

Ownership
- Owner: Townsquare Media; (Townsquare License, LLC)
- Sister stations: KEYZ, KTHC

History
- First air date: 1980
- Former call signs: KLAN (1980)

Technical information
- Licensing authority: FCC
- Facility ID: 10510
- Class: C1
- ERP: 100,000 watts
- HAAT: 265.0 meters
- Transmitter coordinates: 48°2′52″N 103°59′1″W

Links
- Public license information: Public file; LMS
- Webcast: Listen Live
- Website: dakotacountry.net

KYYZ (96.1 FM) is a radio station licensed to Williston, North Dakota. It broadcasts a country music format. The station was first licensed as KLAN on April 1, 1980.

It also has two sister stations, KEYZ and KTHC. All three stations are owned by Townsquare Media, and are located at 410 6th Street East, on Williston's east side.

Previous logo
