= KDSR =

Radio station in Williston, North Dakota

- Williston, North Dakota; United States
- Broadcast area: Williston-Sidney
- Frequency: 101.1 MHz
- Branding: 101.1 Jack FM

Programming
- Format: Adult hits
- Affiliations: Jack FM network

Ownership
- Owner: Andrew Sturlaugson; (P&A Media LLC)
- Sister stations: KGCX, KXWI

History
- First air date: February 28, 1985

Technical information
- Licensing authority: FCC
- Facility ID: 56970
- Class: C1
- ERP: 100,000 watts
- HAAT: 244 meters (801 ft)
- Transmitter coordinates: 48°3′30″N 104°0′0″W

Links
- Public license information: Public file; LMS
- Webcast: Listen live
- Website: web.kdsrradio.com/kdsr-101-1/

KDSR (101.1 FM, "101.1 Jack FM") is a Class C1 radio station licensed to serve Williston, North Dakota. The station is owned by Andrew Sturlaugson, and licensed to P&A Media LLC. It airs an adult hits music format. The station studios are on E Broadway in Williston.

== History ==
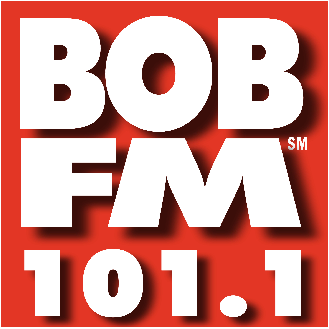
Former Bob FM logo

The station was assigned the KDSR call letters by the Federal Communications Commission on August 30, 1984. It signed on February 28, 1985.

KDSR was owned by Stephen Marks from 2002, when his Williston Community Broadcasting bought it for $500,000 from Robert H. Miller, until his death on May 11, 2022. Andrew Sturlaugson's P&A Media acquired Marks' Montana and North Dakota radio stations, including KDSR, for $850,000 in 2024.
