= Williston Basin School District 7 =

School district in North Dakota, United States

Address
- 111 7th Avenue West Williston, North Dakota, 58801; United States

District information
- Type: Public
- NCES District ID: 3800405

Other information
- Website: www.willistonschools.org

Williston Basin School District 7 (WBSD7) is a school district headquartered in Williston, North Dakota.

== History ==
In 2020 a vote was held on whether it was to merge the Williston School District 1 with the Williams County Public School District 8 to form a new district. The respective votes in each district were 2,527 in District 1 (86.6%) and 541 (59.6%) in District 8, while the no votes were 391 (13.4%) in District 1 and 367 (40.4%) in District 8.

All members of the North Dakota State Board of Public School Education approved the merger plans.

Effective July 1, 2021, the districts officially merged.

== Schools ==
High schools

- Williston High School
- Del Easton Alternative High School

Williston Middle School Central Campus

- Bakken Ridge (Grade 5)
- Coyote Center (Middle School) (Grades 6-8)
- ASB Exploratory Center (Formerly ASB Innovation Academy)

Elementary Schools

- Garden Valley Elementary School (through Grade 5)
- Hagan Elementary School
- Lewis and Clark Elementary School
- McVay Elementary School
- Missouri Ridge Elementary School (through Grade 5) - It was a grade 3-8 school prior to 2023. Since 2023 it has been an elementary school. Bakken Ridge School, Williston Middle School, and the Innovation Academy took students of other grade levels.
- Rickard Elementary School
- Sloulin Elementary School Opening in 2026
- Wilkinson Elementary School

Former schools

- Round Prairie Elementary School - In 2022, the enrollment was 39. It was scheduled to close in 2023.
