= KTHC =

Radio station in Sidney, Montana

- Sidney, Montana; United States
- Broadcast area: Sidney-Williston
- Frequency: 95.1 MHz
- Branding: Mix 95.1

Programming
- Format: Hot adult contemporary
- Affiliations: Premiere Networks; Westwood One

Ownership
- Owner: Townsquare Media; (Townsquare License, LLC)
- Sister stations: KEYZ; KYYZ

History
- First air date: December 1996

Technical information
- Licensing authority: FCC
- Facility ID: 10513
- Class: C1
- ERP: 100,000 watts
- HAAT: 219 meters (719 feet)
- Transmitter coordinates: 48°02′52″N 103°59′01″W

Links
- Public license information: Public file; LMS
- Webcast: Listen Live
- Website: mix951.com

KTHC (95.1 FM) is a radio station licensed to Sidney, Montana, and serving northeast Montana and northwest North Dakota including the cities of Sidney, Montana and Williston, North Dakota. The station, also known as "Mix 95.1", has a 24-hour hot adult contemporary format.

It also has two sister stations, KEYZ and KYYZ. All three stations are owned by Townsquare Media, and are located at 410 6th Street East, on Williston's east side.

On September 25, 2023, KTHC changed its format from top 40/CHR to hot adult contemporary, branded as "Mix 95.1".
