= Sidney, Montana =

City in Montana, United States

- City
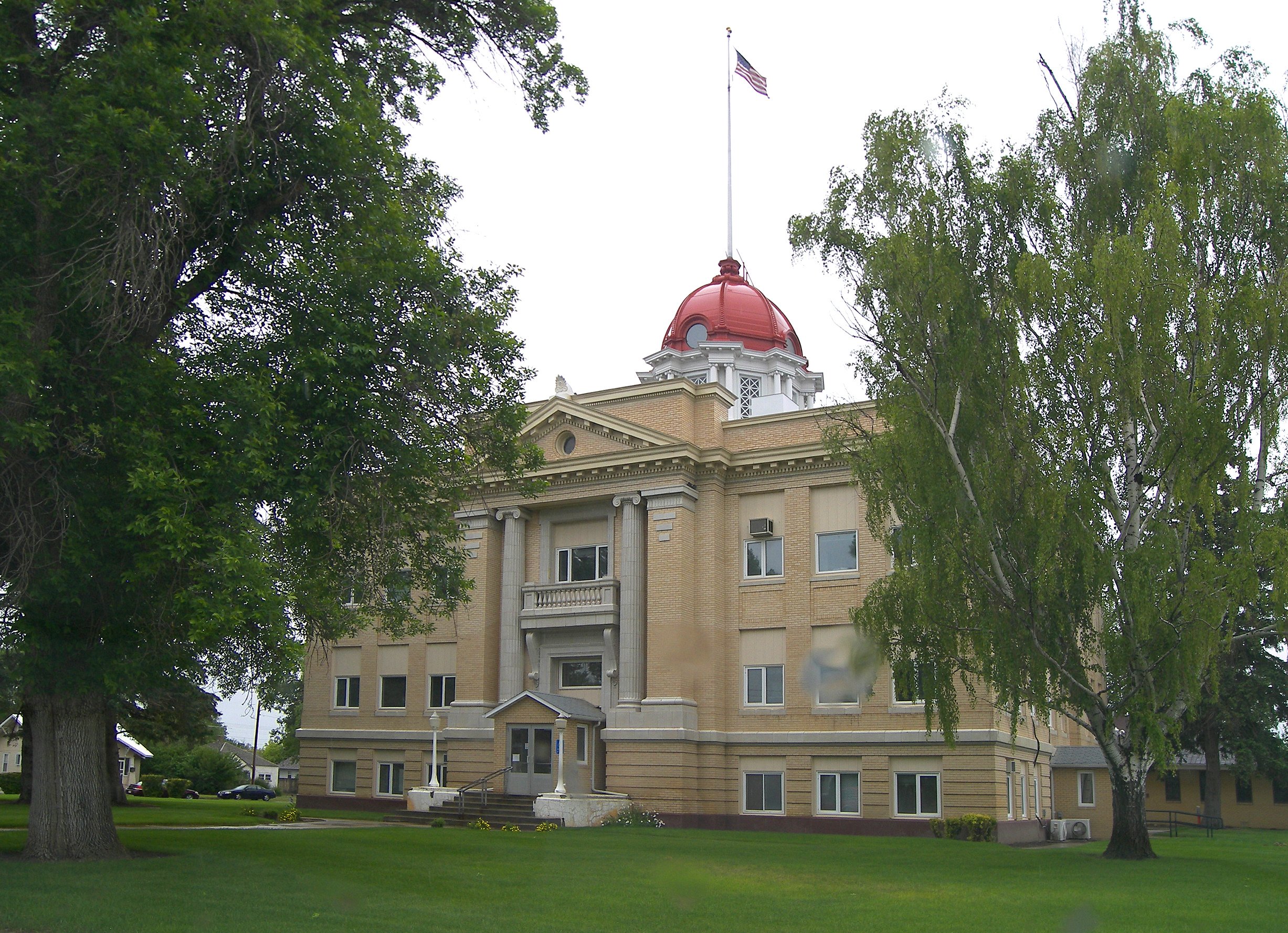
- The Richland County Courthouse in Sidney
- Nickname: Sunrise City
- Location of Sidney, Montana
- Coordinates: 47.715456°N 104.167161°W
- Country: United States
- State: Montana
- County: Richland
- Founded: 1888
- Incorporated: 1911
- Founder: Sidney Walters

Government
  - Mayor: Rick Norby
  - City Council: W1: Ken Koffler & Jamie Larson; W2: Kysa Rasmussen & Kali Godfrey; W3: Frank DiFonzo & Tami Christensen

Area
  - City: 3.306 sq mi (8.563 km^{2})
  - Land: 3.287 sq mi (8.514 km^{2})
  - Water: 0.019 sq mi (0.049 km^{2}) 0.57%
- Elevation: 1,949 ft (594 m)

Population (2020)
  - City: 6,346
  - Estimate (2024): 6,031
  - Density: 1,834.5/sq mi (708.29/km^{2})
  - Urban: 6,522
  - Metro: 11,028
- Time zone: UTC–7 (Mountain (MST))
  - Summer (DST): UTC–6 (MDT)
- ZIP Code: 59270
- Area code: 406
- FIPS code: 30-67900
- GNIS feature ID: 2411896
- Website: cityofsidneymt.com

Sidney is a city in and the county seat of Richland County, Montana, United States, less than 10 mi (16 km) west of the North Dakota border. The population was 6,346 at the 2020 census, and was estimated to be 6,031 in 2024. The city lies along the Yellowstone River. Sidney is approximately midway between Glendive, Montana and Williston, North Dakota.

== History ==
Settlers began arriving in the area in the 1870s, and a post office was established in 1888. Six-year-old Sidney Walters and his parents were staying with Hiram Otis, the local justice of the peace, and Otis decided that Sidney was a good name for the town. The following year, Montana became a state and Sidney was incorporated in 1911.

Sidney was originally part of Dawson County, but became the county seat of Richland County at its inception in 1914.

Agriculture became an important part of the region after the Lower Yellowstone Irrigation Project was completed in 1909. A dam was built on the river south of Glendive, which diverted water from the river into a 115.2 km (71.6 mi) main canal, which runs north–south, parallel to the Yellowstone, irrigating land from Glendive north up to Fairview, where it drains into the Missouri River. This project irrigates 51,429 acres (208.13 km^{2}) and serves water to 450 farms, according to the manager of the Lower Yellowstone Irrigation Districts.

During the Great Depression, Montana artist J. K. Ralston painted a Federal Arts Project mural at the Richland County Courthouse in Sidney.

The town received a boost in 1924 when the Holly Sugar Corporation opened up a sugar refinery in Sidney to process locally grown sugar beets.

The area experienced an oil boom and bust in the late 1970s and early 1980s, bringing an influx of people to the town for a short period of time. Around the start of the 21st century, the town experienced another surge in oil exploration activity.

== Geography ==
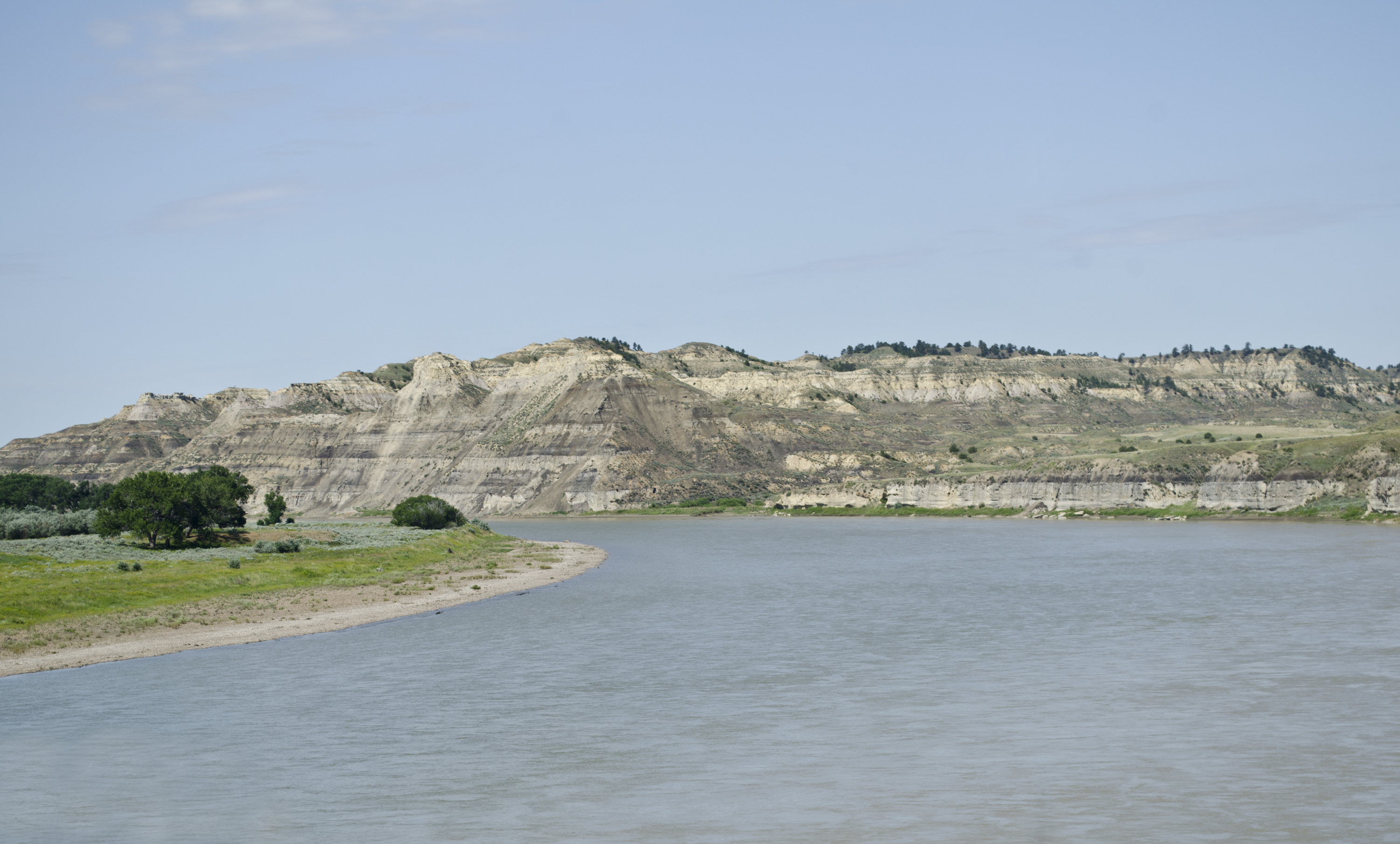
Yellowstone River near Sidney

Sidney is located in the northeastern part of the state.

According to the United States Census Bureau, the city has a total area of 3.306 square miles (8.56 km^{2}), of which 3.287 square miles (8.51 km^{2}) is land and 0.019 square miles (0.05 km^{2}) (0.57%) is water.

Sidney is 270 miles (430 km) northeast of Billings, and 190 miles (310 km) south of Regina, Saskatchewan.

=== Climate ===
Sidney experiences a semi-arid climate (Köppen BSk) with long, cold, dry winters and hot, more humid summers.

Climate data for Sidney, Montana, 1991–2020 normals, extremes 1910–present
Month	Jan	Feb	Mar	Apr	May	Jun	Jul	Aug	Sep	Oct	Nov	Dec	Year
Record high °F (°C)	61 (16)	68 (20)	81 (27)	95 (35)	102 (39)	105 (41)	110 (43)	107 (42)	101 (38)	93 (34)	77 (25)	68 (20)	110 (43)
Mean maximum °F (°C)	48.1 (8.9)	51.2 (10.7)	68.2 (20.1)	80.8 (27.1)	87.8 (31.0)	93.1 (33.9)	97.5 (36.4)	97.3 (36.3)	93.5 (34.2)	80.1 (26.7)	61.1 (16.2)	50.3 (10.2)	99.6 (37.6)
Mean daily maximum °F (°C)	27.2 (−2.7)	32.0 (0.0)	45.8 (7.7)	60.5 (15.8)	71.3 (21.8)	79.1 (26.2)	86.6 (30.3)	86.4 (30.2)	75.8 (24.3)	59.4 (15.2)	41.9 (5.5)	30.6 (−0.8)	58.0 (14.5)
Daily mean °F (°C)	16.9 (−8.4)	21.3 (−5.9)	33.4 (0.8)	46.1 (7.8)	57.0 (13.9)	65.7 (18.7)	72.0 (22.2)	70.8 (21.6)	60.6 (15.9)	46.5 (8.1)	31.6 (−0.2)	20.6 (−6.3)	45.2 (7.3)
Mean daily minimum °F (°C)	6.5 (−14.2)	10.6 (−11.9)	21.0 (−6.1)	31.8 (−0.1)	42.7 (5.9)	52.3 (11.3)	57.3 (14.1)	55.1 (12.8)	45.5 (7.5)	33.6 (0.9)	21.2 (−6.0)	10.7 (−11.8)	32.4 (0.2)
Mean minimum °F (°C)	−21.7 (−29.8)	−14.2 (−25.7)	−4.7 (−20.4)	15.0 (−9.4)	27.0 (−2.8)	39.7 (4.3)	46.9 (8.3)	42.6 (5.9)	30.7 (−0.7)	15.3 (−9.3)	0.0 (−17.8)	−15.6 (−26.4)	−26.3 (−32.4)
Record low °F (°C)	−68 (−56)	−44 (−42)	−29 (−34)	−17 (−27)	16 (−9)	28 (−2)	35 (2)	30 (−1)	15 (−9)	−7 (−22)	−24 (−31)	−40 (−40)	−68 (−56)
Average precipitation inches (mm)	0.45 (11)	0.37 (9.4)	0.58 (15)	1.17 (30)	2.40 (61)	2.78 (71)	2.65 (67)	1.30 (33)	1.62 (41)	1.08 (27)	0.59 (15)	0.51 (13)	15.50 (394)
Average snowfall inches (cm)	7.0 (18)	5.6 (14)	3.0 (7.6)	1.7 (4.3)	0.7 (1.8)	0.0 (0.0)	0.0 (0.0)	0.0 (0.0)	0.0 (0.0)	1.5 (3.8)	3.0 (7.6)	7.9 (20)	30.4 (77.1)
Average extreme snow depth inches (cm)	9.0 (23)	7.9 (20)	6.4 (16)	0.8 (2.0)	0.3 (0.76)	0.0 (0.0)	0.0 (0.0)	0.0 (0.0)	0.0 (0.0)	1.6 (4.1)	3.4 (8.6)	6.4 (16)	11.9 (30)
Average precipitation days (≥ 0.01 in)	6.5	4.7	5.6	6.4	10.4	11.3	8.5	6.8	6.7	6.7	5.2	5.7	84.5
Average snowy days (≥ 0.1 in)	5.5	4.8	3.2	0.9	0.2	0.0	0.0	0.0	0.0	0.7	2.7	5.6	23.6
Source 1: NOAA
Source 2: National Weather Service

== Economy ==
Sidney's economy relies heavily on farming, ranching, and oil production; thus, the surrounding countryside is populated with farms, cattle ranches, and oil/gas extraction sites.

From 1925 to 2023, Sidney was home to a sugar beet factory, the largest employer in the city next to the Sidney Health Center and Sidney Public Schools. The sugar beet factory closed in April 2023.

== Arts and culture ==
The town's museum, the MonDak Heritage Center, was founded in 1967. The museum houses artifacts and archives that detail the history of life in eastern Montana and western North Dakota since the first pioneers arrived in the late 19th century.

Sidney has a public library, the Sidney-Richland County Library.

== Government ==
The town of Sidney has a Mayor and City Council. The City Council has 3 wards, each with 2 councilors. Rick Norby became mayor in 2014. He was unopposed in the November 2025 election.

== Education ==
Sidney has four public schools; one K, 1st, and 2nd grade (Westside Elementary) elementary school, a 3rd, 4th and 5th grade (Central Elementary) Elementary school, a 6-8 Junior High School, and a 9-12 senior high school. Sidney High School's team name is the Eagles.

There are no institutions of higher education located within the city, but Williston State College in North Dakota is within commuting distance. MSU-Billings offers courses through distance education, and Sidney High School has a variety of adult education classes each year.

== Media ==
The city has two community newspapers, The Sidney Herald and The Roundup.

=== Radio ===
- KEYZ AM 660
- KGCX FM 93.1
- KTHC FM 95.1
- KYYZ FM 96.1
- KDSR FM 101.1

== Infrastructure ==
The eastern end of Montana Highway 16 joins Highway 200 in Sidney.

The town is served by Sidney-Richland Municipal Airport, located one mile (1.6 km) west of the central business district. It has scheduled passenger commuter airline flights through Cape Air.

== Demographics ==
Historical population
Census	Pop.	Note	%±
1900	75		—
1910	345		360.0%
1920	1,400		305.8%
1930	2,010		43.6%
1940	2,978		48.2%
1950	3,987		33.9%
1960	4,564		14.5%
1970	4,543		−0.5%
1980	5,726		26.0%
1990	5,216		−8.9%
2000	4,774		−8.5%
2010	5,191		8.7%
2020	6,346		22.3%
2024 (est.)	6,031		−5.0%
source: U.S. Decennial Census; 2020 Census

As of the 2023 American Community Survey, there are 2,602 estimated households in Sidney with an average of 2.38 persons per household. The city has a median household income of $62,992. Approximately 8.6% of the city's population lives at or below the poverty line. Sidney has an estimated 72.3% employment rate, with 18.9% of the population holding a bachelor's degree or higher and 96.0% holding a high school diploma.

The top five reported ancestries (people were allowed to report up to two ancestries, thus the figures will generally add to more than 100%) were English (95.9%), Spanish (2.4%), Indo-European (0.7%), Asian and Pacific Islander (1.0%), and Other (0.0%).

=== Racial and ethnic composition ===
Sidney, Montana – racial and ethnic composition Note: the US Census treats Hispanic/Latino as an ethnic category. This table excludes Latinos from the racial categories and assigns them to a separate category. Hispanics/Latinos may be of any race.
Race / ethnicity (NH = non-Hispanic)	Pop. 2000	Pop. 2010	Pop. 2020	% 2000	% 2010	% 2020
White alone (NH)	4,511	4,815	5,256	94.49%	92.76%	82.82%
Black or African American alone (NH)	5	2	43	0.10%	0.04%	0.68%
Native American or Alaska Native alone (NH)	88	91	116	1.84%	1.75%	1.83%
Asian alone (NH)	15	20	96	0.31%	0.39%	1.51%
Pacific Islander alone (NH)	0	0	4	0.00%	0.00%	0.06%
Other race alone (NH)	0	0	23	0.00%	0.00%	0.36%
Mixed race or multiracial (NH)	39	84	387	0.82%	1.62%	6.10%
Hispanic or Latino (any race)	116	179	421	2.43%	3.45%	6.63%
Total	4,774	5,191	6,346	100.00%	100.00%	100.00%

=== 2020 census ===
As of the 2020 census, there were 6,346 people, 2,720 households, and 1,596 families residing in the city. The median age was 36.7 years. 24.6% of residents were under the age of 18 and 14.5% were 65 years of age or older. For every 100 females, there were 101.5 males; for every 100 females age 18 and over, there were 102.1 males age 18 and over.

99.2% of residents lived in urban areas, while 0.8% lived in rural areas.

There were 2,720 households, of which 30.9% had children under the age of 18 living in them. Of all households, 43.5% were married-couple households, 23.5% were households with a male householder and no spouse or partner present, and 24.7% were households with a female householder and no spouse or partner present. About 33.8% of all households were made up of individuals, and 11.2% had someone living alone who was 65 years of age or older.

There were 3,087 housing units, of which 11.9% were vacant. The homeowner vacancy rate was 2.3% and the rental vacancy rate was 12.7%. The population density was 1,931.81 inhabitants per square mile (745.9/km^{2}), and the housing-unit density was 939.15 per square mile (362.6/km^{2}).

=== 2010 census ===
As of the 2010 census, there were 5,191 people, 2,304 households, and 1,378 families residing in the city. The population density was 1,951.7 inhabitants per square mile (753.6/km^{2}). There were 2,467 housing units at an average density of 927.4 per square mile (358.1/km^{2}). The racial makeup of the city was 94.88% White, 0.06% African American, 1.83% Native American, 0.39% Asian, 0.00% Pacific Islander, 0.67% from some other races and 2.18% from two or more races. Hispanic or Latino people of any race were 3.45% of the population.

There were 2,304 households, of which 28.5% had children under the age of 18 living with them, 46.0% were married couples living together, 8.6% had a female householder with no husband present, 5.2% had a male householder with no wife present, and 40.2% were non-families. 33.7% of all households were made up of individuals, and 12.9% had someone living alone who was 65 years of age or older. The average household size was 2.24 and the average family size was 2.85.

The median age in the city was 39.3 years. 23.3% of residents were under the age of 18; 8.2% were between the ages of 18 and 24; 24.7% were from 25 to 44; 29% were from 45 to 64; and 14.8% were 65 years of age or older. The gender makeup of the city was 50.6% male and 49.4% female.

=== 2000 census ===
As of the 2000 census, there were 4,774 people, 2,006 households, and 1,271 families residing in the city. The population density was 2,125.3 inhabitants per square mile (820.6/km^{2}). There were 2,393 housing units at an average density of 1,065.3 per square mile (411.3/km^{2}). The racial makeup of the city was 95.81% White, 0.10% African American, 1.89% Native American, 0.31% Asian, 0.00% Pacific Islander, 1.01% from some other races and 0.88% from two or more races. Hispanic or Latino people of any race were 2.43% of the population.

There were 2,006 households, out of which 31.8% had children under the age of 18 living with them, 49.8% were married couples living together, 9.9% had a female householder with no husband present, and 36.6% were non-families. 33.0% of all households were made up of individuals, and 15.3% had someone living alone who was 65 years of age or older. The average household size was 2.33 and the average family size was 2.98.

In the city, the population was spread out, with 26.7% under the age of 18, 7.1% from 18 to 24, 26.6% from 25 to 44, 21.8% from 45 to 64, and 18.0% who were 65 years of age or older. The median age was 39 years. For every 100 females there were 92.3 males. For every 100 females age 18 and over, there were 85.8 males.

The median income for a household in the city was $32,109, and the median income for a family was $38,992. Males had a median income of $30,347 versus $18,517 for females. The per capita income for the city was $16,911. About 8.5% of families and 12.7% of the population were below the poverty line, including 17.1% of those under age 18 and 8.7% of those age 65 or over.

== Notable people ==
- Clyde Lamb — gag cartoonist and syndicated comic strip artist, born in Sidney
- Roger A. Markle — director of the U.S. Bureau of Mines and executive of Quaker State and NERCO, born in Sidney
- Donald Nutter — former Governor of Montana (1961–62), grew up in Sidney
- Barry Petersen — Emmy Award-winning CBS News correspondent, graduated from Sidney High School in 1966
- Chuck Stevenson — race car driver, born in Sidney
