= Charles L. Scofield =

American politician (1925–2024)

Member of the North Dakota House of Representatives from the 1st district
- In office 1973–1980

Personal details
- Born: February 18, 1925 Miles City, Montana, U.S.
- Died: November 22, 2024 (aged 99) Billings, Montana, U.S.
- Party: Republican

Charles Leo Scofield (February 15, 1925 – November 22, 2024) was an American politician who was a member of the North Dakota House of Representatives. He represented the 1st district in the North Dakota House of Representatives from 1973 to 1980, as a Republican. He was president of the North Dakota Broadcasters Association, the Williston Chamber of Commerce, and Williston Kiwanis Club.

Scofield died on November 22, 2024, at the age of 99.
