= Williston, North Dakota =

- City
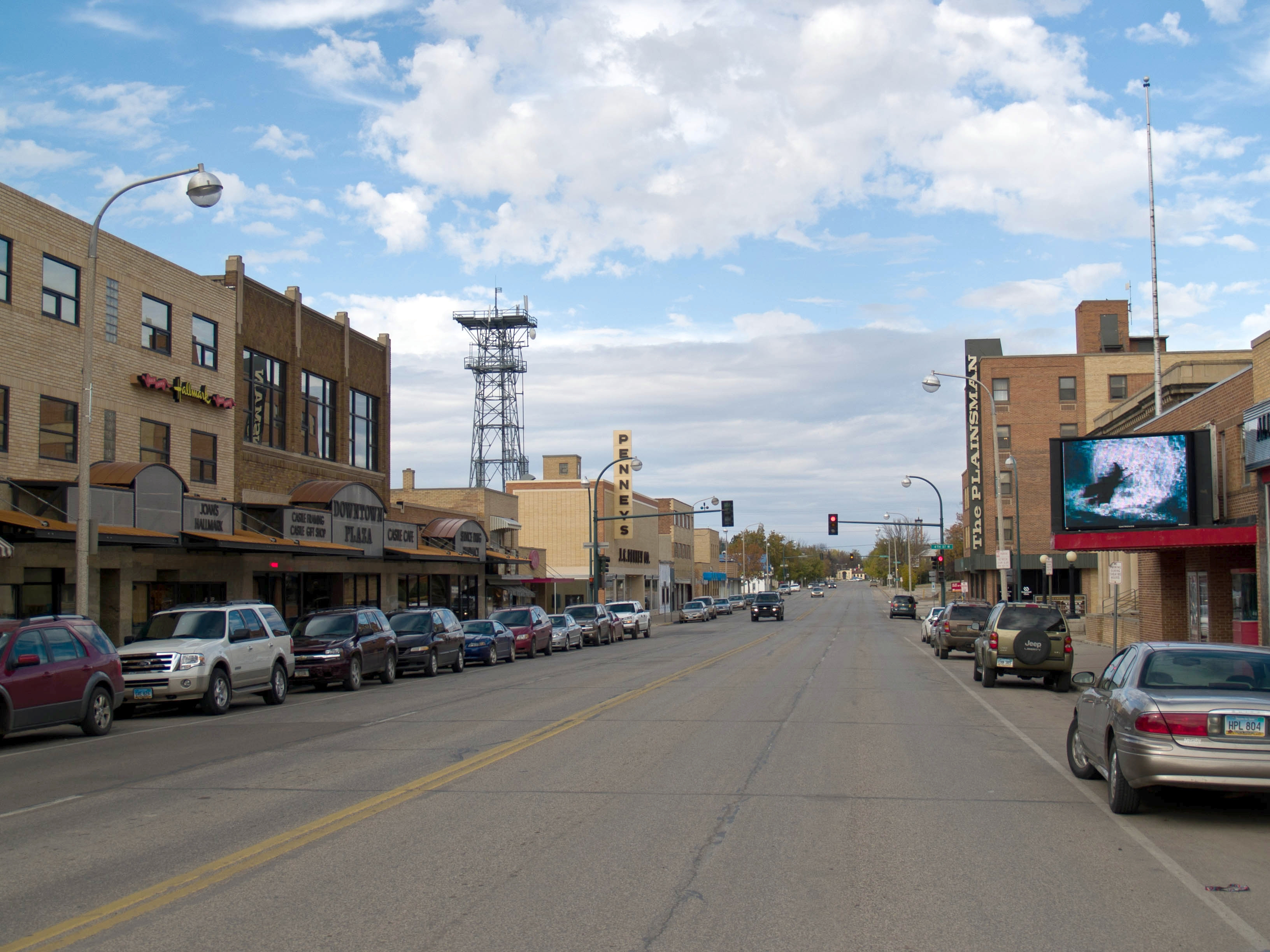
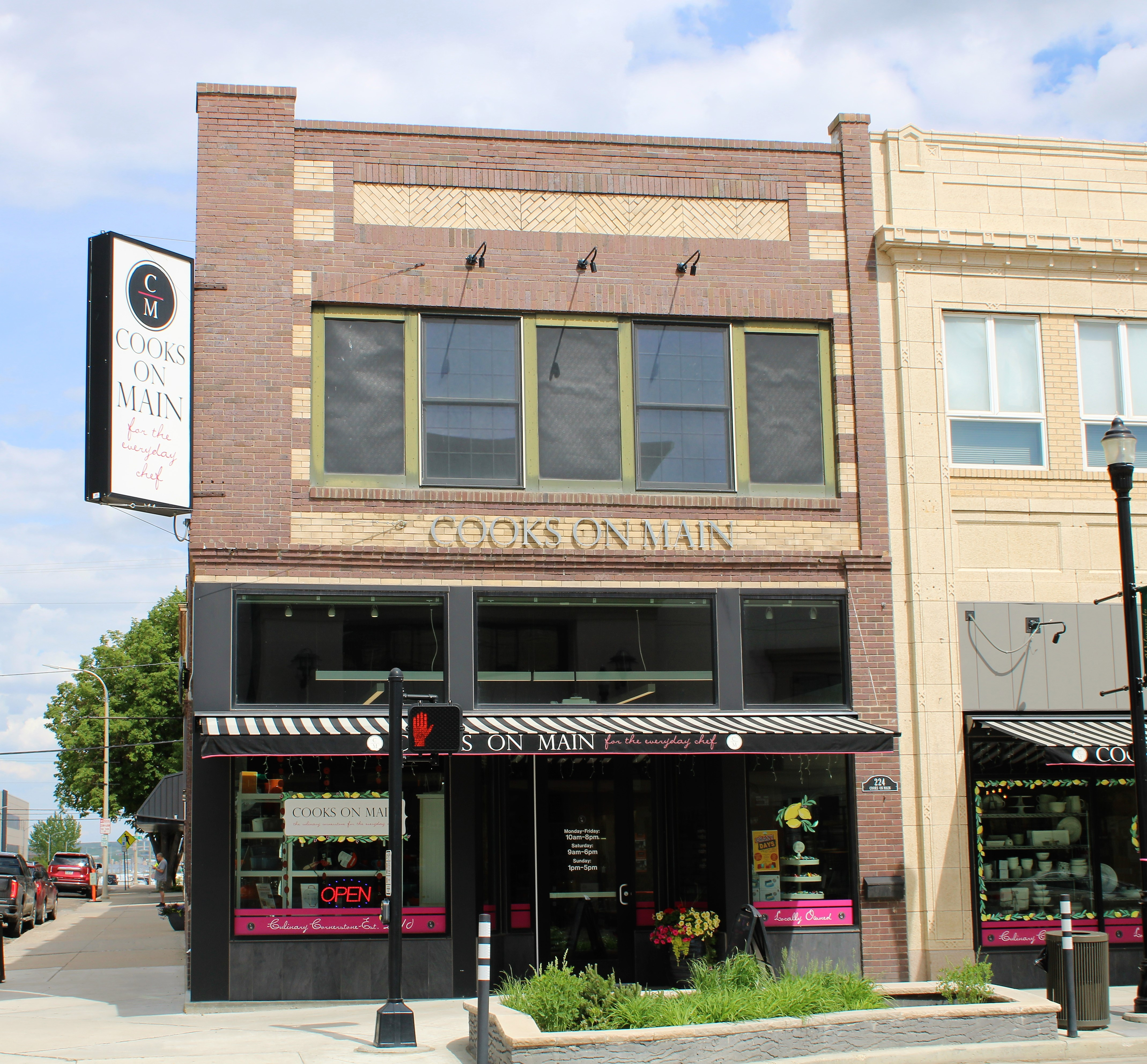
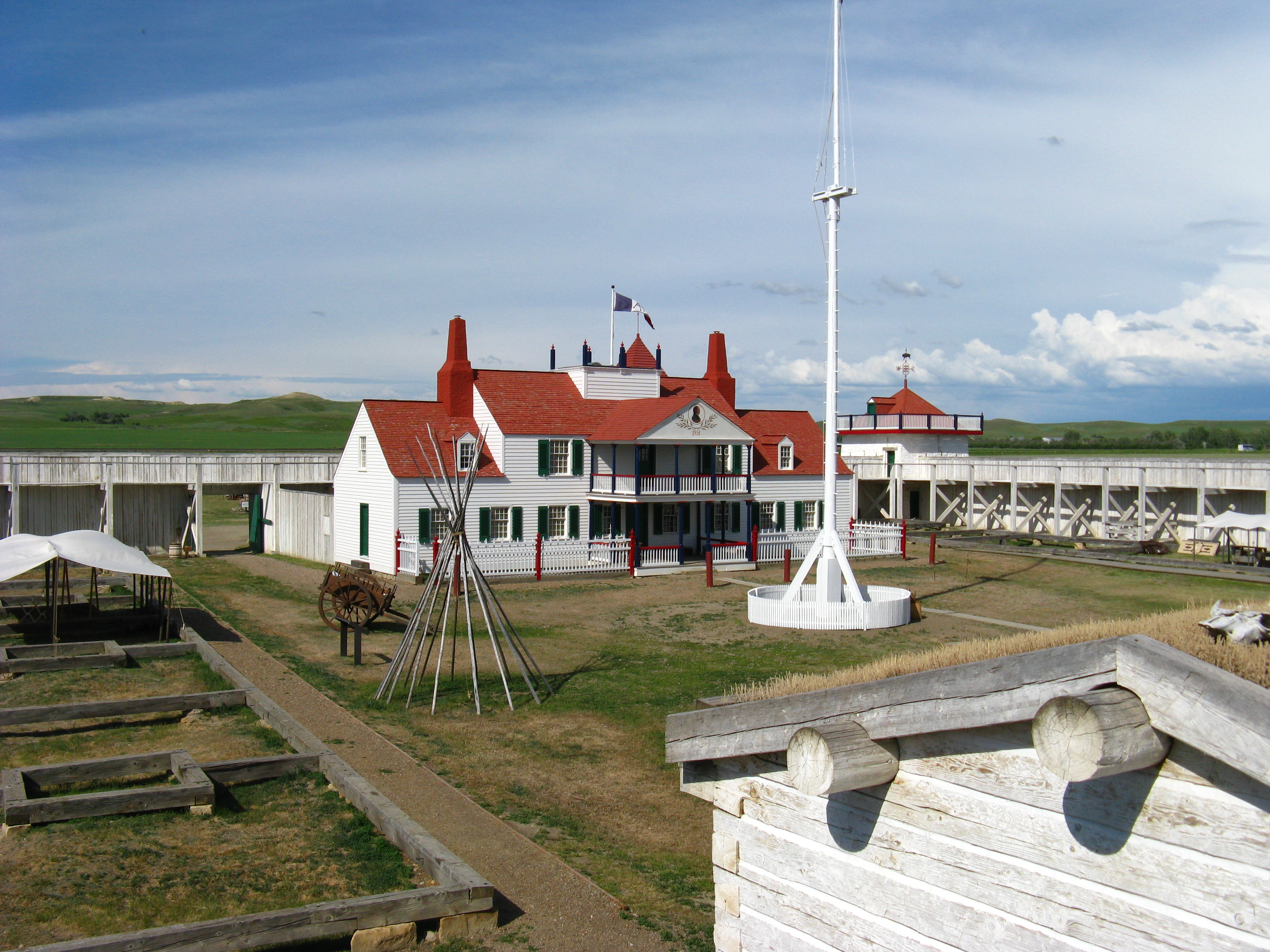
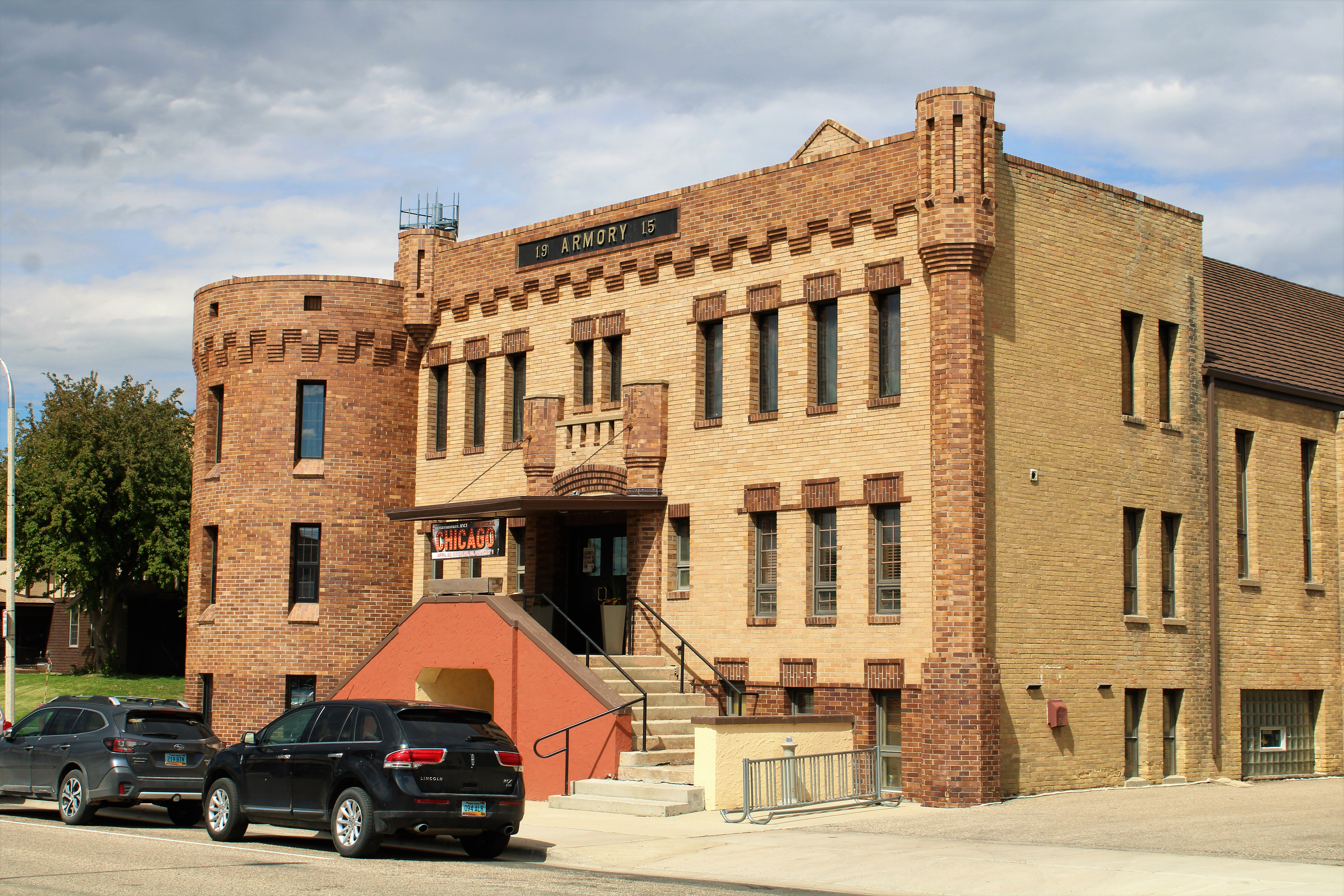
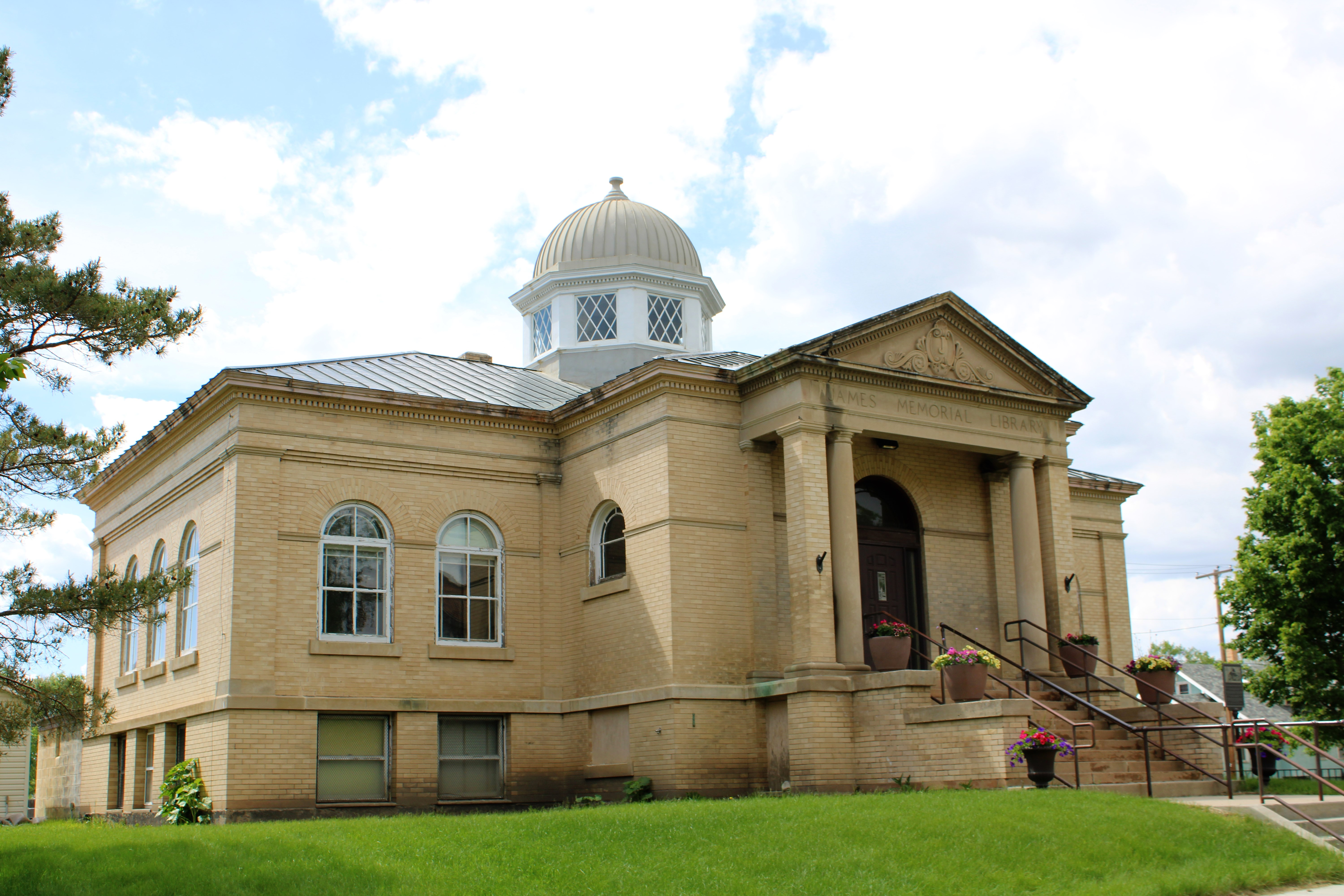
- Business district of Williston, 2008 Creaser Building Fort Union Trading Post Old Armory James Memorial Library

- Flag Logo

- Location of Williston, North Dakota

- Location within the United States
- Coordinates: 48°10′53″N 103°37′41″W
- Country: United States
- State: North Dakota
- County: Williams
- Founded: 1887
- Incorporated (village): 1894
- Incorporated (city): 1904

Government
  - Mayor: Cory Swint

Area
  - City: 25.875 sq mi (67.016 km^{2})
  - Land: 25.734 sq mi (66.652 km^{2})
  - Water: 0.141 sq mi (0.365 km^{2})
- Elevation: 1,916 ft (584 m)

Population (2020)
  - City: 29,160
  - Estimate (2025): 29,522
  - Density: 1,076.6/sq mi (415.69/km^{2})
  - Urban: 29,510
  - Metro: 39,113 (US: 324th)
- Time zone: UTC–6 (Central (CST))
  - Summer (DST): UTC–5 (CDT)
- ZIP Codes: 58801, 58802
- Area code: 701
- FIPS code: 38-86220
- GNIS feature ID: 1036335
- Highways: US 85, US 85 Bus., US 2, US 2 Bus., ND 1804
- Sales tax: 8.0%
- Website: cityofwilliston.com

Williston is a city in and the county seat of Williams County, North Dakota, United States. The 2020 census gave its population as 29,160, making Williston the sixth-most populous city in North Dakota.

It is near the southeast edge of the Williston Basin, named after the city. This huge subterranean geologic feature is known for its rich deposits of petroleum, coal, and potash, which contributed to the city's population nearly doubling between 2010 and 2020, due largely to the North Dakota oil boom.

Williston's newspaper is the weekly Williston Herald. Williston is the home of Williston State College and the Miss North Dakota Scholarship Pageant.

== History ==
Founded in 1887, Williston was named for Daniel Willis James, a merchant and capitalist, by his friend, railroad magnate James J. Hill.

In 1907 Williston was the site of a rolling cyclone that killed two people.

== Geography ==
Williston is located at the crossroads of U.S. Highways 2 and 85, near the confluence of the Yellowstone and Missouri rivers, at the upper end of the Lake Sakakawea.

According to the United States Census Bureau, the city has an area of 25.875 square miles (67.02 km^{2}), of which 25.734 square miles (66.65 km^{2}) is land and 0.141 square miles (0.37 km^{2}) is water.

The municipality is 18 miles (29 km) from the Montana-North Dakota border and 60 miles (97 km) from the Canadian border.

=== Climate ===
Williston has a cold semi-arid climate; closely bordering upon a warm-summer humid continental climate. It is part of USDA Hardiness zone 4a. The normal monthly mean temperature ranges from 11.5 °F (−11.4 °C) in January to 70.4 °F (21.3 °C) in July. On average, there are 2 days that reach 100 °F (38 °C) or higher, 22 days of 90 °F (32 °C)+ highs, 39 days with a low of 0 °F (−18 °C) or below, 7 days with lows plummeting to at least −20 °F (−29 °C), and 6 days that do not rise above 0 °F annually. The average window for freezing temperatures is September 20 through May 21, allowing a growing season of 121 days; . Extreme temperatures officially range from −50 °F (−46 °C) on December 23, 1983 and February 16, 1936 up to 110 °F (43 °C) on July 5, 1936; the record cold daily maximum is −29 °F (−34 °C) on January 16, 1930, while, conversely, the record warm daily minimum is 78 °F (26 °C) last set July 19, 1974.

Precipitation is greatest in June and July and averages 14.88 in (378 mm) annually, but has ranged from 6.13 in (156 mm) in 1934 to 22.04 in (560 mm) in 1896. Snowfall averages 48.2 in (122 cm) per season, and has historically ranged from 8.0 in (20 cm) in 1908–1909 to 107.2 in (272 cm) in 2010–2011; the average window for measurable (≥0.1 in or 0.25 cm) snowfall is October 21 through April 26, although snow in May occurs at most several times per decade and September snow is a much rarer event. Due to the relative aridity, there are only 3.9 days per season where 24-hour snowfall exceeds 3 in (7.6 cm).

Climate data for Williston, North Dakota (1991–2020 normals, (Note: Mean monthly maxima and minima (i.e. the expected highest and lowest temperature readings at any point during the year or given month) calculated based on data at said location from 1991 to 2020.) extremes 1894–present (Note: Official records for Williston kept at the Weather Bureau Office from January 1894 to June 1948, Sloulin Field International Airport from July 1948 until October 22, 2019, and the new Williston Basin Int'l since October 23, 2019.)
Month	Jan	Feb	Mar	Apr	May	Jun	Jul	Aug	Sep	Oct	Nov	Dec	Year
Record high °F (°C)	58 (14)	66 (19)	84 (29)	92 (33)	106 (41)	108 (42)	110 (43)	108 (42)	104 (40)	93 (34)	76 (24)	63 (17)	110 (43)
Mean maximum °F (°C)	44.0 (6.7)	46.7 (8.2)	65.1 (18.4)	79.0 (26.1)	86.6 (30.3)	93.5 (34.2)	98.0 (36.7)	98.9 (37.2)	93.3 (34.1)	80.3 (26.8)	60.4 (15.8)	46.1 (7.8)	100.6 (38.1)
Mean daily maximum °F (°C)	22.1 (−5.5)	26.7 (−2.9)	40.1 (4.5)	55.6 (13.1)	67.4 (19.7)	76.7 (24.8)	84.5 (29.2)	83.9 (28.8)	72.6 (22.6)	55.9 (13.3)	38.4 (3.6)	26.1 (−3.3)	54.2 (12.3)
Daily mean °F (°C)	11.6 (−11.3)	16.1 (−8.8)	28.8 (−1.8)	42.4 (5.8)	53.8 (12.1)	63.5 (17.5)	70.4 (21.3)	69.0 (20.6)	58.0 (14.4)	43.2 (6.2)	27.8 (−2.3)	16.1 (−8.8)	41.7 (5.4)
Mean daily minimum °F (°C)	1.0 (−17.2)	5.5 (−14.7)	17.5 (−8.1)	29.2 (−1.6)	40.2 (4.6)	50.2 (10.1)	56.3 (13.5)	54.0 (12.2)	43.5 (6.4)	30.4 (−0.9)	17.1 (−8.3)	6.1 (−14.4)	29.3 (−1.5)
Mean minimum °F (°C)	−25.8 (−32.1)	−19.5 (−28.6)	−7.6 (−22.0)	12.6 (−10.8)	24.4 (−4.2)	37.5 (3.1)	45.1 (7.3)	40.9 (4.9)	27.2 (−2.7)	12.0 (−11.1)	−4.6 (−20.3)	−19.8 (−28.8)	−29.2 (−34.0)
Record low °F (°C)	−42 (−41)	−50 (−46)	−35 (−37)	−15 (−26)	10 (−12)	26 (−3)	34 (1)	32 (0)	13 (−11)	−9 (−23)	−27 (−33)	−50 (−46)	−50 (−46)
Average precipitation inches (mm)	0.56 (14)	0.48 (12)	0.63 (16)	1.05 (27)	2.10 (53)	2.64 (67)	2.48 (63)	1.57 (40)	1.36 (35)	0.94 (24)	0.67 (17)	0.63 (16)	15.11 (384)
Average snowfall inches (cm)	11.2 (28)	6.7 (17)	6.4 (16)	3.7 (9.4)	0.9 (2.3)	0.0 (0.0)	0.0 (0.0)	0.0 (0.0)	0.0 (0.0)	2.6 (6.6)	6.3 (16)	10.4 (26)	48.2 (122)
Average precipitation days (≥ 0.01 in)	7.6	7.1	7.4	8.3	9.9	12.3	9.2	8.7	7.5	6.9	6.8	8.5	100.2
Average snowy days (≥ 0.1 in)	9.8	6.9	6.0	2.7	0.9	0.0	0.0	0.0	0.0	1.9	5.8	8.8	42.8
Average relative humidity (%)	71.3	75.6	72.5	61.4	58.5	59.6	56.1	54.9	61.1	65.2	74.9	77.1	66.1
Average dew point °F (°C)	3.4 (−15.9)	10.0 (−12.2)	19.9 (−6.7)	28.6 (−1.9)	38.8 (3.8)	48.6 (9.2)	52.2 (11.2)	49.5 (9.7)	41.2 (5.1)	31.1 (−0.5)	19.6 (−6.9)	7.5 (−13.6)	29.2 (−1.6)
Mean monthly sunshine hours	144.5	169.7	227.3	250.3	297.9	326.0	366.3	331.5	249.5	197.1	122.2	125.5	2,807.8
Percentage possible sunshine	53	59	62	61	63	68	76	75	66	59	44	48	63
Source: NOAA (relative humidity and dew point 1962–1990, sun 1961–1990) (Note: Only 22 to 24 years out of the 29 in the normals period were used to calculate the humidity normals.)

== Demographics ==
Historical population
Census	Pop.	Note	%±
1890	295		—
1900	763		158.6%
1910	3,124		309.4%
1920	4,178		33.7%
1930	5,106		22.2%
1940	5,790		13.4%
1950	7,398		27.8%
1960	11,866		60.4%
1970	11,230		−5.4%
1980	13,336		18.8%
1990	13,136		−1.5%
2000	12,512		−4.8%
2010	14,716		17.6%
2020	29,160		98.2%
2025 (est.)	29,522		1.2%
U.S. Decennial Census; 2020 Census

Williston is in northwestern North Dakota's booming oil patch, where adequate, affordable housing has become a concern since the 2010s. According to a February 2014 article in Business Insider, Williston had the highest apartment rents in the United States.

=== Racial and ethnic composition ===
Williston, North Dakota – racial and ethnic composition Note: the US Census treats Hispanic/Latino as an ethnic category. This table excludes Latinos from the racial categories and assigns them to a separate category. Hispanics/Latinos may be of any race.
Race / ethnicity (NH = non-Hispanic)	Pop. 2000	Pop. 2010	Pop. 2020	% 2000	% 2010	% 2020
White alone (NH)	11,622	13,428	21,049	92.89%	91.25%	72.18%
Black or African American alone (NH)	15	47	1,912	0.12%	0.32%	6.56%
Native American or Alaska Native alone (NH)	453	471	691	3.62%	3.20%	2.37%
Asian alone (NH)	30	47	545	0.24%	0.32%	1.87%
Pacific Islander alone (NH)	2	4	96	0.02%	0.03%	0.33%
Other race alone (NH)	0	2	104	0.00%	0.01%	0.36%
Mixed race or multiracial (NH)	236	389	1,600	1.89%	2.64%	5.49%
Hispanic or Latino (any race)	154	328	3,163	1.23%	2.23%	10.85%
Total	12,512	14,716	29,160	100.00%	100.00%	100.00%

=== 2020 census ===
As of the 2020 census, Williston had a population of 29,160 and a population density of 1,258.7 inhabitants per square mile (486.0/km^{2}). There were 14,417 housing units at an average density of 622.3 per square mile (240.3/km^{2}).

The median age was 30.8 years. 26.4% of residents were under the age of 18, 8.9% were under 5, and 8.1% were 65 or older. For every 100 females there were 118.1 males, and for every 100 females age 18 and over there were 123.8 males.

98.4% of residents lived in urban areas, while 1.6% lived in rural areas.

There were 11,706 households and 6,570 families. 32.7% of households had children under the age of 18 living in them; 39.3% were married-couple households, 31.1% were households with a male householder and no spouse or partner present, and 19.4% were households with a female householder and no spouse or partner present. About 32.6% of all households were made up of individuals, and 6.4% had someone living alone who was 65 years of age or older.

The housing unit vacancy rate was 18.8%; the homeowner vacancy rate was 2.5% and the rental vacancy rate was 22.2%.

Racial composition as of the 2020 census
Race	Number	Percent
White	21,899	75.1%
Black or African American	1,960	6.7%
American Indian and Alaska Native	764	2.6%
Asian	564	1.9%
Native Hawaiian and Other Pacific Islander	97	0.3%
Some other race	1,264	4.3%
Two or more races	2,612	9.0%
Hispanic or Latino (of any race)	3,163	10.8%

=== American Community Survey ===
As of the 2022 American Community Survey, there are 11,410 estimated households in Williston with an average of 2.39 persons per household. The city has a median household income of $80,352. Approximately 7.4% of the city's population lives at or below the poverty line. Williston has an estimated 76.8% employment rate, with 25.8% of the population holding a bachelor's degree or higher and 89.8% holding a high school diploma.

The top nine reported ancestries (people were allowed to report up to two ancestries, thus the figures will generally add to more than 100%) were German (18.0%), Norwegian (15.5%), English (4.5%), Irish (4.5%), Subsaharan African (2.9%), Polish (2.4%), French (except Basque) (2.1%), Scottish (1.3%), and Italian (0.8%).

=== 2010 census ===
As of the 2010 census, there were 14,716 people, 6,180 households, and 3,589 families residing in the city. The population density was 1,962.1 inhabitants per square mile (757.6/km^{2}). There were 6,542 housing units at an average density of 872.3 per square mile (336.8/km^{2}). The racial makeup of the city was 92.65% White, 0.35% African American, 3.32% Native American, 0.33% Asian, 0.03% Pacific Islander, 0.35% from some other races and 2.98% from two or more races. Hispanic or Latino people of any race were 2.23% of the population.

There were 6,180 households, of which 29.0% had children under the age of 18 living with them, 44.6% were married couples living together, 9.0% had a female householder with no husband present, 4.5% had a male householder with no wife present, and 41.9% were non-families. 34.6% of all households were made up of individuals, and 12.3% had someone living alone who was 65 years of age or older. The average household size was 2.31 and the average family size was 2.99.

The median age in the city was 35.5 years. 23.6% of residents were under the age of 18; 10% were between the ages of 18 and 24; 26.7% were from 25 to 44; 25.4% were from 45 to 64; and 14.4% were 65 years of age or older. The gender makeup of the city was 51.0% male and 49.0% female.

=== 2000 census ===
As of the 2000 census, there were 12,512 people, 5,255 households, and 3,205 families residing in the city. The population density was 1,794.1 inhabitants per square mile (692.7/km^{2}). There were 5,912 housing units at an average density of 847.7 inhabitants per square mile (327.3/km^{2}). The racial makeup of the city was 93.69% White, 0.17% African American, 3.65% Native American, 0.24% Asian, 0.02% Pacific Islander, 0.17% from some other races and 2.06% from two or more races. Hispanic or Latino people of any race were 1.23% of the population.

The six leading ancestry groups in the city are Norwegian (47.8%), German (31.6%), Irish (9.6%), English (5.8%), Swedish (4.5%), Dutch (4.3%) and French (4.0%).

There were 5,255 households, of which 30.7% had children under the age of 18 living with them, 47.4% were married couples living together, 10.5% had a female householder with no husband present, and 39.0% were non-families. 34.1% of all households were made up of individuals, and 13.7% had someone living alone who was 65 years of age or older. The average household size was 2.30 and the average family size was 2.96.

The age distribution was 25.6% under the age of 18, 9.3% from 18 to 24, 25.8% from 25 to 44, 22.5% from 45 to 64, and 16.8% who were 65 years of age or older. The median age was 38 years. For every 100 females, there were 91.9 males. For every 100 females age 18 and over, there were 88.3 males.

The median income for a household in the city was $29,962, and the median income for a family was $38,713. Males had a median income of $29,578 versus $18,879 for females. The per capita income for the city was $16,656. About 11.3% of families and 13.4% of the population were below the poverty line, including 19.1% of those under age 18 and 7.8% of those age 65 or over.

== Economy ==
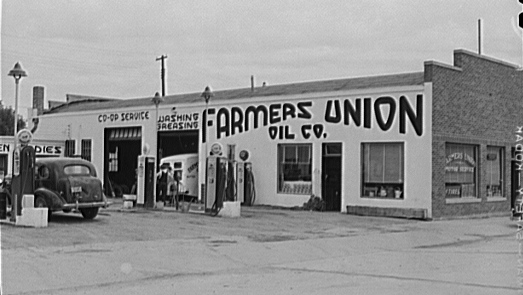
Gas station at Farmers' Cooperative in Williston, 1941. Photo by Marion Post Wolcott.

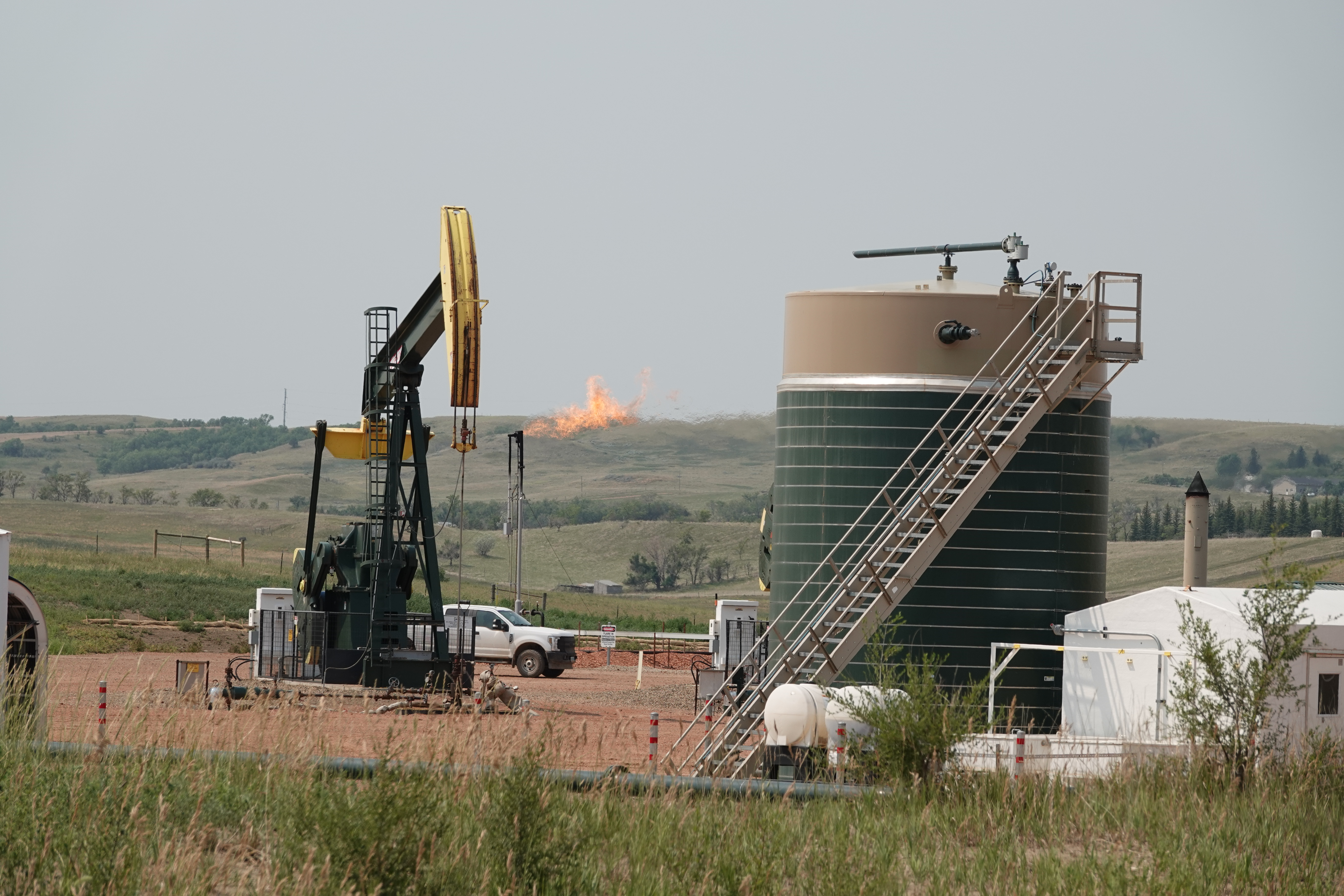
Pumping oil and flaring gas near Williston, July 2021

Williston's economy, while historically based in agriculture and especially ranching, is increasingly being driven by the oil industry. The Williston Basin, named after the town, is a huge subterranean geologic feature known for its rich deposits of petroleum, coal, and potash.

Williston developed over the Bakken formation, which by the end of 2012 was predicted to be producing more oil than any other site in the United States, surpassing even Alaska's Prudhoe Bay, the longtime leader in domestic output in the nation. The oil boom has been spurred here by the development of new technologies—such as fracking—which enabled extraction from areas previously inaccessible.

In 1995, the U.S. Geological Survey estimated that there were 150 million barrels of oil "technically recoverable" from the Bakken shale. In April 2008, the number was said to be about four billion barrels; in 2010 geologists at Continental Resources, the major drilling operation in North Dakota, estimated the reserve at eight billion. In March 2012, after the discovery of a lower shelf of oil, it announced a possible 24 billion barrels. Although current technology allows for extraction of only about 6% of the oil trapped 0.99–1.99 mi (1.6–3.2 km) beneath the earth's surface, recoverable oil might eventually exceed 500 billion barrels.

Williston has seen a huge increase in population and infrastructure investments during the last several years with expanded drilling using the fracking petroleum extraction technique in the Bakken Formation and Three Forks Groups. Examples of oil industry-related infrastructure investments are the multi-acre branch campus of Baker Hughes and the Sand Creek Retail Center.

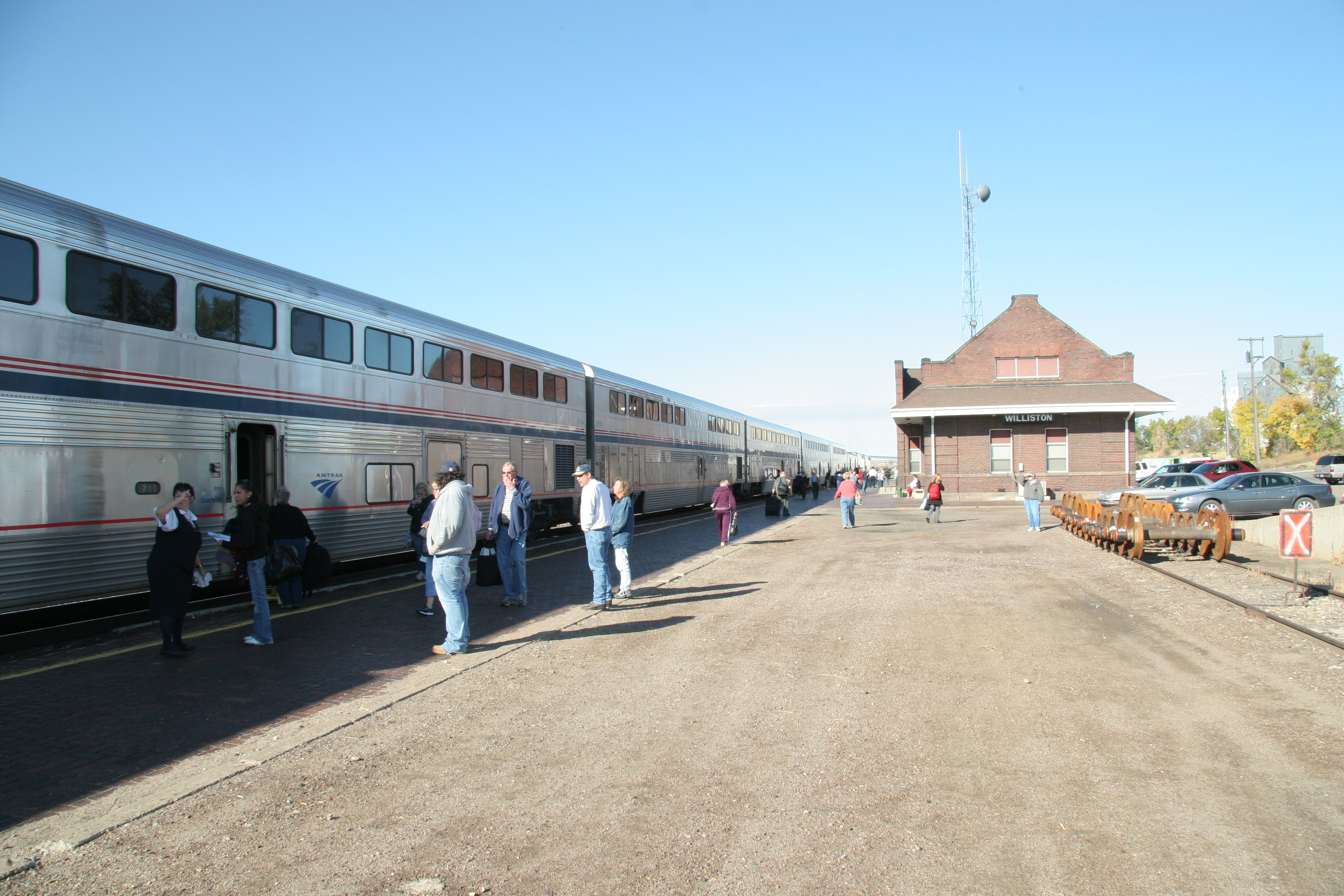
Williston Amtrak Station

A major regional grain elevator is served by the BNSF Railway. Williston's livestock arena has weekly auctions.

Forts Union and Buford, as well as the nearby confluence of the Yellowstone and Missouri Rivers west of the city, associated with the history of the Lewis and Clark Expedition and development of the fur trade and frontier—are destinations for area tourism. Williston is also comparatively close to the North Unit of Theodore Roosevelt National Park.

== Arts and culture ==
Sites listed on the National Register of Historic Places include:

- James Memorial Library, established in 1911, now James Memorial Art Center.
- The Old Armory, built in 1915, now used by the community theater non-profit Entertainment, Inc!, founded in 1981.

=== Library ===
The first Williston Public Library was completed in town in 1911, opening February 27, 1911, and it operated as the only facility until 1983. In the early 1990s the city began to address the issue of probable demolition of this aged building to replace it with one meeting modern needs. Williston Public Library serves as the public library for all of Williams County. The library also has a bookmobile that serves rural schools and retirement home communities.

== Sports ==
- Williston Keybirds of North Dakota American League Baseball.
- The Williston Oilers played as members of the Mandak League from 1954 to 1957, winning the 1956 league championship. The Oilers played minor league home games at Ardean Aafedt Stadium.
- Coyote Clay Target League.

== Parks and recreation ==
- Eagle Ridge Golf Club – an 18-hole golf course.
- Williston Municipal Golf Course – a nine-hole golf course.
- Williston Area Recreation Center – a 234,000 square feet (21,700 m^{2}) recreation center, built in 2014, that features indoor surfing, golf simulators, a water park, tennis and basketball courts, turf fields, and an indoor track.

== Education ==
The Williston Basin School District 7 serves the entire city, with Williston High School as its public high school.

Previously the majority of the city limits was in Williston Public School District 1 while some parts were in Williams County Public School District 8 (formerly New Public School District 8, elementary only). The two districts merged into Williston Basin on July 1, 2021.

Trinity Christian School is a private K–12 school, and St. Joseph Catholic School (of the Roman Catholic Diocese of Bismarck) a private K–6 school.

Williston State College was founded in 1961 as the University of North Dakota—Williston. It is a two-year public college in the North Dakota University System. Students can earn associate degrees, and transfer to the state universities offering four-year programs and degrees.

== Media ==
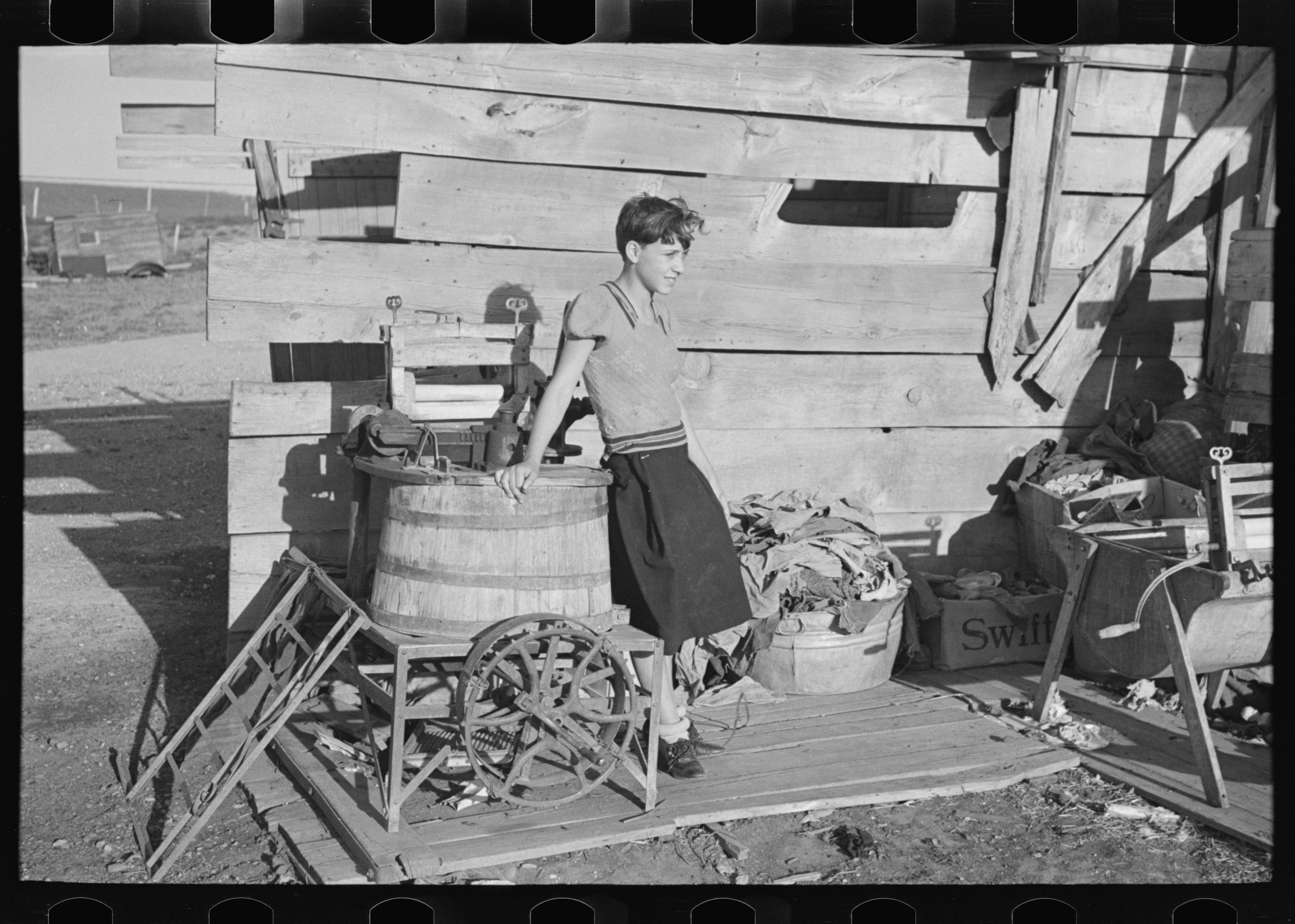
A woman photographed in Williston in 1937 by Russell Lee

=== Print ===
- Williston Herald
- Oil Patch Hotline

=== Television ===
- 4.1 KWSE (PBS via Prairie Public Television)
- 8.1 KUMV-TV (NBC, with Fox on 8.2)
- 11.1 KXMD-TV (The CW)

=== Radio ===
FM

- 88.1 K201FJ CSN network – Christian
- 89.5 KPPR North Dakota Public Radio/NPR affiliate
- 90.3 K212DW K-LOVE network – contemporary Christian music
- 90.7 KJND-FM Your Network of Praise – Christian
- 91.7 K219CB American Family Radio network – Christian
- 93.1 KGCX "Eagle 93" Classic rock – based in Sidney, Montana
- 95.1 KTHC "Power 95.1" Hot Adult Contemporary
- 96.1 KYYZ "Z96.1 Country Thunder" Country
- 101.1 KDSR "Hot 101" Jack FM
- 102.7 KHRT translator – contemporary christian music

AM

- 660 KEYZ "Keyz NewsRadio" News/Talk/Country
- 1070 KATQ Country – based in Plentywood, Montana
- 1090 KTGO Country – based in Tioga

== Infrastructure ==
=== Transportation ===
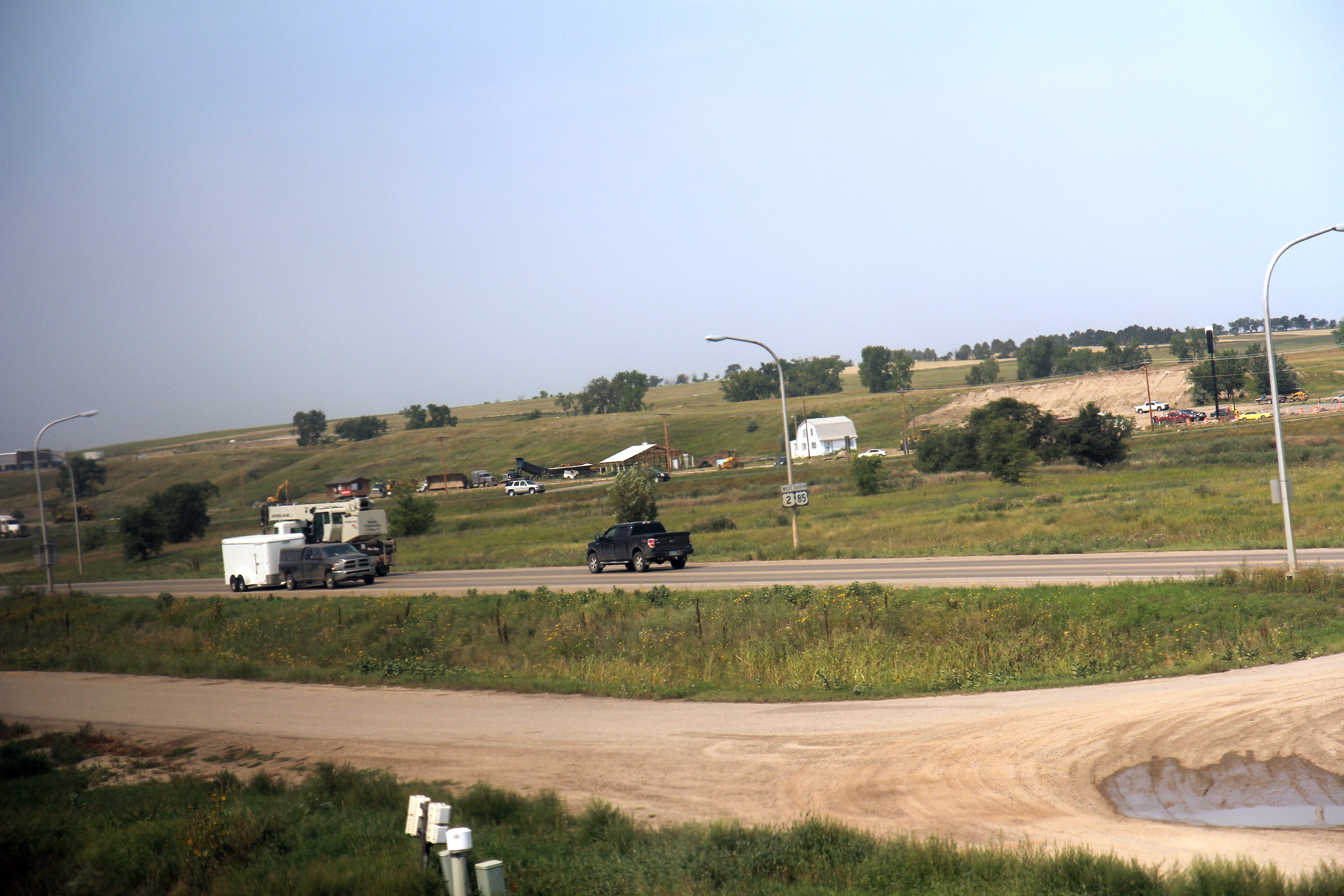
US 2 and US 85 at Williston

Williston Basin International Airport opened in 2019, replacing Sloulin Field International Airport.

Amtrak serves a station in Williston via its Empire Builder, a once-daily train in each direction between Portland, Oregon/Seattle, Washington, and Chicago.

US 2 runs through the city. US 85 bypasses the city to the northwest, and US 85B bypasses the city to the northeast. ND 1804 runs through the southern portion of the city.

Demand response service is provided by Northwest Dakota Public Transit. There is no fixed-route bus service in the city.

=== Health care ===
Williston clinics include Craven-Hagan Clinic, Fairlight Medical Center, and Trinity Community Clinic-Western Dakota.

Mercy Medical Center provides 24-hour emergency and trauma care, and features the Leonard P. Nelson Family Cancer Treatment Center.

== Notable people ==
- James A. Abrahamson, retired USAF officer and first head of the Strategic Defense Initiative a.k.a. "Star Wars"
- Larry Bergh, selected by the Chicago Bulls in the 1969 NBA draft, but never played
- James R. Carrigan, United States District Court judge and Colorado Supreme Court justice, practiced law in Williston
- Michael Dwyer, member of the North Dakota Senate
- Julie Fedorchak, U.S. representative for North Dakota
- Sally Fraser, actress, born in Williston
- Virgil Hill, silver medalist Olympic boxer (1984), four-time world champion boxer who lost his title to Xue Li
- Darlene Hooley, congresswoman from Oregon
- Phil Jackson, 11-time NBA championship head coach
- Mark Lee, pitcher with the Kansas City Royals, Milwaukee Brewers, and Baltimore Orioles
- Steve Lynch, guitarist for the band Autograph
- Brent Qvale, professional football player
- Brian Qvale, professional basketball player

== See also ==
- Williston (Amtrak station)
- Williston Herald
