= Long Creek =

Long Creek may refer to:

== United States ==
=== Waterways ===
- Long Creek (White River tributary), a stream in Boone and Carroll counties of Arkansas
- Long Creek (Iowa River tributary), a stream in Iowa
- Long Creek (Beaver Creek tributary), a stream in Taney County, Missouri
- Long Creek (New York), a salt-water channel on Long Island
- Long Creek (Fore River tributary), a stream in Maine

=== Communities ===
- Long Creek, Illinois
- Long Creek Township, Macon County, Illinois
- Long Creek Township, Decatur County, Iowa
- Long Creek, North Carolina
- Long Creek, North Dakota
- Long Creek, Oregon
  - Long Creek School (Oregon)
- Long Creek, South Carolina
  - Long Creek Academy
- Long Creek, Sunnyvale, Texas

== Canada ==
- Long Creek, Prince Edward Island, a community
- Long Creek (Saskatchewan), a river near Estevan
  - Long Creek Bridge
