= Fortuna–Oungre Border Crossing =

Border crossing between Canada and the United States

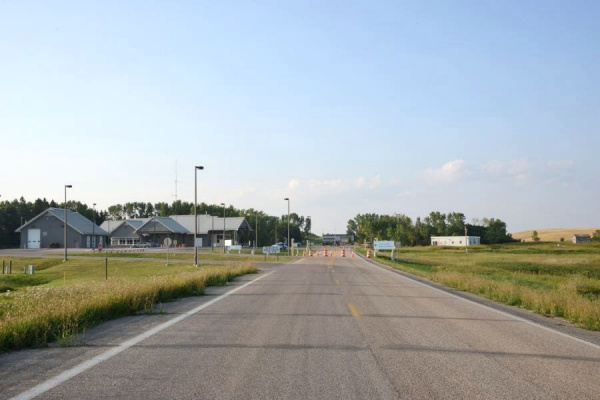
- US Border Inspection Station at Fortuna, North Dakota looking north

Locaiton
- Country: United States; Canada
- Location: US 85 / Highway 35; US Port: 10935 HWY 85 NW, Fortuna, North Dakota 58844-0037; Canadian Port: Saskatchewan Highway 35, Oungre, Saskatchewan S0C 1Z0
- Coordinates: 48.999544°N 103.809461°W

Website
- https://www.cbp.gov/contact/ports/fortuna-north-dakota-3417 https://www.cbsa-asfc.gc.ca/do-rb/offices-bureaux/624-eng.html

The Fortuna–Oungre Border Crossing connects the towns of Fortuna, North Dakota and Oungre, Saskatchewan on the Canada–US border. It is located along the CanAm Highway: U.S. Route 85 on the American side and Saskatchewan Highway 35 on the Canadian side. It is the westernmost border crossing in the state of North Dakota. It is a lightly-used crossing with the reduction in local population due to agricultural automation and the 1984 closure of the Fortuna Air Force Station.

The US replaced its 1950s-era yellow brick border station in 2004 with a sprawling grey inspection complex. The Canada border station was built in 1978. This crossing was established as a port of entry in 1930.

== See also ==
- List of Canada–United States border crossings
