= Long Creek Railroad =

Shortline railway in Saskatchewan, Canada

Overview
- Headquarters: Tribune
- Locale: Estevan to Tribune
- Dates of operation: 2012–
- Predecessor: Canadian Pacific Railway

Technical
- Track gauge: 4 ft 8 1/2 in (1,435 mm) standard gauge
- Length: 41 miles

Other
- Website: www.longcreekrailroad.ca

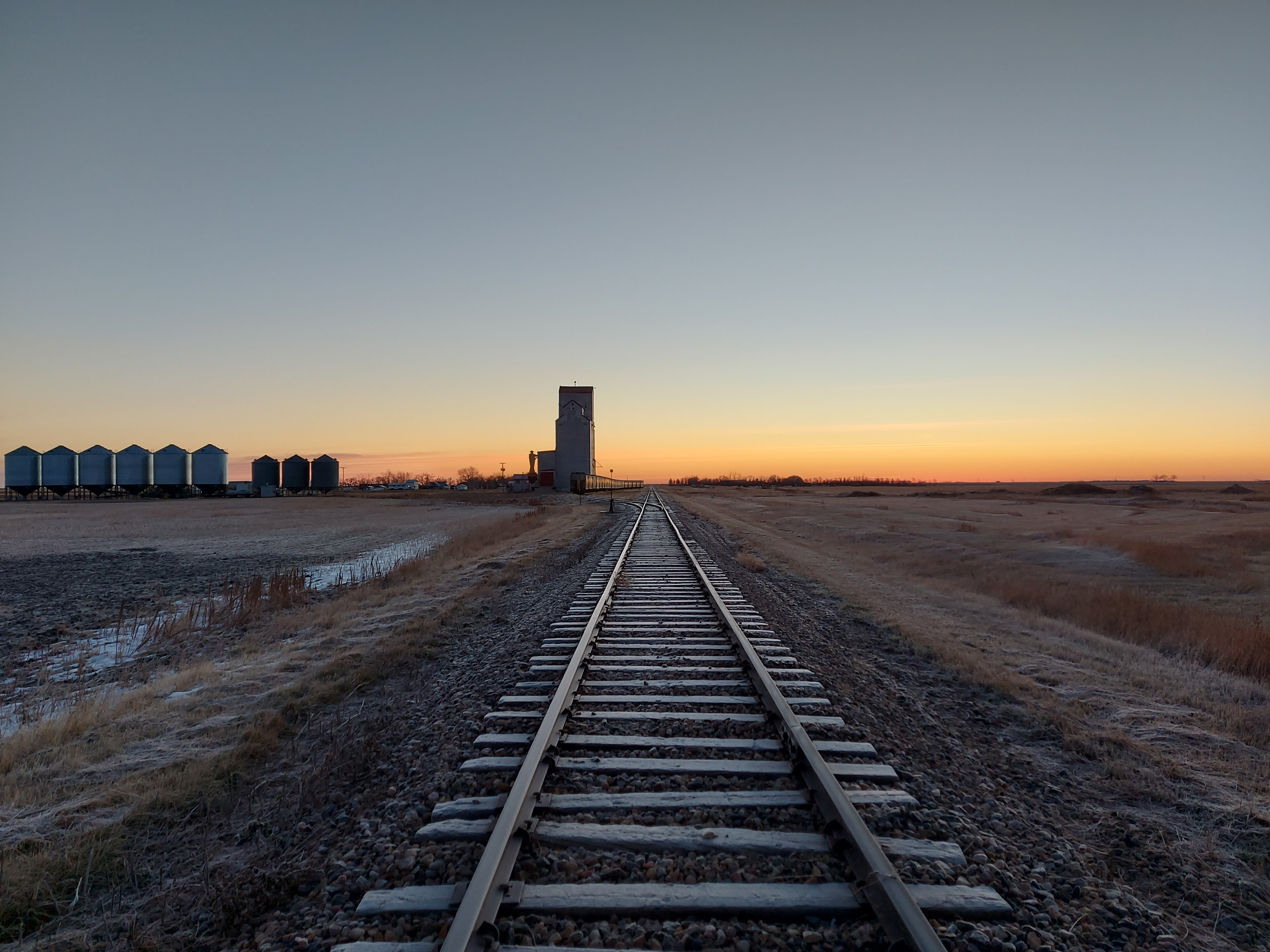
Long Creek Railroad

The Long Creek Railroad is a Canadian shortline railway operating in the Canadian province of Saskatchewan.

== History ==
The Long Creek Railroad officially opened on October 2, 2012. The railway was formed in 2012 when the Long Creek Railroad, previously a rail equipment operating company that had been managing the line since 2005, organized the purchase of 40 miles of former Canadian Pacific Railway trackage with the support of about 25 initial investors. The line, formerly owned by Canadian Pacific Railway and known as CP Bromhead, was slated for discontinuation in 2005. The CP Bromhead Sub was built in 1913 by Canadian Pacific, and was originally known as the Neptune Branch which ran between Estevan and Neptune, Saskatchewan. The current line begins in Tribune and runs to Estevan where it meets the Canadian Pacific at mile 137.5 of CP Weyburn Sub. The creation of the company was spurred by an $800,000 interest free loan, covering about 32% of the total purchase price, from the Saskatchewan government, which has a program to encourage the transfer of short lines to local ownership.

== Operations ==
Currently 90% of the freight is grain, although fracking sand is a growing segment of the railway's business. Other revenues derive from storing rail cars, mainly oil and asphalt tankers. There are plans, despite market conditions, to revive oil and gas shipments via the line. Torq Transloading built an oil transfer site at the former community of Southall to load local petroleum into tankers for delivery to refineries. Additionally, trans-loading agreements have been signed with the Rural Municipality of Souris Valley No. 7.

== Engines ==
Engines operated by the Long Creek Railroad include LCR 6347, an ex. Southern Pacific GP35, purchased from the Dakota Missouri Valley & Western Railway in 2013.

== Communities ==
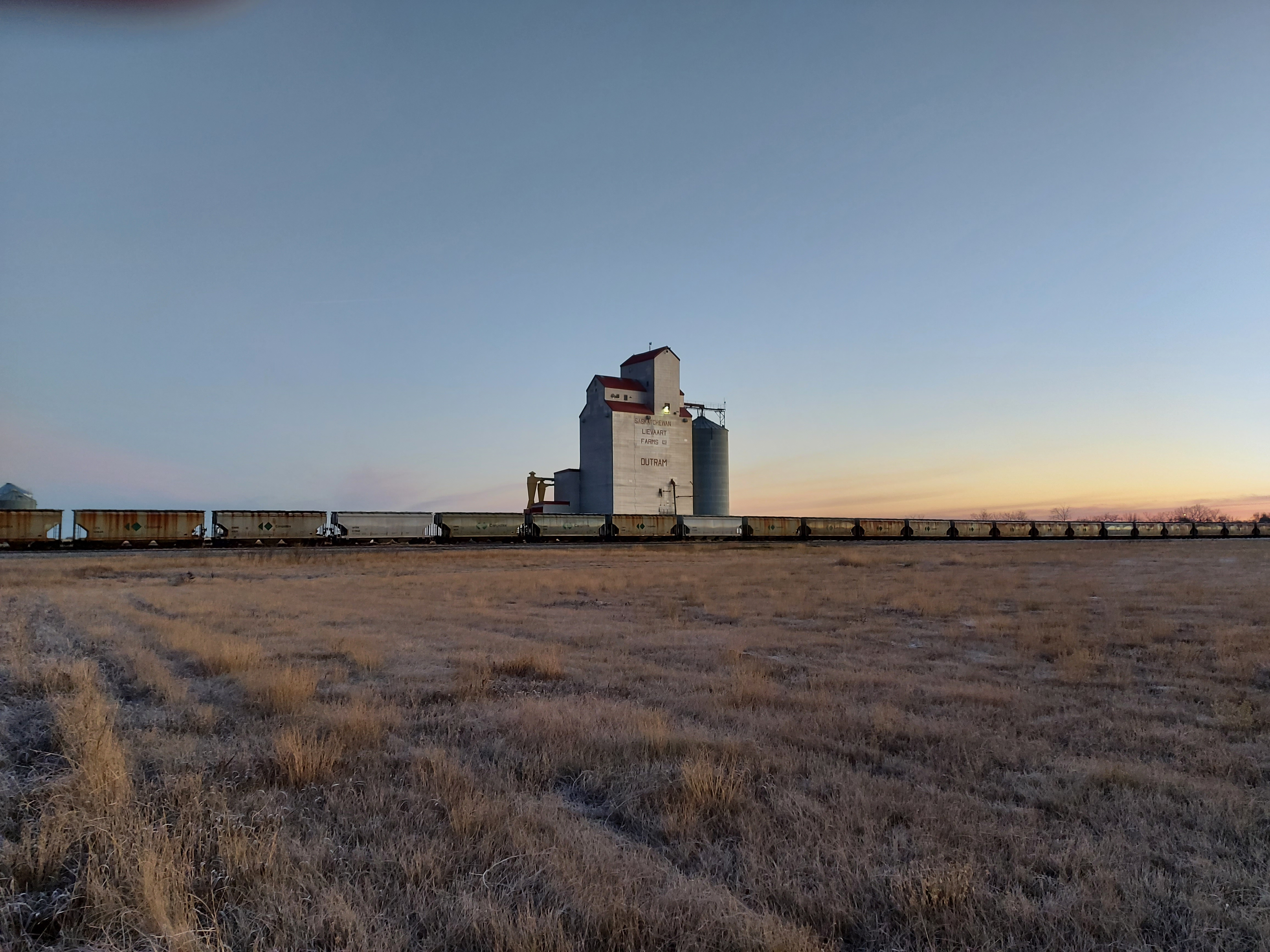
Long Creek Railroad at Outram grain elevator

The Long Creek Railroad runs 41 miles and serves the communities of Estevan, Outram, Torquay, Bromhead, and Tribune. It operates two loading facilities at Pederson Heritage farms in Torquay and Souris Valley Grain in Tribune.

== See also ==
- Long Creek (Saskatchewan)
