= Long Creek (Saskatchewan) =

River in central North America

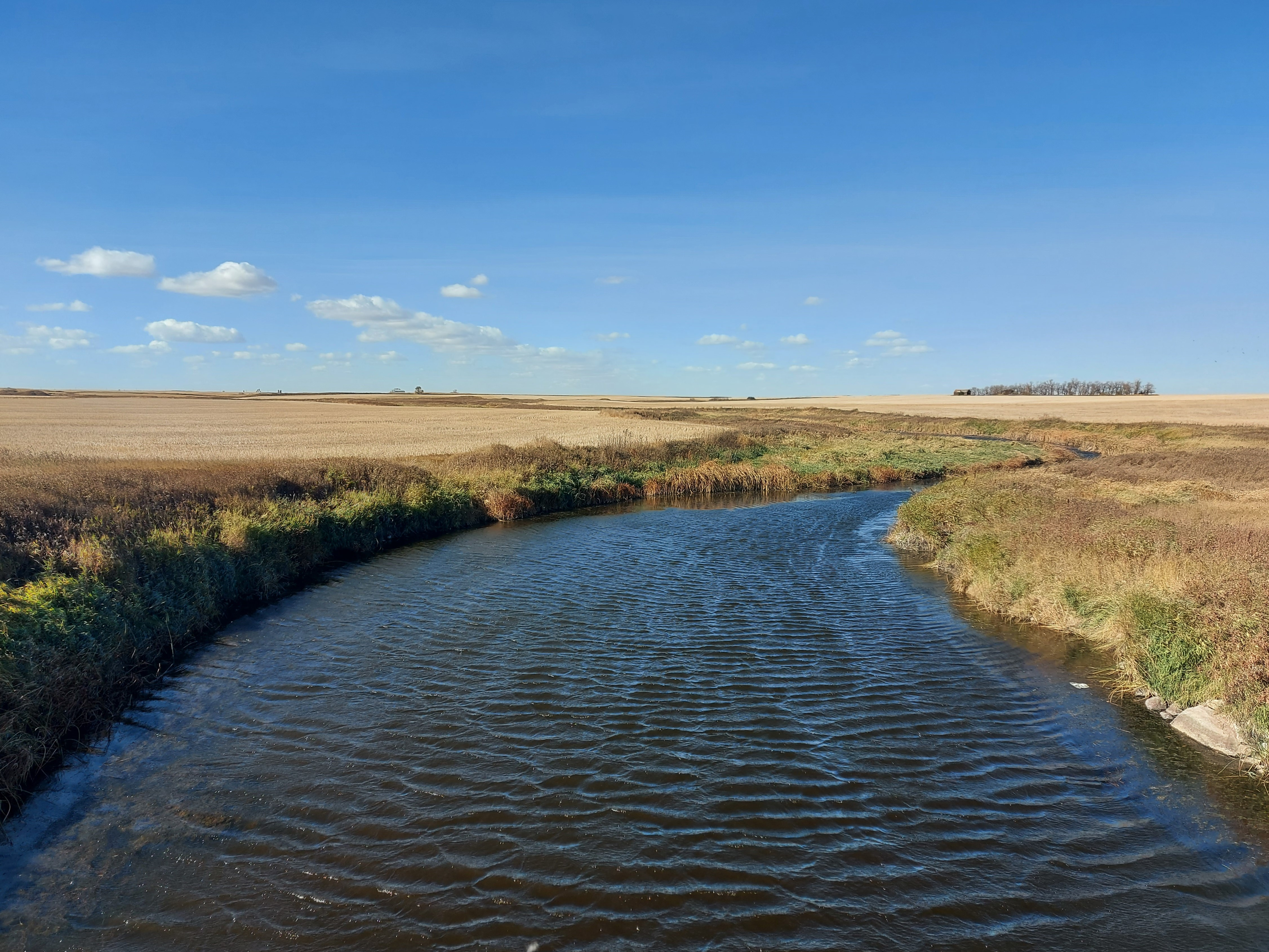
- Long Creek in Saskatchewan

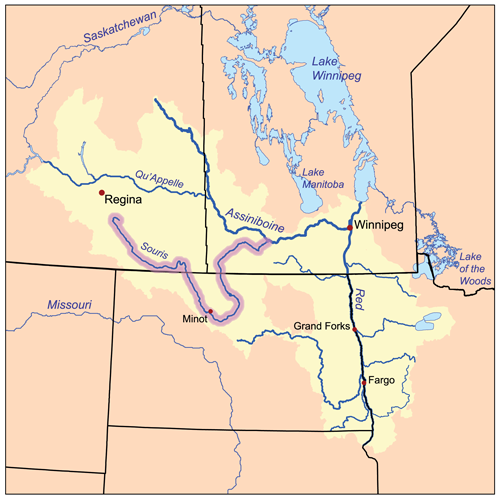
- The Red River drainage basin, with the Souris River highlighted

- Location in Saskatchewan Long Creek (Saskatchewan) (Saskatchewan)

Location
- Countries: Canada; United States
- Provinces: Saskatchewan
- State: North Dakota
- Towns: Radville, Sk

Physical characteristics
- Source: near Forward and Khedive
  - location: Saskatchewan
  - coordinates: 49.6178°N 104.4778°W
- Mouth: Souris River
  - location: Saskatchewan
  - coordinates: 49°07′00″N 102°59′24″W
- Discharge
  - location: Boundary Dam, south of Estevan

Basin features
- River system: Red River drainage basin
- Tributaries
  - left: Gibson Creek
  - right: Larson Reservoir

Long Creek is a river in central North America that begins in Saskatchewan, flows south-east into North Dakota, and then flows back north into Saskatchewan. It is a tributary of the Souris River. The Souris River drains into the Assiniboine River, which is part of the Red River drainage basin in a region called the Prairie Pothole Region of North America, which extends throughout three Canadian provinces and five U.S. states. It is also within Palliser's Triangle and the Great Plains ecoregion. In 1957, a dam was built on Long Creek near where it meets the Souris River to create Boundary Dam Reservoir.

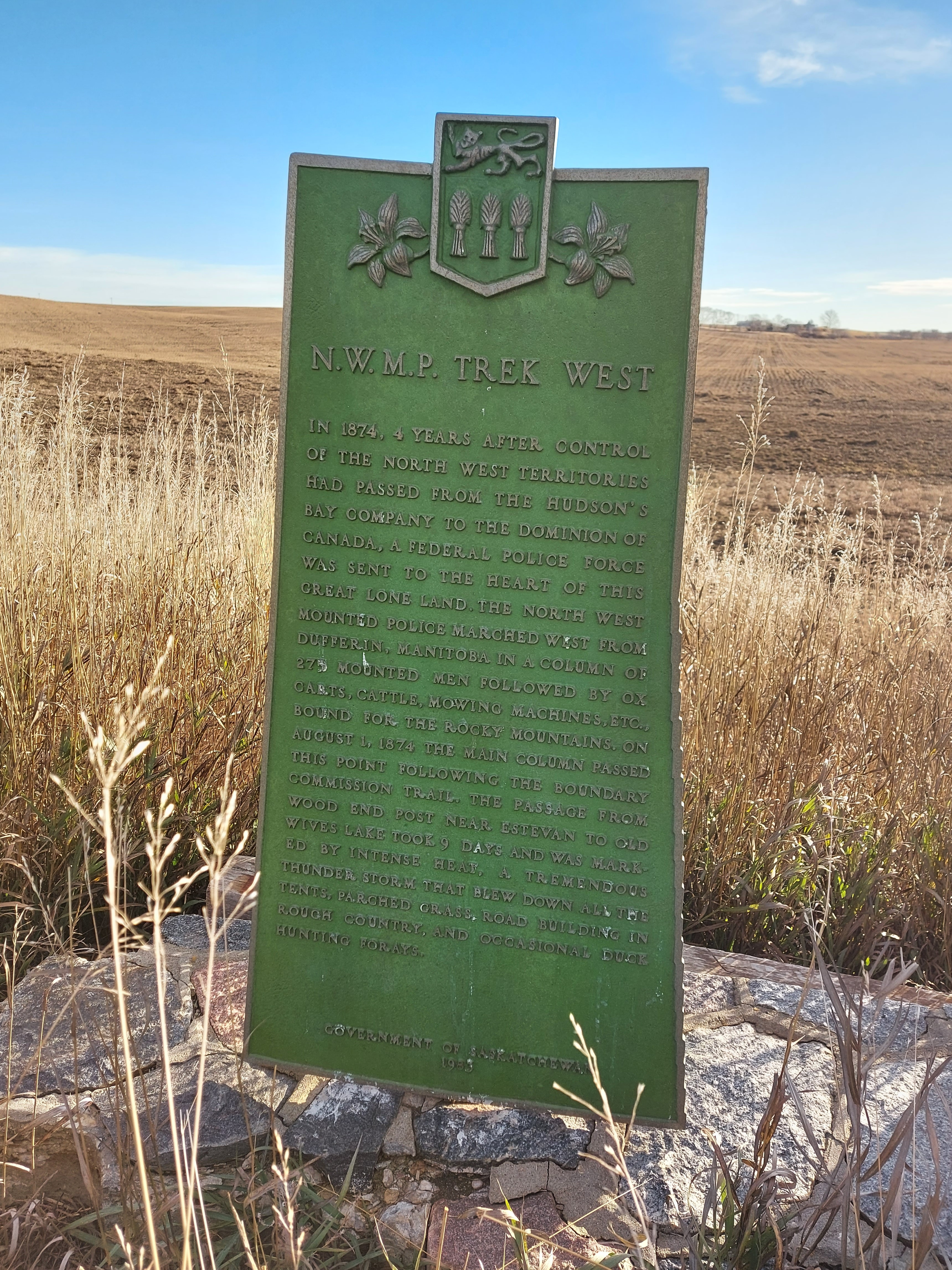
A plaque along Long Creek and Highway 35 commemorating the North-West Mounted Police and their March West in 1874

In 1873, the Boundary Commission set out from Pembina, Dakota Territory to survey the Canada–United States border. The route used by the commission followed several rivers near the border, including Long Creek. In 1874, the North-West Mounted Police followed the same route along Long Creek on their March West to deal with the Cypress Hills Massacre.

== Course ==
The source of Long Creek is in Saskatchewan, just south of Highway 13, near Forward and Khedive. From there it flows in a south-easterly direction towards Radville, the largest community on the river. Just north of Radville, Gibson Creek meets Long Creek. Near that point, a dam was built to create a small lake called Radville Reservoir. From Radville, it continues south-east towards Tribune where it crosses the first main highway, Highway 35. After Highway 35, it passes Oungre Memorial Regional Park and the community of Oungre en route to Highway 18. From Highway 18, it continues south-east towards the Canada–United States border, crossing Highway 350. It crosses the border about 11.2 kilometres (7.0 mi) north of Crosby, North Dakota. At this point, the river goes through Crosby Country Club golf course and continues eastward before eventually turning due north back into Canada about 4.8 kilometres (3.0 mi) west of the Noonan–Estevan Highway Border Crossing. Once back into Canada, the river empties into Boundary Dam Reservoir. Long Creek is the primary inflow and outflow for the reservoir, which supplies water to the Boundary Dam Power Station. Until 2020, the reservoir also supplied Estevan's water. After the dam, Long Creek flows into the Souris River Valley where it meets the Souris River.

== Tributaries ==
- Gibson Creek, a river that flows generally from west to east and meets up with Long Creek at Radville Reservoir, just north of the town of Radville. Gibson Creek's source is just south-west of Ceylon, Saskatchewan near the junction of Highway 6 and Highway 705.
- Larson Reservoir, a man-made lake on the east side of Radville that flows into Long Creek.

== See also ==
- SaskPower
- Long Creek Railroad
- Long Creek Bridge
- List of rivers of Saskatchewan
- List of rivers of North Dakota
- Hudson Bay drainage basin
