= Alexander, North Dakota =

- City
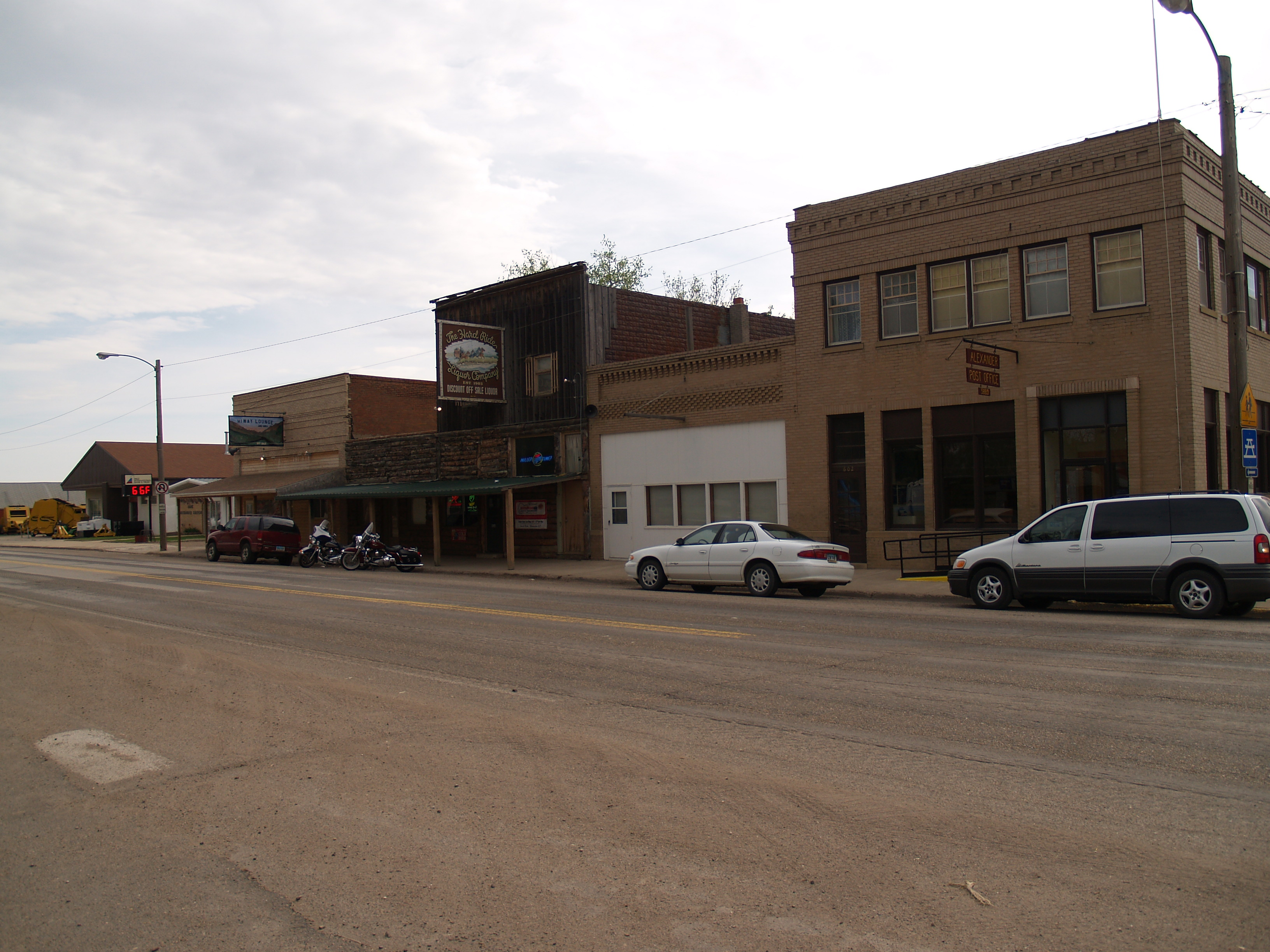
- Downtown Alexander

- Logo
- Interactive map of Alexander, North Dakota
- Location within North Dakota
- Coordinates: 47.8381°N 103.6432°W
- Country: United States
- State: North Dakota
- County: McKenzie
- Founded: July 24, 1905
- Incorporated (village): May 18, 1914
- Incorporated (city): July 1, 1967
- Named after: Alexander McKenzie

Government
  - Type: Mayor–council
  - Mayor: Kenneth Willcox

Area
  - Total: 1.251 sq mi (3.240 km^{2})
  - Land: 1.242 sq mi (3.216 km^{2})
  - Water: 0.0089 sq mi (0.023 km^{2}) 0.72%
- Elevation: 2,172 ft (662 m)

Population (2020)
  - Total: 319
  - Estimate (2025): 325
  - Density: 257/sq mi (99.2/km^{2})
- Time zone: UTC–6 (Central (CST))
  - Summer (DST): UTC–5 (CDT)
- ZIP Code: 58831
- Area code: 701
- FIPS code: 38-01180
- GNIS feature ID: 1035903
- Highways: US 85, US 85 Bus.
- Website: cityofalexandernd.com

Alexander is a city in McKenzie County, North Dakota, United States. The population was 319 as of the 2020 census, and was estimated at 325 in 2025.

== History ==
Alexander was founded on July 24, 1905 and is named after early North Dakota politician Alexander McKenzie. Alexander was incorporated as a village on May 18, 1914 and as a city on July 1, 1967.

== Geography ==
According to the United States Census Bureau, the city has a total area of 1.251 square miles (3.24 km^{2}), of which 1.242 square miles (3.22 km^{2}) is land and 0.009 square miles (0.023 km^{2}) (0.72%) is water.

== Climate ==
This climatic region is typified by large seasonal temperature differences, with warm to hot (and often humid) summers and cold (sometimes severely cold) winters. According to the Köppen Climate Classification system, Alexander has a semi-arid to humid continental climate, abbreviated "BSk" to "DFb" on climate maps.

== Demographics ==
Historical population
Census	Pop.	Note	%±
1930	386		—
1940	415		7.5%
1950	302		−27.2%
1960	269		−10.9%
1970	208		−22.7%
1980	358		72.1%
1990	216		−39.7%
2000	217		0.5%
2010	223		2.8%
2020	319		43.0%
2025 (est.)	325		1.9%
U.S. Decennial Census; 2020 Census

As of the 2024 American Community Survey, there were 127 estimated households in Alexander with an average of 2.01 persons per household. The city has a median household income of $121,953. Approximately 0.4% of the city's population lives at or below the poverty line. Alexander has an estimated 76.8% employment rate, with 11.8% of the population holding a bachelor's degree or higher and 83.4% holding a high school diploma. There were 151 housing units at an average density of 121.58 per square mile (46.9/km^{2}).

The top five reported languages (people were allowed to report up to two languages, thus the figures will generally add to more than 100%) were English (99.2%), Spanish (0.4%), Indo-European (0.0%), Asian and Pacific Islander (0.4%), and Other (0.0%).

The median age in the city was 34.5 years.

Alexander, North Dakota – racial and ethnic composition Note: the US Census treats Hispanic/Latino as an ethnic category. This table excludes Latinos from the racial categories and assigns them to a separate category. Hispanics/Latinos may be of any race.
Race / ethnicity (NH = non-Hispanic)	Pop. 2000	Pop. 2010	Pop. 2020	% 2000	% 2010	% 2020
White alone (NH)	201	198	291	92.63%	88.79%	91.22%
Black or African American alone (NH)	0	0	0	0.00%	0.00%	0.00%
Native American or Alaska Native alone (NH)	13	11	7	5.99%	4.93%	2.19%
Asian alone (NH)	0	0	0	0.00%	0.00%	0.00%
Pacific Islander alone (NH)	0	0	0	0.00%	0.00%	0.00%
Other race alone (NH)	0	0	2	0.00%	0.00%	0.63%
Mixed race or multiracial (NH)	0	3	15	0.00%	1.35%	4.70%
Hispanic or Latino (any race)	3	11	4	1.38%	4.93%	1.25%
Total	217	223	319	100.00%	100.00%	100.00%

=== 2020 census ===
As of the 2020 census, there were 319 people, 122 households, and 87 families residing in the city. The population density was 256.84 inhabitants per square mile (99.17/km^{2}). There were 147 housing units at an average density of 118.36 per square mile (45.70/km^{2}). The racial makeup of the city was 91.22% White, 0.00% African American, 2.19% Native American, 0.00% Asian, 0.00% Pacific Islander, 0.63% from some other races and 5.96% from two or more races. Hispanic or Latino people of any race were 1.25% of the population.

=== 2010 census ===
As of the 2010 census, there were 223 people, 100 households, and 60 families residing in the city. The population density was 156.05 inhabitants per square mile (60.3/km^{2}). There were 120 housing units at an average density of 83.97 per square mile (32.4/km^{2}). The racial makeup of the city was 91.48% White, 1.79% African American, 4.93% Native American, 0.00% Asian, 0.00% Pacific Islander, 0.45% from some other races and 1.35% from two or more races. Hispanic or Latino people of any race were 4.93% of the population.

There were 100 households, of which 21.0% had children under the age of 18 living with them, 48.0% were married couples living together, 5.0% had a female householder with no husband present, 7.0% had a male householder with no wife present, and 40.0% were non-families. 32.0% of all households were made up of individuals, and 15% had someone living alone who was 65 years of age or older. The average household size was 2.23 and the average family size was 2.82.

The median age in the city was 43.3 years. 18.4% of residents were under the age of 18; 9% were between the ages of 18 and 24; 25.1% were from 25 to 44; 32.3% were from 45 to 64; and 15.2% were 65 years of age or older. The gender makeup of the city was 55.6% male and 44.4% female.

=== 2000 census ===
As of the 2000 census, there were 217 people, 87 households, and 60 families residing in the city. The population density was 150.64 inhabitants per square mile (58.2/km^{2}). There were 106 housing units at an average density of 73.59 per square mile (28.4/km^{2}). The racial makeup of the city was 93.55% White, 0.00% African American, 5.99% Native American, 0.00% Asian, 0.00% Pacific Islander, 0.46% from some other races and 0.00% from two or more races. Hispanic or Latino people of any race were 1.38% of the population.

The top 6 ancestry groups in the city are Norwegian (49.3%), German (32.7%), Irish (18.0%), English (8.3%), Swedish (7.4%), and Dutch (4.1%).

There were 87 households, out of which 32.2% had children under the age of 18 living with them, 59.8% were married couples living together, 4.6% had a female householder with no husband present, and 31.0% were non-families. 28.7% of all households were made up of individuals, and 10.3% had someone living alone who was 65 years of age or older. The average household size was 2.49 and the average family size was 3.08.

The median income for a household in the city was $26,042, and the median income for a family was $35,625. Males had a median income of $25,000 versus $20,000 for females. The per capita income for the city was $11,630. About 15.9% of families and 20.3% of the population were below the poverty line, including 24.7% of those under the age of eighteen and 21.1% of those 65 or over.

== Education ==
The Alexander Public School District 2 was organized in 1905.

The area is served by the Alexander Public School District 2. It operates the Alexander School. In the 2025-26 academic year, the district reported a total of 332 students.

== Notable person ==
- Arthur A. Link (May 24, 1914 - June 1, 2010), 27th governor of North Dakota
