= Outram, Saskatchewan =

Community in Saskatchewan, Canada

Outram Outram Station
- Unincorporated community
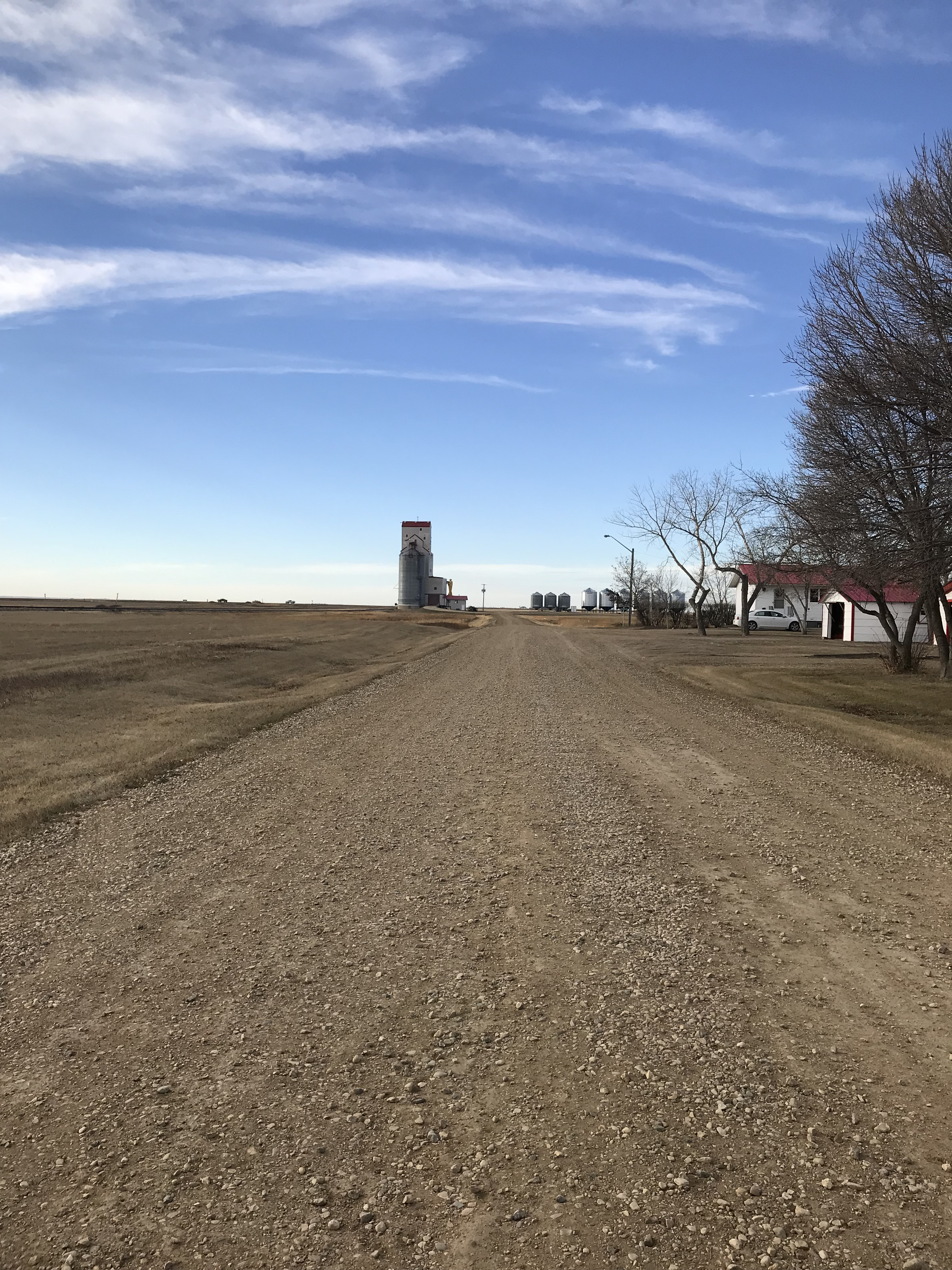

- Location of Outram Outram (Canada)
- Coordinates: 49°09′00″N 103°19′00″W
- Country: Canada
- Province: Saskatchewan
- Census division: 2
- Rural Municipality: Cambria
- Post office Founded: 1914
- Time zone: CST
- Area code: 306
- Highways: Highway 18
- Railway: Long Creek Railroad
- Website: www.rmcambria.com

Outram is an unincorporated community in the Rural Municipality of Cambria No. 6, Saskatchewan, Canada. It is situated on Highway 18 between Estevan and Torquay, Saskatchewan along the Long Creek Railroad.

== History ==
In 1912 the Estevan Neptune Railroad branch (originally called the Estevan and Forward branch) of the Canadian Pacific Railway passed through what was to become Outram. The first train to run on the line was on Sept.24, 1913. The following year, Outram Station 49° 8′ 42″ N, 103° 19′ 32″ W became the name of the second railway station west of Estevan. In the years following, an elevator was built. A post office (May 1, 1914) was established at Sec 19, Twp 2, Rge 10, W2 in a private residence, a general store opened and in 1957 a curling rink was erected. Outram was also the original home of the R.M. of Cambria municipal office before being moved to Torquay in 1915. In 1914 the Outram Rural Telephone Company was formed. Outram was also home to a United Church which closed in 1966.

On July 17, 1916, a tornado swept through Outram and several other communities, causing extensive damage and killing a man on a farm near Outram when he was caught under the falling roof of a barn.

The Saskatchewan Water Safety Agency's oldest observation well in Saskatchewan is located in Outram. The well was completed in 1961 to depth of 111.25 metres.

=== Relief landing field – RCAF Station Estevan ===
A Relief Landing field for RCAF Station Estevan was located northeast of Outram. The airport was built by the Commonwealth Air Training Scheme for the purpose of training pilots during World War 2 and operated from 27 April 1942 – 11 February 1944. The Relief field was constructed in the typical triangular pattern. In approximately 1942 the aerodrome was listed as RCAF Aerodrome - Outram, Saskatchewan at 49°08′N 103°15′W with a variation of 16 degrees east and elevation of 1,895 ft (578 m). Three runways were listed as follows:

Runway Name	Length	Width	Surface
18/36	2,700 ft (820 m)	150 ft (46 m)	Hard surfaced
12/30	2,700 ft (820 m)	1,500 ft (460 m)	Hard surfaced
6/24	2,700 ft (820 m)	150 ft (46 m)	Hard surfaced

A review of Google Maps in June 2018 shows a triangular pattern consistent with a now cultivated BCATP Aerodrome. But the coordinates stated above appear to be slightly off. Corrected coordinates are 49.130406°N 103.265059°W

=== WWII Veterans ===
George William Boyer (Royal Canadian Navy)

Louis Blondeau (Aircraftman 1st Class)

=== WWI Veterans ===
Archibald Christopher Murray

=== Local Inventors ===
Outram inventors and entrepreneurs Sidney Ellis Turner, store owner and postmaster, as well as the local grain buyer for the Saskatchewan Wheat Pool Elevator, Harold L. Tilley, were granted Canadian Patent no 286355 in 1929 for a new locking nut and bolt.

=== List of Postmasters ===
The following is a list of postmasters at the Outram Station Post Office (1914–1956) and the Outram Post Office (1956–81)

Name	Appointed	Vacancy
E. C. Erickson	1914-05-01	1915-05-13
Mrs. Olga Crave	1915-05-15	1915-10-04
Edwin C. Erickson	1915-11-15	1919-09-27
Halvor O. Moe	1920-11-29	1922-01-26
Kristian Kittelson	1922-05-04	1923-03-19
Sidney Ellis Turner	1923-05-11	1945-03-31
Dmytro Rudy	1945-04-30	Acting
Dmytro Rudy	1946-05-08	1946-10-21
John Kiniak	1946-11-01	Acting
John Kiniak	1947-02-03	1981-01-19

== Cemeteries ==
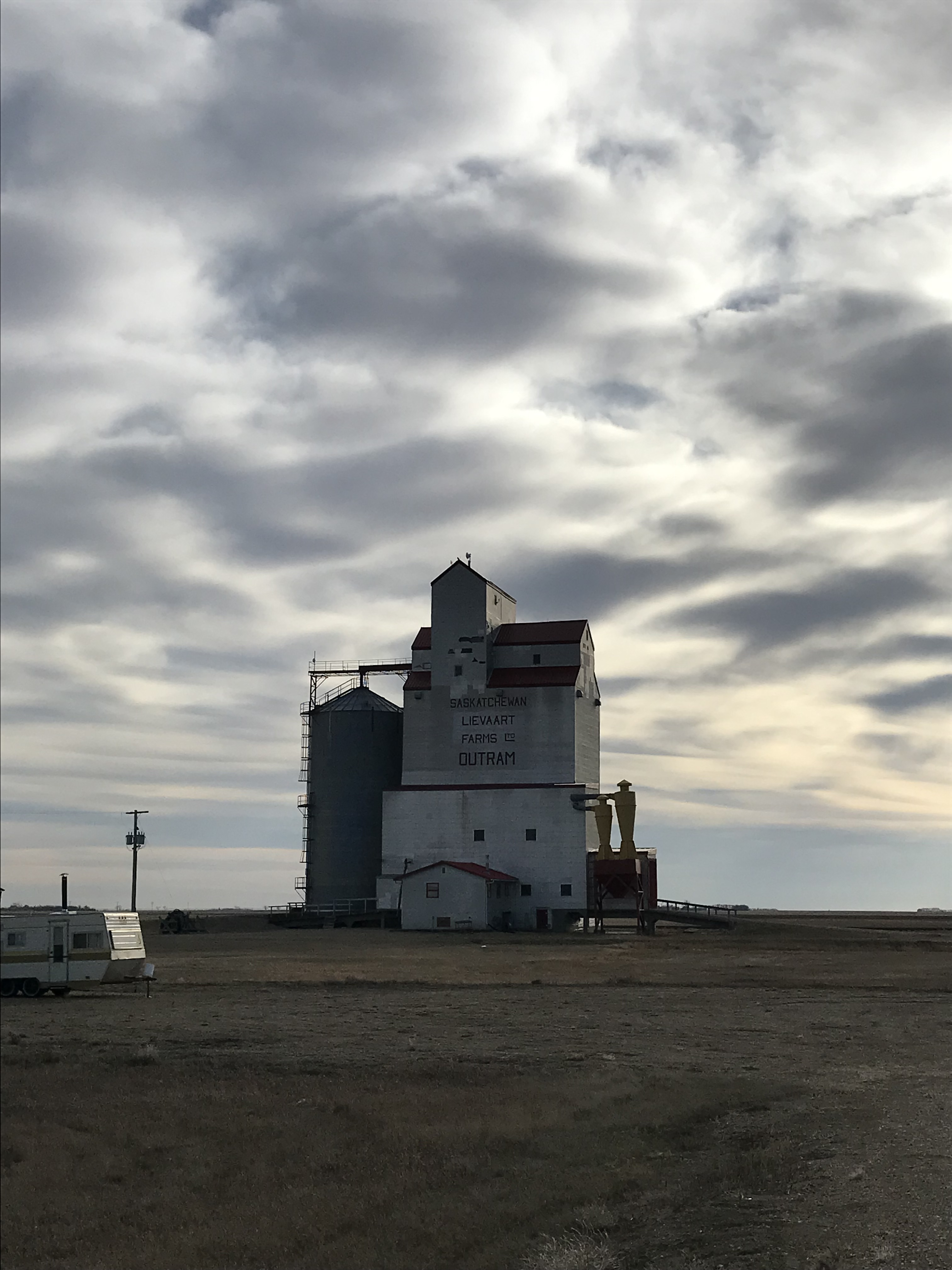
Grain elevator in Outram, Saskatchewan

Bethel & St. John's Cemetery, located 10 km south of Outram, in the RM of Cambria, is home to approximately 60 graves. It was established in 1910 by Norwegian homesteaders. A church, St. John's, was later established (1948) by German immigrants after they had purchased the land.

== Schools ==
Over the years, the Outram area was home to several schools, including;

- Kolke (School district #2325)
- Outram (School district #1792)
- Tedford (School district #1792)
- Dale (School district #1391)

== See also ==
- List of ghost towns in Saskatchewan
- List of communities in Saskatchewan
