= Fortuna, North Dakota =

- City
- Location of Fortuna, North Dakota

- Location in the United States
- Coordinates: 48°54′36″N 103°46′42″W
- Country: United States
- State: North Dakota
- County: Divide
- Founded: 1913

Area
  - Total: 1.02 sq mi (2.64 km^{2})
  - Land: 1.00 sq mi (2.60 km^{2})
  - Water: 0.012 sq mi (0.03 km^{2})
- Elevation: 2,202 ft (671 m)

Population (2020)
  - Total: 30
  - Density: 29.8/sq mi (11.52/km^{2})
- Time zone: UTC-6 (CST)
  - Summer (DST): UTC-5 (CDT)
- ZIP code: 58844
- Area code: 701
- FIPS code: 38-27820
- GNIS feature ID: 1036042

Fortuna is a city in Divide County, North Dakota, United States. The population was 30 at the 2020 census.

Fortuna was founded in 1913 along a Soo Line Railroad branch line running between Flaxton, North Dakota and Whitetail, Montana. The name comes from the Roman goddess of fortune and was chosen by railroad officials to note the settlers' expectations of prosperity with the arrival of the railroad.

The city is located six miles from the Canada–US border and is the northernmost city on U.S. Route 85 before it crosses into Canada at Port of Oungre, Saskatchewan.

Fortuna has the latest sunset time several days after the summer solstice in the contiguous 48 states. The sun sets at 10:03:24 PM Central Daylight Time (CDT) on June 25, 2025. This is due to Fortuna's location at the far western edge of the Central Time Zone. Although other communities in the contiguous 48 states are located farther north, none of them are located as far west in their respective time zones. Fortuna's westerly location in the time zone gives it the latest local time when the sun sets near the summer solstice.

== Geography ==
According to the United States Census Bureau, the city has a total area of 1.01 square miles (2.62 km^{2}), of which 1.00 square mile (2.59 km^{2}) is land and 0.01 square miles (0.03 km^{2}) is water.

== Demographics ==
Historical population
Census	Pop.	Note	%±
1920	198		—
1930	196		−1.0%
1940	214		9.2%
1950	181		−15.4%
1960	185		2.2%
1970	216		16.8%
1980	98		−54.6%
1990	53		−45.9%
2000	31		−41.5%
2010	22		−29.0%
2020	30		36.4%
2021 (est.)	31		3.3%
U.S. Decennial Census; 2020 Census

=== 2010 census ===
As of the census of 2010, there were 22 people, 14 households, and 3 families residing in the city. The population density was 22.0 inhabitants per square mile (8.5/km^{2}). There were 26 housing units at an average density of 26.0 per square mile (10.0/km^{2}). The racial makeup of the city was 95.5% White and 4.5% from two or more races. Hispanic or Latino of any race were 4.5% of the population.

There were 14 households, of which 14.3% had children under the age of 18 living with them, 14.3% were married couples living together, 7.1% had a female householder with no husband present, and 78.6% were non-families. 64.3% of all households were made up of individuals, and 14.3% had someone living alone who was 65 years of age or older. The average household size was 1.57 and the average family size was 3.00.

The median age in the city was 50.5 years. 18.2% of residents were under the age of 18; 9% were between the ages of 18 and 24; 18.1% were from 25 to 44; 36.3% were from 45 to 64; and 18.2% were 65 years of age or older. The gender makeup of the city was 54.5% male and 45.5% female.

=== 2000 census ===
As of the census of 2000, there were 31 people, 17 households, and 8 families residing in the city. The population density was 31.0 inhabitants per square mile (12.0/km^{2}). There were 39 housing units at an average density of 39.0 per square mile (15.1/km^{2}). The racial makeup of the city was 100.00% White. Hispanic or Latino of any race were 3.23% of the population.

There were 17 households, out of which 17.6% had children under the age of 18 living with them, 35.3% were married couples living together, 5.9% had a female householder with no husband present, and 52.9% were non-families. 52.9% of all households were made up of individuals, and 23.5% had someone living alone who was 65 years of age or older. The average household size was 1.82 and the average family size was 2.75.

In the city, the population was spread out, with 19.4% under the age of 18, 29.0% from 25 to 44, 22.6% from 45 to 64, and 29.0% who were 65 years of age or older. The median age was 46 years. For every 100 females, there were 121.4 males. For every 100 females age 18 and over, there were 150.0 males.

The median income for a household in the city was $13,542, and the median income for a family was $20,625. Males had a median income of $32,917 versus $13,750 for females. The per capita income for the city was $8,502. There were 45.5% of families and 54.0% of the population living below the poverty line, including 100.0% of under eighteens and 25.0% of those over 64.

== Climate ==
Fortuna experiences a dry continental climate (Köppen Dfb) with long, dry, very cold winters and very warm, wetter summers.

Climate data for Fortuna 1 W, North Dakota (1991–2020 normals, extremes 1963–present)
Month	Jan	Feb	Mar	Apr	May	Jun	Jul	Aug	Sep	Oct	Nov	Dec	Year
Record high °F (°C)	59 (15)	64 (18)	76 (24)	90 (32)	100 (38)	103 (39)	106 (41)	105 (41)	102 (39)	91 (33)	73 (23)	53 (12)	106 (41)
Mean maximum °F (°C)	40.8 (4.9)	42.0 (5.6)	56.7 (13.7)	75.9 (24.4)	84.4 (29.1)	89.2 (31.8)	93.2 (34.0)	94.9 (34.9)	89.9 (32.2)	76.6 (24.8)	57.0 (13.9)	41.8 (5.4)	96.5 (35.8)
Mean daily maximum °F (°C)	17.1 (−8.3)	21.4 (−5.9)	34.3 (1.3)	51.7 (10.9)	64.7 (18.2)	73.0 (22.8)	79.6 (26.4)	79.9 (26.6)	69.0 (20.6)	52.5 (11.4)	34.6 (1.4)	22.4 (−5.3)	50.0 (10.0)
Daily mean °F (°C)	7.3 (−13.7)	11.6 (−11.3)	24.0 (−4.4)	39.2 (4.0)	51.7 (10.9)	61.1 (16.2)	66.8 (19.3)	65.7 (18.7)	55.0 (12.8)	40.2 (4.6)	24.7 (−4.1)	12.9 (−10.6)	38.3 (3.5)
Mean daily minimum °F (°C)	−2.5 (−19.2)	1.7 (−16.8)	13.8 (−10.1)	26.6 (−3.0)	38.7 (3.7)	49.2 (9.6)	54.0 (12.2)	51.5 (10.8)	40.9 (4.9)	27.8 (−2.3)	14.7 (−9.6)	3.4 (−15.9)	26.6 (−3.0)
Mean minimum °F (°C)	−27.5 (−33.1)	−20.8 (−29.3)	−10.8 (−23.8)	10.2 (−12.1)	25.0 (−3.9)	37.4 (3.0)	43.3 (6.3)	39.6 (4.2)	25.9 (−3.4)	11.8 (−11.2)	−6.0 (−21.1)	−21.2 (−29.6)	−31.1 (−35.1)
Record low °F (°C)	−44 (−42)	−44 (−42)	−33 (−36)	−11 (−24)	14 (−10)	22 (−6)	38 (3)	31 (−1)	19 (−7)	−5 (−21)	−26 (−32)	−45 (−43)	−45 (−43)
Average precipitation inches (mm)	0.62 (16)	0.46 (12)	0.62 (16)	1.15 (29)	2.06 (52)	3.30 (84)	2.43 (62)	1.46 (37)	1.18 (30)	1.03 (26)	0.54 (14)	0.48 (12)	15.33 (389)
Average snowfall inches (cm)	6.6 (17)	5.7 (14)	7.0 (18)	3.4 (8.6)	0.9 (2.3)	0.0 (0.0)	0.0 (0.0)	0.0 (0.0)	0.0 (0.0)	2.2 (5.6)	4.3 (11)	6.4 (16)	36.5 (93)
Average precipitation days (≥ 0.01 in)	2.4	2.2	2.7	3.2	5.7	9.7	6.7	4.7	3.3	2.7	1.7	2.5	47.5
Average snowy days (≥ 0.1 in)	2.2	2.2	2.2	1.1	0.2	0.0	0.0	0.0	0.0	0.7	1.4	2.5	12.5
Source: NOAA
