= Special routes of U.S. Route 85 =

Special routes of U.S. Route 85

Highway system
- United States Numbered Highway System; List; Special; Divided

There are a number of special routes of U.S. Route 85. These special routes connect U.S. Route 85 to downtown areas, bypass city centers or provide alternate routes around an area.

== Current routes ==
=== Fort Lupton, Colorado ===
U.S. Highway 85 Business
- Location: Fort Lupton, Colorado

U.S. Route 85 Business in Fort Lupton, Colorado is a business spur that follows SH 52 east from US 85 to Denver Avenue, then turns north onto Denver Ave. and ends at Weld County Road 16 north of town.

Major intersections

The entire route is in Weld County.

Location	mi	km	Destinations	Notes
Fort Lupton	0.000	0.000	SH 52 west / US 85	Interchange with US 85; western terminus; west end of SH 52 concurrency; highway continues as SH 52 west
Fort Lupton	0.525	0.845	SH 52 east (First Street east)	East end of SH 52 concurrency
	2.040	3.283	CR 16	Northern terminus
1.000 mi = 1.609 km; 1.000 km = 0.621 mi: Concurrency terminus

=== Platteville, Colorado ===
U.S. Highway 85 Business
- Location: Platteville, Colorado

U.S. Route 85 Business in Platteville, Colorado is a business spur that goes from the intersection with Weld County Road 28 south of town to US 85 in north Platteville.

Major intersections

The entire route is in Weld County.

Location	mi	km	Destinations	Notes
	0.000	0.000	CR 28	Southern terminus; road continues unpaved as CR 25.5
Platteville	1.238	1.992	SH 66 (Justin Avenue) to US 85	
Platteville	2.69	4.33	US 85 south	Northern terminus; no access to/from US 85 north
1.000 mi = 1.609 km; 1.000 km = 0.621 mi: Incomplete access

=== Greeley, Colorado ===
U.S. Highway 85 Business
- Location: Greeley, Colorado

U.S. Route 85 Business in Greeley, Colorado is a business route that begins at the Garden City Connector in Evans, Colorado, and runs north into Greeley. At 23rd Street, it joins 8th Avenue and heads north until it terminates at US 85 at the northeast edge of the city.

Major intersections

The entire route is in Weld County.

Location	mi	km	Destinations	Notes
Evans	0.000	0.000	US 85 south	Continuation beyond southern terminus
Evans	0.212– 0.622	0.341– 1.001	US 34 / US 85 – Loveland, Ft. Morgan	Interchange; northbound exit and entrance to/from US 34 west, southbound exit and northbound entrance to/from US 34 east/US 85
Greeley	1.629	2.622	US 34 Bus. east (18th Street)	South end of US 34 Bus. concurrency
Greeley	2.456	3.953	10th Street (US 34 Bus. west)	North end of US 34 Bus. concurrency
Greeley	4.487– 4.670	7.221– 7.516	US 85 north	Continuation beyond northern terminus
1.000 mi = 1.609 km; 1.000 km = 0.621 mi: Concurrency terminus; Incomplete access

=== Torrington, Wyoming ===
U.S. Highway 85 Business
- Location: Torrington, Wyoming
- Length: 0.5 mi (800 m)
- Existed: 2013–present

U.S. Route 85 Business in Torrington, Wyoming is a route that goes through the southern highway commercial area of Torrington. It was established in 2014 when US 85 was realigned to an overpass over the UPRR/BNFF mainline railway. It terminates at the US 26/US 85 concurrency just south of the downtown area.

=== Lead–Deadwood, South Dakota ===
U.S. Highway 85 Truck
- Location: Lead–Deadwood, South Dakota

U.S. Route 85 Truck (US 85 Truck) is a truck route that travels from the downtowns of Lead and Deadwood, South Dakota, and is entirely concurrent with US 14 Alternate (US 14 Alt.).

=== Watford City, North Dakota ===
U.S. Highway 85 Business
- Location: Watford City, North Dakota
- Length: 6.233 mi (10.031 km)

U.S. Route 85 Business in Watford City, North Dakota is a route that goes into the downtown area of Watford City.

The entire route is in Watford City, McKenzie County.

mi	km	Destinations	Notes
0.000	0.000	US 85 / ND 200 / ND 23 ends	Southern terminus, western terminus of ND 23
0.555	0.893	ND 23 east / ND 23 Bus. begins	Northern end of ND 23 concurrency, southern end of ND 23 Bus. concurrency
2.486	4.001	ND 23A east	Western terminus of ND 23A
2.707	4.356	ND 23 Bus. east / Lewis and Clark Trail	Northern end of ND 23 Bus. concurrency
6.233	10.031	US 85 / ND 200 / Lewis and Clark Trail	Northern terminus
1.000 mi = 1.609 km; 1.000 km = 0.621 mi: Concurrency terminus

=== Alexander, North Dakota ===
U.S. Highway 85 Business
- Location: Alexander, North Dakota
- Length: 2.921 mi (4.701 km)

U.S. Route 85 Business in Alexander, North Dakota is a route that goes into the downtown area of Alexander.

Major intersections

The entire route is in Alexander, McKenzie County.

mi	km	Destinations	Notes
0.000	0.000	US 85 / ND 200 – Watford City, Williston	Southern terminus
2.921	4.701	US 85 / ND 200 – Watford City, Williston	Northern terminus
1.000 mi = 1.609 km; 1.000 km = 0.621 mi

=== Williams County, North Dakota ===
U.S. Highway 85B
- Location: Williston, North Dakota
- Length: 8.97 mi (14.44 km)

== Former routes ==
=== El Paso business loop ===
Business U.S. Highway 85
- Location: El Paso, Texas
- Existed: 1980s–1985

=== Anthony–Las Cruces alternate route ===
U.S. Highway 85 Alternate
- Location: Anthony–Las Cruces, New Mexico
- Existed: 1959–1960s

=== Santa Fe bypass route ===
U.S. Highway 85 Bypass
- Location: Santa Fe, New Mexico
- Existed: 1960s–1988

=== Barelas–Alameda alternate route ===
U.S. Highway 85 Alternate
- Location: Barelas–Alameda, New Mexico
- Existed: 1961–1980s

=== Fountain–Colorado Springs bypass route ===
U.S. Highway 85 Bypass
- Location: Fountain–Colorado Springs, Colorado
- Existed: 1958–1990s

=== Williston business route ===
U.S. Highway 85 Business
- Location: Williston, North Dakota

U.S. Route 85 Business (US 85) is a business route of US 85 in Williston, North Dakota. It went into the downtown area of Williston. This route is now US 2 Bus.
