= U.S. Route 85 in North Dakota =

Segment of American highway

U.S. Highway 85
- CanAm Highway
- US 85 highlighted in red

Route information
- Maintained by NDDOT
- Length: 255.063 mi (410.484 km)
- Existed: 1926–present

Major junctions
- South end: US 85 at the South Dakota state line south of Bowman
- US 12 in Bowman; I-94 in Belfield; ND 200 from near Grassy Butte to near Alexander; ND 23 / US 85 Bus. in Watford City; US 2 by Williston; ND 5 near Fortuna
- North end: Highway 35 at the Canadian border near Fortuna

Location
- Country: United States
- State: North Dakota
- Counties: Bowman, Slope, Stark, Billings, McKenzie, Williams, Divide

Highway system
- United States Numbered Highway System; List; Special; Divided; North Dakota State Highway System; Interstate; US; State
← US 83	→ ND 89

U.S. Highway 85 (US 85) is a part of the U.S. Highway System that travels from the Mexican border in El Paso, Texas, north to the Canadian border north of Fortuna. In the state of North Dakota, US 85 travels from the South Dakota state line south of Bowman north to the Canadian border.

== Route description ==
US 85 enters North Dakota in the southwest part of the state. The first city on its route is Bowman at the junction of US 12. Continuing north, it passes between North Dakota's two highest points, White Butte and Black Butte. Near Amidon US 85 heads east for nine miles (14 km) before going back north and junctions ND 21, along the Little Missouri National Grassland for about 125 miles (201 km). In Belfield it junctions with Interstate 94 (I-94), about 15 miles east of Medora and the Theodore Roosevelt National Park (South Unit). North of Belfield, US 85 passes through the unincorporated community of Fairfield. It meets North Dakota Highway 200 south of Grassy Butte. After running concurrently with ND 200, it eventually passes through part of the scenic Badlands, crosses the Little Missouri River at the Long X Bridge and passes near the Theodore Roosevelt National Park (North Unit).

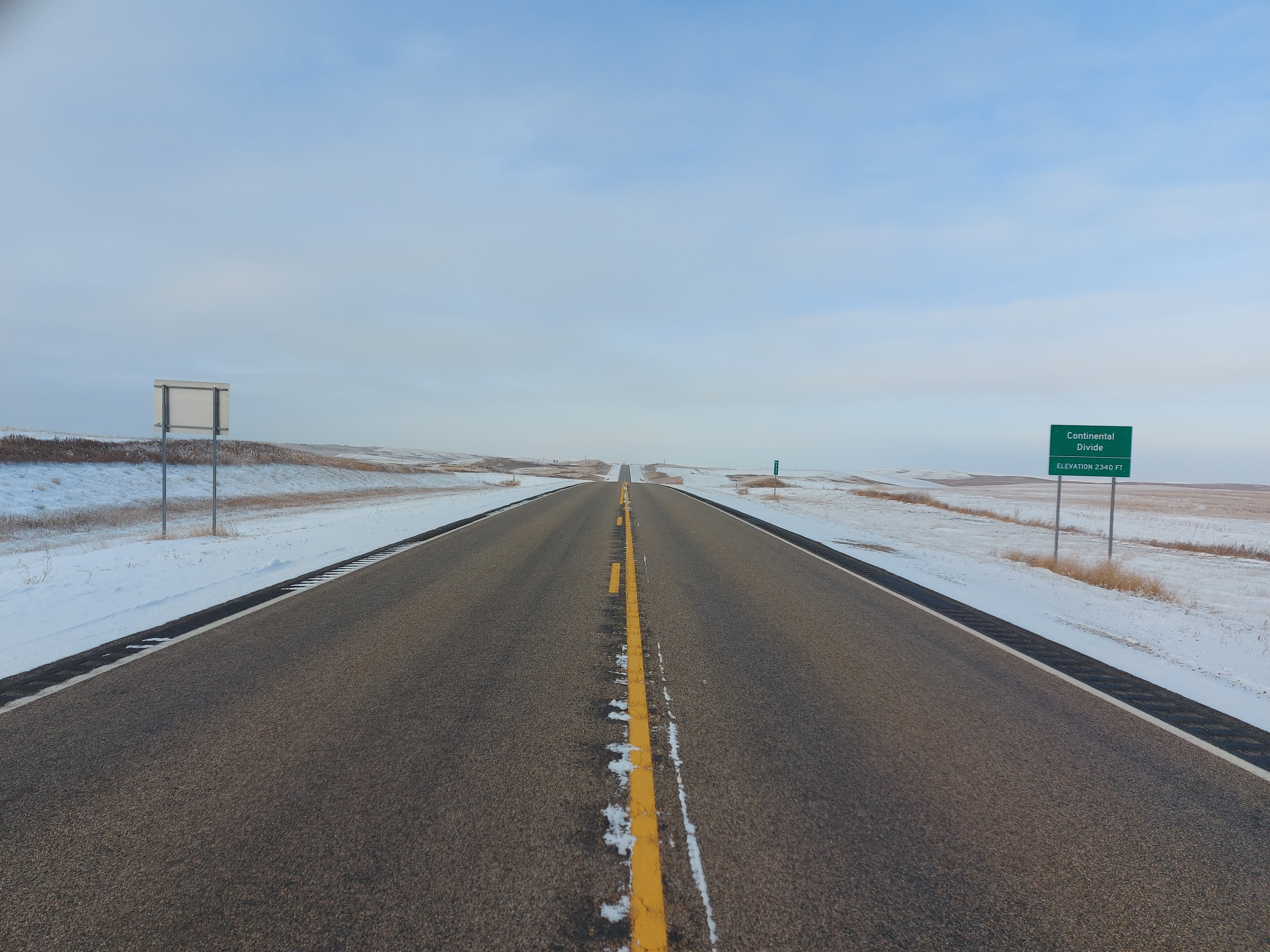
The Laurentian Divide along US 85, north of Williston

Then, at Watford City it travels west for 16 miles (26 km) past Arnegard and Rawson, until it junctions with ND 68, where it turns back north, while ND 68 turns south and then west towards Sidney, Montana, before Alexander. US 85 bypasses Alexander while US 85 Business serves the city. US 85 continues north as ND 200 turns west toward Montana. South of Williston it crosses the Missouri River. The stretch from Watford City to Williston is in the process of being converted into an undivided four-lane highway, and it should be substantially completed in 2014. A few miles later, it meets with US 2 west of Williston. US 85 continues as an expressway that bypasses Williston to the northwest near the Williston Basin International Airport, while US 2 goes into Williston. After US 2 heads east towards Minot, US 85 continues north to a concurrency with ND 5. From there it is seven miles (11 km) to Fortuna where US 85 heads back north for its remaining six miles (9.7 km) to the Canadian border.

== History ==
In October 2024, US 85 from I-94 to the Watford City bypass became four lanes. The North Dakota Department of Transportation is working on a plan to expand the south segment of US 85 from two to four lanes.

== Major intersections ==
County	Location	mi	km	Destinations	Notes
Bowman		0.000	0.000	US 85 south – Buffalo, Belle Fourche	Continuation into South Dakota
Bowman	Bowman	16.461	26.491	US 12 west – Rhame	Southern end of US 12 concurrency
Bowman	Bowman	17.265	27.785	US 12 east – Hettinger	Northern end of US 12 concurrency
Slope		50.098	80.625	ND 21 east – New England	Western terminus of ND 21
Stark	Belfield	75.762	121.927	I-94 – Bismarck, Billings	I-94 Exit 42
Billings	No major junctions				
McKenzie		107.645	173.238	ND 200 east – Killdeer	Southern end of ND 200 concurrency
McKenzie	Watford City	140.831	226.646	US 85 Bus. north / ND 23 east – Watford City, New Town	Southern terminus of US 85 Bus., western terminus of ND 23
McKenzie		145.659	234.415	US 85 Bus. south – Watford City	Northern terminus of US 85 Bus.
McKenzie		159.344	256.439	ND 68 west – Sidney	Eastern terminus of ND 68
McKenzie	Alexander	160.505	258.308	US 85 Bus. north – Alexander	Southern terminus of US 85 Bus.
McKenzie	Alexander	163.506	263.137	US 85 Bus. south – Alexander	Northern terminus of US 85 Bus.
McKenzie		164.424	264.615	ND 200 west – Fairview, Sidney	Northern end of ND 200 concurrency
Williams		183.743	295.706	US 2 west / ND 1804 north – Bainville	Southern end of US 2 and ND 1804 concurrency
Williams	Williston	186.747	300.540	US 2 Bus. east / ND 1804 south	Northern end of ND 1804 concurrency, western terminus of US 2 Bus.
Williams	Williston	189.207	304.499	US 2 Bus. west	Eastern terminus of US 2 Bus.
Williams		201.265	323.905	US 2 east	Northern end of US 2 concurrency
Williams		216.995	349.220	ND 50	
Divide		240.605	387.216	ND 5 east – Crosby	Southern end of ND 5 concurrency
Divide	Fortuna	248.670	400.196	ND 5 west – Westby	Northern end of ND 5 concurrency
Divide		255.063	410.484	Canada–United States border at Fortuna–Oungre Border Crossing	
Divide		255.063	410.484	Highway 35 / CanAm Highway north – Weyburn, Regina	Continuation into Saskatchewan
1.000 mi = 1.609 km; 1.000 km = 0.621 mi: Concurrency terminus; Route transition

U.S. Route 85
Previous state: South Dakota	North Dakota	Next state: Terminus
