= Tribune, Saskatchewan =

Community in Saskatchewan, Canada

Tribune
- Unincorporated community
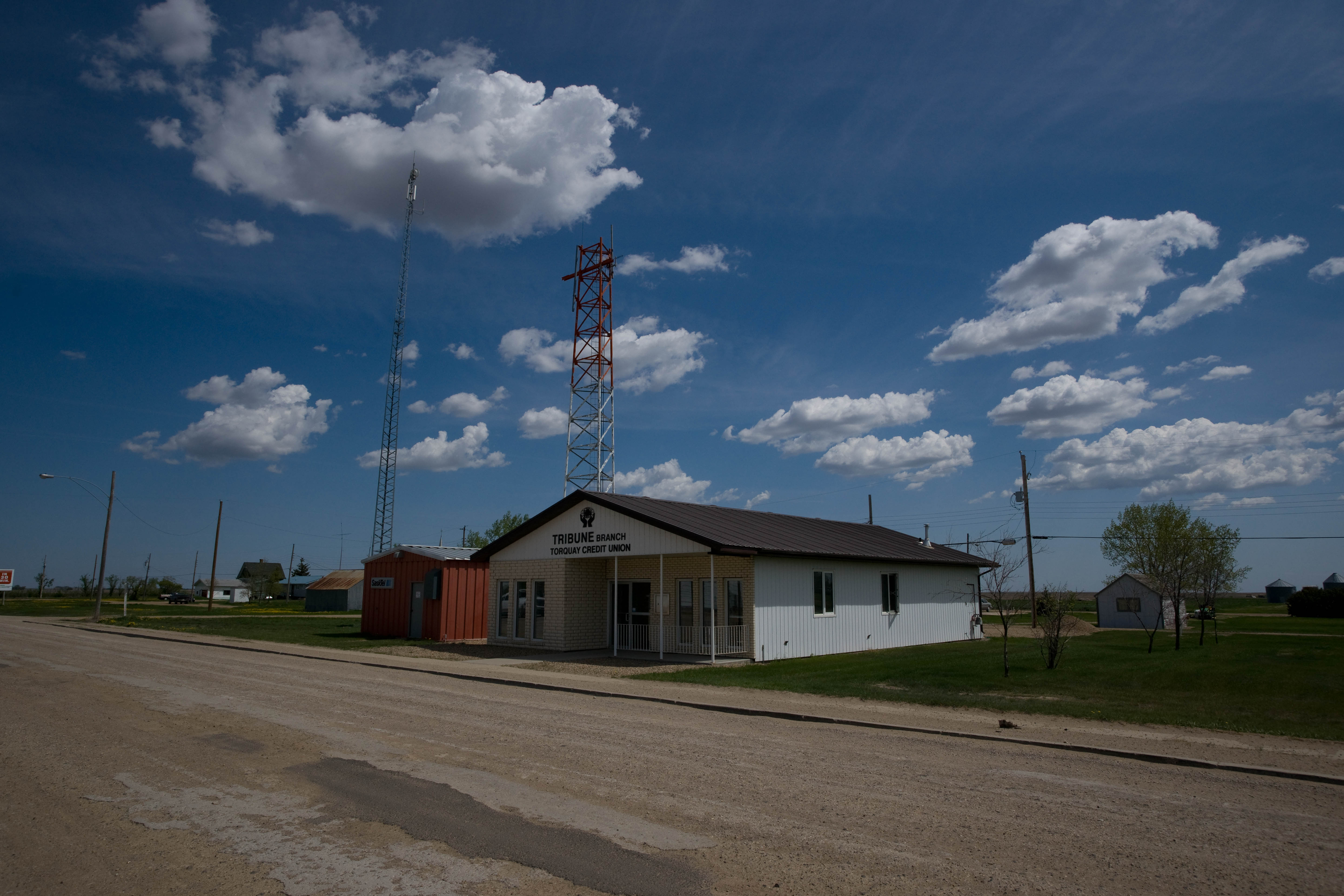
- Tribune, Saskatchewan

- Location within Saskatchewan Location within Canada
- Coordinates: 49.145443°N 103.492091°W
- Country: Canada
- Province: Saskatchewan
- Census division: 2
- Rural municipality: Souris Valley No. 7
- Incorporated (village): February 18, 1914
- Dissolved: December 31, 2017

Area (2016)
  - Land: 1.61 km^{2} (0.62 sq mi)

Population (2016)
  - Total: 45
  - Density: 27.9/km^{2} (72/sq mi)
- Time zone: UTC-6 (CST)
- Area code: 306
- Highway: 35

Tribune is an unincorporated community in the Rural Municipality of Souris Valley No. 7, Saskatchewan, Canada that held village status prior to 2018. It is located approximately 25 kilometres (16 mi) from the Canada–US border along Highway 35. In 2016, the population was 45.

== History ==
Tribune incorporated as a village on February 18, 1914. It restructured on December 31, 2017, relinquishing its village status in favour of becoming an unincorporated community under the jurisdiction of the Rural Municipality of Souris No. 7.

== Demographics ==
In the 2021 Census of Population conducted by Statistics Canada, Tribune had a population of 25 living in 10 of its 13 total private dwellings, a change of −44.4% from its 2016 population of 45. With a land area of 1.69 km^{2} (0.65 sq mi), it had a population density of 14.8/km^{2} (38.3/sq mi) in 2021.

In the 2016 Census of Population conducted by Statistics Canada, Tribune recorded a population of 45 living in 21 of its 21 total private dwellings, an 80% change from its 2011 population of 25. With a land area of 1.61 km^{2} (0.62 sq mi), it had a population density of 28.0/km^{2} (72.4/sq mi) in 2016.

== Transportation ==
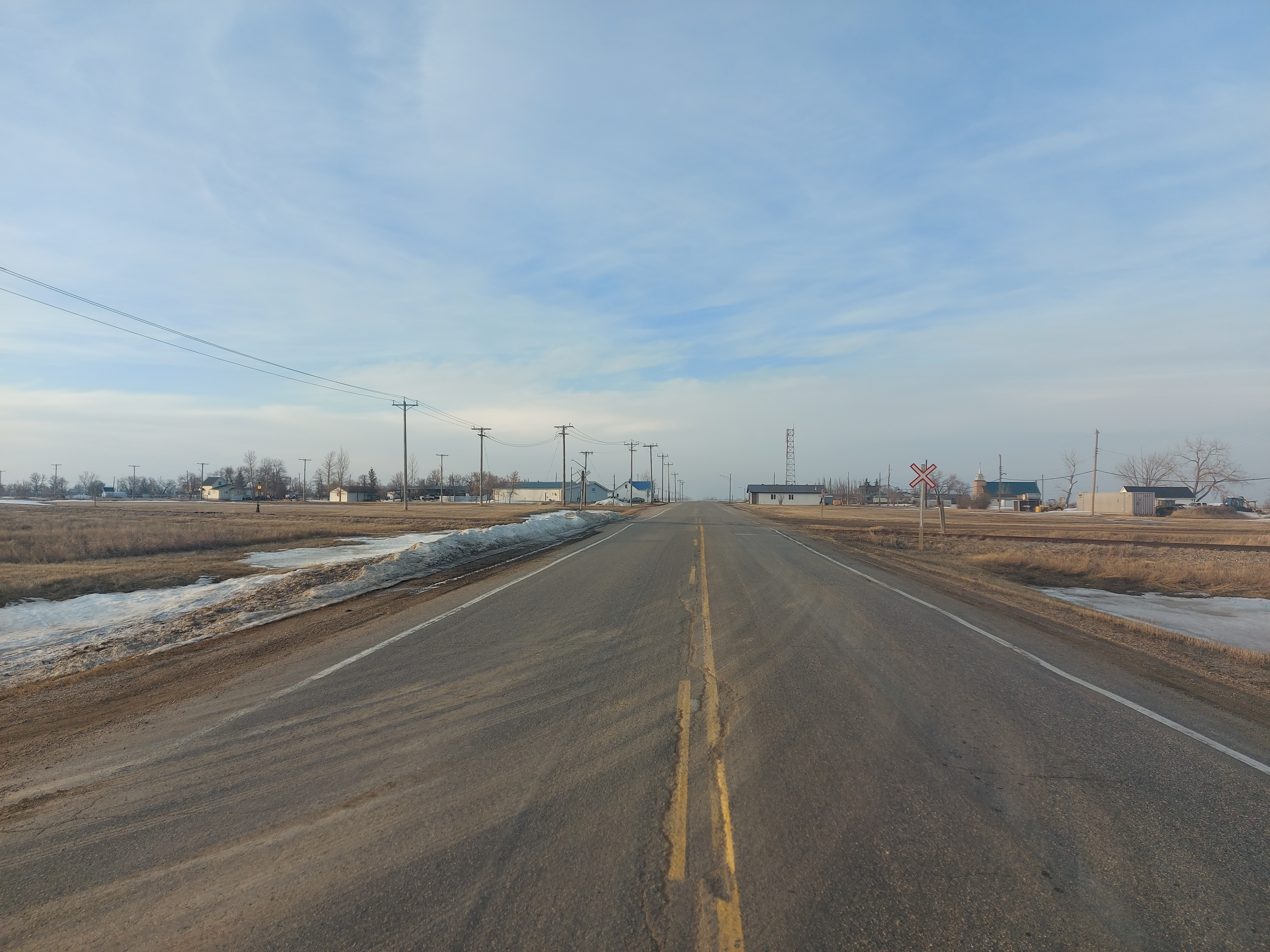
Highway 35 crossing Long Creek Railroad as it heads north into Tribune.

Tribune is situated along Highway 35 and Long Creek Railroad.

== See also ==
- List of communities in Saskatchewan
- List of special service areas in Saskatchewan
