= Longcreek, South Carolina =

Unincorporated community in Oconee County, South Carolina

Longcreek
- Census-designated place
- Interactive map of Longcreek
- Coordinates: 34°46′45″N 83°15′17″W
- Country: United States
- State: South Carolina
- County: Oconee

Area
  - Total: 1.92 sq mi (4.97 km^{2})
  - Land: 1.90 sq mi (4.91 km^{2})
  - Water: 0.023 sq mi (0.06 km^{2})
- Elevation: 1,621 ft (494 m)

Population (2020)
  - Total: 96
  - Density: 50.6/sq mi (19.54/km^{2})
- Time zone: UTC-5 (Eastern (EST))
  - Summer (DST): UTC-4 (EDT)
- ZIP code: 29658
- Area codes: 864, 821
- FIPS code: 45-42460
- GNIS feature ID: 2812983

Longcreek is an unincorporated community and census-designated place (CDP) in western Oconee County, South Carolina, United States. It was first listed as a CDP in the 2020 census with a population of 96.

It is located within the Sumter National Forest and is the location of the Long Creek Academy, which is on the National Register of Historic Places. Long Creek is between Westminster and the Georgia state line.

== Demographics ==
Historical population
Census	Pop.	Note	%±
2020	96		—
U.S. Decennial Census; 2020

Longcreek first appeared as a census designated place in the 2020 U.S. census.

=== 2020 census ===
Longcreek CDP, South Carolina – Demographic Profile (NH = Non-Hispanic)
Race / Ethnicity	Pop 2020	% 2020
White alone (NH)	91	94.79%
Black or African American alone (NH)	0	0.00%
Native American or Alaska Native alone (NH)	0	0.00%
Asian alone (NH)	0	0.00%
Pacific Islander alone (NH)	0	0.00%
Some Other Race alone (NH)	1	1.04%
Mixed Race/Multi-Racial (NH)	3	3.13%
Hispanic or Latino (any race)	1	1.04%
Total	96	100.00%

Note: the US Census treats Hispanic/Latino as an ethnic category. This table excludes Latinos from the racial categories and assigns them to a separate category. Hispanics/Latinos can be of any race.

== Climate ==
According to the Köppen Climate Classification system, Long Creek has a humid subtropical climate, abbreviated "Cfa" on climate maps. The hottest temperature recorded in Long Creek was 102 °F (38.9 °C) on July 28–29, 1952, while the coldest temperature recorded was −8 °F (−22.2 °C) on January 21, 1985.

Climate data for Long Creek, South Carolina, 1991–2020 normals, extremes 1942–present
Month	Jan	Feb	Mar	Apr	May	Jun	Jul	Aug	Sep	Oct	Nov	Dec	Year
Record high °F (°C)	77 (25)	78 (26)	90 (32)	90 (32)	95 (35)	100 (38)	102 (39)	101 (38)	98 (37)	93 (34)	78 (26)	76 (24)	102 (39)
Mean maximum °F (°C)	67.6 (19.8)	70.2 (21.2)	78.4 (25.8)	83.4 (28.6)	86.1 (30.1)	88.9 (31.6)	91.2 (32.9)	90.4 (32.4)	87.4 (30.8)	81.7 (27.6)	75.7 (24.3)	67.7 (19.8)	92.6 (33.7)
Mean daily maximum °F (°C)	50.2 (10.1)	53.6 (12.0)	61.1 (16.2)	69.7 (20.9)	76.1 (24.5)	81.8 (27.7)	85.1 (29.5)	83.7 (28.7)	78.6 (25.9)	69.9 (21.1)	60.9 (16.1)	53.2 (11.8)	68.7 (20.4)
Daily mean °F (°C)	40.1 (4.5)	43.0 (6.1)	49.7 (9.8)	57.8 (14.3)	65.2 (18.4)	71.8 (22.1)	75.0 (23.9)	73.9 (23.3)	68.4 (20.2)	58.4 (14.7)	49.6 (9.8)	42.8 (6.0)	58.0 (14.4)
Mean daily minimum °F (°C)	30.0 (−1.1)	32.4 (0.2)	38.2 (3.4)	45.8 (7.7)	54.3 (12.4)	61.7 (16.5)	65.0 (18.3)	64.1 (17.8)	58.3 (14.6)	46.9 (8.3)	38.2 (3.4)	32.3 (0.2)	47.3 (8.5)
Mean minimum °F (°C)	13.4 (−10.3)	17.3 (−8.2)	20.9 (−6.2)	31.9 (−0.1)	39.6 (4.2)	53.2 (11.8)	59.2 (15.1)	57.6 (14.2)	47.3 (8.5)	32.7 (0.4)	25.5 (−3.6)	20.1 (−6.6)	10.2 (−12.1)
Record low °F (°C)	−8 (−22)	−5 (−21)	5 (−15)	21 (−6)	29 (−2)	39 (4)	50 (10)	49 (9)	30 (−1)	22 (−6)	11 (−12)	−2 (−19)	−8 (−22)
Average precipitation inches (mm)	5.91 (150)	5.25 (133)	5.61 (142)	5.23 (133)	4.95 (126)	5.53 (140)	4.96 (126)	5.95 (151)	4.89 (124)	4.80 (122)	5.13 (130)	6.17 (157)	64.38 (1,634)
Average snowfall inches (cm)	0.5 (1.3)	1.3 (3.3)	0.6 (1.5)	0.0 (0.0)	0.0 (0.0)	0.0 (0.0)	0.0 (0.0)	0.0 (0.0)	0.0 (0.0)	0.0 (0.0)	0.0 (0.0)	0.4 (1.0)	2.8 (7.1)
Average precipitation days (≥ 0.01 in)	9.9	9.2	11.8	10.0	10.7	11.9	11.5	11.5	8.7	7.7	7.8	10.8	121.5
Average snowy days (≥ 0.1 in)	0.4	0.4	0.2	0.0	0.0	0.0	0.0	0.0	0.0	0.0	0.0	0.2	1.2
Source 1: NOAA
Source 2: National Weather Service
