= Bromhead, Saskatchewan =

Bromhead
- Unincorporated community
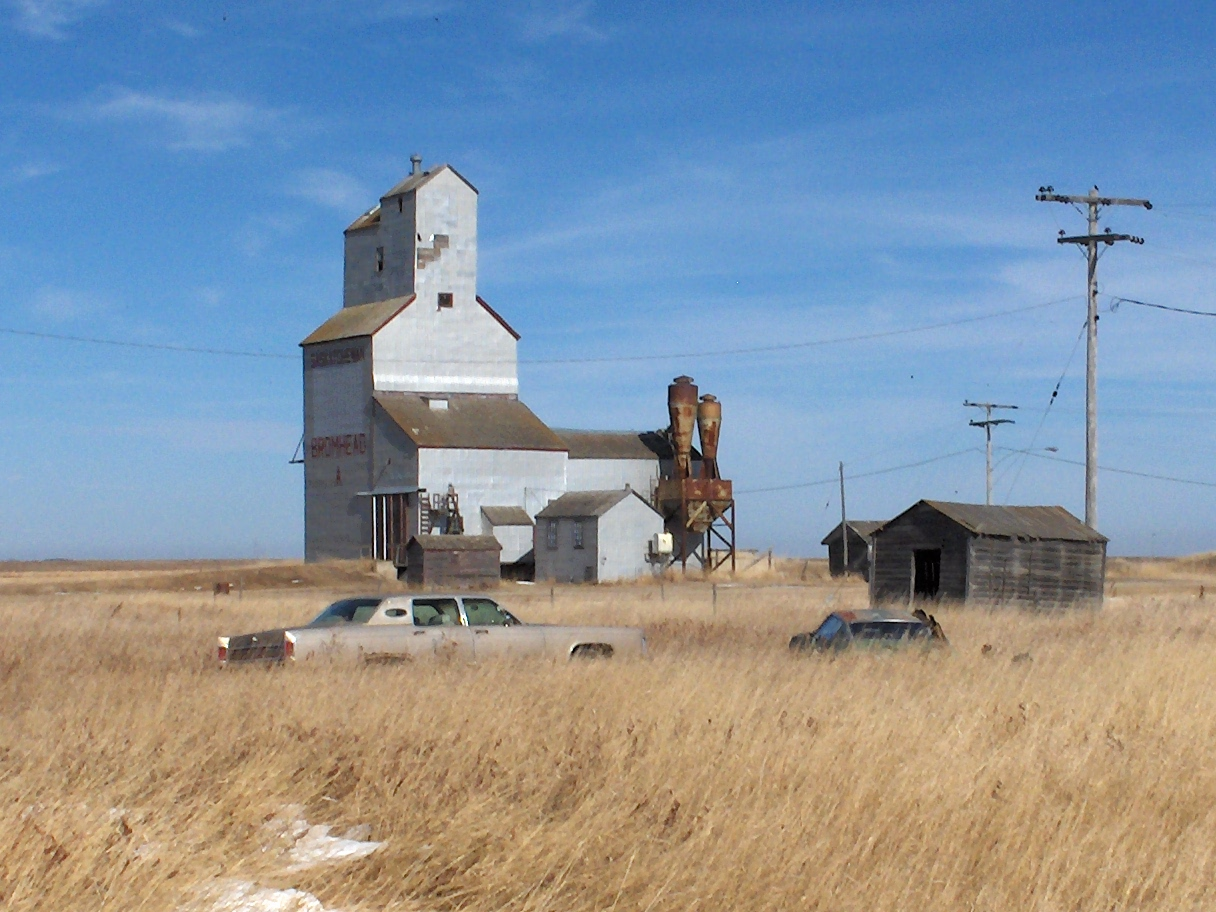
- Former Saskatchewan Wheat Pool elevator in Bromhead.

- Location within Saskatchewan Location within Canada
- Coordinates: 49°10′54″N 103°40′31″W
- Country: Canada
- Province: Saskatchewan
- Region: South-east
- Census division: 1
- Rural Municipality: Souris Valley
- Established: 1913

Government
  - Governing body: Souris Valley No. 7
  - Reeve: Steven Berg
  - Administrator: Erica Pederson
- Time zone: CST
- Postal code: S0C 1Z0
- Area code: 306
- Highways: Highway 35; Highway 18
- Railways: Long Creek Railroad Company Inc

Bromhead is an unincorporated community and ghost town in Souris Valley Rural Municipality No. 7, Saskatchewan, Canada. The community is approximately 5 km (3.1 mi) north of Highway 18 and 45 km (28 mi) west of the City of Estevan.

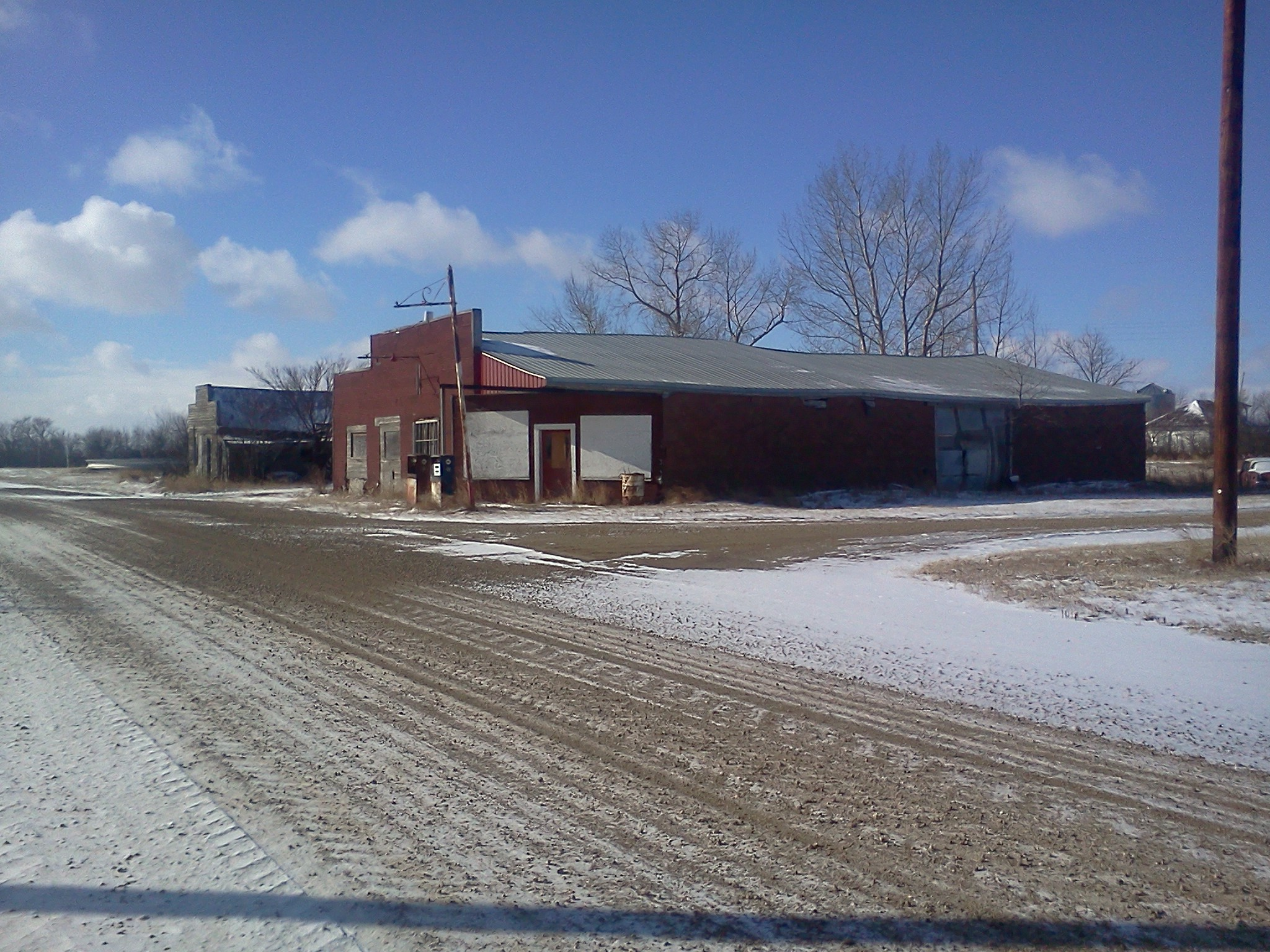
"Downtown" Bromhead, 2014

When Bromhead was first established in 1913, it was a thriving community and one of the biggest stops along the railway. It featured a three-storey hotel, dance hall, blacksmith shop, tailor, department store, cafe, and photo gallery. A fire swept through town in 1916 and it never fully recovered as many residents didn't have insurance or chose to relocate elsewhere. The town, though, didn't completely die then as some of the town did rebuild.

As of 2018, 14 people lived in Bromhead. The local church, Hamar Lutheran, is still open; the post office is still in use; the railway through town, Long Creek Railroad Inc, was bought by locals and put back into service; and the grain elevator is still in use. Most of the buildings, such as the schoolhouse, gas station, houses, and stores are abandoned.

== See also ==
- List of communities in Saskatchewan
- List of ghost towns in Saskatchewan
