= Long Creek Academy =

- U.S. National Register of Historic Places
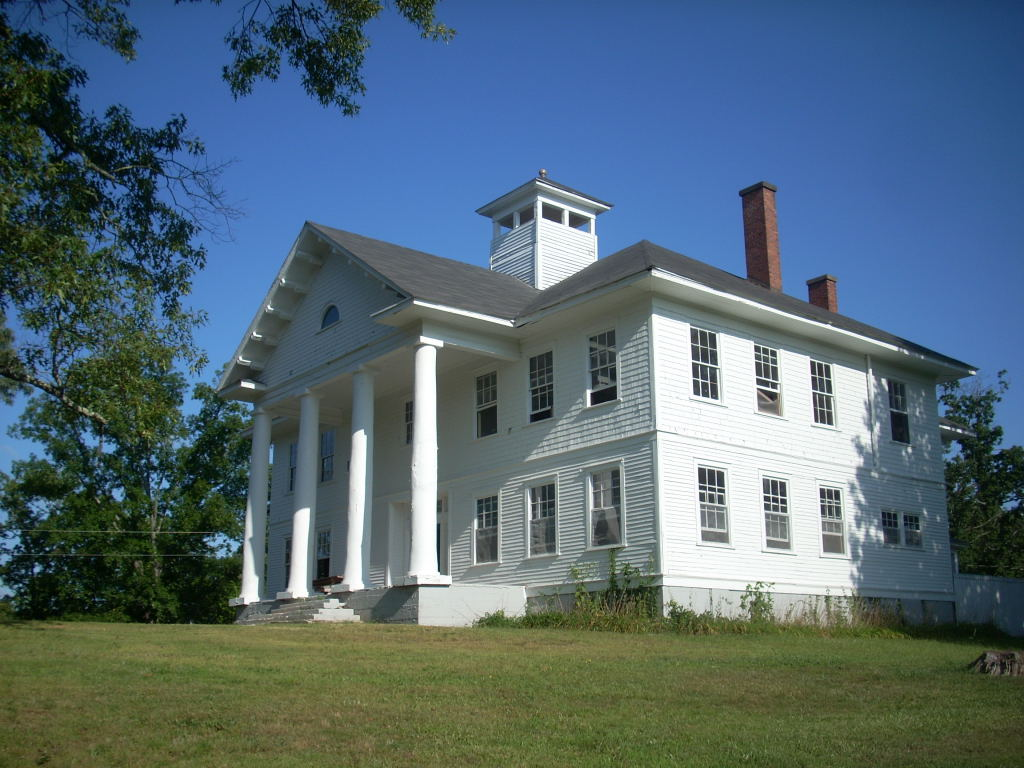
- Long Creek Academy in 2009

- Location within South Carolina Location within the United States
- Nearest city: Long Creek, South Carolina
- Coordinates: 34°47′25″N 83°14′52″W
- Area: 19.9 acres (8.1 ha)
- Built: 1914
- NRHP reference No.: 87002059
- Added to NRHP: November 20, 1987

The Long Creek Academy is a former Christian school that is located at the intersection of Academy Road and South Carolina S-37-339 near U.S. Route 76 near Long Creek, South Carolina in Oconee County. It was named to the National Register of Historic Places on November 20, 1987. It is currently used by a whitewater rafting company.

== History ==
In 1913, the Beaverdam Baptist Association began planning for a high school for rural children in Oconee County. The school began in 1914 under the Beaverdam Baptist Association and the Home Mission Board of the Southern Baptist Convention. It was one of six "mountain mission schools" in the South including four others in South Carolina.

The Academy had 55 acres (22 ha). The Main Building was completed in 1914, and the Sullivan Building was completed in 1917.

In 1916, the Saluda Baptist Association agreed to cooperate with the Beaverdam Baptist Association for the equipment of the academy. In 1922, the General Board of the South Carolina Baptist Convention took over operation of the school. In 1931, the South Carolina Baptist Convention sold the property.

The principal of the Academy, Rev. Luther Henry Raines, reorganized the school as a private corporation. It became an accredited state high school. Although Bible courses were still taught, the State of South Carolina assisted in paying the teachers until 1952. Raines operated the Academy without state or denominational aid until 1956.

The property was divided and sold. In 1976, James and Jeanette Greiner bought 19 acres (8 ha) including the two buildings of the Academy. They converted it into the local headquarters for a river rafting outfitter for the nearby Chattooga River.

== Architecture ==
=== Main Building ===
The Main building is an L-shaped, wood frame, two-story building with an attic. It has a river rock and concrete foundation covered with stucco that was scored to resemble cut stone. The building has weatherboard siding on the first story and wood shingles on the second story. The building originally had a metal hip roof that is now covered in composition shingles. The roof has a square cupola with pyramidal roof and four brick chimneys. The windows are six over six light, double-hung sash windows.

The front elevation has seven bays. There is a gable-roofed portico, supported by four brick columns covered in stucco, that extends across three bays of the front elevation. There is a semi-circular fanlight on the gable end of its roof. The main door has nine lights with a transom.

The interior has a central corridor with stairs leading to a second-story landing. A second set of stairs leads to the second floor. The interior has heart pine floors, tongue and groove ceilings, and plaster walls. The first floor had a kitchen, office, four classrooms, and a rest room. The second floor has four classrooms and four dormitory rooms.

As shown in old photographs, the building was originally painted a dark color with white trim. Now, it is painted white. Additional pictures are available.

=== Sullivan Building ===
The Sullivan Building, which was named for Paul P. Sullivan of Westminster, was built in 1917 about 150 yd (137 m) to the northwest of the Main Building. The Sullivan Building is an L-shaped, two-story wood frame building with a hip roof. Its west wing built in at a later time. The building has unpainted weatherboarding. There are eight chimneys. The original part of the building has six over six light sash windows. The addition's original windows have been replaced by either shutters or one over one windows.

This building originally had fifteen dormitory rooms. Its interior has been modified for its current business. There is also a non-contributing shed between the two buildings.
