= Rural Municipality of Souris Valley No. 7 =

Rural municipality in Saskatchewan, Canada

Souris Valley No. 7
- Rural municipality
- Rural Municipality of Souris Valley No. 7
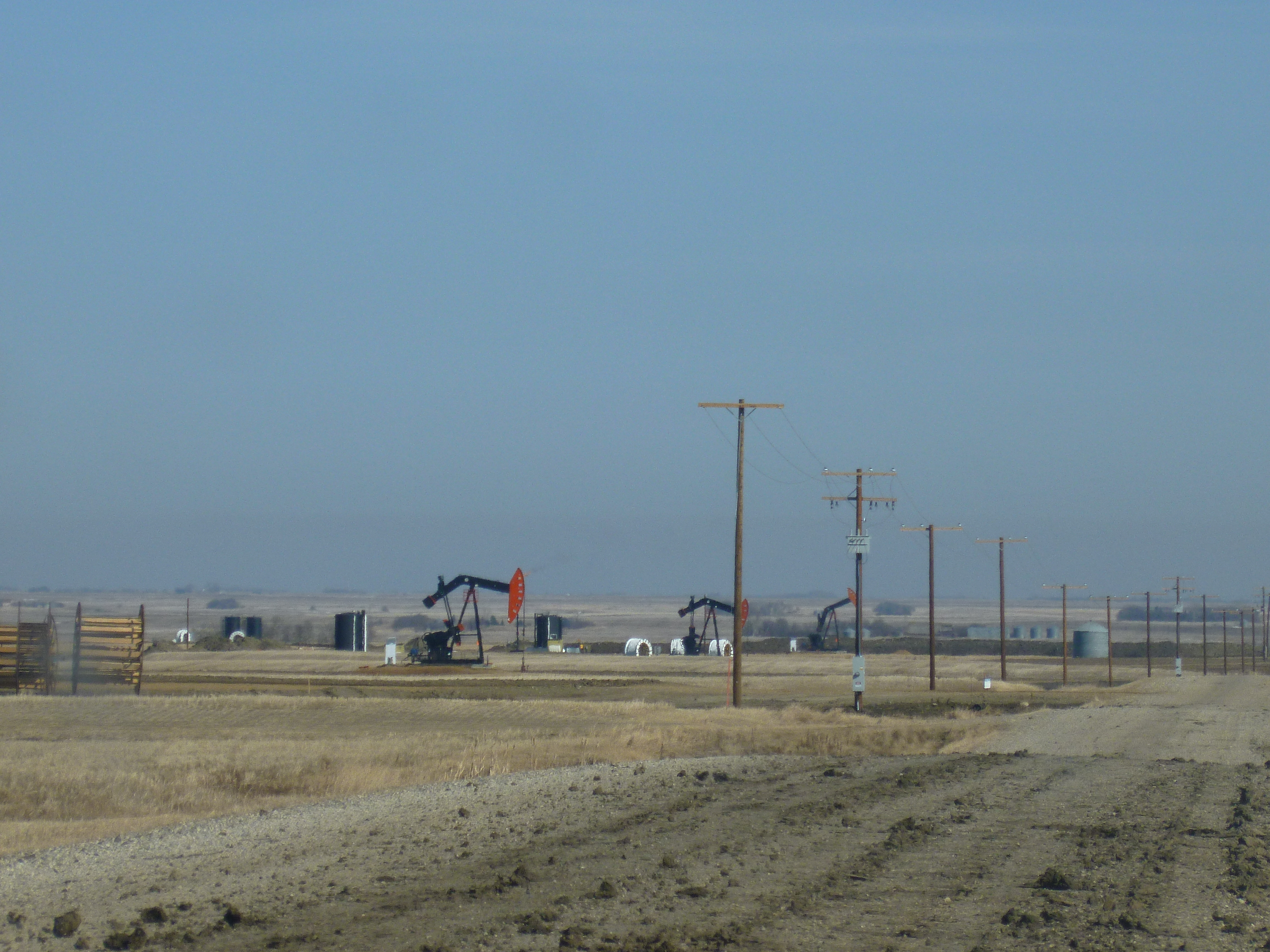
- Oil field in the RM of Souris Valley

- Location of the RM of Souris Valley No. 7 in Saskatchewan
- Coordinates: 49.136°N 103.839°W
- Country: Canada
- Province: Saskatchewan
- Census division: 2
- SARM division: 1
- Federal riding: Souris—Moose Mountain
- Provincial riding: Estevan
- Formed: December 13, 1909

Government
  - Reeve: Robert Forrester
  - Governing body: RM of Souris Valley No. 7 Council
  - Administrator: Erica Pederson
  - Office location: Oungre

Area (2016)
  - Land: 817.52 km^{2} (315.65 sq mi)

Population (2016)
  - Total: 249
  - Density: 0.3/km^{2} (0.78/sq mi)
- Time zone: CST
  - Summer (DST): CST
- Postal code: S0C 1Z0
- Area codes: 306 and 639
- Website: Official website

The Rural Municipality of Souris Valley No. 7 (2016 population: 249) is a rural municipality (RM) in the Canadian province of Saskatchewan within Census Division No. 2 and SARM Division No. 1. Located in the southeast portion of the province, it is adjacent to the United States border, neighbouring Divide County in North Dakota.

== History ==
The RM of Souris Valley No. 7 incorporated as a rural municipality on December 13, 1909.

== Geography ==
=== Communities and localities ===
The following unincorporated communities are within the RM.

Localities

- Bromhead
- Hoffer
- Oungre
- Ratcliffe
- Tribune

== Oungre Memorial Regional Park ==
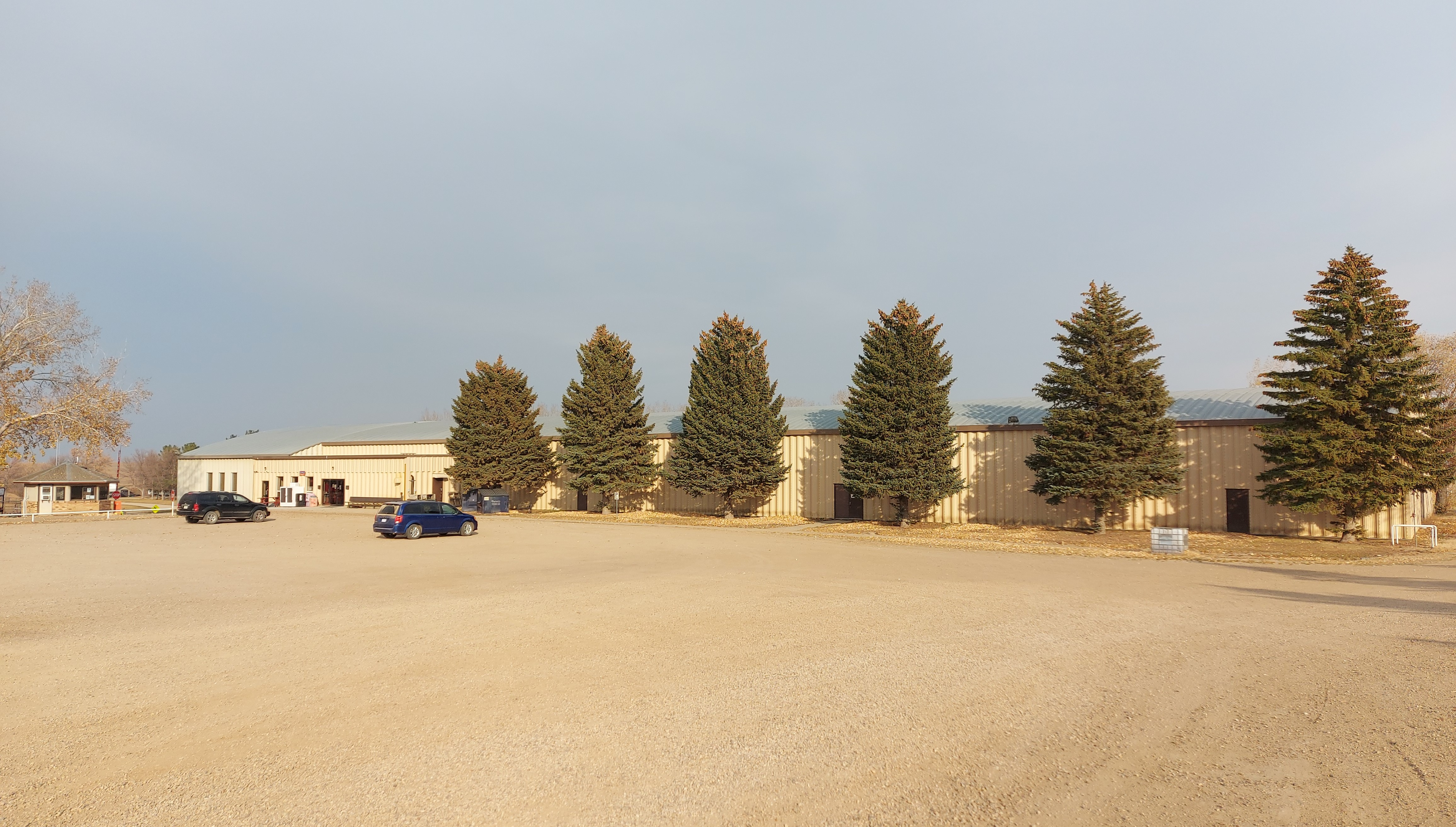
Souris Valley Communiplex at Oungre Park

Oungre Park (49.1644°N 103.8088°W) is a regional park in the RM that was founded in 1963 and has a campground, golf course, ball diamonds, disk golf, and a community centre. The park is located on the southern bank of Long Creek.

The original homesteader on the land, Frank Foster, had planted a grove of trees at the site in 1908. Even though the Fosters had left the area in 1926 after Frank's death, the site had become known as Foster's Grove and had become the location of annual sports days and picnics. In 1942, Foster's Grove was purchased by the RM. A bandstand was constructed in 1946 and a cenotaph was erected in 1947. In 1963, the park became Oungre Memorial Regional Park and further developments followed, such as the golf course in 1967, a swimming pool in 1969, the Souris Valley Communiplex in 1984, and an 18-hole mini golf course in 1985.

The Communiplex has an indoor swimming pool, arena, and restaurant. The golf course is a 9-hole, sand green course totalling 2,900 yards. The campground have 29 full service sites as well as electric and tenting sites. There are modern washrooms, laundry facilities, showers, and potable water.

== Demographics ==
Population history (1981–2016)
Year	Pop.	±%
1981	546	—
1986	525	−3.8%
1991	444	−15.4%
1996	422	−5.0%
2001	326	−22.7%
2006	230	−29.4%
2011	240	+4.3%
2016	249	+3.8%
Source: Statistics Canada via Saskatchewan Bureau of Statistics

In the 2021 Census of Population conducted by Statistics Canada, the RM of Souris Valley No. 7 had a population of 220 living in 94 of its 110 total private dwellings, a change of −11.6% from its 2016 population of 249. With a land area of 804.48 km^{2} (310.61 sq mi), it had a population density of 0.3/km^{2} (0.7/sq mi) in 2021.

In the 2016 Census of Population, the RM of Souris Valley No. 7 recorded a population of 249 living in 99 of its 128 total private dwellings, a 3.8% change from its 2011 population of 240. With a land area of 817.52 km^{2} (315.65 sq mi), it had a population density of 0.3/km^{2} (0.8/sq mi) in 2016.

== Government ==
The RM of Souris Valley No. 7 is governed by an elected municipal council and an appointed administrator that meets on the second Tuesday of every month. The reeve of the RM is Robert Forrester while its administrator is Erica Pederson. The RM's office is located in Oungre.

== See also ==
- List of rural municipalities in Saskatchewan
