= Long Creek Bridge =

- Coordinates: 49.01416°N 103.06448°W
- Carries: Roadway
- Crosses: Long Creek
- Locale: Estevan No. 5, Saskatchewan, Canada
- Official name: Long Creek Bridge

Characteristics
- Material: Reinforced concrete

Location
- Interactive map of Long Creek Bridge

Long Creek Bridge is a bridge that spans across Long Creek. It is 2 kilometres (1.2 mi) from the Canada–United States border and 15 kilometres (9.3 mi) from Estevan, Saskatchewan, Canada. The bridge was originally a wooden bridge that had reached the end of its useful life, and in 2009 work started on a new precast, pre-stressed concrete bridge as part of the federal government's National Action Plan.

The new bridge includes three 12.0-metre spans, a 7.32-metre-wide (24.0 ft) bridge deck and 12.0-meter precast, pre-stressed, concrete stringers. The cost of constructing a new bridge was budgeted at CA$850,000 in 2011.

== See also ==
- List of bridges in Canada
