= Oungre =

Hamlet in Saskatchewan, Canada

Coordinates: 49°08′44″N 103°48′06″W

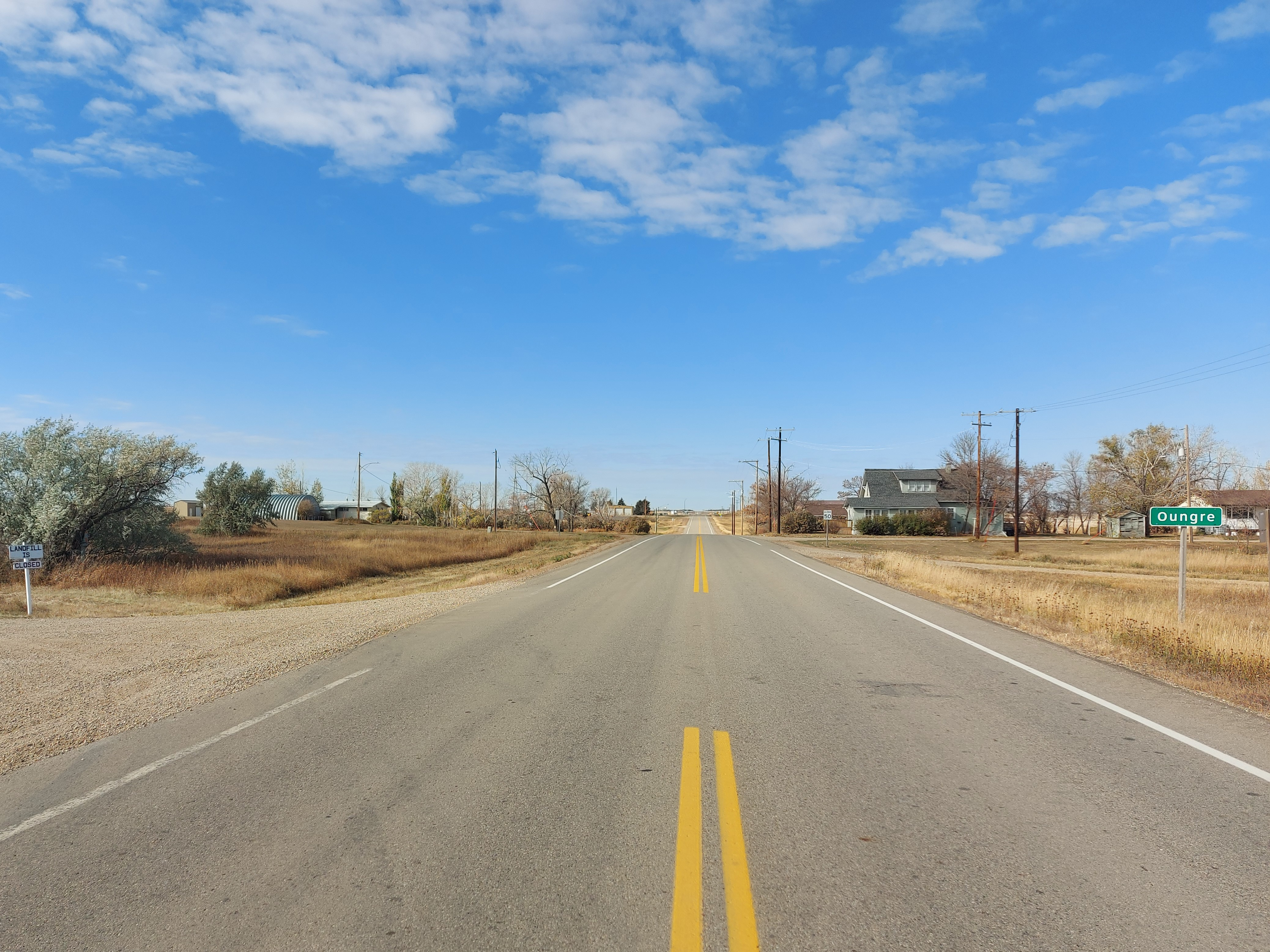
Highway 18 passing through Oungre

Oungre is a hamlet in the Canadian province of Saskatchewan. It is at the junction of Highway 18 and Highway 35 in the RM of Souris Valley No. 7.

== Demographics ==
In the 2021 Census of Population conducted by Statistics Canada, Oungre had a population of 10 living in 9 of its 11 total private dwellings, a change of -50% from its 2016 population of 20. With a land area of 0.16 km^{2} (0.062 sq mi), it had a population density of 62.5/km^{2} (161.9/sq mi) in 2021.

== See also ==
- List of communities in Saskatchewan
- List of hamlets in Saskatchewan
- Oungre Memorial Regional Park
- Block settlement§Jewish
