= List of state highways in North Dakota =

- North Dakota highway markers

- Map of North Dakota highway system

Highway names
- Interstates: Interstate X (I-X)
- US Highways: U.S. Route X (US X)
- State: N.D. Highway X (ND X)

System links
- North Dakota State Highway System; Interstate; US; State

The state highways in North Dakota are the state highways owned and maintained by the North Dakota Department of Transportation (NDDOT). North Dakota is a state located in the Midwestern region of the United States, along the Canadian border. The state is bordered by Manitoba and Saskatchewan to the north, Minnesota to the east, South Dakota to the south, and Montana to the west.

== Signage ==
Comparison of the previous and new versions of the North Dakota highway route maker

Until 2016 North Dakota highway signage had an "N" and a "D" in the top corners and a Native American profile, based on Lakota policeman Marcellus Red Tomahawk; since 2016 the marker has had "North Dakota" on a black background, the state in outline, and the highway number within the state outline. This transition to new signs is a slow process that will take years before the old signs are completely out of commission. The state will be replacing the old signs as needed, so both versions can currently be seen while driving on North Dakota roads.

According to NDDOT, this change was made for a number of reasons. These include the department's centennial celebration, to demonstrate the significant spending to improve North Dakota roads in the past few years, and to keep uniformity across the United States, especially with online mapping providers which render individual state shields. According to an NDDOT representative, "a number of different states use their state outline or symbol on the highway signs." Some also cited the North Dakota Fighting Sioux controversy as part of the reason why the state decided to change the shields, to avoid any further offense.

== Mainline highways ==
Number	Length (mi)	Length (km)	Southern or western terminus	Northern or eastern terminus	Formed	Removed	Notes
ND 1	—	—	South Dakota state line	Canadian border	1924	c. 1927	became part of US 81
ND 1	230.443	370.862	SD-37 near Ludden	PTH 31 in Maida	1927	current	
ND 2	—	—	South Dakota state line	US 85 at Alexander	1924	c. 1927	middle section became part of US 85 and northern section renumbered ND 42 by 1927; remaining section renumbered ND 16 because of US 2
ND 3	—	—	Montana state line	Minnesota state line	1926	c. 1927	became part of US 10
ND 3	247.530	398.361	SD 45	US 281 / PTH 10 north of Dunseith	1927	current	
ND 4	—	—	ND 5 at Rock Lake	Canadian border	1926	c. 1939	section from Rock Lake to the South Dakota state line until that section was transferred to US 281 in 1932; remainder transferred to US 281 by 1940
ND 4	10.283	16.549	US 281 / ND 5 in Armourdale	PTH 5 at the Canadian border	1997	current	
ND 5	335.813	540.439	MT 5 near Fortuna	MN 175 near Joliette	1926	current	
ND 6	67.413	108.491	SD 63 near Maple Leaf, S.D.	I-94 Bus. in Mandan	1926	current	
ND 7	—	—	MT 200 near Fairview, Mont.	MN 200 near Halstad, Minn.	1926	1970	Replaced by ND 200 in 1970
ND 8	—	—	Montana state line	Minnesota state line	1926	c. 1927	became part of US 2
ND 8	211.321	340.088	SD 75 near Hettinger	Hwy 9 in Northgate	1927	current	
ND 9	53.597	86.256	US 52 / US 281 in Melville	ND 1 in Rogers	1926	current	
ND 10	—	—	South Dakota state line	Canadian border	1926	c. 1927	renumbered as ND 3 because of US 10
ND 10	14.552	23.419	US 52 / I-94 southwest of Casselton	US 10 near West Fargo	—	—	Unsigned
ND 11	182.459	293.639	US 83 west of Hague	MN 55 near Fairmount	1926	current	
ND 12	—	—	ND 5 at Langdon	ND 11 at Oakes	1926	c. 1927	renumbered as ND 1 because of US 12
ND 13	205.533	330.773	ND 1804 near Linton	ND 210 in Wahpeton	1926	current	Originally ended at US 83 at Linton. The westward extension opened in 1980.
ND 14	175.003	281.640	I-94 in Sterling	PTH 21 north of Carbury	1926	current	
ND 15	134.137	215.873	US 52 in Fessenden	I-29 / US 81 near Thompson	1926	current	
ND 16	—	—	Montana state line	South Dakota state line	1926	c. 1927	became part of US 12
ND 16	77.915	125.392	ND 68 north of Trotters	Golva	1927	current	
ND 17	140.372	225.907	ND 3 near Barton	MN 317 at the Minnesota state line	1926	current	
ND 18	242.147	389.698	SD 25 south of Lidgerwood	PTH 30 north of Neche	1926	current	
ND 19	68.988	111.025	CR 19 / CR 11 at the McHenry–Pierce county line	ND 20 in Devils Lake	1926	current	
ND 20	170.550	274.474	US 52 / US 281 in Jamestown	PTH 34 near Sarles	1926	current	
ND 21	122.384	196.958	US 85 in Slope County	ND 6 north of Breien	1926	current	
ND 22	156.051	251.140	SD 79 near Reeder	ND 23 near New Town	1926	current	
ND 23	122.028	196.385	US 85 / ND 200 in Watford City	ND 41 near Velva	1926	current	
ND 24	—	—	Canadian border	South Dakota state line near Petrel	1926	c. 1927	renumbered ND 8
ND 24	45.046	72.495	ND 6 east of Selfridge	ND 6 in Breien	1927	current	former ND 42 west of Fort Yates; rest former route of ND 6 north of Fort Yates
ND 25	34.758	55.938	I-94 / I-94 Bus west of Mandan	ND 31 in Hannover	1926	current	
ND 26	—	—	—	—	1926	c. 1927	became part of US 85
ND 26	21.464	34.543	ND 1 in Dazey	ND 32 near Pillsbury	1927	current	
ND 27	44.973	72.377	ND 1 north of Verona	ND 18 north of Wyndmere	1926	current	
ND 28	67.002	107.829	ND 37 near Roseglen US 2 at Berthold	ND 23 north of Ryder Hwy 8 near Sherwood	1926	current	
ND 29	150	240	ND 60 west of Overly	MN 11 at Drayton	1926	1963	Replaced by ND 66 in 1963, to avoid confusion with nearby I-29
ND 30	131.427	211.511	ND 13 in Lehr US 52 / ND 200 near Sykeston ND 66 near Mylo	I-94 near Medina US 2 near York PTH 18 near St. John	1926	current	
ND 31	69.195	111.359	SD 65 near McIntosh, S.D. I-94 north of New Salem	ND 21 near Flasher Stanton	1926	current	
ND 32	236.674	380.890	SD 27 near Havana	PTH 32 north of Walhalla	1926	current	
ND 33	150	240	Gilby	US 81 at Manvel	1926	c. 1965	Replaced by Grand Forks CR 33
ND 34	—	—	US 281 west of Fort Totten	US 2 in Devil's Lake	1926	c. 1927	renumbered ND 57
ND 34	56.932	91.623	US 83 at Hazelton	ND 56 south of Gackle	1927	current	previously part of ND 13
ND 35	—	—	US 83 at Linton	ND 13 at Fredonia	1926	c. 1927	transferred to rerouted ND 13
ND 35	27.264	43.877	US 2 at Michigan	ND 17 near Adams	1927	current	
ND 36	90.344	145.395	US 83 at Wilton	US 52 / US 281 near Pingree	1926	current	
ND 37	—	—	ND 6 in St. Anthony	South Dakota state line	1926	c. 1927	transferred to rerouted ND 6
ND 37	61.920	99.651	ND 23 west of Parshall	US 83 east of Garrison	1927	current	previously part of ND 7
ND 38	36.332	58.471	I-94 / US 52 south of Buffalo	ND 32 at Hope	1926	current	
ND 39	—	—	Mikkelson	US 10 in Medora	1926	c. 1937	Sections from US 85 south of Watford City to Mikkelson and Medora to US 12 in Rhame removed by 1931; rest removed by 1937
ND 39	16.3	26.2	Canadian border north of Antler	US 83 east of Mohall	1937	c. 1973	Replaced by ND 256 by 1975
ND 40	63.450	102.113	US 2 near Tioga	Hwy 47 north of Noonan	1926	current	
ND 41	86.222	138.761	US 83 at Wilton	US 2 north of Norwich	1926	current	
ND 42	—	—	ND 37 in Selfridge, North Dakota	ND 6 south of Fort Yates, Fort Yates	1926	c. 1927	transferred to ND 24
ND 42	37.441	60.255	ND 50 near Corinth	Hwy 350 north of Ambrose	1927	current	formerly part of ND 2, which was truncated because portions were transferred to US 85
ND 43	—	—	Center	Mandan	1926	c. 1937	transferred to extension of ND 25; section from Center to Hazen removed from system by 1927
ND 43	23.304	37.504	ND 14 north of Carbury	US 281 / ND 3 near the International Peace Garden	1937	current	
ND 44	3.449	5.551	ND 66 at Drayton	I-29 south of Drayton	1926	current	Unpaved until 1950s
ND 45	18.048	29.045	ND 200 at Cooperstown	ND 32 west of Sharon	c. 1927	current	
ND 46	120.823	194.446	ND 30 near Streeter	I-29 near Oxbow	c. 1927	current	
ND 47	16.3	26.2	Burnstad	ND 30 east of Burnstad	1927	1955	
ND 48	—	—	ND 23 in Keene	US 85 north of Alexander	1927	1937	West end truncated to Banks by 1931; now CR 10, ND 1806, CR 35, CR 18, and CR 39
ND 48	12.167	19.581	ND 25 near Center ND 200 east of Riverdale	ND ALT 200 west of Fort Clark US 83 at Coleharbor	c. 1975	current	Segment 2 follows the Lewis and Clark Trail
ND 49	104.407	168.027	SD 73 at Thunder Hawk, S.D.	ND 200 near Beulah	c. 1927	current	
ND 50	100.245	161.329	MT 258 west of Grenora	US 52 near Coulee	c. 1927	current	
ND 51	—	—	US 85/ ND 23 in Watford City	ND 48 in Banks	1927	1937	Now part of ND 1806
ND 52	—	—	Ypsilanti	ND 13 west of LaMoure	1927	c. 1934	former portion of ND 20; renumbered ND 63 because of US 52
ND 53	—	—	ND 9 south of Leal	ND 46 in Marion	1927	c. 1931	removed from system
ND 53	45.037	72.480	US 83 at Max	US 52 near Balfour	1935	current	created when ND 23 was realigned on a new road to the south
ND 54	2.263	3.642	I-29 west of Oslo, Minn.	MN 1 at Oslo, Minn.	1927	current	
ND 55	30	48	Walhalla	US 81 at Pembina	c. 1927	1950	Replaced by Pembina CR 55
ND 56	50.203	80.794	ND 11 east of Ashley	ND 46 at Gackle	c. 1927	current	
ND 57	13.277	21.367	US 281 west of Fort Totten	ND 20 near Camp Grafton	c. 1927	current	formerly ND 34
ND 58	9.800	15.772	ND 200 near Fairview, Mont.	ND 1804 near Buford	c. 1931	current	
ND 59	—	—	ND 15 in Fessenden, North Dakota	ND 7 west of Heaton, North Dakota	1931	c. 1934	became part of US 52
ND 59	1.063	1.711	I-29 in Pembina	MN 171 at the Minnesota state line east of Pembina	c. 1953	current	
ND 60	29.878	48.084	ND 3 / ND 17 east of Barton	ND 5 east of Bottineau	c. 1931	current	Formerly part of ND 17
ND 61	—	—	MT 23 east of Sidney, Mont.	ND 16	c. 1931	c. 1963	Formerly part of ND 23; Became part of ND 68
ND 62	19	31	US 10 / US 52 at Spiritwood	ND 9 west of Wimbledon	c. 1937	c. 1963	Formerly part of ND 20; replaced by Stutsman CR 62
ND 63	50	80	Ypsilanti	ND 13 west of LaMoure	c. 1934	1950	Replaced by Stutsman / LaMoure CR 63
ND 64	—	—	—	—	c. 1937	—	
ND 65	9.383	15.100	ND 45 north of Cooperstown	ND 1 at Binford	c. 1937	current	
ND 66	138.720	223.248	ND 3 south of Dunseith	MN 11 at Drayton	c. 1963	current	
ND 67	27.466	44.202	US 12 at Scranton	ND 21 west of New England	—	—	
ND 68	28.124	45.261	MT 23 near Sidney, Mont.	US 85 south of Alexander	—	—	
ND 69	10	16	US 281 / ND 5 east of Rolla	Canadian north of Hansboro	c. 1969	1997	Replaced by ND 4 due to sign thefts.
ND 73	11.332	18.237	ND 23 east of Watford City	ND 22 north of Mandaree	c. 1975	current	
ND 89	1.960	3.154	Lignite	ND 5 north of Lignite	—	—	
ND 91	1.262	2.031	US 81 at St. Thomas	US 81 at St. Thomas	—	—	In Pembina County
ND 91	0.523	0.842	US 52 at Harvey	ND 3 at Harvey	—	—	In Wells County
ND 97	2.539	4.086	ND 41 south of Velva	US 52 southeast of Velva	—	—	
ND 127	22.695	36.524	SD 127 south of Fairmount	ND 13 at Wahpeton	c. 1979	current	
ND 200	415.778	669.130	MT 200 near Fairview, Mont.	MN 200 near Halstad, Minn.	1970	current	Part of a chain of state highways numbered 200 that stretches from Minnesota to Idaho
ND 210	2.937	4.727	ND 13 at Wahpeton	MN 210 at Breckenridge, Minn.	—	—	
ND 256	16.406	26.403	US 83 / ND 5 at Renville	PR 256 at the Canadian border	c. 1970	current	
ND 294	2.158	3.473	Hector International Airport	I-29 in Fargo	—	—	
ND 297	3.060	4.925	I-29 in Grand Forks	US 2 Bus. in East Grand Forks, Minn.	—	—	
ND 810	5.741	9.239	I-194 in Mandan	I-94 Bus. in Bismarck	—	—	Part of the Bismarck Expressway
ND 1804	342.805	551.691	SD 1804 near Pollock, S.D.	S-327 at Fort Union Trading Post	—	—	Part of the Lewis and Clark Trail; designated to reflect the years of the expedition
ND 1806	130.750	210.422	ND 24 near Cannon Ball ND 200 at Lake Sakakawea State Park ND 23 south of Charlson CR 2 near Tobacco Garden Bay	Oliver–Morton county line north of Mandan ND 8 south of Twin Buttes CR 2 near Charlson ND 23 at Watford City	—	—	Part of the Lewis and Clark Trail; designated to reflect the years of the expedition
Former

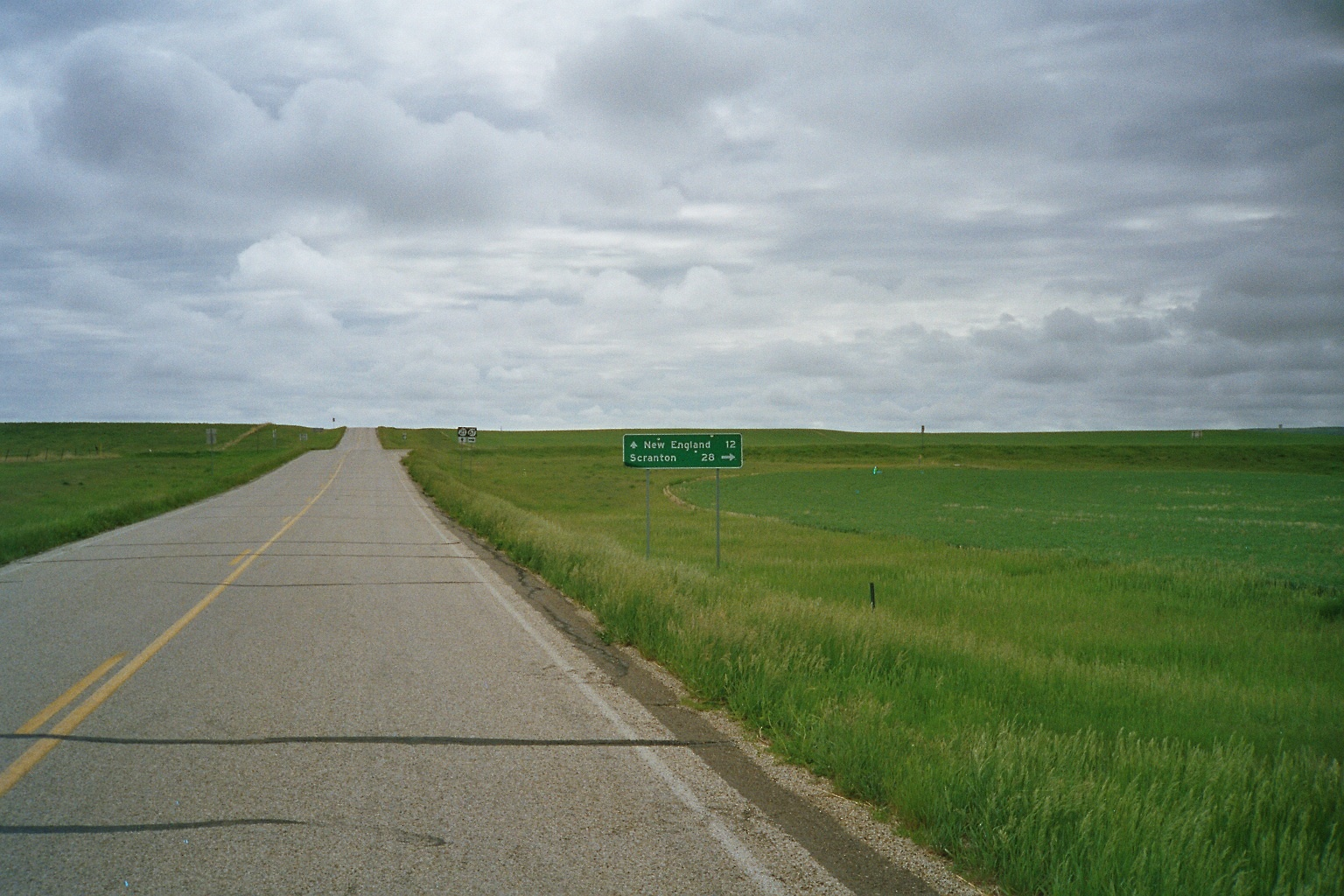
Highway 21 in Slope County

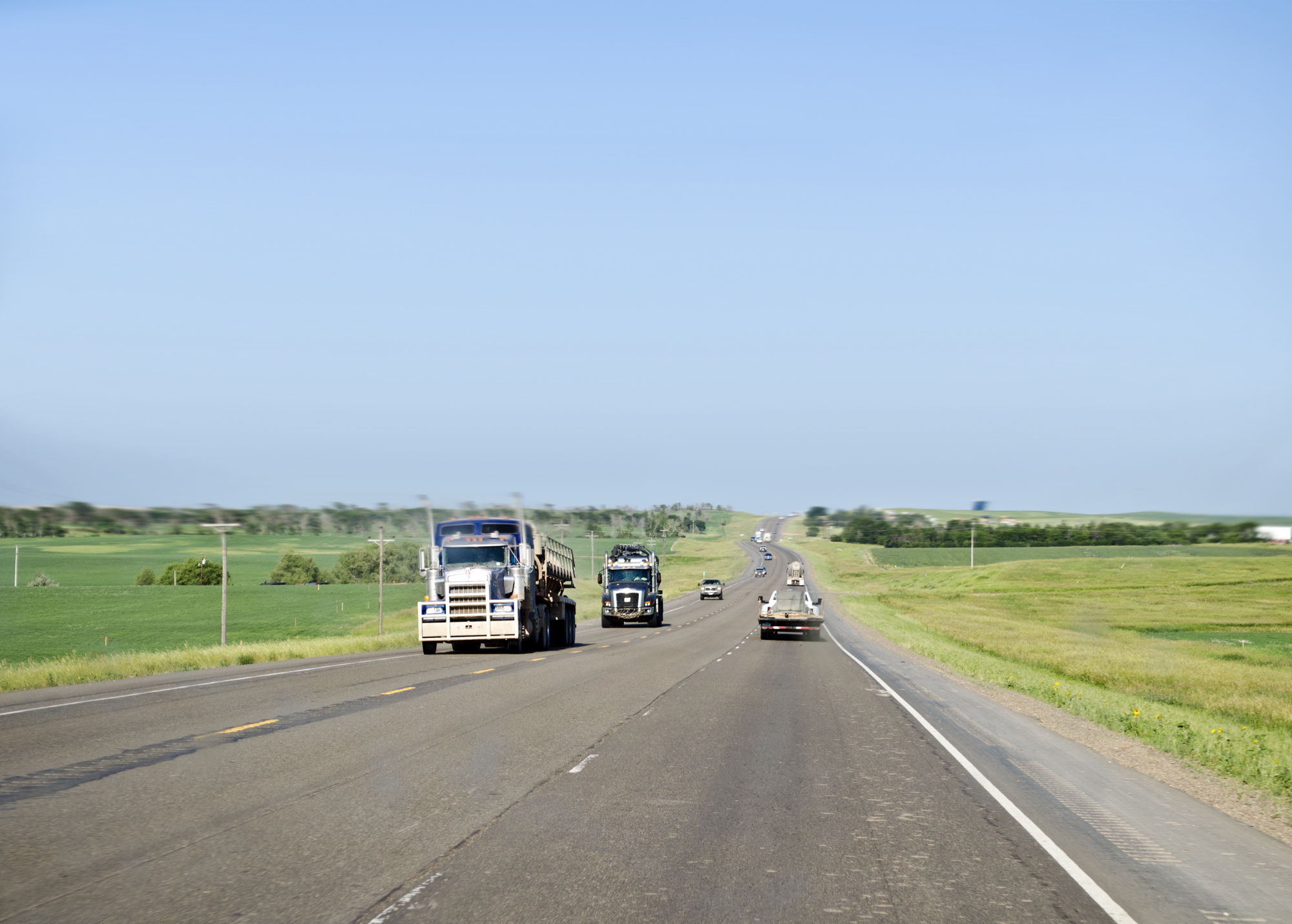
Highway 200/US 85 west of Watford City

== Special routes ==
Number	Length (mi)	Length (km)	Southern or western terminus	Northern or eastern terminus	Formed	Removed	Notes
ND 22 Bus.	5.052	8.130	ND 22 / ND 200 in Killdeer	ND 22 near Killdeer	—	—	
ND 22	7.751	12.474	Interstate 94 near Dickinson	ND 22 near Dickinson	—	—	
ND 23A	1.526	2.456	US 85 Bus. in Watford City	ND 23B in Watford City	—	—	
ND 23 Bus.	5.767	9.281	US 85 Bus. / ND 23 in Watford City	ND 23 in Watford City	—	—	In McKenzie County
ND 23B Truck	3.183	5.123	ND 1804 near New Town	ND 23 near New Town	—	—	In Mountrail County
ND 200A	36.383	58.553	ND 200 near Hazen	ND 200 near Underwood	—	—	
ND 200A	8.353	13.443	ND 18 near Hillsboro	ND 200 near Hillsboro	—	—	In Traill County
Former

== See also ==
- Burkle addressing system - The system used to assign road names to smaller, rural roads in North Dakota.
