= North Dakota Highway 17 =

State highway in North Dakota, US

North Dakota Highway 17
- ND 17 highlighted in red

Route information
- Maintained by NDDOT
- Length: 140.372 mi (225.907 km)
- Existed: 1939–present

Major junctions
- West end: ND 3 / ND 60 near Barton
- US 281 in Cando; ND 1 near Edmore; ND 32 near Adams; ND 18 near Park River; US 81 in Grafton; I-29 near Drayton
- East end: MN 317 at the Minnesota border near Oakwood

Location
- Country: United States
- State: North Dakota
- Counties: Pierce, Towner, Ramsey, Walsh

Highway system
- North Dakota State Highway System; Interstate; US; State
← ND 16	→ ND 18

North Dakota Highway 17 (ND 17) is a 140.372-mile-long (225.907 km) east–west highway stretching from just east of Barton to the Minnesota border at the Red River of the North. It is 139 miles in length and its alignment was established in 1939.

== Route description ==
North Dakota Highway 17 begins at an intersection with ND 3 and ND 60 east of Barton in Pierce County. It heads east for fifteen miles before entering the small community of Wolford. Ten miles farther east, the highway enters Towner County. Thirteen miles east of the county line, the route intersects US 281 and enters the city of Cando. Eleven miles east of Cando, the road enters Ramsey County. Four miles east, ND 17 begins a four-mile concurrency with ND 20. After heading south for two miles, the concurrency reaches Starkweather. Two miles farther south, the concurrency with ND 20 ends. ND 17 heads east for twenty miles and enters Edmore. Three miles east of Edmore, the highway intersects ND 1. Three more miles east, the route enters Walsh County. Nine miles east of the county line, ND 17 serves as the northern terminus of ND 35. Two miles east of this intersection, the route enters Adams. The route heads ten miles east and intersects ND 32. Five miles east, the road enters the city of Park River. After heading east for six miles, ND 17 heads north for a mile during a short concurrency with ND 18. About nine miles east of the concurrency, the route enters the city of Grafton. In central Grafton, ND 17 forms a very short concurrency with US 81 which remains inside the city limits. Ten miles east of Grafton, the highway shares an interchange with Interstate 29. The highway then heads east for a mile and a half more before crossing the Red River of the North and entering Marshall County, Minnesota. The highway is continued farther east as Minnesota State Highway 317.

== History ==
The first alignment of North Dakota Highway 17 was put into place in 1939, like many other state highways. The alignment passed through Grafton on 5th Street, taking a northern route through the city. In either the late 1950s or the early 1960s, state officials modified the route to take 12th Street through Grafton, a more southern route. Besides that, ND 17 has remained in its original alignment.

== Major intersections ==
County	Location	mi	km	Destinations	Notes
Pierce		0.000	0.000	ND 3 / ND 60 north – Dunseith, Rugby	Western terminus, southern terminus of ND 60
Towner	Cando	38.476	61.921	US 281 – Rolla, Church's Ferry	
Ramsey		53.440	86.003	ND 20 north – Munich	Northern end of ND 20 concurrency
Ramsey		58.439	94.048	ND 20 south – Devils Lake	Southern end of ND 20 concurrency
Ramsey		82.122	132.163	ND 1 – Langdon, Lakota	
Walsh		94.126	151.481	ND 35 south – Michigan	Northern terminus of ND 35
Walsh		106.314	171.096	ND 32 – Edinburg, Petersburg	
Walsh		117.243	188.684	ND 18 south – Larimore	Southern end of ND 18 concurrency
Walsh		118.119	190.094	ND 18 north – Cavalier	Northern end of ND 18 concurrency
Walsh	Grafton	127.738	205.574	US 81 north – St. Thomas	Western end of US 81 concurrency
Walsh	Grafton	127.896	205.829	US 81 south – Minto	Eastern end of US 81 concurrency
Walsh		137.911	221.946	I-29 – Grand Forks, Winnipeg	I-29 Exit 176
Marshall		140.372	225.907	MN 317 east – MN 220	Eastern terminus; Continuation into Minnesota
1.000 mi = 1.609 km; 1.000 km = 0.621 mi: Concurrency terminus
