= North Dakota Highway 19 =

State highway in North Dakota, US

North Dakota Highway 19
- ND 19 highlighted in red

Route information
- Maintained by NDDOT
- Length: 70.5 mi (113.5 km)
- Existed: 1939–present

Major junctions
- West end: CR 19 / CR 11 at the McHenry–Pierce county line
- ND 3 near Esmond; US 281 near Minnewaukan; US 2 in Devils Lake
- East end: ND 20 in Devils Lake

Location
- Country: United States
- State: North Dakota
- Counties: McHenry, Pierce, Benson, Ramsey

Highway system
- North Dakota State Highway System; Interstate; US; State
← ND 18	→ ND 20

North Dakota Highway 19 (ND 19) is an east–west route through central North Dakota. It runs from County Road 19 (CR 19) at the McHenry–Pierce county line to ND 20 in Devils Lake, a total of 70 miles (112.65 km). It has one concurrency with US Highway 281 (US 281) for four miles (6.4 km) near Minnewaukan.

== Route description ==
ND 19 begins at the McHenry–Pierce county line traveling east as a continuation of CR 19. The highway travels two miles (3.2 km) south of Battema Lake and two miles (3.2 km) north of Lesmeister Lake before intersecting with ND 3. After this intersection, the route heads northeast for two miles and forms the northern border of the Buffalo Lake National Wildlife Refuge, crossing Buffalo Lake in the process.

Three miles (4.8 km) after entering Benson County, ND 19 enters the small city of Esmond. After leaving Esmond, the route travels north for two miles. After turning east again for 11 miles (18 km), the highway intersects with ND 30. About 12 miles (19 km) east of this intersection, ND 19 reaches the city of Minnewaukan and begins a four-mile (6.4 km) concurrency with US 281. During this concurrency, the route travels northwest for three miles, then due north for the last mile (1.6 km). After this concurrency, the highway heads east once more and crosses Pelican Lake before crossing Oswalds Bay and entering Ramsey County.

In Ramsey County, the route travels east and crosses Sixmile Bay and Creel Bay. ND 19 serves as the major route between the city of Devils Lake and Devils Lake Regional Airport. The highway intersects US 2 in eastern Devils Lake. Less than a mile farther east, ND 19 meets its eastern terminus at a junction with ND 20.

== History ==
The majority of ND 19, the portion from its eastern terminus in Devils Lake to its junction with ND 3, was completed in 1939 and was the original alignment of the route. The small portion from ND 3 to its current western terminus at the McHenry–Pierce county line was completed between 1965 and 1975.

== Major intersections ==
County	Location	mi	km	Destinations	Notes
McHenry–Pierce county line		0.0	0.0	CR 19 west (42nd Street NE) / CR 11	Western terminus
Pierce		13.5	21.7	ND 3 – Rugby, Harvey	
Benson		34.8	56.0	ND 30 – York, Maddock	
Benson	Minnewaukan	47.0	75.6	US 281 south – New Rockford	Southern end of US 281 concurrency
Benson		50.3	81.0	US 281 north – Cando (62nd Ave NE)	Northern end of US 281 concurrency
Ramsey	Devils Lake	70.2	113.0	US 2 – Rugby, Grand Forks	
Ramsey	Devils Lake	70.5	113.5	ND 20 – Starkweather, Warwick	Eastern terminus
1.000 mi = 1.609 km; 1.000 km = 0.621 mi: Concurrency terminus
