= North Dakota Highway 35 =

State highway in North Dakota, U.S.

North Dakota Highway 35
- ND 35 highlighted in red

Route information
- Maintained by NDDOT
- Length: 27.264 mi (43.877 km)
- Existed: 1931–present

Major junctions
- South end: US 2 in Michigan City
- North end: ND 17 west of Adams

Location
- Country: United States
- State: North Dakota
- Counties: Nelson, Walsh

Highway system
- North Dakota State Highway System; Interstate; US; State
← ND 34	→ ND 36

North Dakota Highway 35 (ND 35) is a 27.264-mile-long (43.877 km) north–south state highway in the U.S. state of North Dakota. ND 35's southern terminus is at U.S. Route 2 (US 2) in Michigan City, and the northern terminus is at ND 17 west of Adams.

== Major intersections ==
County	Location	mi	km	Destinations	Notes
Nelson	Michigan City	0.000	0.000	US 2	Southern terminus
Walsh		27.264	43.877	ND 17	Northern terminus
1.000 mi = 1.609 km; 1.000 km = 0.621 mi
