= North Dakota Highway 20 =

State highway in North Dakota, US

North Dakota Highway 20
- ND 20 highlighted in red

Route information
- Maintained by NDDOT
- Length: 170.550 mi (274.474 km)
- Existed: 1939–present

Major junctions
- South end: US 52 / US 281 in Jamestown
- ND 200 in Glenfield; US 2 in Devils Lake; ND 5 in Clyde
- North end: PTH 34 at the Canadian border near Sarles

Location
- Country: United States
- State: North Dakota
- Counties: Stutsman, Foster, Eddy, Benson, Ramsey, Cavalier

Highway system
- North Dakota State Highway System; Interstate; US; State
← ND 19	→ ND 21

North Dakota Highway 20 (ND 20) is a 170.550-mile-long (274.474 km) north–south highway in North Dakota. It runs from U.S. Route 52 (US 52) and US 281 in Jamestown to the Canada–United States border near Sarles. The highway continues into Manitoba as PTH 34.

A portion of ND 20 between mile markers 87 and 90 was closed in April 2010 due to flooding at Devils Lake and Spring Lake.

== Route description ==
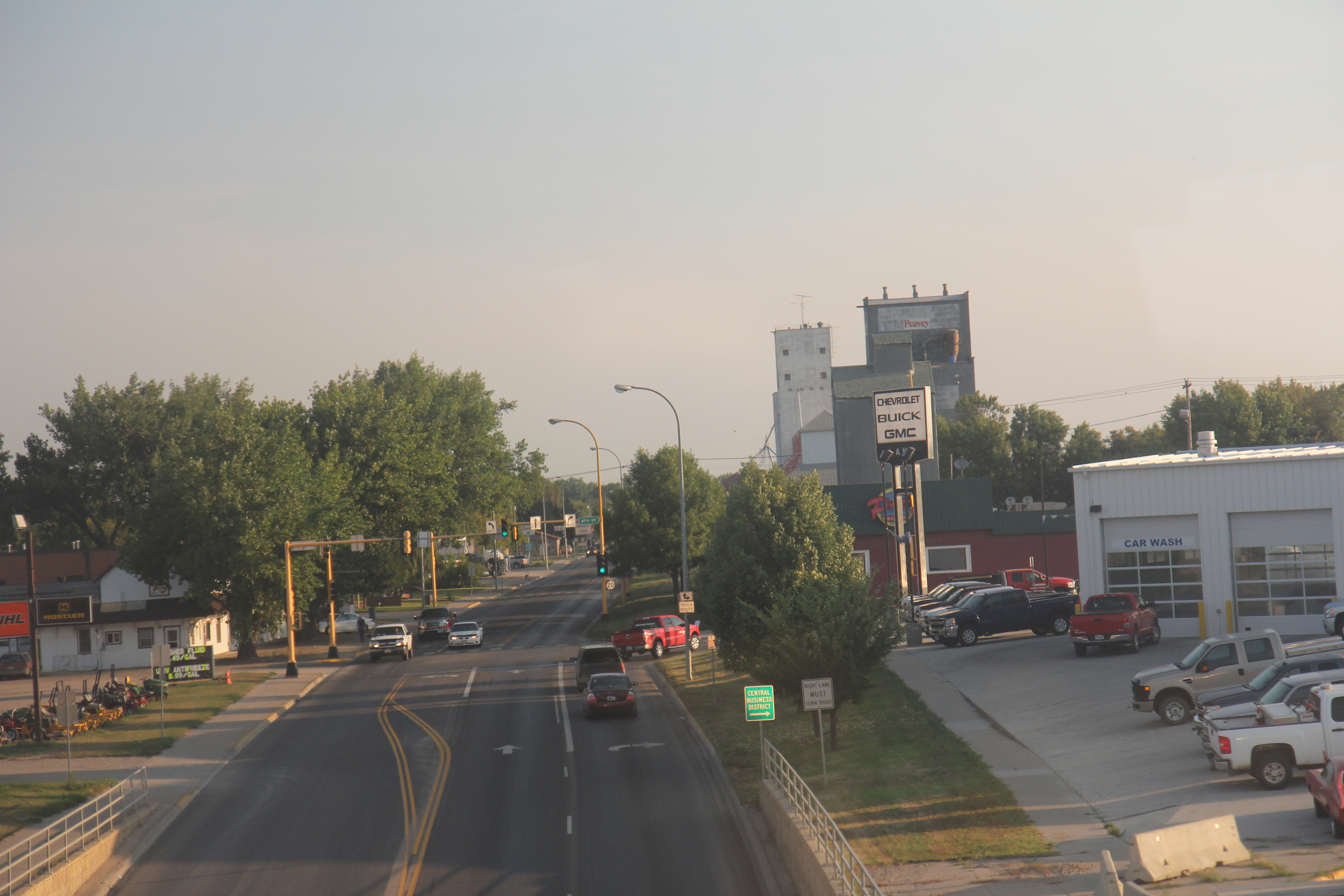
North Dakota 20 in Devils Lake, August 2013

Starting at US 52/US 281 in downtown Jamestown, ND 20 follows 4th Street NE until 5th Avenue NE, then curves onto 13th Street NE until 12th Avenue NE where ND 20 follows 12th Avenue out of Jamestown, past the Jamestown Regional Airport. It passes near Spiritwood Lake. 21.3 miles away from the intersection, ND 20 turns right onto ND 9 and continues for about six miles before turning off in Courtenay and running for 16.8 miles until intersecting with ND 200 in Glenfield. Another 16.3 miles north, ND 15 joins ND 20 for eight miles before turning off in Eddy County. ND 20 then continues northwest for 28.3 miles, passing by Warrick and Tokio before reaching the northern terminus of ND 57 and turning north again. The intersection is located on a causeway of Devils Lake. Continuing along the shores of Devils Lake, ND 20 shortly enters the city of Devils Lake and intersects US 2 and ND 19. 11.8 miles north of downtown Devils Lake, ND 20 passes through Webster, and then by Garske roughly five miles later. ND 17 joins ND 20 four miles later and passes west of Starkweather before ND 17 turns off to the west and ND 20 continues north. ND 20 comes across a brief concurrency with ND 66, and passes west of Munich before turning onto ND 5 for 5.8 miles. ND 20 spends its last 14.5 miles traversing rural areas, with the last important population center along the highway being in Calvin.

== Major intersections ==
County	Location	mi	km	Destinations	Notes
Stutsman	Jamestown	0.000	0.000	US 52 / US 281 (1st Avenue N)	Southern terminus
Stutsman		22.620	36.403	ND 9 west (13th Street SE) – Kensal	Western end of ND 9 concurrency
Stutsman	Courtenay	28.003	45.066	ND 9 east (1st Street)	Eastern end of ND 9 concurrency
Foster	Glenfield	44.903	72.264	ND 200 (3rd Street NE) – Carrington, Cooperstown	
Eddy		61.198	98.489	ND 15 east – New Rockford	Southern end of ND 15 concurrency
Eddy		69.313	111.548	ND 15 east (27th Street NE) – Pekin, McVille	Northern end of ND 15 concurrency
Benson	No major junctions				
Ramsey		97.709	157.247	ND 57 west – Fort Totten	Eastern terminus of ND 57
Ramsey	Devils Lake	102.654	165.206	US 2 – Rugby, Grand Forks	
Ramsey	Devils Lake	103.348	166.322	ND 19 west – Minnewaukan	Eastern terminus of ND 19
Ramsey		124.464	200.305	ND 17 east (69th Street NE) – Edmore, Park River	Southern end of ND 17 concurrency
Ramsey		129.463	208.351	ND 17 west (74th Street NE) – Cando	Northern end of ND 17 concurrency
Cavalier		141.255	227.328	ND 66 east (84th Street NE) – Alsen, Loma	Southern end of ND 66 concurrency
Cavalier				ND 66 west (84th Street NE) – Calio	Northern end of ND 66 concurrency
Cavalier		150.270	241.836	ND 5 east (93rd Street NE) – Langdon, Cavalier	Eastern end of ND 5 concurrency
Cavalier		156.034	251.112	ND 5 west (95th Street NE) – Rocklake, Rolla	Western end of ND 5 concurrency
Cavalier		170.550	274.474	PTH 34 north – Crystal City, Pilot Mound	Continuation into Manitoba
1.000 mi = 1.609 km; 1.000 km = 0.621 mi: Concurrency terminus

== See also ==
- List of state highways in North Dakota
- List of highways numbered 20
