= North Dakota Highway 43 =

State highway in North Dakota, U.S.

North Dakota Highway 43

Route information
- Maintained by NDDOT
- Length: 23.304 mi (37.504 km)

Major junctions
- West end: ND 14
- East end: US 281 / ND 3

Location
- Country: United States
- State: North Dakota
- Counties: Bottineau, Rolette

Highway system
- North Dakota State Highway System; Interstate; US; State
← ND 42	→ ND 44

North Dakota Highway 43 (ND 43) is a state highway located in extreme north-central North Dakota. It is about 23 miles (37 km) long and passes through Bottineau and Rolette counties.

== Route description ==
ND 43 runs in a virtually east–west direction its entire length. Its western terminus is at ND 14 about 3.3 miles (5.3 km) south of the Canadian border and about 3.7 miles (6.0 km) north of Carbury. Shortly after the route begins, ND 43 enters Turtle Mountain State Forest, where the highway curves slightly but eventually straightens out again. In Roland Township, ND 43 passes south of Lake Metigoshe and crosses Oak Creek. About 12 miles (19 km) east of ND 14, ND 43 again passes through a small section of Turtle Mountain State Forest. Three miles (4.8 km) east of the state forest, the highway enters Rolette County. ND 43 travels on a straight east–west course for six miles (9.7 km) in Rolette County before it comes to its eastern terminus at U.S. Highway 281 (US 281) and ND 3, which run concurrently. The terminus is about three miles (4.8 km) south of the Canadian border and the International Peace Garden, and about nine miles (14 km) north of Dunseith, North Dakota.

== Major intersections ==
County	Location	mi	km	Destinations	Notes
Bottineau	Dalen Township	0.000	0.000	ND 14 – Port of Entry	Western terminus
Rolette		23.304	37.504	US 281 / ND 3 – Peace Garden / Port of Entry, Dunseith	Eastern terminus
1.000 mi = 1.609 km; 1.000 km = 0.621 mi
