= North Dakota Highway 5 =

State highway in North Dakota, US

North Dakota Highway 5
- ND 5 highlighted in red

Route information
- Maintained by NDDOT
- Length: 335.813 mi (540.439 km)

Major junctions
- West end: MT 5 near Westby, MT
- US 85 in Fortuna; US 52 from Lignite to near Bowbells; US 83 from near Mohall to near Westhope; US 281 from Dunseith to Rock Lake; US 81 from Hamilton to Joliette; I-29 near Joliette
- East end: MN 175 near Joliette

Location
- Country: United States
- State: North Dakota
- Counties: Divide, Burke, Ward, Renville, Bottineau, Rolette, Towner, Cavalier, Pembina

Highway system
- North Dakota State Highway System; Interstate; US; State
← ND 4	→ ND 6

North Dakota Highway 5 (ND 5) is a 335.813-mile-long (540.439 km) east–west state highway in North Dakota. Its route is in the extreme north part of the state, near the Canada–United States border. The eastern terminus is located about four miles (6 km) east of Joliette at the Red River where the highway continues east as Minnesota State Highway 175. The western terminus is at North Dakota's western border about 12 miles (19 km) west of Fortuna where the highway continues west and turns into Montana Highway 5. The highway is mostly a two-lane road.

== Route description ==
ND 5 begins at the Montana state line near Westby, Montana, and goes east for 12 miles. Then it merges with US 85 and passes through Fortuna. Seven miles east of Fortuna, US 85 splits off southward, and ND 5 continues alone for six miles before merging with ND 42. After eight miles, ND 42 also branches off to the south, and ND 5 goes around the southwestern side of Crosby. ND 5 continues east for 13 miles, then overlaps with ND 40 for 10 miles before continuing east alone outside Columbus. At Seven Mile Corner, ND 5 merges with US 52, and they go east-southeast toward Minot. Near Bowbells, they briefly merge with ND 8 before ND 8 heads southwest into the city. About ten miles later, US 52 continues south into Minot, and ND 5 heads east again.

ND 5 and ND 28 run concurrently near Mohall, entering the city 5 miles later. ND 5 then intersects with US 83 and ND 256 after another 9 miles. US 83 and ND 5 run concurrently for 16 miles before US 83 heads north towards Westhope and the Canadian border. Further east, ND 5 runs concurrently with ND 14 for 8 miles before ND 14 turns north and ND 5 continues towards Bottineau. ND 5 intersects with the northern terminus of ND 60, 5 miles outside of Bottineau. ND 5 continues east for 12 miles into Dunseith, where it joins US 281 and intersects ND 3. The two highways run concurrently for approximately 40 miles, passing through Belcourt, intersecting ND 30 in Rolla, and intersecting ND 4. Near Rocklake, ND 5 splits from US 281, skirting the north side of the city.

14 miles to the east, ND 5 enters a concurrency with ND 20 for six miles and then continues east for twenty miles before entering the city of Langdon and intersecting ND 1. About another twenty miles to the east, ND 5 carries ND 32 for 3 miles, and then east-northeast into the city of Cavalier and joining ND 18 for a concurrency that lasts four miles. Five miles to the east, ND 5 carries US 81 all the way to I-29 (ten miles) and finally leaves North Dakota alone from any concurrency three miles later before crossing the Red River of the North and into the state of Minnesota as Minnesota State Highway 175.

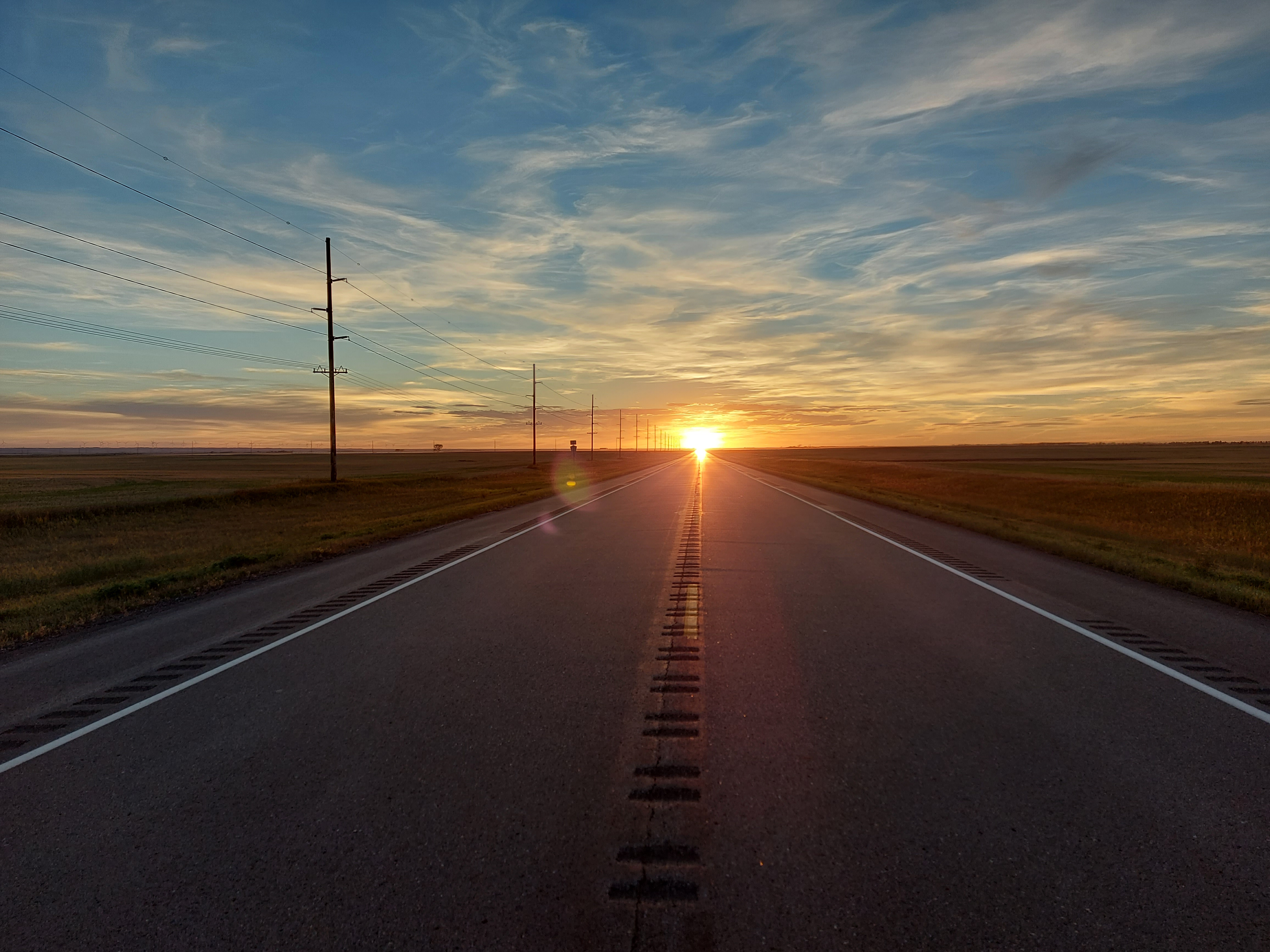
Sunset on Highway 5 on the 2021 Autumnal Equinox, near Columbus

== Major intersections ==
County	Location	mi	km	Destinations	Notes
Sheridan		0.000	0.000	MT 5 west – Plentywood, Scobey	Continuation into Montana
Divide		12.380	19.924	US 85 north – Port of Entry	Western end of US 85 concurrency
Divide		20.449	32.909	US 85 south – Williston	Eastern end of US 85 concurrency
Divide		26.372	42.442	ND 42 north – Ambrose	Western end of ND 42 concurrency
Divide	Crosby	34.327	55.244	ND 42 south	Eastern end of ND 42 concurrency
Divide	Noonan	48.694	78.365	ND 40 north – Estevan	Western end of ND 40 concurrency
Burke		58.665	94.412	ND 40 south – Tioga	Eastern end of ND 40 concurrency
Burke		69.632	112.062	US 52 north – Portal, Estevan	Western end of US 52 concurrency
Burke		82.577	132.895	ND 8 north – Northgate	Western end of ND 8 concurrency
Burke	Bowbells	92.828	149.392	ND 8 south – Bowbells, Stanley	Eastern end of ND 8 concurrency
Ward		99.605	160.299	US 52 south – Minot	Eastern end of US 52 concurrency
Renville		117.587	189.238	ND 28 south – Carpio	Western end of ND 28 concurrency
Renville		120.590	194.071	ND 28 north – Sherwood	Eastern end of ND 28 concurrency
Bottineau		135.563	218.168	US 83 south / ND 256 north	Western end of US 83 concurrency, southern terminus of ND 256
Bottineau		152.166	244.887	US 83 north	Eastern end of US 83 concurrency
Bottineau		166.199	267.471	ND 14 south – Kramer	Western end of ND 14 concurrency
Bottineau		174.190	280.332	ND 14 north	Eastern end of ND 14 concurrency
Bottineau		183.587	295.455	ND 60 south	Northern terminus of ND 60
Rolette	Dunseith	196.154	315.679	US 281 north / ND 3	Western end of US 281 concurrency
Rolette	Rolla	232.462	374.111	ND 30	
Towner		221.175	355.947	ND 4 north	Southern terminus of ND 4
Towner		236.105	379.974	US 281 south – Cando	Eastern end of US 281 concurrency
Cavalier		251.203	404.272	ND 20 north	Western end of ND 20 concurrency
Cavalier		256.966	413.547	ND 20 south	Eastern end of ND 20 concurrency
Cavalier	Langdon	278.967	448.954	ND 1	
Pembina		298.982	481.165	ND 32 north – Walhalla	Western end of ND 32 concurrency
Pembina		301.987	486.001	ND 32 south – Walhalla	Eastern end of ND 32 concurrency
Pembina	Cavalier	313.487	504.508	ND 18 south	Western end of ND 18 concurrency
Pembina		317.185	510.460	ND 18 north	Eastern end of ND 18 concurrency
Pembina	Hamilton	322.180	518.498	US 81 south – St. Thomas	Western end of US 81 concurrency
Pembina		332.003	534.307	I-29 / US 81 north – Grand Forks, Winnipeg	Eastern end of US 81 concurrency
Kittson		335.813	540.439	MN 175 east – Hallock	Continuation into Minnesota
1.000 mi = 1.609 km; 1.000 km = 0.621 mi: Concurrency terminus

== Sites of interest ==
- Turtle Mountain Chippewa Heritage Center in Belcourt
- Icelandic State Park near Cavalier
- Gunlogson Homestead and Nature Preserve in Cavalier
- Pioneer Heritage Center in Cavalier
