= North Dakota Highway 89 =

State highway in North Dakota, U.S.

North Dakota Highway 89

Route information
- Maintained by NDDOT
- Length: 1.960 mi (3.154 km)

Major junctions
- South end: Cavalier Air Force Station
- North end: ND 5 east of Langdon

Location
- Country: United States
- State: North Dakota
- Counties: Pembina

Highway system
- North Dakota State Highway System; Interstate; US; State
← US 85	→ ND 91

North Dakota Highway 89 (ND 89) is a 1.960-mile-long (3.154 km) north–south state highway in the U.S. state of North Dakota. ND 89's southern terminus is at the edge of the Cavalier Air Force Station, and the northern terminus is at ND 5 east of Langdon.

Highway 89 crosses the Tongue River near its southern end.

== Major intersections ==
The entire route is in Beaulieu Township, Pembina County.

mi	km	Destinations	Notes
0.000	0.000	91st Street NE	Southern terminus
1.960	3.154	ND 5	Northern terminus
1.000 mi = 1.609 km; 1.000 km = 0.621 mi
