= North Dakota Highway 3 =

State highway in North Dakota, United States

North Dakota Highway 3
- ND 3 highlighted in red

Route information
- Maintained by NDDOT
- Length: 247.530 mi (398.361 km)
- Existed: 1939–present

Major junctions
- South end: SD 45 south of Ashley
- I-94 north of Dawson; I-94 north of Steele; ND 200 in Hurdsfield; US 52 in Harvey; US 2 in Rugby; US 281 / ND 5 in Dunseith
- North end: US 281 / PTH 10 at the Canadian border north of Dunseith

Location
- Country: United States
- State: North Dakota
- Counties: McIntosh; Logan; Kidder; Wells; Pierce; Rolette

Highway system
- North Dakota State Highway System; Interstate; US; State
← US 2	→ ND 4

North Dakota Highway 3 (ND 3) is a 247.530-mile-long (398.361 km) major north–south state highway in North Dakota, United States, that spans the entire state. It travels from South Dakota Highway 45 (SD 45) at the South Dakota state line, south of Ashley north to Manitoba Highway 10 (PTH 10) at the International Peace Garden on the Canada–United States border.

== Route description ==
ND 3 starts at the South Dakota state line, where it meets SD 45. It runs north for 7 miles before turning left onto ND 11 in Ashley. ND 3 and ND 11 then run west for 8.5 miles before ND 3 turns north again. After 16.8 miles, it turns west onto ND 13 in Wishek. The two highways share the road until ND 3 turns right, continuing north towards I-94, passing through Napoleon and Dawson. At I-94, ND 3 merges and travels westbound for 7.7 miles before exiting the interstate at exit 200 in Steele.

ND 3 continues north from Steele for 41.2 miles where it intersects ND 36. It then turns right and shares a 2-mile concurrency with ND 200 near Hurdsfield. ND 3 continues north for 21 miles to US 52 in Harvey. Exiting Harvey, ND 3 proceeds north for 42.9 miles where it intersects ND 19 south of Rugby and US 2 in Rugby. It then meets the end of ND 17 and ND 60 about ten miles north of Rugby, and later, ND 66 near Rolette. ND 3 enters a concurrency with US 281 southeast of Dunseith and runs concurrently with it for 13.5 miles until they both end at the Canadian border just east of the International Peace Garden.

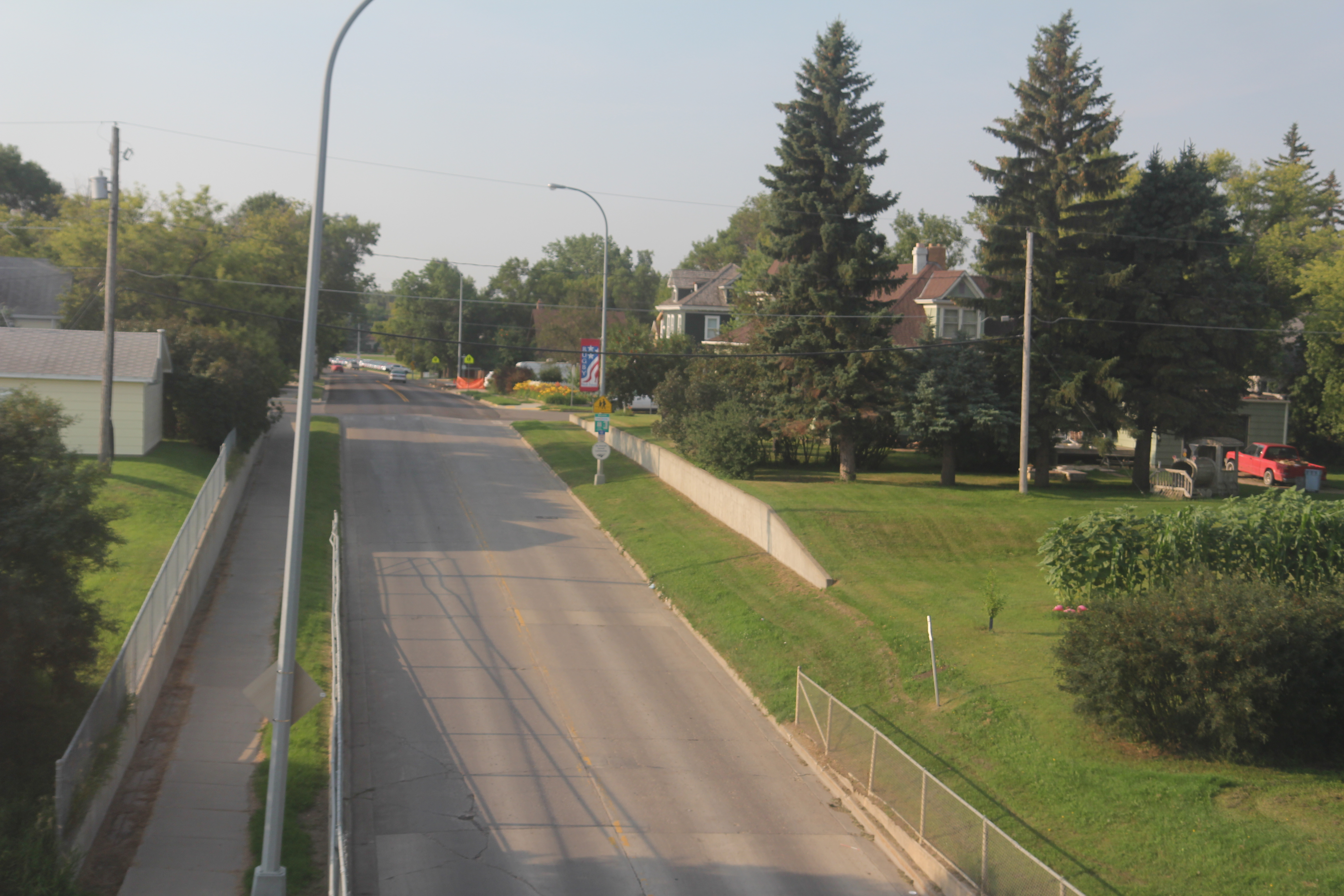
ND 3 in Rugby, August 2013

== Major intersections ==
County	Location	mi	km	Destinations	Notes
McIntosh		0.000	0.000	SD 45 south (341st Street) – Leola	Southern terminus; continuation into South Dakota as South Dakota Highway 45
McIntosh	Ashley	6.810	10.960	ND 11 east (W Main Street) – Ellendale	Eastern end of ND 11 concurrency
McIntosh		15.193	24.451	ND 11 west (96th Street SE) – Hague	Western end of ND 11 concurrency
McIntosh	Wishek	31.974	51.457	ND 13 east (Beaver Avenue) – Lehr	Eastern end of ND 13 concurrency
McIntosh		41.862	67.370	ND 13 west (80th Street SE) – Linton	Western end of ND 13 concurrency
Logan	Napoleon	59.566	95.862	ND 34 (62nd Ave SE) – Hazelton	
Kidder	Sibley Township	85.111	136.973	I-94 east – Fargo	Eastern end of I-94 concurrency; I-94 Exit 208; diamond interchange
Kidder	Sibley–Woodlawn township line	88.742	142.816	Robinson	I-94 Exit 205; diamond interchange
Kidder	Woodlawn Township	93.053	149.754	I-94 west – Bismarck	Western end of I-94 concurrency; I-94 Exit 200; diamond interchange
Kidder	Clear Lake Township	113.232	182.229	ND 36 (19th Street SE) – Robinson, Tuttle	
Wells	Bull Moose Township	134.277	216.098	ND 200 west (2nd Street NE) – Goodrich, McClusky	Western end of ND 200 concurrency
Wells	Hurdsfield	136.278	219.318	ND 200 east (2nd Street NE) – Carrington	Eastern end of ND 200 concurrency
Wells	Forward Township	157.366	253.256	US 52 east (23rd Street NE) / US 52 Bus. north (31st Avenue NE) – Fessenden, Harvey	Southern end of US 52 concurrency; southern terminus of US 52 Bus.
Wells	Hillsdale Township	159.341	256.434	US 52 west – Minot	Northern end of US 52 concurrency
Wells	Hillsdale Township	159.630	256.900	US 52 Bus. (10th Street W)	
Wells	Hillsdale Township	159.863	257.275	ND 91 west – Minot	Short Spur to US 52
Pierce		177.190	285.160	ND 19 (42nd Street NE) – Esmond	
Pierce	Rugby	201.386	324.099	US 2 (65th Street NE) – Devils Lake, Minot	
Pierce		212.311	341.681	ND 17 east / ND 60 north (75th Street NE) – Wolford, Cando, Willow City	Western terminus of ND 17; southern terminus of ND 60
Rolette	Kohlmeier Township	224.336	361.034	ND 66 east (87th Street NE) – Rolette	Western terminus of ND 66
Rolette	Dunseith	233.548	375.859	US 281 south / ND 5 east (96th Street NE) – Belcourt	Eastern end of ND 5 concurrency; southern end of US 281 concurrency
Rolette	Dunseith	233.987	376.566	ND 5 west (96th Street NE) – Bottineau	Western end of ND 5 concurrency
Rolette		244.140	392.905	ND 43 west (106th Street NE) – Lake Metigoshe State Park	Eastern terminus of ND 43
Rolette		247.530	398.361	PTH 10 north – Boissevain, Brandon	Northern terminus; continuation into Manitoba as Manitoba Highway 10; northern end of US 281 concurrency
1.000 mi = 1.609 km; 1.000 km = 0.621 mi: Concurrency terminus

== See also ==
- List of state highways in North Dakota
- List of highways numbered 3
