= North Dakota Highway 4 =

Highway in North Dakota

North Dakota Highway 4
- ND 4 highlighted in red

Route information
- Maintained by NDDOT
- Length: 10.283 mi (16.549 km)
- Existed: 1997–present

Major junctions
- South end: US 281 / ND 5 in Armourdale
- North end: PTH 5 at the Canadian border near Hansboro

Location
- Country: United States
- State: North Dakota
- Counties: Towner

Highway system
- North Dakota State Highway System; Interstate; US; State
| ← ND 3 | → ND 5 |
| ← ND 68 | → ND 73 |

North Dakota Highway 4 (ND 4) is a 10.283-mile-long (16.549 km) north–south state highway in northern North Dakota, connecting U.S. Route 281 (US 281) and ND 5 near Rocklake to Manitoba Highway 5 at the Canada–US border at the Hansboro–Cartwright Border Crossing.

== Route description ==
ND 4 begins at a four-way intersection with concurrent highways US 281 and ND 5 along a roadway named 61st Avenue. The highway continues north through sparsely populated Armourdale as a two-lane undivided highway intersecting County Route 4 in Hansboro before turning east at 108th Street and then returning to a northerly direction until its end at the Canada–US border.

== History ==
Highway 69
- Location: Armourdale to Canada–US border
- Existed: 1969–1997

This route was known as Highway 69 until 1997, possibly due to the sexual connotation of the number.

== Major intersections ==
The entire route is in Towner County.

| Location | mi | km | Destinations | Notes |
|---|---|---|---|---|
| Armourdale Township | 0.000 | 0.000 | 61st Avenue NE | Continuation beyond southern terminus |
| Armourdale Township | 0.000 | 0.000 | US 281 / ND 5 – Rocklake, Rolla | Southern terminus |
| Sidney Township | 10.283 | 16.549 | PTH 5 north – Cartwright | Continuation into Manitoba |
1.000 mi = 1.609 km; 1.000 km = 0.621 mi
