= North Dakota Highway 91 (Wells County) =

State highway in North Dakota, U.S.

North Dakota Highway 91

Route information
- Maintained by NDDOT
- Length: 0.523 mi (842 m)

Major junctions
- West end: US 52 in Harvey
- East end: ND 3 in Harvey

Location
- Country: United States
- State: North Dakota
- Counties: Wells

Highway system
- North Dakota State Highway System; Interstate; US; State
← ND 89	→ ND 97

North Dakota Highway 91 (ND 91) is a 0.523-mile-long (0.842 km) east–west state highway in the U.S. state of North Dakota. ND 91's western terminus is at U.S. Route 52 (US 52) in Harvey, and the eastern terminus is at ND 3 in Harvey.

== Major intersections ==
The entire route is in Harvey, Wells County.

mi	km	Destinations	Notes
0.000	0.000	US 52	Western terminus
0.523	0.842	ND 3	Eastern terminus
1.000 mi = 1.609 km; 1.000 km = 0.621 mi
