= North Dakota Highway 210 =

State highway in North Dakota, U.S.

North Dakota Highway 210
- ND 210 highlighted in red

Route information
- Maintained by NDDOT
- Length: 2.937 mi (4.727 km)

Major junctions
- West end: ND 13 in Wahpeton
- East end: MN 210 in Breckenridge

Location
- Country: United States
- State: North Dakota
- Counties: Richland

Highway system
- North Dakota State Highway System; Interstate; US; State
← ND 200A	→ ND 256

North Dakota Highway 210 (ND 210) is a 2.937-mile-long (4.727 km) east–west state highway in the U.S. state of North Dakota. It serves as a bypass of Wahpeton.

== Route description ==
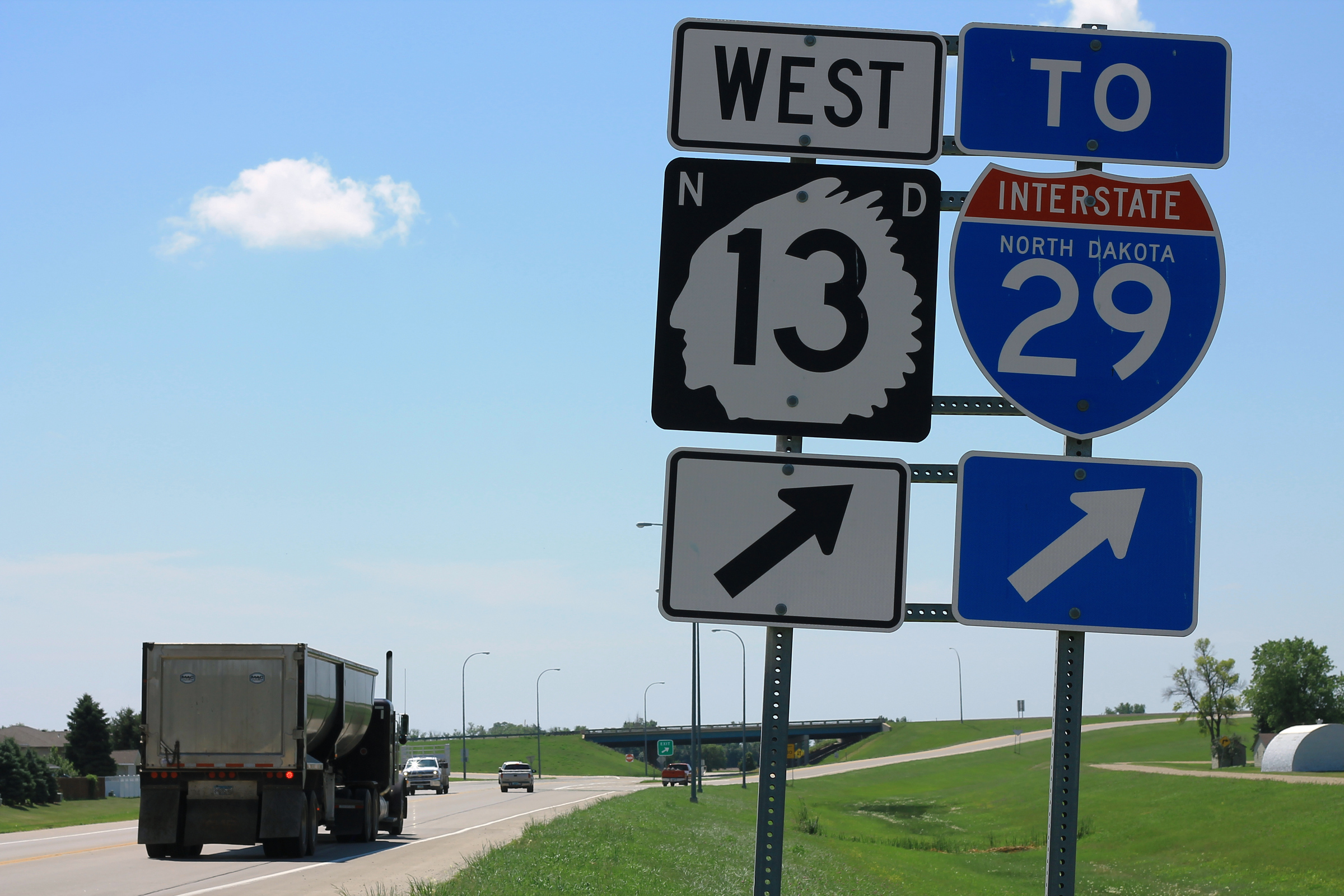
ND 210 approaching its western terminus

The route begins at an interchange with Highway 13 west of Wahpeton. It travels north from there before heading east. It then crosses the Red River and into Minnesota, where it runs into its eastern terminus with MN-210 in Breckenridge.

== Major intersections ==
The entire route is in Richland County.

Location	mi	km	Destinations	Notes
Wahpeton	0.000	0.000	ND 13 to I-29	Interchange; western terminus
Red River	2.937	4.727	North Dakota–Minnesota line	
Red River	2.937	4.727	MN 210 east to US 75 – Breckenridge, Fergus Falls	Continuation into Minnesota
1.000 mi = 1.609 km; 1.000 km = 0.621 mi

== Gallery ==
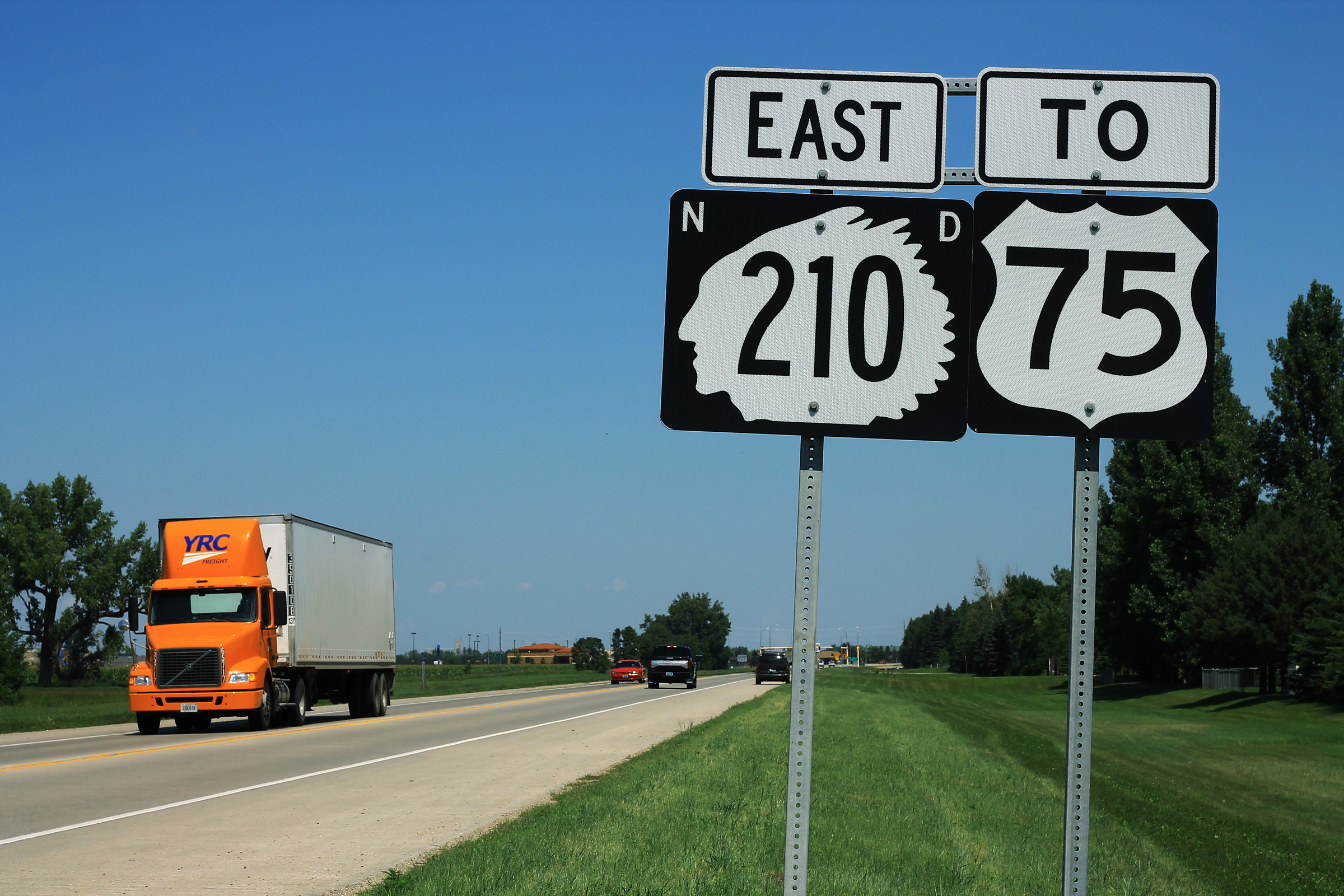
