= North Dakota Highway 256 =

State highway in North Dakota, U.S.

North Dakota Highway 256

Route information
- Maintained by NDDOT
- Length: 16.406 mi (26.403 km)
- Existed: c. 1970–present

Major junctions
- South end: US 83 / ND 5 east of Mohall
- North end: PR 256 at the Canadian border near Antler

Location
- Country: United States
- State: North Dakota
- Counties: Bottineau

Highway system
- North Dakota State Highway System; Interstate; US; State
← ND 210	→ US 281

North Dakota Highway 256 (ND 256) is a 16.406-mile-long (26.403 km) north-south state highway in the U.S. state of North Dakota. ND 256's southern terminus is at U.S. Route 83 (US 83) east of Mohall, and the northern terminus is a continuation as Manitoba Provincial Road 256 (PR 256) at the Lyleton Port of Entry at the Manitoba border.

== Major intersections ==
The entire route is in Bottineau County.

Location	mi	km	Destinations	Notes
	0.000	0.000	US 83 / ND 5	Southern terminus
	16.406	26.403	PR 256	Continuation into Manitoba
1.000 mi = 1.609 km; 1.000 km = 0.621 mi
