= North Dakota Highway 60 =

State highway in North Dakota, U.S.

North Dakota Highway 60

Route information
- Maintained by NDDOT
- Length: 29.878 mi (48.084 km)
- Existed: c. 1934–present

Major junctions
- South end: ND 3 / ND 17 north of Rugby
- North end: ND 5 east of Bottineau

Location
- Country: United States
- State: North Dakota
- Counties: Bottineau, Pierce

Highway system
- North Dakota State Highway System; Interstate; US; State
← ND 59	→ ND 65

North Dakota Highway 60 (ND 60) is a 29.878-mile-long (48.084 km) east–west state highway in the U.S. state of North Dakota. ND 60's southern terminus is at ND 3 and the western terminus of ND 17 north of Rugby, and the northern terminus is at ND 5 east of Bottineau.

== Major intersections ==
County	Location	mi	km	Destinations	Notes
Pierce		0.000	0.000	ND 3 / ND 17 east	Southern terminus, western terminus of ND 17
Bottineau		29.878	48.084	ND 5	Northern terminus
1.000 mi = 1.609 km; 1.000 km = 0.621 mi
