= Minnesota State Highway 317 =

State highway in Minnesota, United States

Trunk Highway 317
- MN 317 highlighted in red

Route information
- Maintained by MnDOT
- Length: 1.444 mi (2.324 km)
- Existed: April 24, 1959–present

Major junctions
- West end: ND 17 at the Red River
- East end: MN 220 at Fork Township

Location
- Country: United States
- State: Minnesota
- Counties: Marshall

Highway system
- Minnesota Trunk Highway System; Interstate; US; State; Legislative; Scenic
← MN 316	→ MN 332

Minnesota State Highway 317 (MN 317) is a short 1.444-mile-long (2.324 km) highway in northwest Minnesota, which runs from North Dakota Highway 17 at the North Dakota state line, at the Red River, and continues east to its eastern terminus at its intersection with Minnesota State Highway 220 in Fork Township.

== Route description ==
Highway 317 serves as a short east–west connector route in northwest Minnesota between State Highway 220 and North Dakota Highway 17. Highway 17 continues west to nearby Interstate 29 and the city of Grafton, North Dakota. The short route of Highway 317 is located between the Red River and the Snake River.

== History ==
MN 317 was authorized on April 24, 1959. The route was paved in 1963.

== Major intersections ==
The entire route is in Fork Township, Marshall County.

mi	km	Destinations	Notes
0.000	0.000	ND 17 – Grafton	Red River of the North crossing; Western terminus; continuation into North Dakota
0.440	0.708	CSAH 41	
1.444	2.324	MN 220 – MN 11, East Grand Forks	Eastern terminus
1.000 mi = 1.609 km; 1.000 km = 0.621 mi
