= Neil LeVang =

American musician (1932–2015)

- Born: January 3, 1932; Adams, North Dakota, U.S.
- Died: January 26, 2015 (aged 83) Canyon Country, California, U.S.
- Occupation: Musician
- Instruments: Guitar, violin, banjo
- Formerly of: Lawrence Welk

Neil LeVang (January 3, 1932 – January 26, 2015) was an American musician who was best known from television's The Lawrence Welk Show, playing guitar, violin and banjo.

== Biography ==
The younger of two boys, LeVang was born in Adams, North Dakota, a farmer's son of Swedish and Norwegian descent. He got his start playing the banjo and soon added guitar and violin. As a young boy, LeVang moved with his family between Adams, North Dakota, and Bemidji, Minnesota, before migrating west. They settled in Riverside, California, when LeVang was thirteen. At the age of fifteen, he was playing with area bands and establishing himself as a versatile and accomplished stringed instrumentalist. In 1948, LeVang appeared with Foy Willing and the Riders of the Purple Sage, as well as Jimmy Wakely and several other country swing bands.

LeVang joined the United States Coast Guard in 1951 which took him to Seattle, Washington. There he continued in the music scene playing with "Texas Jim Lewis and his Lonestar Cowboys". He also hosted his own radio show. In 1959, he was hired as a temporary guitar and banjo player on The Lawrence Welk Show when Buddy Merrill left to serve in the United States Army. Welk was so pleased with his ability that he hired LeVang on a permanent basis when Buddy completed his tour of duty in 1961. LeVang stayed with the Welk Band until its final show in 1982. That same year, at the Country Music Association Awards he was nominated for best artist on a specialty instrument, the mandolin. He was also an accomplished studio musician, playing on several records for artists such as Glen Campbell, Frank Zappa, Bobby Darin, Bobbie Gentry, David Clayton-Thomas, Neal Hefti ("Batman Theme"), Elvis Presley, Dean Martin, Neil Diamond and Noel Boggs.

LeVang performed as a studio musician on many television shows, including Little House on the Prairie, The Ed Sullivan Show, The Brady Bunch, The Monkees, Highway to Heaven, Green Acres, Petticoat Junction, and a host of Hanna-Barbera cartoons. He was the featured guitarist with Naomi and Wynonna Judd on the 1985 and 1986 Academy of Country Music Association Awards television broadcast. He was the subject of an extensive career profile by historian Rich Kienzle in the December 2009 issue of Vintage Guitar.

LeVang unknowingly created a new genre of music that would eventually be called surf rock with his 1961 arrangement of "Ghost Riders In the Sky", performed on The Lawrence Welk Show.

LeVang died in Canyon Country, California, at the age of 83.

== Film credits as a musician ==
Neil also worked on music for several Hollywood motion pictures. His film credits include:

- All the President's Men
- The Apple Dumpling Gang
- At Long Last Love
- Barefoot in the Park
- Beyond the Valley of the Dolls
- Bless the Beasts and the Children
- Blue Hawaii
- California Suite
- Charlotte's Web
- Dead Again
- Dick Tracy
- Emperor of the North
- For Pete's Sake
- Friday Foster
- Goin' South
- Good Morning, Vietnam
- Hardcore
- Herbie Goes Bananas
- Herbie Goes to Monte Carlo
- Hooper
- Hot Lead and Cold Feet
- Huckleberry Finn
- Hustle
- I'll Take Sweden
- The Last Hard Men
- The Life and Times of Judge Roy Bean
- Live a Little, Love a Little
- The Man Who Loved Cat Dancing
- Nickelodeon
- Paint Your Wagon
- Pajama Party
- Pennies from Heaven
- Pete's Dragon
- Rosemary's Baby
- Smokey and the Bandit
- Sophie's Choice
- Thank God It's Friday
- Tony Rome
- True Grit
- Twice Upon a Time
- Zorro, The Gay Blade
