= North Dakota Highway 91 =

North Dakota Highway 91 may refer to:

- North Dakota Highway 91 (Pembina County)
- North Dakota Highway 91 (Wells County)
