= Minnesota State Highway 332 =

State highway in Minnesota, United States

Trunk Highway 332
- MN 332 highlighted in red

Route information
- Maintained by MnDOT
- Length: 7.220 mi (11.619 km)
- Existed: April 9, 1974–May 20, 2011

Major junctions
- West end: US 71 / MN 11 in Rainy Lake
- US 53 in Rainy Lake
- North end: MN 11 in International Falls

Location
- Country: United States
- State: Minnesota
- Counties: Koochiching

Highway system
- Minnesota Trunk Highway System; Interstate; US; State; Legislative; Scenic
← MN 317	→ MN 336

Minnesota State Highway 332 (MN 332) was a short 7.220-mile-long (11.619 km) highway in north-central Minnesota, which ran from its intersection with US Highway 71 / State Highway 11 (US 71 / MN 11), immediately southwest of International Falls, and continued eastbound to its junction with U.S. Highway 53; then the roadway changed direction to northbound; continuing to its northern terminus at its intersection with Trunk Highway 11 on the northeast side of International Falls.

== Route description ==
MN 332 was a short highway bypassing the south side of International Falls, serving as a dedicated truck route. The route was located in Koochiching County; and partially within the city limits of International Falls.

The roadway ran east–west between US 71 and US 53; and then ran north–south from US 53 to MN 11 on the east side of International Falls. Legally, MN 332 was defined as Route 332 in the Minnesota Statutes § 161.115(263).

== History ==
MN 332 was authorized on April 9, 1974. The highway designation replaced County State-Aid Highway 102 (CSAH 102) between US 71 and US 53 and CSAH 114 north to MN 11.

Since February 2002, a dispute has been ongoing between the city of International Falls and Koochiching County over relocation of the northern portion of MN 332. Koochiching County has supported a turnback offered by Minnesota Department of Transportation (MnDOT) that will give the county jurisdiction over a portion of MN 332; essentially all of MN 332 east of US 53. Most of the dispute involves a 1989 agreement that could have provided the city with money and jurisdiction over the Burner Road portion of MN 332. If the dispute is resolved, MN 332, east of US 53, is proposed to become County Road 155. In May 2010, the Koochiching County Board accepted an agreement that would turn control of the road east of US 53 to the county in exchange for $3.5 million.

On May 20, 2011, the law establishing MN 332 was repealed. The repeal will be effective when MnDOT certifies that the unspecified conditions to transfer the route have been satisfied.

== Major intersections ==
The entire route was in Koochiching County.

Location	mi	km	Destinations	Notes
Rainy Lake	0.000	0.000	US 71 / MN 11	
Rainy Lake	0.036	0.058	CR 69	
Rainy Lake	0.540	0.869	CSAH 2 south	Western end of CSAH 2 concurrency
Rainy Lake	1.038	1.670	CSAH 2 north	Eastern end of CSAH 2 concurrency
Rainy Lake	2.040	3.283	CSAH 108 south	Western end of CSAH 108 concurrency
Rainy Lake	2.540	4.088	CSAH 108 north	Eastern end of CSAH 108 concurrency
Rainy Lake	3.042	4.896	US 53	
Rainy Lake	4.090	6.582	CSAH 24	
International Falls	5.587	8.991	CR 129	
International Falls	6.610	10.638	CSAH 24 (3rd Avenue East)	
International Falls	7.220	11.619	MN 11	
1.000 mi = 1.609 km; 1.000 km = 0.621 mi: Concurrency terminus
