= Fork Township, Marshall County, Minnesota =

Fork Township, Minnesota
- Township
- Location of Fork Township, within Marshall County, Minnesota
- Coordinates: 48°24′16″N 97°5′58″W
- Country: United States
- State: Minnesota
- County: Marshall

Area
  - Total: 27.1 sq mi (70.2 km^{2})
  - Land: 26.6 sq mi (68.9 km^{2})
  - Water: 0.50 sq mi (1.3 km^{2})
- Elevation: 790 ft (240 m)

Population (2020)
  - Total: 7
  - Density: 0.26/sq mi (0.10/km^{2})
- Time zone: UTC-6 (Central (CST))
  - Summer (DST): UTC-5 (CDT)
- FIPS code: 27-21878
- GNIS feature ID: 0664198

Fork Township is a township in Marshall County, Minnesota, United States. The population was seven at the 2020 census.

Fork Township was organized in 1896, and named for a fork in the river.

== Geography ==
According to the United States Census Bureau, the township has a total area of 27.1 square miles (70 km^{2}), of which 26.6 square miles (69 km^{2}) is land and 0.5 square miles (1.3 km^{2}) (1.85%) is water.

== Demographics ==
As of the census of 2000, there were 14 people, 6 households, and 3 families residing in the township. The population density was 0.5 inhabitants per square mile (0.19/km^{2}). There were 11 housing units at an average density of 0.4 per square mile (0.15/km^{2}). The racial makeup of the township was 100.00% White.

There were 6 households, out of which 16.7% had children under the age of 18 living with them, 50.0% were married couples living together, and 50.0% were non-families. 33.3% of all households were made up of individuals, and 33.3% had someone living alone who was 65 years of age or older. The average household size was 2.33 and the average family size was 3.00.

In the township the population was spread out, with 21.4% under the age of 18, 21.4% from 18 to 24, 14.3% from 25 to 44, 28.6% from 45 to 64, and 14.3% who were 65 years of age or older. The median age was 36 years. For every 100 females, there were 250.0 males. For every 100 females age 18 and over, there were 266.7 males.

The median income for a household in the township was $31,250, and the median income for a family was $31,250. Males had a median income of $17,083 versus $11,250 for females. The per capita income for the township was $5,868. There are 40.0% of families living below the poverty line and 31.6% of the population, including none of the under eighteens and none of those over 64.
