= Minnesota State Highway 175 =

State highway in Minnesota, United States

Trunk Highway 175
- MN 175 highlighted in red

Route information
- Maintained by MnDOT
- Length: 21.200 mi (34.118 km)
- Existed: 1963–present

Major junctions
- West end: ND 5 at the Red River near Joliette, ND
- US 75 at Hallock
- East end: US 59 / CR 36 at Hazelton Township

Location
- Country: United States
- State: Minnesota
- Counties: Kittson

Highway system
- Minnesota Trunk Highway System; Interstate; US; State; Legislative; Scenic
← MN 172	→ MN 194

Minnesota State Highway 175 (MN 175) is a 21.200-mile-long (34.118 km) state highway in northwest Minnesota, which runs from North Dakota Highway 5 (ND 5) at the North Dakota state line and continues east to its eastern terminus at its intersection with U.S. Highway 59 (US 59) near Lake Bronson.

The route passes through the city of Hallock.

== Route description ==
MN 175 serves as an east–west route between Lake Bronson, Hallock, the Red River, and Joliette, North Dakota.

The route is also known as Broadway Street in Hallock.

The Middle Branch Two Rivers follows MN 175 throughout its route.

The route is located in the Red River Valley region.

== History ==
MN 175 was authorized in 1963 between US 75 at Hallock and the North Dakota state line. The MN 175/ND 5 bridge crossing the Red River at the state line was not completed until the late 1960s. The section of MN 175 between US 75 at Hallock and US 59 in Hazelton Township was authorized in 1972.

MN 175 was paved by the late 1960s between Hallock and the state line after completion of the Red River bridge crossing. The section of MN 175 between Hallock and Hazelton Township had been paved prior to becoming a state highway.

MN 175 was numbered for its association with US 75.

== Major intersections ==
The entire route is in Kittson County.

Location	mi	km	Destinations	Notes
Red River of the North	0.000	0.000	ND 5 west – Cavalier	
Hallock	10.012	16.113	US 75 – Warren, Canada	
Hazelton Township	21.235	34.174	US 59 / CSAH 36 east – Lake Bronson, Karlstad, Canada	
1.000 mi = 1.609 km; 1.000 km = 0.621 mi
