= Pierce County, North Dakota =

County in North Dakota, United States

- County
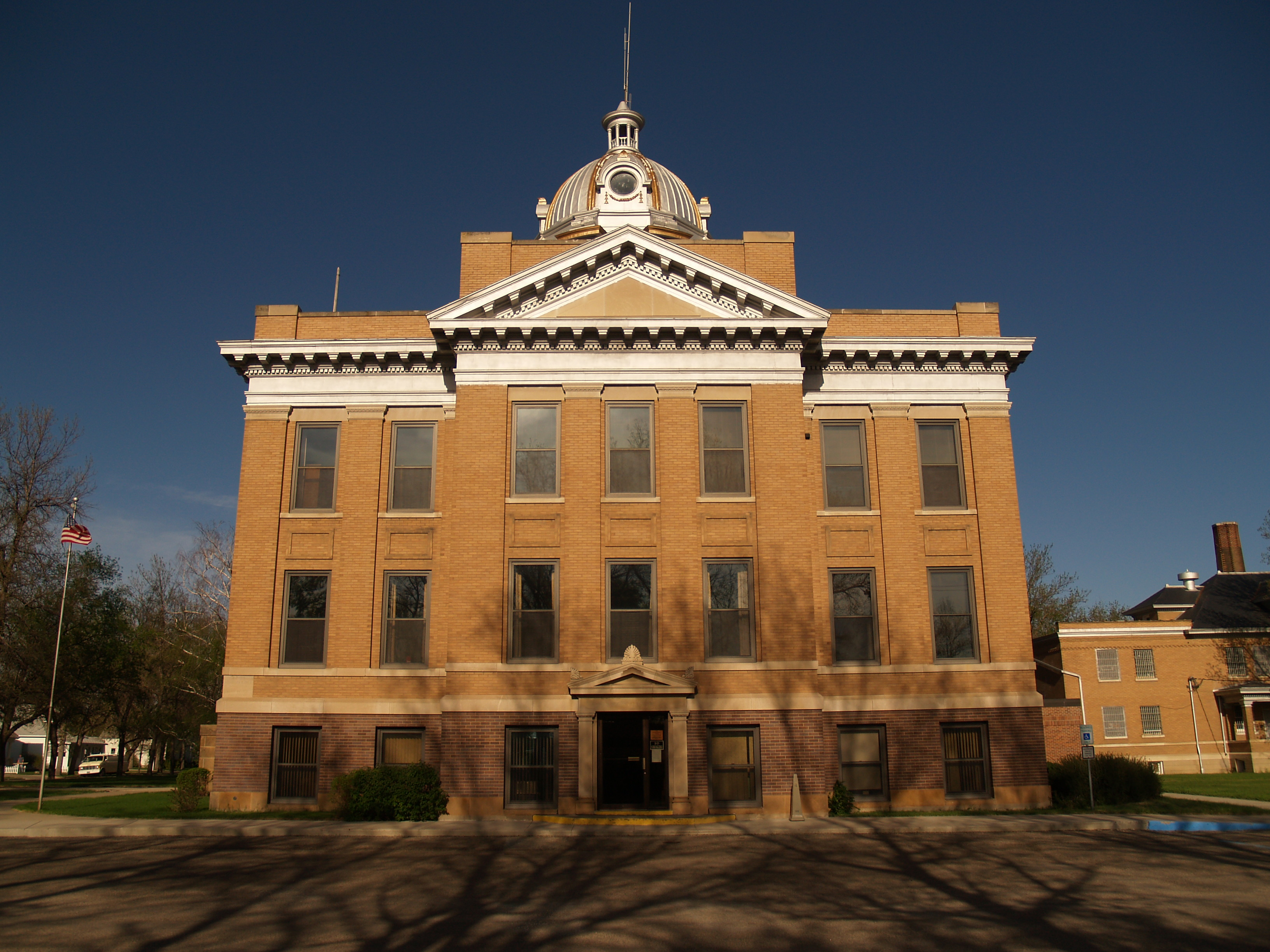
- The Pierce County Courthouse in Rugby

- Location within the U.S. state of North Dakota
- Coordinates: 48.238883°N 99.966497°W
- Country: United States
- State: North Dakota
- Founded: March 11, 1887 (created); April 6, 1889 (organized)
- Named for: Gilbert A. Pierce
- Seat: Rugby
- Largest city: Rugby

Area
  - Total: 1,082.466 sq mi (2,803.57 km^{2})
  - Land: 1,018.285 sq mi (2,637.35 km^{2})
  - Water: 64.181 sq mi (166.23 km^{2}) 5.93%

Population (2020)
  - Total: 3,990
  - Estimate (2025): 3,838 ▼
  - Density: 3.784/sq mi (1.461/km^{2})
- Time zone: UTC−6 (Central)
  - Summer (DST): UTC−5 (CDT)
- Area code: 701
- Congressional district: At-large
- Website: piercecountynd.gov

Pierce County is a county in the U.S. state of North Dakota. As of the 2020 census, the population was 3,990, and was estimated to be 3,838 in 2025. The county seat and the largest city is Rugby.

== History ==
The Dakota Territory legislature created the county on March 11, 1887, with areas partitioned from Bottineau, Rolette, McHenry and the now-extinct DeSmet counties. It was named for Gilbert A. Pierce, a Dakotas political figure. The county was not organized at that time, nor was it attached to another county for administrative or judicial purposes. It was attached to McHenry County on February 4, 1889, but that lasted only two months; on April 6 the county government was affected and the attachment to McHenry was terminated.

The county's boundaries were enlarged on November 8, 1892, when Church County was dissolved and a portion of its territory was annexed into Pierce.

The geographical center of North America is in Pierce County, approximately six miles (9.7 km) west of Balta. Rugby has a monument for the center at the intersection of US 2 and ND 3.

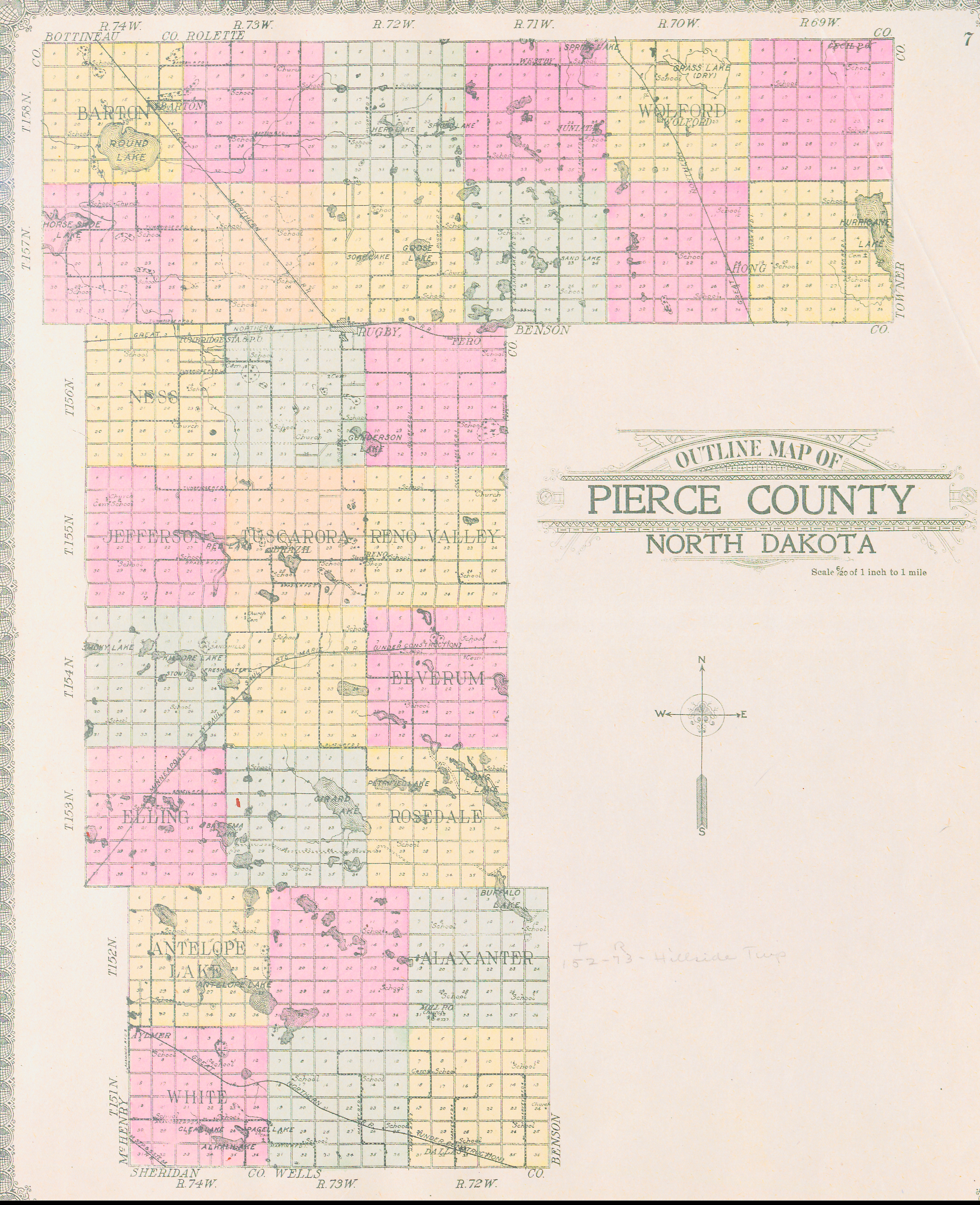
Outline map of Pierce County, North Dakota, 1910

== Geography ==
The North Fork of the Sheyenne River flows easterly through central Pierce County. The county terrain consists of rolling hills, mostly devoted to agriculture. The terrain generally slopes to the north and east, with its highest point a hill near the SW county corner, at 1,634 ft (498 m) ASL.

According to the United States Census Bureau, the county has a total area of 1,082.466 square miles (2,803.57 km^{2}), of which 1,018.285 square miles (2,637.35 km^{2}) is land and 64.181 square miles (166.23 km^{2}) (5.93%) is water. It is the 37th largest county in North Dakota by total area.

=== Major highways ===
- U.S. Highway 2
- U.S. Highway 52
- North Dakota Highway 3
- North Dakota Highway 17
- North Dakota Highway 19
- North Dakota Highway 60

=== Transit ===
- Amtrak Empire Builder (Rugby station)

=== Adjacent counties ===
- Rolette County - north
- Towner County - northeast
- Benson County - east
- Wells County - southeast
- Sheridan County - southwest
- McHenry County - west
- Bottineau County - northwest

=== Protected areas ===
- Boyer National Wildlife Refuge
- Buffalo Lake National Wildlife Refuge
- Hurricane Lake National Wildlife Refuge
- Meyer Township National Wildlife Refuge

=== Lakes ===
- Antelope Lakes
- Aylmer Lake (part)
- Battema Lake
- Buffalo Lake
- Clear Lake
- Davis Lake
- Girard Lake
- Goose Lake
- Gunderson Lake
- Guss Lake
- Horseshoe Lake
- Kilgore Lake
- Lesmeister Lake
- Long Lake
- Petrified Lake
- Ranch Lake
- Round Lake
- Sand Lake
- Smoky Lake (part)
- Twin Lakes (part)

== Demographics ==
Historical population
Census	Pop.	Note	%±
1890	905		—
1900	4,765		426.5%
1910	9,740		104.4%
1920	9,283		−4.7%
1930	9,074		−2.3%
1940	9,208		1.5%
1950	8,326		−9.6%
1960	7,394		−11.2%
1970	6,323		−14.5%
1980	6,166		−2.5%
1990	5,052		−18.1%
2000	4,675		−7.5%
2010	4,357		−6.8%
2020	3,990		−8.4%
2025 (est.)	3,838	▼	−3.8%
U.S. Decennial Census; 1790–1960 1900–1990; 1990–2000 2010–2020

As of the fourth quarter of 2024, the median home value in Pierce County was $151,940.

As of the 2023 American Community Survey, there are 1,840 estimated households in Pierce County with an average of 2.07 persons per household. The county has a median household income of $63,214. Approximately 11.0% of the county's population lives at or below the poverty line. Pierce County has an estimated 59.9% employment rate, with 27.9% of the population holding a bachelor's degree or higher and 93.9% holding a high school diploma.

The top five reported ancestries (people were allowed to report up to two ancestries, thus the figures will generally add to more than 100%) were English (97.4%), Spanish (0.3%), Indo-European (1.8%), Asian and Pacific Islander (0.5%), and Other (0.0%).

The median age in the county was 44.3 years.

Pierce County, North Dakota – racial and ethnic composition
Note: the US Census treats Hispanic/Latino as an ethnic category. This table excludes Latinos from the racial categories and assigns them to a separate category. Hispanics/Latinos may be of any race.

Race / ethnicity (NH = non-Hispanic)	Pop. 1980	Pop. 1990	Pop. 2000	Pop. 2010	Pop. 2020
White alone (NH)	6,079 (98.59%)	5,011 (99.19%)	4,584 (98.05%)	4,084 (93.73%)	3,611 (90.50%)
Black or African American alone (NH)	0 (0.00%)	2 (0.04%)	4 (0.09%)	19 (0.44%)	36 (0.90%)
Native American or Alaska Native alone (NH)	20 (0.32%)	23 (0.46%)	32 (0.68%)	169 (3.88%)	146 (3.66%)
Asian alone (NH)	28 (0.45%)	15 (0.30%)	12 (0.26%)	3 (0.07%)	17 (0.43%)
Pacific Islander alone (NH)	—	—	0 (0.00%)	1 (0.02%)	5 (0.13%)
Other race alone (NH)	14 (0.23%)	0 (0.00%)	0 (0.00%)	4 (0.09%)	10 (0.25%)
Mixed race or multiracial (NH)	—	—	15 (0.32%)	33 (0.76%)	93 (2.33%)
Hispanic or Latino (any race)	25 (0.41%)	1 (0.02%)	28 (0.60%)	44 (1.01%)	72 (1.80%)
Total	6,166 (100.00%)	5,052 (100.00%)	4,675 (100.00%)	4,357 (100.00%)	3,990 (100.00%)

=== 2024 estimate ===
As of the 2024 estimate, there were 3,853 people and 1,840 households residing in the county. There were 2,049 housing units at an average density of 2.01 per square mile (0.8/km^{2}). The racial makeup of the county was 90.9% White (89.2% NH White), 0.8% African American, 5.1% Native American, 1.4% Asian, 0.0% Pacific Islander, _% from some other races and 1.8% from two or more races. Hispanic or Latino people of any race were 2.1% of the population.

=== 2020 census ===
As of the 2020 census, there were 3,990 people, 1,719 households, and 1,041 families residing in the county. The population density was 3.92 inhabitants per square mile (1.5/km^{2}). There were 2,040 housing units at an average density of 2.00 per square mile (0.8/km^{2}).

Of the residents, 22.4% were under the age of 18 and 24.7% were 65 years of age or older; the median age was 46.3 years. For every 100 females there were 102.1 males, and for every 100 females age 18 and over there were 102.6 males.

The racial makeup of the county was 91.2% White, 1.0% Black or African American, 3.7% American Indian and Alaska Native, 0.4% Asian, 0.7% from some other race, and 3.0% from two or more races. Hispanic or Latino residents of any race comprised 1.8% of the population.

There were 1,719 households in the county, of which 23.9% had children under the age of 18 living with them and 23.6% had a female householder with no spouse or partner present. About 34.0% of all households were made up of individuals and 17.1% had someone living alone who was 65 years of age or older.

There were 2,040 housing units, of which 15.7% were vacant. Among occupied housing units, 78.7% were owner-occupied and 21.3% were renter-occupied. The homeowner vacancy rate was 1.8% and the rental vacancy rate was 18.3%.

=== 2010 census ===
As of the 2010 census, there were 4,357 people, 1,835 households, and 1,145 families residing in the county. The population density was 4.28 inhabitants per square mile (1.7/km^{2}). There were 2,199 housing units at an average density of 2.16 per square mile (0.8/km^{2}). The racial makeup of the county was 94.10% White, 0.46% African American, 3.90% Native American, 0.07% Asian, 0.02% Pacific Islander, 0.67% from some other races and 0.78% from two or more races. Hispanic or Latino people of any race were 1.01% of the population.

In terms of ancestry, 52.3% were German, 34.5% were Norwegian, 5.5% were Irish, and 2.0% were American.

Of the 1,835 households, 24.5% had children under the age of 18 living with them, 52.8% were married couples living together, 5.9% had a female householder with no husband present, 37.6% were non-families, and 34.3% of all households were made up of individuals. The average household size was 2.23 and the average family size was 2.86. The median age was 46.9 years.

The median income for a household in the county was $37,091 and the median income for a family was $55,304. Males had a median income of $39,511 versus $21,811 for females. The per capita income for the county was $18,575. About 6.4% of families and 12.9% of the population were below the poverty line, including 11.2% of those under age 18 and 19.2% of those age 65 or over.

== Communities ==
=== Cities ===
- Balta
- Rugby (county seat)
- Wolford

=== Census-designated places ===
- Barton
- Orrin
- Selz

=== Unincorporated communities ===
- Leverich
- Silva
- Tunbridge

=== Townships ===
- Alexanter
- Antelope Lake
- Balta
- Elling
- Elverum
- Hagel
- Jefferson
- Meyer
- Ness
- Reno Valley
- Rush Lake
- Torgerson
- Truman
- Tuscarora
- White

== Politics ==
Pierce County voters have tended to vote Republican for decades. In only one national election since 1964 has the county selected the Democratic Party candidate (as of 2024).

United States presidential election results for Pierce County, North Dakota
Year	Republican		Democratic		Third party(ies)	
Year	No.	%	No.	%	No.	%
1900	535	64.93%	276	33.50%	13	1.58%
1904	921	73.39%	284	22.63%	50	3.98%
1908	884	57.37%	610	39.58%	47	3.05%
1912	264	22.39%	453	38.42%	462	39.19%
1916	703	44.27%	789	49.69%	96	6.05%
1920	2,102	84.59%	294	11.83%	89	3.58%
1924	1,160	46.89%	157	6.35%	1,157	46.77%
1928	1,469	47.60%	1,606	52.04%	11	0.36%
1932	856	25.68%	2,439	73.18%	38	1.14%
1936	912	24.23%	2,168	57.60%	684	18.17%
1940	2,349	61.64%	1,451	38.07%	11	0.29%
1944	1,992	60.07%	1,307	39.41%	17	0.51%
1948	1,738	58.86%	1,147	38.84%	68	2.30%
1952	2,806	77.77%	773	21.42%	29	0.80%
1956	1,997	59.75%	1,340	40.10%	5	0.15%
1960	1,464	44.19%	1,848	55.78%	1	0.03%
1964	1,178	38.33%	1,893	61.60%	2	0.07%
1968	1,700	57.07%	1,048	35.18%	231	7.75%
1972	1,970	66.15%	973	32.67%	35	1.18%
1976	1,396	48.35%	1,434	49.67%	57	1.97%
1980	2,273	76.07%	517	17.30%	198	6.63%
1984	1,883	71.71%	691	26.31%	52	1.98%
1988	1,422	57.41%	1,008	40.69%	47	1.90%
1992	1,099	45.21%	761	31.30%	571	23.49%
1996	1,017	51.52%	671	33.99%	286	14.49%
2000	1,348	68.39%	500	25.37%	123	6.24%
2004	1,475	67.20%	686	31.25%	34	1.55%
2008	1,301	60.82%	792	37.03%	46	2.15%
2012	1,465	67.26%	660	30.30%	53	2.43%
2016	1,437	69.39%	431	20.81%	203	9.80%
2020	1,585	74.48%	497	23.36%	46	2.16%
2024	1,493	75.79%	439	22.28%	38	1.93%

== Education ==
School districts include:

- Anamoose Public School District 14
- Bottineau Public School District 1
- Harvey Public School District 38
- Leeds Public School District 6
- Maddock Public School District 9
- North Star School District 10
- Rugby Public School District 5
- Towner-Granville-Upham Public School District 60

Former districts:

- Wolford Public School District 1 - Closed in 2019

== See also ==
- National Register of Historic Places listings in Pierce County ND
