= Barton, North Dakota =

- Census-designated place & unincorporated community
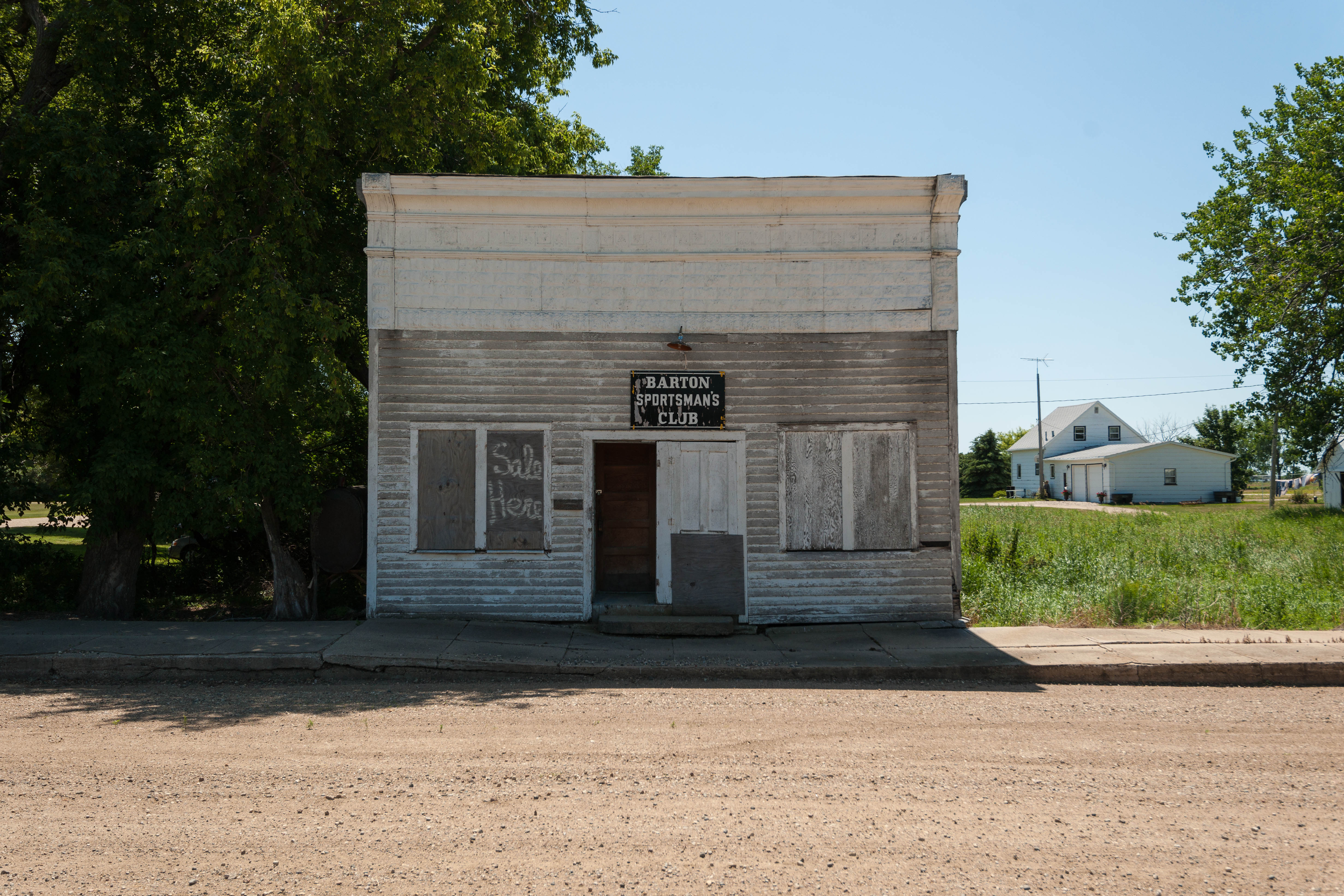
- Barton Sportsman Club

- Location within North Dakota Location within the United States
- Coordinates: 48°30′33″N 100°10′24″W
- Country: United States
- State: North Dakota
- County: Pierce
- Founded: 1887
- Incorporated: 1906
- Disincorporated: 1997

Area
  - Total: 0.44 sq mi (1.13 km^{2})
  - Land: 0.34 sq mi (0.87 km^{2})
  - Water: 0.10 sq mi (0.26 km^{2})
- Elevation: 1,509 ft (460 m)

Population (2020)
  - Total: 13
  - Density: 38.5/sq mi (14.86/km^{2})
- Time zone: UTC-6 (Central (CST))
  - Summer (DST): UTC-5 (CDT)
- ZIP code: 58384
- Area code: 701
- FIPS code: 38-05220
- GNIS feature ID: 2584336

Barton is a census-designated place and unincorporated community in Pierce County, North Dakota, United States. As of the 2020 census, Barton had a population of 13.

== History ==
Barton was founded in 1887 at a junction on the Great Northern Railway. It was originally named Denney but was renamed to Barton on June 13, 1893, by as Postmaster James A. Tyvand. The town was incorporated in 1906 and reached its peak population of 202 in 1910. By 1980, the population had declined to 38, and Barton was officially disincorporated in 1997.

== Geography ==
According to the United States Census Bureau, the CDP has a total area of 0.44 square miles (1.14 km^{2}), of which 0.34 square miles (0.88 km^{2}) is land and 0.1 square miles (0.26 km^{2}) is water.

== Demographics ==
Historical population
Census	Pop.	Note	%±
1910	202		—
1920	158		−21.8%
1930	170		7.6%
1940	157		−7.6%
1950	102		−35.0%
1960	80		−21.6%
1970	34		−57.5%
1980	38		11.8%
1990	24		−36.8%
2010	20		—
2020	13		−35.0%
U.S. Decennial Census

=== 2010 census ===
As of the census of 2010, there were 20 people, 7 households, and 5 families residing in the CDP. The population density was 59.2 inhabitants per square mile (22.9/km^{2}). There were 17 housing units at an average density of 50.3 per square mile (19.4/km^{2}). The racial makeup of the CDP was 100.0% White.

There were 7 households, of which 57.1% had children under the age of 18 living with them, 71.4% were married couples living together, and 28.6% were non-families. 14.3% of all households were made up of individuals, and 14.3% had someone living alone who was 65 years of age or older. The average household size was 2.86 and the average family size was 3.40.

The median age in the CDP was 45.5 years. 35.0% of residents were under the age of 18; 5.0% were between the ages of 18 and 24; 5.0% were from 25 to 44; 40.0% were from 45 to 64; and 15.0% were 65 years of age or older. The gender makeup of the CDP was 65.0% male and 35.0% female.

== Education ==
It is within Rugby Public Schools, which operates Rugby High School.
