= Lignite, North Dakota =

City in North Dakota, United States

Lignite
- City
- Main Street

- Location of Lignite, North Dakota
- Coordinates: 48°52′37″N 102°33′52″W
- Country: United States
- State: North Dakota
- County: Burke
- Founded: 1907

Area
  - Total: 0.15 sq mi (0.40 km^{2})
  - Land: 0.15 sq mi (0.40 km^{2})
  - Water: 0 sq mi (0.00 km^{2})
- Elevation: 1,982 ft (604 m)

Population (2020)
  - Total: 141
  - Estimate (2022): 137
  - Density: 905.0/sq mi (349.44/km^{2})
- Time zone: UTC-6 (Central (CST))
  - Summer (DST): UTC-5 (CDT)
- ZIP code: 58752
- Area code: 701
- FIPS code: 38-46540
- GNIS feature ID: 1036130
- Website: www.lignite-nd.com

Lignite is a city in Burke County, North Dakota, United States. The population was 141 at the 2020 census. Lignite was founded in 1907 and was named for the quantities of lignite, a low-grade coal, present in the area.

== Geography ==
According to the United States Census Bureau, the city has a total area of 0.14 square miles (0.36 km^{2}), all land.

== Demographics ==
Historical population
Census	Pop.	Note	%±
1920	214		—
1930	217		1.4%
1940	235		8.3%
1950	230		−2.1%
1960	355		54.3%
1970	354		−0.3%
1980	332		−6.2%
1990	242		−27.1%
2000	174		−28.1%
2010	155		−10.9%
2020	141		−9.0%
2022 (est.)	137		−2.8%
U.S. Decennial Census; 2020 Census

=== 2010 census ===
As of the census of 2010, there were 155 people, 76 households, and 44 families residing in the city. The population density was 1,107.1 inhabitants per square mile (427.5/km^{2}). There were 96 housing units at an average density of 685.7 per square mile (264.8/km^{2}). The racial makeup of the city was 96.1% White, 2.6% Native American, 0.6% Asian, and 0.6% from two or more races. Hispanic or Latino of any race were 4.5% of the population.

There were 76 households, of which 23.7% had children under the age of 18 living with them, 52.6% were married couples living together, 3.9% had a female householder with no husband present, 1.3% had a male householder with no wife present, and 42.1% were non-families. 36.8% of all households were made up of individuals, and 19.7% had someone living alone who was 65 years of age or older. The average household size was 2.04 and the average family size was 2.66.

The median age in the city was 49.4 years. 18.1% of residents were under the age of 18; 9% were between the ages of 18 and 24; 16.8% were from 25 to 44; 38% were from 45 to 64; and 18.1% were 65 years of age or older. The gender makeup of the city was 52.3% male and 47.7% female.

=== 2000 census ===
As of the census of 2000, there were 174 people, 85 households, and 57 families residing in the city. The population density was 1,244.4 inhabitants per square mile (480.5/km^{2}). There were 111 housing units at an average density of 793.8 per square mile (306.5/km^{2}). The racial makeup of the city was 100.00% White.

There were 85 households, out of which 22.4% had children under the age of 18 living with them, 54.1% were married couples living together, 8.2% had a female householder with no husband present, and 31.8% were non-families. 30.6% of all households were made up of individuals, and 16.5% had someone living alone who was 65 years of age or older. The average household size was 2.05 and the average family size was 2.48.

In the city, the population was spread out, with 17.2% under the age of 18, 4.6% from 18 to 24, 19.5% from 25 to 44, 37.9% from 45 to 64, and 20.7% who were 65 years of age or older. The median age was 48 years. For every 100 females, there were 100.0 males. For every 100 females age 18 and over, there were 94.6 males.

The median income for a household in the city was $20,833, and the median income for a family was $33,750. Males had a median income of $37,917 versus $11,607 for females. The per capita income for the city was $15,346. About 5.6% of families and 11.4% of the population were below the poverty line, including 28.0% of those under the age of eighteen and 19.0% of those 65 or over.

== Economy ==
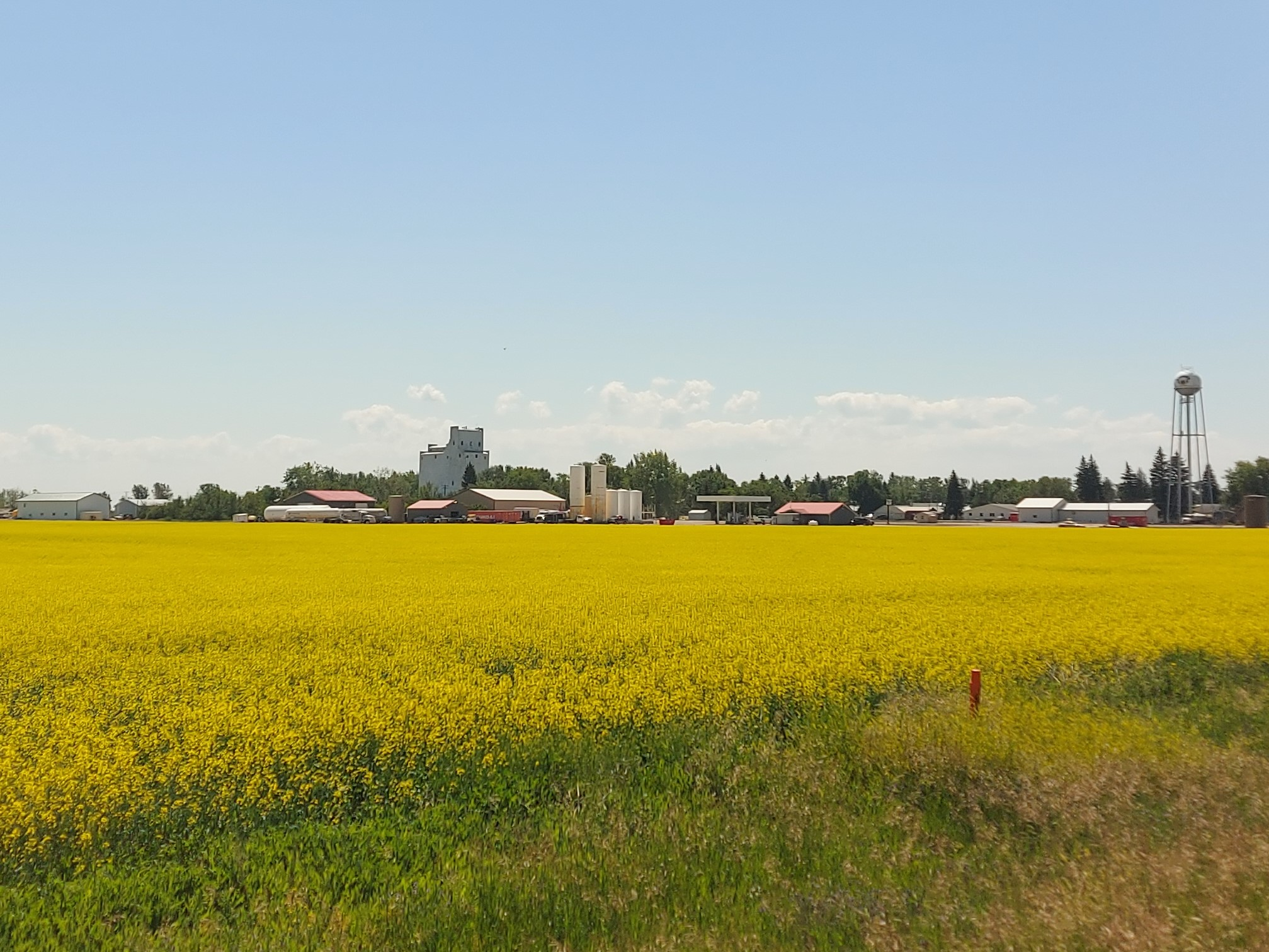
Rapeseed (canola) in bloom near Lignite

Lignite is in the center of farming country. Historically there has been some oil activity in the area, but it is a bit north of the current "Bakken" boom. In 2010, a London-based resources company announced it had gotten the first potash drilling permit in three decades from the state of North Dakota. Sirius Minerals drilled an exploratory potash well near Lignite in November, 2010.
