= Adams, North Dakota =

- City
- Interactive map of Adams, North Dakota
- Location within North Dakota
- Coordinates: 48.4205°N 98.0740°W
- Country: United States
- State: North Dakota
- County: Walsh
- Founded: 1905

Area
  - Total: 0.992 sq mi (2.569 km^{2})
  - Land: 0.975 sq mi (2.526 km^{2})
  - Water: 0.017 sq mi (0.044 km^{2}) 1.71%
- Elevation: 1,568 ft (478 m)

Population (2020)
  - Total: 127
  - Estimate (2025): 121
  - Density: 130/sq mi (50.3/km^{2})
- Time zone: UTC–6 (Central (CST))
  - Summer (DST): UTC–5 (CDT)
- ZIP Code: 58210
- Area code: 701
- FIPS code: 38-00340
- GNIS feature ID: 1035901

Adams is a city in Walsh County, North Dakota, United States. The population was 127 as of the 2020 census, and was estimated at 121 in 2025.

== History ==
Adams was founded in 1905. Adams is twinned with Bulwick, Northamptonshire.

== Geography ==
According to the United States Census Bureau, the city has a total area of 0.992 square miles (2.57 km^{2}), of which 0.975 square miles (2.53 km^{2}) is land and 0.017 square miles (0.044 km^{2}) (1.71%) is water.

== Climate ==
This climatic region is typified by large seasonal temperature differences, with warm to hot (and often humid) summers and cold (sometimes severely cold) winters. According to the Köppen Climate Classification system, Adams has a humid continental climate, abbreviated "Dfb" on climate maps.

== Demographics ==
Historical population
Census	Pop.	Note	%±
1910	338		—
1920	404		19.5%
1930	345		−14.6%
1940	355		2.9%
1950	411		15.8%
1960	360		−12.4%
1970	284		−21.1%
1980	303		6.7%
1990	248		−18.2%
2000	203		−18.1%
2010	127		−37.4%
2020	127		0.0%
2025 (est.)	121		−4.7%
U.S. Decennial Census; 2020 Census

=== 2020 census ===
As of the 2020 census, there were 127 people, 56 households, and 30 families residing in the city.

=== 2010 census ===
As of the census of 2010, there were 127 people, 72 households, and 36 families living in the city. The population density was 127.0 inhabitants per square mile (49.0/km^{2}). There were 98 housing units at an average density of 98.0 per square mile (37.8/km^{2}). The racial makeup of the city was 95.3% White, 3.9% from other races, and 0.8% from two or more races. Hispanic or Latino of any race were 8.7% of the population.

There were 72 households, of which 15.3% had children under the age of 18 living with them, 41.7% were married couples living together, 6.9% had a female householder with no husband present, 1.4% had a male householder with no wife present, and 50.0% were non-families. 45.8% of all households were made up of individuals, and 30.6% had someone living alone who was 65 years of age or older. The average household size was 1.76 and the average family size was 2.42.

The median age in the city was 52.5 years. 11.8% of residents were under the age of 18; 4.6% were between the ages of 18 and 24; 19.6% were from 25 to 44; 36.3% were from 45 to 64; and 27.6% were 65 years of age or older. The gender makeup of the city was 44.9% male and 55.1% female.

=== 2000 census ===
As of the census of 2000, there were 203 people, 87 households, and 60 families living in the city. The population density was 205.3 inhabitants per square mile (79.3/km^{2}). There were 118 housing units at an average density of 119.3 per square mile (46.1/km^{2}). The racial makeup of the city was 94.58% White, 1.97% from other races, and 3.45% from two or more races. Hispanic or Latino of any race were 7.39% of the population.

The top 6 ancestry groups in the city are Norwegian (51.7%), Czech (17.2%), German (17.2%), Swedish (7.4%), Polish (5.4%), Scots-Irish (4.4%).

There were 87 households, out of which 34.5% had children under the age of 18 living with them, 58.6% were married couples living together, 6.9% had a female householder with no husband present, and 29.9% were non-families. 28.7% of all households were made up of individuals, and 14.9% had someone living alone who was 65 years of age or older. The average household size was 2.33 and the average family size was 2.87.

In the city, the population was spread out, with 26.1% under the age of 18, 5.4% from 18 to 24, 22.7% from 25 to 44, 16.7% from 45 to 64, and 29.1% who were 65 years of age or older. The median age was 42 years. For every 100 females, there were 97.1 males. For every 100 females age 18 and over, there were 92.3 males.

The median income for a household in the city was $25,938, and the median income for a family was $30,750. Males had a median income of $29,750 versus $15,833 for females. The per capita income for the city was $14,224. About 12.3% of families and 16.8% of the population were below the poverty line, including 24.0% of those under the age of eighteen and 13.5% of those sixty five or over.

== Notable people ==
- Rudolph Hjalmar Gjelsness, prominent librarian
- Neil LeVang, musician on The Lawrence Welk Show
