= Rocklake, North Dakota =

City in North Dakota, United States

- City
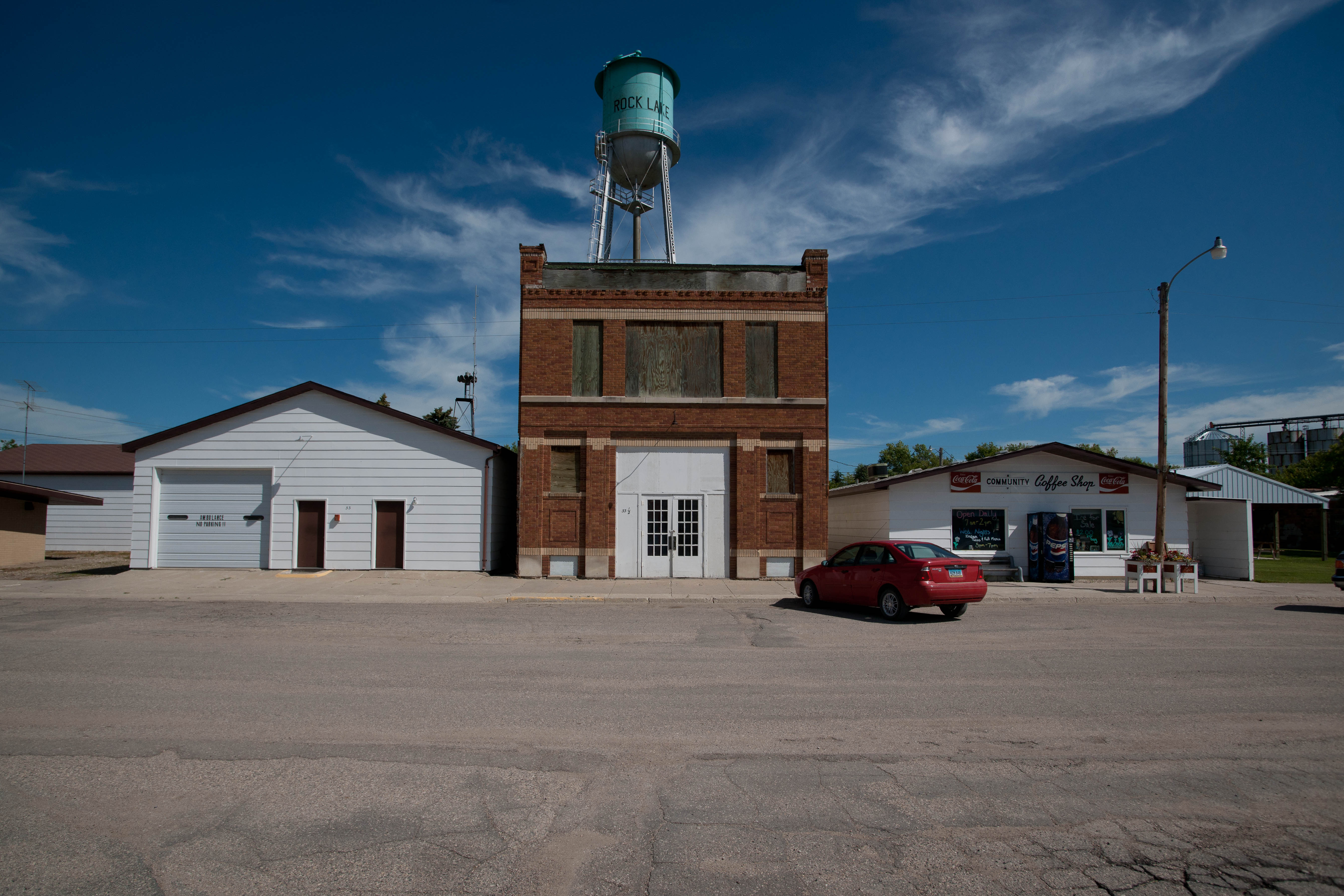
- Business district of Rocklake

- Location of Rocklake, North Dakota
- Coordinates: 48°47′24″N 99°14′45″W
- Country: United States
- State: North Dakota
- County: Towner
- Incorporated: April 28, 1906

Area
  - Total: 0.21 sq mi (0.54 km^{2})
  - Land: 0.21 sq mi (0.54 km^{2})
  - Water: 0 sq mi (0.00 km^{2})
- Elevation: 1,545 ft (471 m)

Population (2020)
  - Total: 94
  - Estimate (2022): 89
  - Density: 449.3/sq mi (173.46/km^{2})
- Time zone: UTC-6 (Central (CST))
  - Summer (DST): UTC-5 (CDT)
- ZIP code: 58365
- Area code: 701
- FIPS code: 38-67500
- GNIS feature ID: 1036241

Rocklake is a city in Towner County, North Dakota, United States. The population was 94 at the 2020 census. The city lies a few miles south of the Canada–United States border, near the junction of U.S. Route 281 and North Dakota State Highway 5.

== Geography ==
According to the United States Census Bureau, the city has a total area of 0.22 square miles (0.57 km^{2}), all land.

== Demographics ==
Historical population
Census	Pop.	Note	%±
1910	194		—
1920	238		22.7%
1930	279		17.2%
1940	348		24.7%
1950	385		10.6%
1960	350		−9.1%
1970	270		−22.9%
1980	287		6.3%
1990	221		−23.0%
2000	194		−12.2%
2010	101		−47.9%
2020	94		−6.9%
2022 (est.)	89		−5.3%
U.S. Decennial Census; 2020 Census

=== 2020 census ===
As of the census of 2020, there were 94 people, 87 households, and 75 families residing in the town.

=== 2010 census ===
As of the census of 2010, there were 101 people, 63 households, and 23 families residing in the town. The population density was 459.1 inhabitants per square mile (177.3/km^{2}). There were 103 housing units at an average density of 468.2 per square mile (180.8/km^{2}). The racial makeup of the city was 95.0% White and 5.0% Native American.

There were 63 households, of which 11.1% had children under the age of 18 living with them, 31.7% were married couples living together, 4.8% had a female householder with no husband present, and 63.5% were non-families. 61.9% of all households were made up of individuals, and 25.4% had someone living alone who was 65 years of age or older. The average household size was 1.60 and the average family size was 2.61.

The median age in the city was 52.3 years. 9.9% of residents were under the age of 18; 7.1% were between the ages of 18 and 24; 22.8% were from 25 to 44; 30.6% were from 45 to 64; and 29.7% were 65 years of age or older. The gender makeup of the city was 54.5% male and 45.5% female.

=== 2000 census ===
As of the census of 2000, there were 194 people, 89 households, and 54 families residing in the city. The population density was 897.4 inhabitants per square mile (346.5/km^{2}). There were 116 housing units at an average density of 536.6 per square mile (207.2/km^{2}). The racial makeup of the city was 95.88% White, 3.61% Native American, and 0.52% from two or more races. 24.5% were of German, 15.7% Finnish, 13.8% Swedish, 10.1% American, 8.8% Irish, 8.2% Norwegian, 5.0% English and 5.0% Scotch-Irish ancestry.

There were 89 households, out of which 27.0% had children under the age of 18 living with them, 49.4% were married couples living together, 9.0% had a female householder with no husband present, and 39.3% were non-families. 39.3% of all households were made up of individuals, and 21.3% had someone living alone who was 65 years of age or older. The average household size was 2.18 and the average family size was 2.91.

In the city, the population was spread out, with 26.3% under the age of 18, 3.1% from 18 to 24, 26.8% from 25 to 44, 14.4% from 45 to 64, and 29.4% who were 65 years of age or older. The median age was 42 years. For every 100 females, there were 92.1 males. For every 100 females age 18 and over, there were 98.6 males.

The median income for a household in the city was $19,886, and the median income for a family was $31,667. Males had a median income of $21,250 versus $17,188 for females. The per capita income for the city was $13,116. About 2.3% of families and 8.9% of the population were below the poverty line, including 9.8% of those under the age of eighteen and none of those 65 or over.
