= Dunseith, North Dakota =

- City
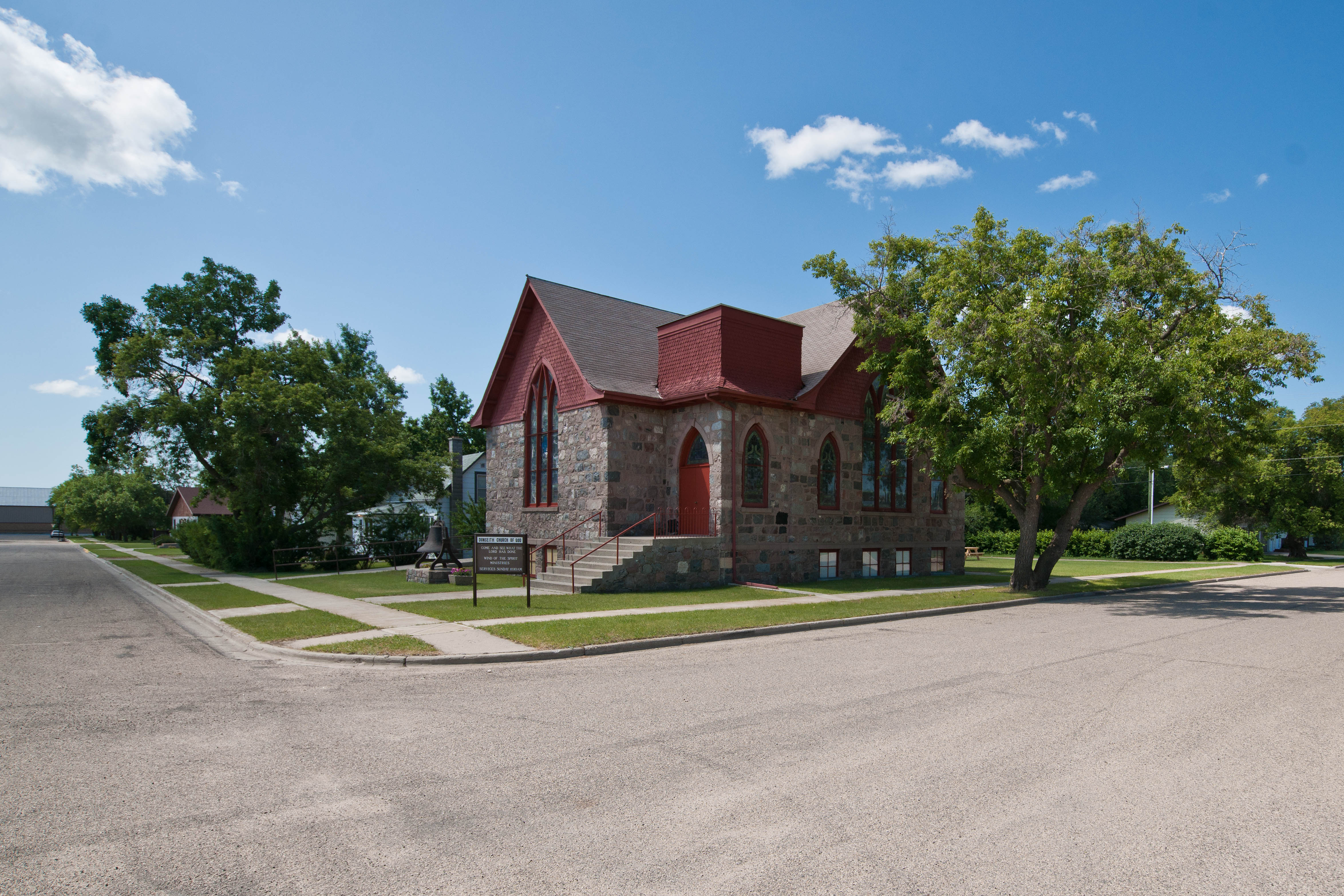
- Motto: "Gateway to the Peace Gardens"
- Location of Dunseith, North Dakota
- Coordinates: 48°48′47″N 100°03′44″W
- Country: United States
- State: North Dakota
- County: Rolette
- Founded: 1882
- Incorporated: 1908
- Named for: Jeannette Dunseith Eaton

Government
  - Mayor: George Gottbreht

Area
  - Total: 1.00 sq mi (2.59 km^{2})
  - Land: 1.00 sq mi (2.59 km^{2})
  - Water: 0 sq mi (0.00 km^{2})
- Elevation: 1,710 ft (520 m)

Population (2020)
  - Total: 632
  - Estimate (2022): 622
  - Density: 630.9/sq mi (243.59/km^{2})
- Time zone: UTC-6 (Central (CST))
  - Summer (DST): UTC-5 (CDT)
- ZIP code: 58329
- Area code: 701
- FIPS code: 38-21020
- GNIS feature ID: 1036000
- Website: dunseithnd.com

Dunseith (/dʌnˈsiːθ/ dun-SEETH) is a city in Rolette County, North Dakota, United States. The population was 632 at the 2020 census. Dunseith is best known for its proximity to the International Peace Garden. The port of entry at the Peace Garden is one of three 24-hour ports in North Dakota (the others being Portal and Pembina). Dunseith is also the home of the world's largest turtle sculpture, the "W'eel Turtle", made of more than 2,000 wheels painted green.

== History ==
Dunseith was platted in 1882. The town was founded by William Dunseith Eaton of Chicago in 1884. A post office has been in operation in Dunseith since 1884. The city was incorporated in 1908.

== Geography ==
According to the United States Census Bureau, the city has a total area of 1.00 square mile (2.59 km^{2}), all land. Dunseith lies just south of the Turtle Mountain plateau.

== Demographics ==
Historical population
Census	Pop.	Note	%±
1910	473		—
1920	374		−20.9%
1930	484		29.4%
1940	719		48.6%
1950	713		−0.8%
1960	1,017		42.6%
1970	811		−20.3%
1980	625		−22.9%
1990	723		15.7%
2000	739		2.2%
2010	773		4.6%
2020	632		−18.2%
2022 (est.)	622		−1.6%
U.S. Decennial Census; 2020 Census

=== 2010 census ===
As of the census of 2010, there were 773 people, 274 households, and 170 families residing in the city. The population density was 773.0 inhabitants per square mile (298.5/km^{2}). There were 299 housing units at an average density of 299.0 per square mile (115.4/km^{2}). The racial makeup of the city was 15.0% White, 0.9% African American, 79.6% Native American, 0.4% from other races, and 4.1% from two or more races. Hispanic or Latino of any race were 2.2% of the population.

There were 274 households, of which 46.4% had children under the age of 18 living with them, 27.4% were married couples living together, 25.2% had a female householder with no husband present, 9.5% had a male householder with no wife present, and 38.0% were non-families. 32.1% of all households were made up of individuals, and 12% had someone living alone who was 65 years of age or older. The average household size was 2.72 and the average family size was 3.41.

The median age in the city was 27.4 years. 35.8% of residents were under the age of 18; 10.2% were between the ages of 18 and 24; 23.7% were from 25 to 44; 18.2% were from 45 to 64; and 12.2% were 65 years of age or older. The gender makeup of the city was 49.2% male and 50.8% female.

=== 2000 census ===
As of the census of 2000, there were 739 people, 253 households, and 178 families residing in the city. The population density was 729.2 inhabitants per square mile (281.5/km^{2}). There were 282 housing units at an average density of 278.2 per square mile (107.4/km^{2}). The racial makeup of the city was 24.76% White, 0.27% African American, 71.04% Native American, 0.14% Asian, 0.14% from other races, and 3.65% from two or more races. Hispanic or Latino of any race were 0.27% of the population.

There were 253 households, out of which 44.3% had children under the age of 18 living with them, 31.6% were married couples living together, 32.4% had a female householder with no husband present, and 29.6% were non-families. 26.5% of all households were made up of individuals, and 9.5% had someone living alone who was 65 years of age or older. The average household size was 2.74 and the average family size was 3.23.

In the city, the population was spread out, with 35.2% under the age of 18, 11.1% from 18 to 24, 23.8% from 25 to 44, 14.5% from 45 to 64, and 15.4% who were 65 years of age or older. The median age was 28 years. For every 100 females, there were 90.5 males. For every 100 females age 18 and over, there were 80.1 males.

The median income for a household in the city was $17,917, and the median income for a family was $19,531. Males had a median income of $21,042 versus $20,250 for females. The per capita income for the city was $9,478. About 40.0% of families and 36.5% of the population were below the poverty line, including 48.7% of those under age 18 and 24.6% of those age 65 or over.

== Climate ==
This climatic region is typified by large seasonal temperature differences, with warm to hot (and often humid) summers and cold (sometimes severely cold) winters. According to the Köppen Climate Classification system, Dunseith has a humid continental climate, abbreviated "Dfb" on climate maps.
