= List of U.S. Highways in North Dakota =

- Sample highway markers

- Map of North Dakota highway system

Highway names
- Interstates: Interstate X (I-X)
- US Highways: U.S. Route X (US X)
- State: N.D. Highway X (ND X)

System links
- North Dakota State Highway System; Interstate; US; State

The U.S. Highways in North Dakota are the segments of the United States Numbered Highway System owned and maintained by the North Dakota Department of Transportation (NDDOT) in the US state of North Dakota.

== Mainline highways ==
Number	Length (mi)	Length (km)	Southern or western terminus	Northern or eastern terminus	Formed	Removed	Notes
US 2	358.090	576.290	US 2 near Williston	US 2 in Grand Forks	1926	current	
US 2N	—	—	Arvilla	Grand Forks	c. 1926	c. 1939	1931 Rand McNally Atlas showed US 2 having north and south branches between Arvilla and Grand Forks. US 2N was along the present US 2 alignment.
US 2S	—	—	Arvilla	Grand Forks	c. 1926	c. 1939	1931 Rand McNally Atlas showed US 2 having north and south branches between Arvilla and Grand Forks. US 2S is along current Grand Forks CR 4, a mile south of the present US 2 alignment.
US 10	8.043	12.944	I-94 / I-94 Bus. / US 52 at West Fargo	US 10 in Moorhead	c. 1938	current	
US 12	87.470	140.769	US 12 near Haynes	US 12 near Haynes	1926	current	Yellowstone Trail
US 52	362.031	582.632	Hwy 39 near Portal	US 52 near Fargo	1935	current	
US 59	—	—	Pembina	Minnesota border east of Pembina	1935	c. 1955	Realigned 1950-1955 to run via Lancaster, Minnesota. Now replaced by ND 59
US 81	242.460	390.202	US 81 south of Hankinson	PTH 75 at Pembina	1926	current	
US 83	265.980	428.053	US 83 south of Hague	PTH 83 north of Westhope	1926	current	Veterans of Foreign Wars Memorial Highway
US 85	255.063	410.484	US 85 south of Hague	Hwy 35 north of Fortuna	1926	current	Theodore Roosevelt Expressway, CanAm Highway
US 281	267.190	430.001	US 281 south of Ellendale	Hansboro–Cartwright Border Crossing north of Hansboro	1931	current	American Legion Memorial Highway
US 281S	—	—	Oberon, North Dakota	Lallie, North Dakota	1939	1940	
Former

== Special routes ==
Number	Length (mi)	Length (km)	Southern or western terminus	Northern or eastern terminus	Formed	Removed	Notes
US 2 Bus.	—	—	—	—	—	—	Serves Williston
US 2 Byp.	—	—	—	—	—	—	Served Minot
US 2 Bus.	—	—	—	—	—	—	Serves Minot
US 2 Bus.	—	—	—	—	—	—	Serves Grand Forks
US 52 Bus.	—	—	—	—	—	—	Serves Minot
US 52 Bus.	—	—	—	—	—	—	Serves Harvey
US 52 Truck	—	—	—	—	—	—	Serves Jamestown, Bud Murphy Memorial Highway
US 81 Bus.	—	—	—	—	—	—	Serves Fargo
US 81 Bus.	—	—	—	—	—	—	Serves Grand Forks
US 83 Bus.	—	—	—	—	—	—	Serves Minot
US 83 Byp.	—	—	—	—	—	—	Serves Minot
US 85 Bus.	—	—	—	—	—	—	Served Williston
US 85B	9	14	ND 1804 in Williston	US 2 / US 85 in Williston	2015	current	Temporary auxiliary route.
US 281 Truck	—	—	—	—	—	—	Serves Jamestown, Bud Murphy Memorial Highway
Former
