= North Dakota Department of Transportation =

Government agency in North Dakota, United States

Agency overview
- Jurisdiction: North Dakota
- Headquarters: 608 East Boulevard Avenue, Bismarck, North Dakota
- Agency executive: Ronald J. Henke, Director
- Parent agency: State of North Dakota
- Website: dot.nd.gov

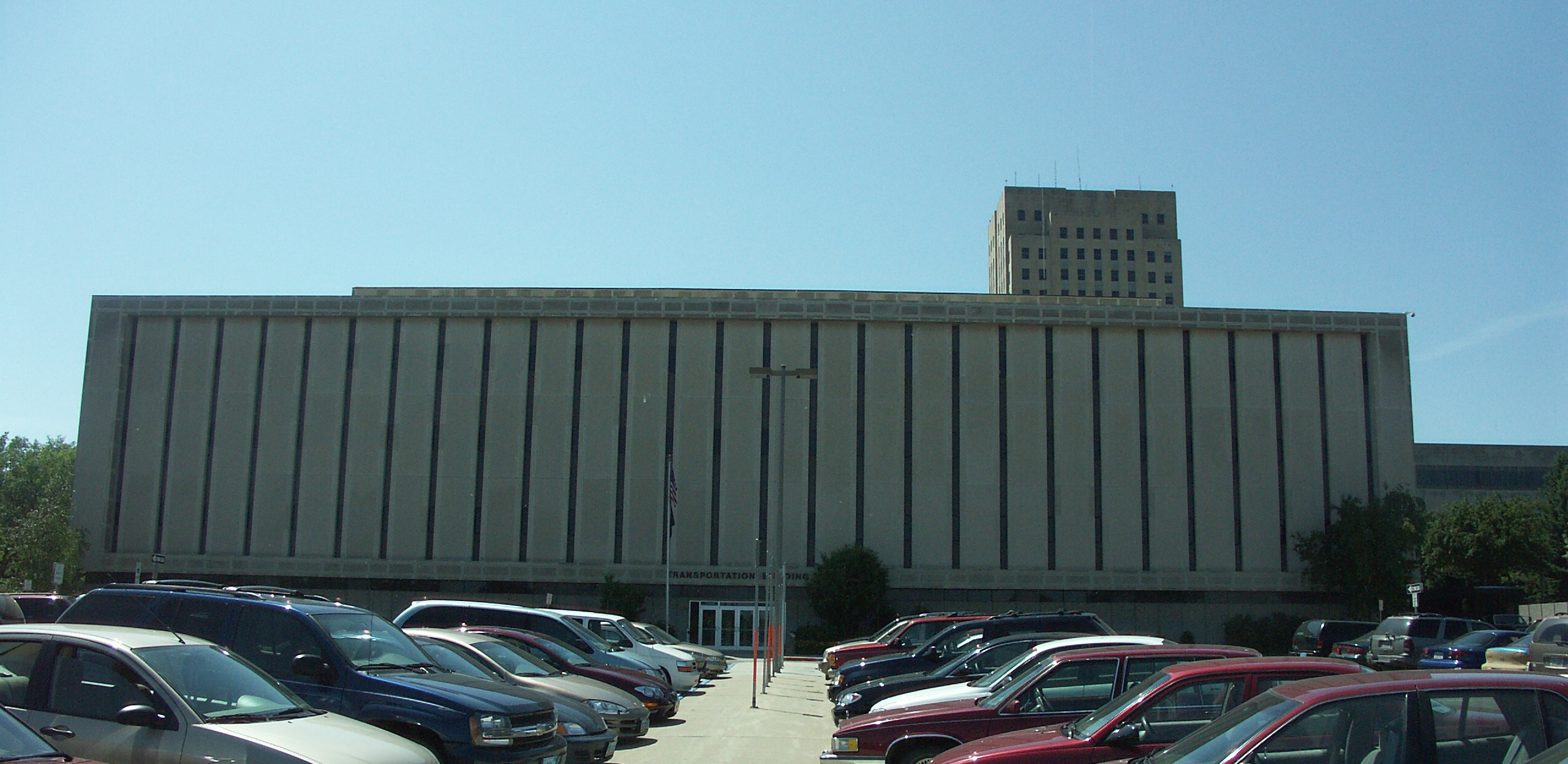
The North Dakota Department of Transportation building in Bismarck

The North Dakota Department of Transportation (NDDOT) is a part of the government of the U.S. state of North Dakota. NDDOT oversees the state's transportation system. This includes planning both new construction and reconstruction projects on roads and highways throughout the state. NDDOT is also responsible for the issuance of state driver's licenses.

North Dakota, in part due to its small population, has the distinction of having a transportation system that has more miles of road per capita than any other state in the United States. North Dakota has the second smallest Department of Transportation within the country (second only to Hawaii). Despite the small size of the Department, North Dakota has more registered vehicles than there are residents of the state.

The Director is Ronald J. Henke, and the central office is located on the North Dakota State Capitol grounds in Bismarck, North Dakota. Until the 1990s, the agency was known as the North Dakota Highway Department.
