= North Dakota Highway 200 Alternate =

State highway in central North Dakota, U.S.

State Route 200 Alternate

Route information
- Auxiliary route of ND 200
- Maintained by NDDOT
- Length: 36.383 mi (58.553 km)

Major junctions
- West end: ND 200 east of Hazen
- US 83 in Washburn
- East end: ND 200 east of Underwood

Location
- Country: United States
- State: North Dakota
- Counties: McLean, Mercer, Oliver

Highway system
- North Dakota State Highway System; Interstate; US; State
← ND 200	→ ND 210

North Dakota Highway 200 Alternate (Alt. ND 200) is a 36.383-mile-long (58.553 km) east–west state highway in the U.S. state of North Dakota. Alt. ND 200's western terminus is at ND 200 east of Hazen, and the eastern terminus is at ND 200 east of Underwood.

== Major intersections ==
County	Location	mi	km	Destinations	Notes
Mercer		0.000	0.000	ND 200 – Hazen, Beulah, Garrison Dam	Western terminus
Mercer		2.991	4.814	ND 31 south – Hannover	Western end of ND 31 concurrency
Mercer		4.857	7.817	ND 31 north – Stanton	Eastern end of ND 31 concurrency, access to Knife River Indian Villages
Mercer–Oliver county line		11.062	17.803	ND 48 south – Center	Northern terminus of ND 48
McLean	Washburn	25.654	41.286	US 83 – Bismarck, Minot	
McLean		36.383	58.553	ND 200 – Turtle Lake, Mercer, Underwood	Eastern terminus
1.000 mi = 1.609 km; 1.000 km = 0.621 mi: Concurrency terminus
