= North Dakota Highway 48 =

State highway in North Dakota, U.S.

North Dakota Highway 48

Route information
- Maintained by NDDOT
- Existed: c. 1975–present

Southern segment
- Length: 9.261 mi (14.904 km)
- South end: ND 25 in Center
- North end: ND 200A west of Fort Clark

Northern segment
- Length: 2.906 mi (4.677 km)
- South end: ND 200 east of Riverdale
- North end: US 83 in Coleharbor

Location
- Country: United States
- State: North Dakota
- Counties: Oliver, McLean, Mercer

Highway system
- North Dakota State Highway System; Interstate; US; State
| ← ND 46 | → ND 49 |

North Dakota Highway 48 (ND 48) is a north–south state highway in the U.S. state of North Dakota. The southern segments southern terminus is at ND 25 in Center, and the northern terminus is at ND 200 west of Fort Clark. The northern segments southern terminus is at ND 200 east of Riverdale, and the northern terminus is at U.S. Route 83 (US 83) in Coleharbor.

== Major intersections ==
| County | Location | mi | km | Destinations | Notes |
|---|---|---|---|---|---|
| Oliver | Center | 0.000 | 0.000 | ND 25 – Hannover, Mandan | Beginning of southern section |
| Oliver–Mercer county line | | 9.261 | 14.904 | ND 200A / Lewis and Clark Trail – Stanton, Washburn | End of southern section |
Gap in route
| McLean | | 0.000 | 0.000 | ND 200 / Lewis and Clark Trail – Riverdale, Pick City | Beginning of northern section |
| McLean | Coleharbor | 2.906 | 4.677 | US 83 / Lewis and Clark Trail – Minot, Underwood | End of northern section |
1.000 mi = 1.609 km; 1.000 km = 0.621 mi
