= Mercer County Regional Airport =

- IATA: none; ICAO: KHZE; FAA LID: HZE

Summary
- Airport type: Public
- Owner: Mercer County Regional Airport Authority
- Serves: Hazen, North Dakota
- Elevation AMSL: 1,814 ft / 553 m
- Coordinates: 47°17′24″N 101°34′52″W
- Website: www.mcraa.com

Map
- Location of airport in North Dakota HZE (the United States)

Runways
| Direction | Length | | Surface |
| Direction | ft | m | Surface |
|---|---|---|---|
| 15/33 | 4,999 | 1,524 | Asphalt |

Statistics (2011)
- Aircraft operations: 930
- Based aircraft: 6
- Source: Federal Aviation Administration

Mercer County Regional Airport (ICAO: KHZE, FAA LID: HZE) is a public use airport in Mercer County, North Dakota, United States. It is located two nautical miles (4 km) east of the central business district of Hazen, North Dakota. The airport is owned by Mercer County and the cities of Hazen, Golden Valley, Pick City, Stanton and Zap. It is included in the National Plan of Integrated Airport Systems for 2011–2015, which categorized it as a general aviation facility.

Although many U.S. airports use the same three-letter location identifier for the FAA and IATA, this airport is assigned HZE by the FAA, but has no designation from the IATA.

== Facilities and aircraft ==
Mercer County Regional Airport covers an area of 200 acres (81 ha) at an elevation of 1,814 feet (553 m) above mean sea level. It has one runway designated 14/32 with an asphalt surface measuring 4,999 by 75 feet (1,524 x 23 m).

For the 12-month period ending July 8, 2011, the airport had 930 aircraft operations, an average of 77 per month: 75% general aviation, 22% air taxi, and 3% military. At that time there were 6 aircraft based at this airport: 83% single-engine and 17% ultralight.

== See also ==
- List of airports in North Dakota
