= North Dakota Highway 31 =

State highway in North Dakota, U.S.

North Dakota Highway 31

Route information
- Maintained by NDDOT

Southern segment
- Length: 35.257 mi (56.741 km)
- South end: SD 65 at the South Dakota border in McIntosh, SD
- North end: ND 21 west of Flasher

Northern segment
- Length: 33.938 mi (54.618 km)
- South end: I-94 north of New Salem
- North end: CR 37 in Stanton

Location
- Country: United States
- State: North Dakota
- Counties: Sioux, Morton, Grant, Oliver, Mercer

Highway system
- North Dakota State Highway System; Interstate; US; State
← ND 30	→ ND 32

North Dakota Highway 31 (ND 31) is a north–south state highway in the U.S. state of North Dakota. The southern segments southern terminus is a continuation as South Dakota Highway 65 (SD 65) at the South Dakota border, and the northern terminus is at ND 21 west of Flasher. The northern segments southern terminus is at Interstate 94 (I-94) north of New Salem and the northern terminus is a continuation as County Route 37 (CR 37) at the end of state maintenance in Stanton.

The portion of ND 31 in Sioux County, in the Standing Rock Sioux Reservation, divides the Mountain Time Zone to the west and the Central Time Zone to the east.

== Route description ==
=== Southern segment ===
ND 31 runs from the South Dakota state line where SD 65 ends and continues the entire 35.3 miles of the southern segment without any major intersections south of ND 21. However, ND 31 passes east of St Gertrude and Raleigh along the rural course outside of the Standing Rock Sioux Reservation.

=== Northern segment ===
ND 31 resumes at I-94 north of New Salem and continues north for 17.5 miles before intersecting ND 25's western terminus in Hannover. 13 miles north, ND 31 joins a nearly two mile long concurrency with ND 200A before ending more than a mile later at CR 37 in the city of Stanton. The section north of ND 200A carries a part of the Lewis and Clark Trail, due to the close proximity to the nearby Missouri River.

== Major intersections ==
County	Location	mi	km	Destinations	Notes
Sioux		0.000	0.000	SD 65 – McIntosh	Beginning of southern section
Grant–Morton county line		35.257	56.741	ND 21 – Carson, Flasher	End of southern section
Gap in route
Morton	New Salem	0.000	0.000	I-94 – Bismarck, Billings	Beginning of northern section, I-94 exit 127
Oliver	Hannover	17.389	27.985	ND 25 east – Center	Western terminus of ND 25
Mercer		30.393	48.913	ND 200A west – Hazen, Beulah	Southern end of ND 200A concurrency
Mercer		32.260	51.917	ND 200A east – Washburn	Northern end of ND 200A concurrency
Mercer	Stanton	33.938	54.618	CR 37	End of northern section
1.000 mi = 1.609 km; 1.000 km = 0.621 mi: Concurrency terminus
