= List of North Dakota Wildlife Management Areas =

North Dakota Wildlife Management Areas are protected areas in the US state of North Dakota.

== List of WMAs ==
There are 200 Wildlife Management Areas in North Dakota covering around 220,000 acres (89,000 ha)

- Adam and Teresa Raab: 1,116 acres, Stark County
- Alkali Creek: 595 acres, Bowman County
- Antelope Creek: 890 acres, McKenzie County
- Apple Creek Bottoms: 1,081 acres, Burleigh County
- Arena: 797 acres, Burleigh County
- Armourdale Lake: 24 acres, Towner County
- Arroda Lake: 410 acres, Oliver County
- Art Brazda: 919 acres, Burleigh County
- Audubon: 10,776 acres, McLean County
- Badger Bay: 212 acres, Emmons County
- Balta Dam: 105 acres, Pierce County
- Beaver Creek: 742 acres, Emmons County
- Beaver Creek: 285 acres, Mercer County
- Big Oxbow: 972 acres, McKenzie County
- Black Lake: 174 acres, Bottineau County
- Blacktail Dam: 47 acres, Williams County
- Blue Lake: 15 acres, McLean County
- Blue Ridge WMA: 254 acres, Divide County
- Buffalo Lake: 876 acres, Pierce County
- Bull Creek: 154 acres, Billings County
- Bunker Lake: 156 acres, Burleigh County
- Camels Hump Lake: 127 acres, Golden Valley County
- C.C. Underwood: 321 acres, Towner County
- Cedar Lake: 805 acres, Slope County
- Charles Schroeder: 441 acres, McLean County
- Coal Lake: 795 acres, McLean County
- Cottonwood Slough: 159 acres, Sheridan County
- Crown Butte Dam: 88 acres, Morton County
- Custer Mine: 692 acres, McLean County
- Deepwater Creek: 2,463 acres, McLean County
- de Trobriand: 2,644 acres, McLean County
- Dog Town: 36 acres, Adams County
- Douglas Creek: 2,813 acres, McLean County
- Egg Lake: 11 acres, Wells County
- Fish Creek Dam: 186 acres, Morton County
- Forward: 29 acres, Wells County
- Foxholm: 40 acres, Ward County
- Frettim Township: 86 acres, Kidder County
- Froelich Dam: 297 acres, Sioux County
- George Karpen: 474 acres, Foster County
- Golden Valley: 160 acres, Mercer County
- Graner Bottoms: 3,645 acres, Morton County.
- Hague: 162 acres, Emmons County
- Harmony Lake: 635 acres, Mercer County
- Harris M. Baukol: 1,271 acres, Divide County
- Harvey Dam: 431 acres, Wells County
- Haven Hills: 590 acres, Kidder County
- Heffner Lake: 272 acres, McHenry County
- Heimdal: 40 acres, Wells County
- Hoornaert: 249 acres, Wells County
- Hille: 3,083 acres, Mercer County
- Hofflund WMA: 1,500 acres, Williams County
- Horseshoe Lake: 644 acres, Pierce County
- Indian Creek: 1,170 acres, Hettinger County
- Jay Sandstrom McDonald: 273 acres, Wells County
- Kenner Marsh: 639 acres, Ramsey County
- Kerr Slough: 94 acres, Williams County
- Killdeer Mountains: 6,995 acres, Dunn County
- Kimball Bottoms: 2,877 acres, Burleigh County, On the Missouri River South of Bismarck
- Knox Slough: 819 acres, Benson County
- Lake Legreid: 202 acres, Benson County
- Lake Patricia: 642 acres, Morton County
- Leaf Mountain: 162 acres, Burke County
- Lewis and Clark: 122 acres, Oliver County
- Lewis and Clark: 12,152 acres, McKenzie County
- Lincoln Valley East: 158 acres, Sheridan County
- Little Heart Bottoms: 666 acres, Morton County
- Lonetree: 32,345 acres (13,090 ha), Sheridan and Counties.
- Lost Bridge: 465 acres, Dunn County
- MacLean Bottoms: 6,927 acres, Burleigh County
- Manfred: 33 acres, Wells County
- McClusky: 190 acres, Sheridan County
- McGregor Dam: 194 acres, Williams County
- McKenzie Slough: 736 acres, Burleigh County
- Mike J. Hurkes: 30 acres, Emmons County
- Minnewaukan: 159 acres, Benson County
- Missouri Breaks: 477 acres, Mercer County
- Moffit: 160 acres, Burleigh County
- Morton County: 638 acres, Morton County
- Nesvig: 180 acres, Benson County
- Neu’s Point: 510 acres, McKenzie County
- Nickelson: 163 acres, Bottineau County
- Norman and Lucille Schaefer: 313 acres, Mercer County
- North Beulah Mine: 1,861 acres, Mercer County
- Och’s Point: 971 acres, McKenzie County
- Old John’s Lake: 945 acres, Sheridan County
- Otter Creek: 318 acres, Grant County
- Overlook: 29 acres, McKenzie County
- Painted Woods: 1,011 acres, McLean County
- Palermo: 39 acres, Mountrail County
- Pelican Township: 72 acres, Ramsey County
- Phoenix Township: 79 acres, Burleigh County
- Rabb Lake: 19 acres, Rolette County
- Rice Lake: 1,010 acres, Burleigh County
- Riverdale: 3,076 acres, McLean County
- Robert W. Henderson: 575 acres, Burleigh County
- Rolling Hills 982 acres, Sheridan County
- Round Lake Township: 159 acres, McHenry County
- Russ Stuart: 758 acres, Burleigh County
- Salt Flats: 321 acres, Divide County
- Sand Hill: 621 acres, McHenry County
- School Section Lake: 255 acres, Rolette County
- Schotzko: 320 acres, Adams County
- Schmidt Bottoms: 1,318 acres, Morton County
- Schuster: 80 acres, Bottineau County
- Schwartz: 160 acres, Wells County
- Sheyenne: 40 acres, Eddy County
- Short Creek: 164 acres, Burke County
- Smishek Lake: 202 acres, Burke County
- Smith Grove: 233 acres, Oliver County
- Speck Davis Pond: 159 acres, Slope County
- Spring Creek: 449 acres, Bowman County
- Sprynczynatyk: 480 acres, Sheridan County
- Square Butte: 38 acres, Oliver County
- Storm Creek: 472 acres, Morton County
- Sullivan: 265 acres, McKenzie County
- Sweet Briar Lake: 927 acres, Morton County
- Thompson Lake: 872 acres, Bottineau County
- Three Buttes: 162 acres, Grant County
- Tobacco Garden: 341 acres, McKenzie County
- Tree Belt: 128 acres, Wells County
- Trenton: 6,636 acres, Williams County
- Turtle Mountain: 438 acres, Bottineau County
- Turtle Mountain Forest: 159 acres, Bottineau County
- Tuttle: 81 acres, Kidder County
- Tweden: 239 acres, McKenzie County
- Upham: 80 acres, McHenry County
- Van Hook: 4,859 acres, Mountrail County
- V.V. Bull: 199 acres, Bottineau County
- Wakopa: 7,173 acres, Rolette County
- Wall-Redfield: Approximately 5,000 acres (2,000 ha) Bottineau County
- Warsing Dam: 86 acres, Eddy County
- Wells County: 645 acres, Wells County
- White Earth Valley: 276 acres, Mountrail County
- Wilbur J. Boldt: 161 acres, Oliver County
- Willow Lake: 602 acres, Rolette County
- Wilton Mine 307 acres, Burleigh County
- Wolf Creek: 5,127 acres, McLean County
