= North Dakota Highway 25 =

State highway in North Dakota, US

North Dakota Highway 25

Route information
- Maintained by NDDOT
- Length: 34.758 mi (55.938 km)
- Existed: 1926–present

Major junctions
- South end: I-94 / I-94 BL west of Mandan
- North end: ND 31 in Hannover

Location
- Country: United States
- State: North Dakota
- Counties: Morton, Oliver

Highway system
- North Dakota State Highway System; Interstate; US; State
← ND 24	→ ND 26

North Dakota Highway 25 (ND 25) is a 34.758-mile-long (55.938 km) north–south state highway in the U.S. state of North Dakota. ND 25's southern terminus is at Interstate 94 (I-94) and I-94 Business west of Mandan, and the northern terminus is at ND 31 in Hannover.

== Major intersections ==
County	Location	mi	km	Destinations	Notes
Morton		0.000	0.000	I-94 / I-94 BL east to ND 6 – Mandan, Bismarck, Billings	Southern terminus; western terminus of I-94 Bus., I-94 exit 147
Oliver	Center	28.658	46.121	ND 48 north	Southern terminus of ND 48
Oliver	Hannover	34.758	55.938	ND 31 – Hazen, New Salem	Northern terminus
1.000 mi = 1.609 km; 1.000 km = 0.621 mi
