= Fort Berthold, Mercer County, North Dakota =

Fort Berthold, North Dakota
- Unorganized territory
- Location within North Dakota
- Coordinates: 47°27′36″N 102°05′26″W
- Country: United States
- State: North Dakota
- County: Mercer

Area
  - Total: 85.43 sq mi (221.3 km^{2})
  - Land: 57.11 sq mi (147.9 km^{2})
  - Water: 28.31 sq mi (73.3 km^{2})
- Elevation: 2,103 ft (641 m)

Population (2020)
  - Total: 85
  - Density: 1.5/sq mi (0.57/km^{2})
- Time zone: UTC-6 (Central (CST))
  - Summer (DST): UTC-5 (CDT)
- Area code: 701
- FIPS code: 38-27336
- GNIS feature ID: 2393282

Fort Berthold is an unorganized territory in Mercer County, North Dakota, United States. The population was 85 at the 2020 census.
