= Halliday Public School District =

School district in North Dakota, United States

Address
- 188 4th Street South Halliday, North Dakota, 58636; United States

District information
- Type: Public
- Grades: K–6
- NCES District ID: 3808610

Halliday Public School District 19 was a school district headquartered in Halliday, North Dakota.

The former district was mostly in Dunn County, and had a small section in Mercer County.

== History ==
The Halliday Public School District experienced a steady decline in enrollment during the late 20th and early 21st centuries, decreasing from 79 students in 1999 to 34 in 2008. By 2009, enrollment had fallen to approximately 15 students, raising concerns about the district’s long-term viability and prompting discussions of consolidation with neighboring districts.

As enrollment continued to fall, the district gradually reduced operations. Halliday High School closed in 2013, followed by the elementary school in 2022.

In response to declining enrollment and financial pressures, the district began scaling back operations. Halliday High School closed in 2013, while the district continued to operate an elementary program for several more years. The elementary school ultimately closed in 2022, after which students were served by the Killdeer Public School District. The district was formally dissolved on June 30, 2023.

== Academic performance ==
In 2003 the superintendent, Merlin Dahl, stated that students were performing above the North Dakota average and/or had satisfactory performance, citing test scores generated close to that year.

== Athletics ==
In 2002 the district had common athletic teams with Dodge and Golden Valley, but by then was trying to cancel these agreements to prepare for a merger with Killdeer.
