= Fort Clark Trading Post State Historic Site =

State historic site of North Dakota, United States

- Fort Clark Archeological District
- U.S. National Register of Historic Places
- U.S. Historic district
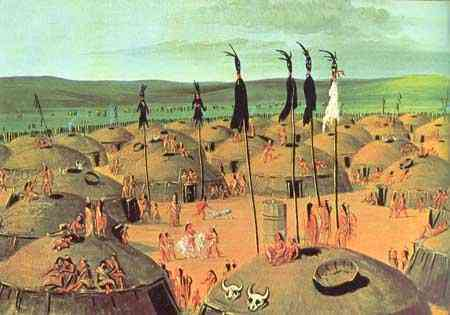
- A typical Mandan village — possibly what the early settlement may have looked like

- Location within North Dakota Location within the United States
- Location: Mercer County, North Dakota, USA
- Nearest city: Stanton, North Dakota
- Coordinates: 47°15′07″N 101°16′31″W
- NRHP reference No.: 86002800
- Added to NRHP: October 19, 1986

Fort Clark Trading Post State Historic Site was once the home to a Mandan and later an Arikara settlement. Over the course of its history it also had two factories (trading posts). Today only archeological remains survive at the site located eight miles west of Washburn, North Dakota, United States.

== History ==
In 1822, the Mandan tribe built a settlement with earth-covered lodges on the bluffs of the Missouri River. In 1830, a representative of the American Fur Company named James Kipp built Fort Clark Trading Post south of the village. The first steamboat to journey up the upper-Missouri River was the Yellowstone which arrived in 1832 carrying 1,500 gallons of goods and liquor. George Catlin visited in 1832, and Karl Bodmer and Prince Maximilian of Wied-Neuwied stayed the winter of 1833-1834. In 1837, the steamboat St. Peters docked at the village carrying passengers infected with smallpox, and sparking the 1837 Great Plains smallpox epidemic. As the disease swept through the village, it wiped out approximately ninety percent of the inhabitants. In 1838, the nearby Arikara tribe moved into the abandoned village. In 1850, another trading post was built by Charles Primeau. In 1851, a cholera outbreak occurred and then a smallpox outbreak in 1856. When an attack by the Dakota happened in 1861, the fort was permanently abandoned.

== Historic site ==
Most of the site has been owned by the state since 1889. A total of 125 acres (51 ha) in two sections of the state historic site were listed on the National Register of Historic Places in 1986 as Fort Clark Archeological District.

More than 2,200 features on the surface from the ruins of houses and graves still exist. Lodge depressions are also visible along with an unmarked cemetery with more than 800 graves. The site is operated by the North Dakota State Historical Society.

== See also ==
- Knife River Indian Villages National Historic Site
