= 1948 United States presidential election in North Dakota =

- November 2, 1948

All 4 North Dakota votes to the Electoral College
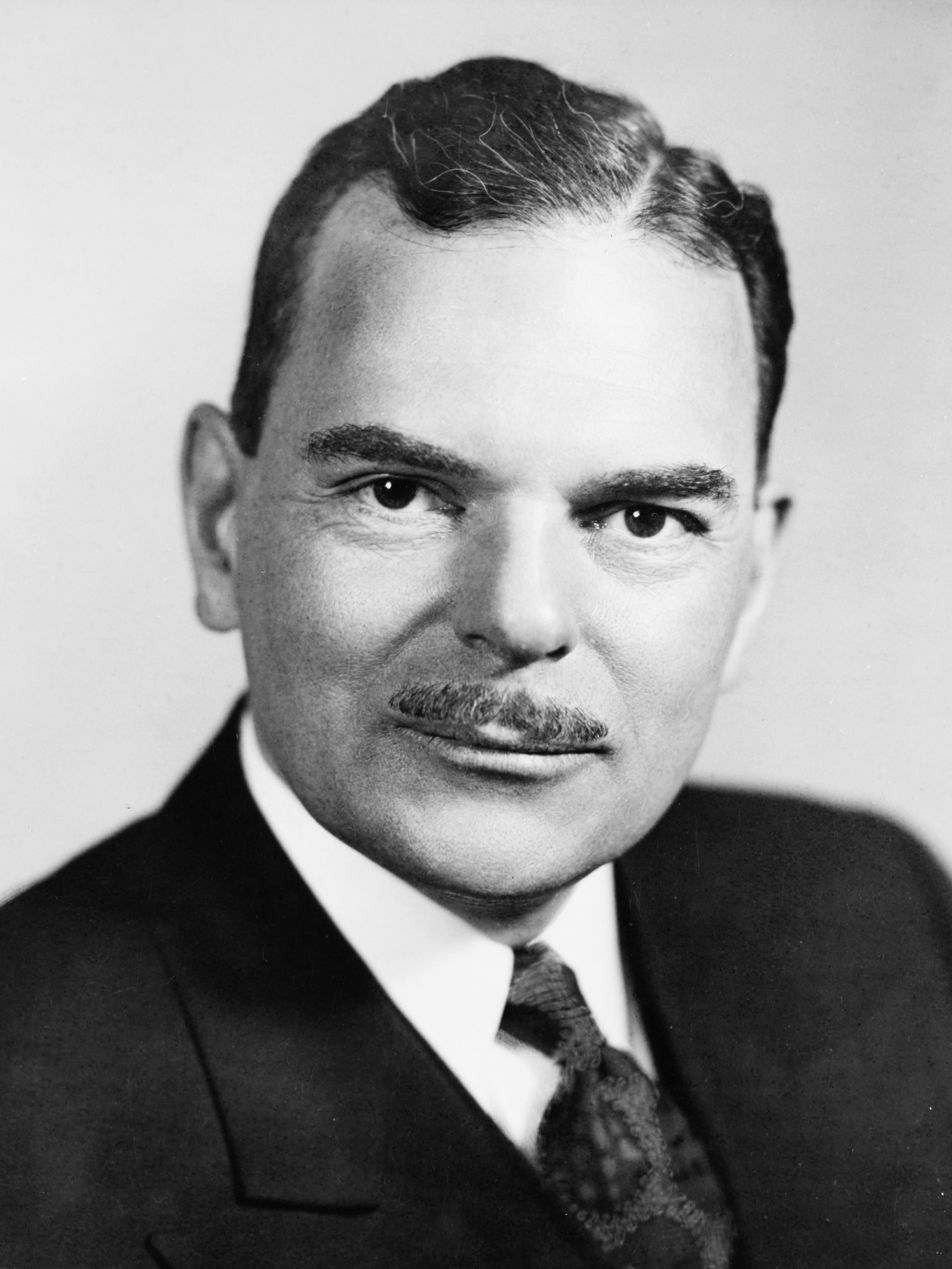

Nominee	Thomas E. Dewey	Harry S. Truman
Party	Republican	Democratic
Home state	New York	Missouri
Running mate	Earl Warren	Alben W. Barkley
Electoral vote	4	0
Popular vote	115,139	95,812
Percentage	52.17%	43.41%
County results
Dewey
40–50%
50–60%
60–70%
70–80%
Truman
40–50%
50–60%
President before election
Harry S. Truman
Democratic
Elected President
Harry S. Truman
Democratic

The 1948 United States presidential election in North Dakota took place on November 2, 1948, as part of the 1948 United States presidential election. Voters chose four representatives, or electors, to the Electoral College, who voted for president and vice president.

North Dakota was won by Governor Thomas E. Dewey (R–New York), running with Governor Earl Warren, with 52.17% of the popular vote, against incumbent President Harry S. Truman (D–Missouri), running with Kentucky Senator Alben W. Barkley, with 43.41% of the popular vote. North Dakota was the only state outside of the south in which Strom Thurmond was on the ballot, although he only received 0.17% of the vote.

== Campaign ==
On May 11, 1948, the North Dakota Democratic Party voted unanimously to instruct its delegation to the Democratic National Convention to support Truman for president.

== Results ==
1948 United States presidential election in North Dakota
Party	Candidate	Votes	%
Republican	Thomas E. Dewey	115,139	52.17%
Democratic	Harry S. Truman (inc.)	95,812	43.41%
Progressive	Henry A. Wallace	8,391	3.80%
Socialist	Norman Thomas	1,000	0.45%
Dixiecrat	Strom Thurmond	374	0.17%
Total votes		220,716	100%

=== Results by county ===
County	Thomas E. Dewey Republican		Harry S. Truman Democratic		Henry A. Wallace Progressive		Norman Thomas Socialist		Strom Thurmond States’ Rights		Margin		Total votes cast
County	#	%	#	%	#	%	#	%	#	%	#	%	Total votes cast
Adams	908	51.01%	753	42.30%	103	5.79%	13	0.73%	3	0.17%	155	8.71%	1,780
Barnes	3,385	51.33%	2,892	43.86%	279	4.23%	27	0.41%	11	0.17%	493	7.48%	6,594
Benson	1,920	44.33%	2,216	51.17%	164	3.79%	24	0.55%	7	0.16%	-296	-6.83%	4,331
Billings	372	50.54%	311	42.26%	45	6.11%	6	0.82%	2	0.27%	61	8.29%	736
Bottineau	2,513	59.39%	1,571	37.13%	114	2.69%	23	0.54%	10	0.24%	942	22.26%	4,231
Bowman	723	49.83%	597	41.14%	116	7.99%	12	0.83%	3	0.21%	126	8.68%	1,451
Burke	1,212	50.95%	972	40.86%	169	7.10%	24	1.01%	2	0.08%	240	10.09%	2,379
Burleigh	5,049	59.45%	3,117	36.70%	238	2.80%	67	0.79%	22	0.26%	1,932	22.75%	8,493
Cass	11,430	52.34%	9,937	45.51%	369	1.69%	65	0.30%	35	0.16%	1,493	6.84%	21,836
Cavalier	1,864	44.83%	2,198	52.86%	84	2.02%	5	0.12%	7	0.17%	-334	-8.03%	4,158
Dickey	1,774	54.89%	1,264	39.11%	176	5.45%	10	0.31%	8	0.25%	510	15.78%	3,232
Divide	981	48.14%	887	43.52%	158	7.75%	9	0.44%	3	0.15%	94	4.61%	2,038
Dunn	1,244	51.34%	1,074	44.33%	94	3.88%	7	0.29%	4	0.17%	170	7.02%	2,423
Eddy	952	46.85%	919	45.23%	141	6.94%	18	0.89%	2	0.10%	33	1.62%	2,032
Emmons	2,223	63.46%	1,187	33.89%	73	2.08%	16	0.46%	4	0.11%	1,036	29.57%	3,503
Foster	938	44.82%	1,089	52.03%	57	2.72%	5	0.24%	4	0.19%	-151	-7.21%	2,093
Golden Valley	788	56.25%	585	41.76%	20	1.43%	6	0.43%	2	0.14%	203	14.49%	1,401
Grand Forks	6,374	46.23%	6,996	50.74%	343	2.49%	61	0.44%	15	0.11%	-622	-4.51%	13,789
Grant	1,555	66.94%	689	29.66%	69	2.97%	6	0.26%	4	0.17%	866	37.28%	2,323
Griggs	1,036	44.31%	1,180	50.47%	104	4.45%	11	0.47%	7	0.30%	-144	-6.16%	2,338
Hettinger	1,517	64.33%	752	31.89%	79	3.35%	7	0.30%	3	0.13%	765	32.44%	2,358
Kidder	1,510	63.71%	773	32.62%	65	2.74%	16	0.68%	6	0.25%	737	31.10%	2,370
LaMoure	1,999	53.91%	1,481	39.94%	209	5.64%	15	0.40%	4	0.11%	518	13.97%	3,708
Logan	1,585	71.46%	557	25.11%	55	2.48%	10	0.45%	11	0.50%	1,028	46.35%	2,218
McHenry	2,578	56.45%	1,770	38.76%	203	4.44%	12	0.26%	4	0.09%	808	17.69%	4,567
McIntosh	2,203	79.36%	513	18.48%	47	1.69%	10	0.36%	3	0.11%	1,690	60.88%	2,776
McKenzie	1,168	45.08%	1,227	47.36%	185	7.14%	8	0.31%	3	0.12%	-59	-2.28%	2,591
McLean	2,762	50.10%	2,283	41.41%	364	6.60%	93	1.69%	11	0.20%	479	8.69%	5,513
Mercer	2,219	75.27%	643	21.81%	66	2.24%	15	0.51%	5	0.17%	1,576	53.46%	2,948
Morton	3,607	56.41%	2,521	39.43%	222	3.47%	31	0.48%	13	0.20%	1,086	16.98%	6,394
Mountrail	1,395	42.22%	1,521	46.04%	365	11.05%	17	0.51%	6	0.18%	-126	-3.81%	3,304
Nelson	1,672	47.26%	1,629	46.04%	222	6.27%	13	0.37%	2	0.06%	43	1.22%	3,538
Oliver	749	67.84%	304	27.54%	37	3.35%	10	0.91%	4	0.36%	445	40.31%	1,104
Pembina	2,406	46.67%	2,666	51.72%	66	1.28%	11	0.21%	6	0.12%	-260	-5.04%	5,155
Pierce	1,738	58.86%	1,147	38.84%	46	1.56%	13	0.44%	9	0.30%	591	20.01%	2,953
Ramsey	2,891	52.04%	2,458	44.25%	184	3.31%	17	0.31%	5	0.09%	433	7.79%	5,555
Ransom	1,772	50.85%	1,595	45.77%	94	2.70%	20	0.57%	4	0.11%	177	5.08%	3,485
Renville	812	46.61%	838	48.11%	74	4.25%	13	0.75%	5	0.29%	-26	-1.49%	1,742
Richland	3,448	48.73%	3,413	48.24%	183	2.59%	16	0.23%	15	0.21%	35	0.49%	7,075
Rolette	1,179	41.09%	1,565	54.55%	107	3.73%	9	0.31%	9	0.31%	-386	-13.45%	2,869
Sargent	1,387	45.73%	1,506	49.65%	125	4.12%	8	0.26%	7	0.23%	-119	-3.92%	3,033
Sheridan	1,554	78.92%	372	18.89%	36	1.83%	5	0.25%	2	0.10%	1,182	60.03%	1,969
Sioux	667	57.20%	465	39.88%	27	2.32%	6	0.51%	1	0.09%	202	17.32%	1,166
Slope	447	50.51%	388	43.84%	43	4.86%	7	0.79%	0	0.00%	59	6.67%	885
Stark	3,222	60.15%	2,017	37.65%	97	1.81%	10	0.19%	11	0.21%	1,205	22.49%	5,357
Steele	1,052	45.00%	1,163	49.74%	114	4.88%	7	0.30%	2	0.09%	-111	-4.75%	2,338
Stutsman	4,208	52.88%	3,415	42.92%	277	3.48%	45	0.57%	12	0.15%	793	9.97%	7,957
Towner	1,145	49.76%	1,100	47.81%	40	1.74%	9	0.39%	7	0.30%	45	1.96%	2,301
Traill	2,328	52.00%	1,874	41.86%	254	5.67%	14	0.31%	7	0.16%	454	10.14%	4,477
Walsh	2,646	37.63%	4,170	59.31%	196	2.79%	10	0.14%	9	0.13%	-1,524	-21.68%	7,031
Ward	5,514	48.64%	5,189	45.77%	576	5.08%	43	0.38%	15	0.13%	325	2.87%	11,337
Wells	2,385	59.83%	1,492	37.43%	74	1.86%	27	0.68%	8	0.20%	893	22.40%	3,986
Williams	2,133	38.82%	2,571	46.79%	743	13.52%	38	0.69%	10	0.18%	-438	-7.97%	5,495
Totals	115,139	52.17%	95,812	43.41%	8,391	3.80%	1,000	0.45%	374	0.17%	19,327	8.76%	220,716

==== Counties that flipped from Democratic to Republican ====
- Divide
- Eddy
- Nelson
- Ramsey
- Slope
- Towner
- Traill
- Ward

==== Counties that flipped from Republican to Democratic ====
- Sargent

== See also ==
- United States presidential elections in North Dakota
