= 1940 United States presidential election in North Dakota =

- November 5, 1940

All 4 North Dakota votes to the Electoral College

Nominee	Wendell Willkie	Franklin D. Roosevelt
Party	Republican	Democratic
Home state	New York	New York
Running mate	Charles L. McNary	Henry A. Wallace
Electoral vote	4	0
Popular vote	154,590	124,036
Percentage	55.06%	44.18%
County results
Willkie
50–60%
60–70%
70–80%
80–90%
90–100%
Roosevelt
50–60%
60–70%
President before election
Franklin D. Roosevelt
Democratic
Elected President
Franklin D. Roosevelt
Democratic

The 1940 United States presidential election in North Dakota took place on November 5, 1940, as part of the 1940 United States presidential election. Voters chose four representatives, or electors, to the Electoral College, who voted for president and vice president.

North Dakota was won by Wendell Willkie (R–New York), running with Minority Leader Charles L. McNary, with 55.06% of the popular vote, against incumbent President Franklin D. Roosevelt (D–New York), running with Secretary Henry A. Wallace, with 44.18% of the popular vote.

With 55.06% of the popular vote, North Dakota would prove to be Willkie's fourth strongest state in the 1940 election in terms of popular vote percentage, after fellow free-soil Plains West states South Dakota, Nebraska and Kansas.

This was the first election since North Dakota's inaugural 1892 election in which it voted for a losing candidate. Then, it narrowly voted for Populist candidate James B. Weaver. However, due to a fusion between Weaver and the winning Democrat Grover Cleveland, North Dakota cast a single elector for Cleveland as well. That makes this the first election in which North Dakota did not cast a single electoral vote for the winning candidate, or in which the state backed a losing Republican candidate.

== Results ==
1940 United States presidential election in North Dakota
Party	Candidate	Votes	%
Republican	Wendell Willkie	154,590	55.06%
Democratic	Franklin D. Roosevelt (inc.)	124,036	44.18%
Socialist	Norman Thomas	1,279	0.46%
Not Designated	Alfred Knutson	545	0.19%
Prohibition	Roger Babson	325	0.12%
Total votes		280,775	100%

=== Results by county ===
County	Wendell Willkie Republican		Franklin D. Roosevelt Democratic		Norman Thomas Socialist		Alfred Knutson Not Designated		Roger Babson Prohibition		Margin		Total votes cast
County	#	%	#	%	#	%	#	%	#	%	#	%	Total votes cast
Adams	1,231	58.76%	837	39.95%	19	0.91%	4	0.19%	4	0.19%	394	18.81%	2,095
Barnes	4,649	57.67%	3,384	41.97%	21	0.26%	3	0.04%	5	0.06%	1,265	15.69%	8,062
Benson	2,485	45.85%	2,898	53.47%	30	0.55%	2	0.04%	5	0.09%	-413	-7.62%	5,420
Billings	663	62.08%	404	37.83%	1	0.09%	0	0.00%	0	0.00%	259	24.25%	1,068
Bottineau	3,129	55.60%	2,469	43.87%	29	0.52%	1	0.02%	0	0.00%	660	11.73%	5,628
Bowman	927	50.63%	882	48.17%	20	1.09%	2	0.11%	0	0.00%	45	2.46%	1,831
Burke	1,951	57.53%	1,342	39.58%	80	2.36%	7	0.21%	11	0.32%	609	17.96%	3,391
Burleigh	5,858	57.06%	4,350	42.37%	29	0.28%	22	0.21%	7	0.07%	1,508	14.69%	10,266
Cass	12,567	51.11%	11,911	48.45%	74	0.30%	17	0.07%	17	0.07%	656	2.67%	24,586
Cavalier	2,845	50.64%	2,757	49.07%	10	0.18%	2	0.04%	4	0.07%	88	1.57%	5,618
Dickey	2,777	57.44%	1,721	35.59%	13	0.27%	314	6.49%	10	0.21%	1,056	21.84%	4,835
Divide	1,437	44.32%	1,771	54.63%	29	0.89%	1	0.03%	4	0.12%	-334	-10.30%	3,242
Dunn	2,132	60.29%	1,392	39.37%	6	0.17%	1	0.03%	5	0.14%	740	20.93%	3,536
Eddy	1,319	48.42%	1,368	50.22%	37	1.36%	0	0.00%	0	0.00%	-49	-1.80%	2,724
Emmons	3,515	77.29%	1,004	22.08%	21	0.46%	1	0.02%	7	0.15%	2,511	55.21%	4,548
Foster	1,109	43.20%	1,446	56.33%	8	0.31%	4	0.16%	0	0.00%	-337	-13.13%	2,567
Golden Valley	873	55.57%	689	43.86%	3	0.19%	6	0.38%	0	0.00%	184	11.71%	1,571
Grand Forks	7,043	45.42%	8,396	54.15%	46	0.30%	12	0.08%	9	0.06%	-1,353	-8.73%	15,506
Grant	2,815	81.52%	627	18.16%	11	0.32%	0	0.00%	0	0.00%	2,188	63.37%	3,453
Griggs	1,117	43.09%	1,464	56.48%	8	0.31%	3	0.12%	0	0.00%	-347	-13.39%	2,592
Hettinger	2,468	78.32%	671	21.29%	8	0.25%	4	0.13%	0	0.00%	1,797	57.03%	3,151
Kidder	2,214	72.31%	837	27.34%	2	0.07%	1	0.03%	8	0.26%	1,377	44.97%	3,062
LaMoure	2,943	63.70%	1,637	35.43%	26	0.56%	6	0.13%	8	0.17%	1,306	28.27%	4,620
Logan	2,572	83.59%	498	16.18%	5	0.16%	2	0.06%	0	0.00%	2,074	67.40%	3,077
McHenry	3,894	63.07%	2,225	36.04%	28	0.45%	21	0.34%	6	0.10%	1,669	27.03%	6,174
McIntosh	3,494	91.66%	318	8.34%	0	0.00%	0	0.00%	0	0.00%	3,176	83.32%	3,812
McKenzie	1,563	38.63%	2,440	60.31%	21	0.52%	8	0.20%	14	0.35%	-877	-21.68%	4,046
McLean	4,113	58.99%	2,666	38.24%	167	2.40%	13	0.19%	13	0.19%	1,447	20.75%	6,972
Mercer	3,341	85.36%	567	14.49%	5	0.13%	1	0.03%	0	0.00%	2,774	70.87%	3,914
Morton	5,499	65.25%	2,889	34.28%	22	0.26%	6	0.07%	12	0.14%	2,610	30.97%	8,428
Mountrail	1,981	44.67%	2,392	53.93%	39	0.88%	12	0.27%	11	0.25%	-411	-9.27%	4,435
Nelson	1,859	43.07%	2,435	56.42%	11	0.25%	6	0.14%	5	0.12%	-576	-13.35%	4,316
Oliver	1,356	83.55%	266	16.39%	1	0.06%	0	0.00%	0	0.00%	1,090	67.16%	1,623
Pembina	2,924	43.94%	3,711	55.76%	11	0.17%	1	0.02%	8	0.12%	-787	-11.83%	6,655
Pierce	2,349	61.64%	1,451	38.07%	5	0.13%	2	0.05%	4	0.10%	898	23.56%	3,811
Ramsey	3,629	50.44%	3,530	49.07%	25	0.35%	6	0.08%	4	0.06%	99	1.38%	7,194
Ransom	2,579	56.20%	1,986	43.28%	19	0.41%	3	0.07%	2	0.04%	593	12.92%	4,589
Renville	1,202	47.03%	1,298	50.78%	48	1.88%	8	0.31%	0	0.00%	-96	-3.76%	2,556
Richland	5,102	58.42%	3,584	41.04%	32	0.37%	6	0.07%	10	0.11%	1,518	17.38%	8,734
Rolette	1,555	35.41%	2,820	64.21%	10	0.23%	3	0.07%	4	0.09%	-1,265	-28.80%	4,392
Sargent	1,922	50.01%	1,894	49.28%	21	0.55%	1	0.03%	5	0.13%	28	0.73%	3,843
Sheridan	2,405	81.33%	543	18.36%	2	0.07%	7	0.24%	0	0.00%	1,862	62.97%	2,957
Sioux	1,167	66.84%	578	33.10%	1	0.06%	0	0.00%	0	0.00%	589	33.73%	1,746
Slope	801	57.58%	585	42.06%	4	0.29%	1	0.07%	0	0.00%	216	15.53%	1,391
Stark	4,367	67.63%	2,075	32.14%	7	0.11%	2	0.03%	6	0.09%	2,292	35.50%	6,457
Steele	1,328	47.70%	1,434	51.51%	17	0.61%	3	0.11%	2	0.07%	-106	-3.81%	2,784
Stutsman	5,634	58.92%	3,897	40.76%	19	0.20%	3	0.03%	9	0.09%	1,737	18.17%	9,562
Towner	1,630	50.29%	1,596	49.24%	10	0.31%	2	0.06%	3	0.09%	34	1.05%	3,241
Traill	2,882	53.47%	2,476	45.94%	15	0.28%	8	0.15%	9	0.17%	406	7.53%	5,390
Walsh	3,051	35.61%	5,499	64.18%	4	0.05%	1	0.01%	13	0.15%	-2,448	-28.57%	8,568
Ward	6,519	45.61%	7,669	53.66%	67	0.47%	13	0.09%	25	0.17%	-1,150	-8.05%	14,293
Wells	3,335	63.74%	1,878	35.89%	13	0.25%	1	0.02%	5	0.10%	1,457	27.85%	5,232
Williams	2,470	34.25%	4,579	63.50%	121	1.68%	31	0.43%	10	0.14%	-2,109	-29.25%	7,211
Total	154,590	55.06%	124,036	44.18%	1,279	0.46%	545	0.19%	325	0.12%	30,554	10.88%	280,775

==== Counties that flipped from Democratic to Republican ====
- Adams
- Barnes
- Cass
- Billings
- Bottineau
- Bowman
- Burke
- Burleigh
- Cavalier
- Dickey
- Dunn
- Emmons
- Golden Valley
- Grant
- Hettinger
- Kidder
- LaMoure
- Logan
- McHenry
- McIntosh
- McLean
- Mercer
- Morton
- Oliver
- Pierce
- Sioux
- Ramsey
- Ransom
- Richland
- Sheridan
- Sargent
- Slope
- Stark
- Stutsman
- Towner
- Traill
- Wells

== See also ==
- United States presidential elections in North Dakota
