= Oliver County, North Dakota =

County in North Dakota, United States

- County
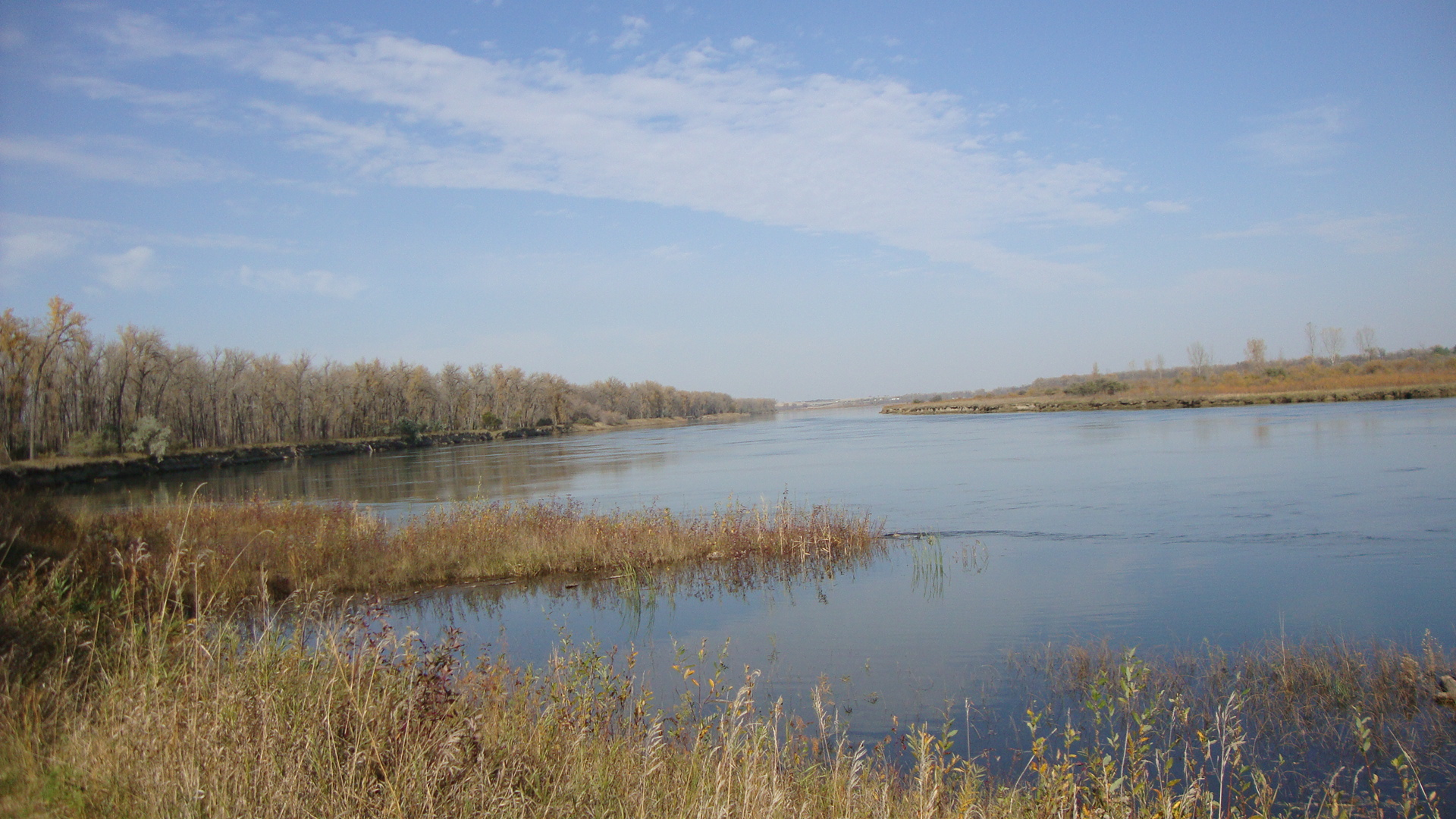
- Missouri River at Cross Ranch State Park.

- Location within the U.S. state of North Dakota
- Coordinates: 47.118079°N 101.33142°W
- Country: United States
- State: North Dakota
- Founded: April 14, 1885 (created); May 18, 1885 (organized)
- Named for: Harry S. Oliver
- Seat: Center
- Largest city: Center

Area
  - Total: 731.082 sq mi (1,893.49 km^{2})
  - Land: 722.404 sq mi (1,871.02 km^{2})
  - Water: 8.678 sq mi (22.48 km^{2}) 1.19%

Population (2020)
  - Total: 1,877
  - Estimate (2025): 1,898 ▲
  - Density: 2.606/sq mi (1.006/km^{2})
- Time zone: UTC−6 (Central)
  - Summer (DST): UTC−5 (CDT)
- Area code: 701
- Congressional district: At-large
- Website: olivercountynd.org

Oliver County is a county located in the U.S. state of North Dakota. As of the 2020 census, the population was 1,877, and was estimated to be 1,898 in 2025. The county seat and largest city is Center. Oliver County is included in the Bismarck Metropolitan Area.

== History ==
The Dakota Territory legislature created the county on April 14, 1885, with territory partitioned from Mercer County. It was named for Harry S. Oliver of Lisbon, North Dakota, a Republican politician and member of the Dakota Territory House of Representatives at the time. The county government was organized on May 18, with Sanger (then known as "Bentley") as county seat. The seat was moved to Center in 1902.

Oliver County is included in the Bismarck, North Dakota Metropolitan statistical area.

== Geography ==
The northeastern/eastern boundary of Oliver County is delineated by the Missouri River as it flows southeastward after leaving Lake Sakakawea. The county terrain consists of rolling hills, mostly devoted to agriculture. The terrain slopes to the east, with the highest point a hill near its southwestern corner, at 2,382 ft (726 m) ASL.

According to the United States Census Bureau, the county has a total area of 731.082 square miles (1,893.49 km^{2}), of which 722.404 square miles (1,871.02 km^{2}) is land and 8.678 square miles (22.48 km^{2}) (1.19%) is water. It is the 49th largest county and the fifth-smallest county in North Dakota by total area.

By sheer coincidence, the county seat, Center, named for being near the geographical center of the county, has also been calculated to be the geographic center of North America.

=== Major highways ===
- North Dakota Highway 25
- North Dakota Highway 31
- North Dakota Highway 48
- North Dakota Highway 200A
- North Dakota Highway 1806

=== Adjacent counties ===
- McLean County - northeast
- Burleigh County - east
- Morton County - south
- Mercer County - northwest

=== Protected areas ===
- Cross Ranch State Park

=== Lakes ===
- Mandan Lake
- Nelson Lake

== Demographics ==
Historical population
Census	Pop.	Note	%±
1890	464		—
1900	990		113.4%
1910	3,577		261.3%
1920	4,425		23.7%
1930	4,262		−3.7%
1940	3,859		−9.5%
1950	3,091		−19.9%
1960	2,610		−15.6%
1970	2,322		−11.0%
1980	2,495		7.5%
1990	2,381		−4.6%
2000	2,065		−13.3%
2010	1,846		−10.6%
2020	1,877		1.7%
2025 (est.)	1,898	▲	1.1%
U.S. Decennial Census; 1790–1960 1900–1990; 1990–2000 2010–2020

As of the fourth quarter of 2024, the median home value in Oliver County was $229,923.

As of the 2023 American Community Survey, there are 727 estimated households in Oliver County with an average of 2.50 persons per household. The county has a median household income of $76,953. Approximately 10.8% of the county's population lives at or below the poverty line. Oliver County has an estimated 61.3% employment rate, with 20.5% of the population holding a bachelor's degree or higher and 94.6% holding a high school diploma.

The top five reported ancestries (people were allowed to report up to two ancestries, thus the figures will generally add to more than 100%) were English (98.8%), Spanish (0.0%), Indo-European (0.9%), Asian and Pacific Islander (0.3%), and Other (0.0%).

The median age in the county was 46.1 years.

Oliver County, North Dakota – racial and ethnic composition
Note: the US Census treats Hispanic/Latino as an ethnic category. This table excludes Latinos from the racial categories and assigns them to a separate category. Hispanics/Latinos may be of any race.

Race / ethnicity (NH = non-Hispanic)	Pop. 1980	Pop. 1990	Pop. 2000	Pop. 2010	Pop. 2020
White alone (NH)	2,452 (98.28%)	2,338 (98.19%)	2,005 (97.09%)	1,782 (96.53%)	1,755 (93.50%)
Black or African American alone (NH)	2 (0.08%)	0 (0.00%)	1 (0.05%)	3 (0.16%)	3 (0.16%)
Native American or Alaska Native alone (NH)	36 (1.44%)	39 (1.64%)	25 (1.21%)	26 (1.41%)	23 (1.23%)
Asian alone (NH)	1 (0.04%)	0 (0.00%)	2 (0.10%)	4 (0.22%)	5 (0.27%)
Pacific Islander alone (NH)	—	—	0 (0.00%)	0 (0.00%)	3 (0.16%)
Other race alone (NH)	0 (0.00%)	0 (0.00%)	0 (0.00%)	0 (0.00%)	1 (0.05%)
Mixed race or multiracial (NH)	—	—	19 (0.92%)	12 (0.65%)	59 (3.14%)
Hispanic or Latino (any race)	4 (0.16%)	4 (0.17%)	13 (0.63%)	19 (1.03%)	28 (1.49%)
Total	2,495 (100.00%)	2,381 (100.00%)	2,065 (100.00%)	1,846 (100.00%)	1,877 (100.00%)

=== 2024 estimate ===
As of the 2024 estimate, there were 1,882 people and 727 households residing in the county. The population density was 2.61 inhabitants per square mile (1.0/km^{2}). There were 922 housing units at an average density of 1.28 per square mile (0.5/km^{2}). The racial makeup of the county was 94.5% White (92.7% NH White), 0.5% African American, 3.1% Native American, 0.4% Asian, 0.0% Pacific Islander, _% from some other races and 1.5% from two or more races. Hispanic or Latino people of any race were 2.1% of the population.

=== 2020 census ===
As of the 2020 census, there were 1,877 people, 760 households, and 537 families residing in the county. The population density was 2.60 inhabitants per square mile (1.0/km^{2}). There were 912 housing units at an average density of 1.26 per square mile (0.5/km^{2}).

Of the residents, 24.7% were under the age of 18 and 21.6% were 65 years of age or older; the median age was 44.5 years. For every 100 females there were 110.7 males, and for every 100 females age 18 and over there were 114.9 males.

The racial makeup of the county was 93.6% White, 0.2% Black or African American, 1.3% American Indian and Alaska Native, 0.3% Asian, 0.7% from some other race, and 3.8% from two or more races. Hispanic or Latino residents of any race comprised 1.5% of the population.

Of the 760 households, 27.4% had children under the age of 18 living with them and 13.4% had a female householder with no spouse or partner present. About 24.7% of all households were made up of individuals and 11.0% had someone living alone who was 65 years of age or older.

Of the 912 housing units, 16.7% were vacant. Among occupied housing units, 85.4% were owner-occupied and 14.6% were renter-occupied. The homeowner vacancy rate was 2.2% and the rental vacancy rate was 16.5%.

=== 2010 census ===
As of the 2010 census, there were 1,846 people, 756 households, and 554 families residing in the county. The population density was 2.56 inhabitants per square mile (1.0/km^{2}). There were 905 housing units at an average density of 1.25 per square mile (0.5/km^{2}). The racial makeup of the county was 97.29% White, 0.16% African American, 1.52% Native American, 0.22% Asian, 0.00% Pacific Islander, 0.16% from some other races and 0.65% from two or more races. Hispanic or Latino people of any race were 1.03% of the population.

In terms of ancestry, 66.8% were German, 19.3% were Norwegian, 7.6% were Russian, 6.3% were English, and 4.4% were American.

There were 756 households, 25.0% had children under the age of 18 living with them, 65.5% were married couples living together, 4.8% had a female householder with no husband present, 26.7% were non-families, and 22.6% of all households were made up of individuals. The average household size was 2.44 and the average family size was 2.84. The median age was 47.6 years.

The median income for a household in the county was $62,308 and the median income for a family was $75,069. Males had a median income of $60,592 versus $28,409 for females. The per capita income for the county was $29,348. About 6.5% of families and 9.7% of the population were below the poverty line, including 13.0% of those under age 18 and 19.6% of those age 65 or over.

== Communities ==
=== City ===
- Center (county seat)

=== Unincorporated communities ===
- Fort Clark
- Hannover
- Hensler
- Price
- Sanger (originally "Bentley")

== Politics ==
Oliver County voters are traditionally Republican. In only one national election since 1936 has the county selected the Democratic Party candidate (as of 2024).

United States presidential election results for Oliver County, North Dakota
Year	Republican		Democratic		Third party(ies)	
Year	No.	%	No.	%	No.	%
1892	35	42.17%	0	0.00%	48	57.83%
1896	59	50.43%	58	49.57%	0	0.00%
1900	110	58.82%	75	40.11%	2	1.07%
1904	241	81.42%	46	15.54%	9	3.04%
1908	325	62.50%	179	34.42%	16	3.08%
1912	131	22.66%	139	24.05%	308	53.29%
1916	346	47.79%	327	45.17%	51	7.04%
1920	1,105	85.86%	111	8.62%	71	5.52%
1924	367	32.16%	31	2.72%	743	65.12%
1928	680	51.67%	631	47.95%	5	0.38%
1932	302	20.56%	1,152	78.42%	15	1.02%
1936	469	29.82%	906	57.60%	198	12.59%
1940	1,356	83.55%	266	16.39%	1	0.06%
1944	756	76.83%	219	22.26%	9	0.91%
1948	749	67.84%	304	27.54%	51	4.62%
1952	1,132	87.82%	143	11.09%	14	1.09%
1956	788	73.03%	279	25.86%	12	1.11%
1960	703	58.68%	494	41.24%	1	0.08%
1964	469	46.12%	548	53.88%	0	0.00%
1968	616	63.44%	269	27.70%	86	8.86%
1972	669	65.14%	293	28.53%	65	6.33%
1976	575	50.44%	529	46.40%	36	3.16%
1980	966	73.40%	270	20.52%	80	6.08%
1984	915	67.43%	419	30.88%	23	1.69%
1988	696	56.27%	526	42.52%	15	1.21%
1992	503	40.96%	306	24.92%	419	34.12%
1996	499	48.83%	333	32.58%	190	18.59%
2000	709	67.46%	244	23.22%	98	9.32%
2004	790	70.60%	310	27.70%	19	1.70%
2008	682	65.58%	332	31.92%	26	2.50%
2012	693	68.41%	281	27.74%	39	3.85%
2016	830	81.61%	119	11.70%	68	6.69%
2020	918	86.12%	129	12.10%	19	1.78%
2024	909	83.62%	156	14.35%	22	2.02%

== Education ==
School districts include:

- Beulah Public School District 27
- Center-Stanton Public School District 1
- Glen Ullin Public School District 48
- Hazen Public School District 3
- New Salem-Almont Public School District 49
- Washburn Public School District 4

Center previously had a separate school district, but it merged with Stanton's in 2004.

== See also ==
- National Register of Historic Places listings in Oliver County ND
