= 1992 United States presidential election in North Dakota =

- November 3, 1992
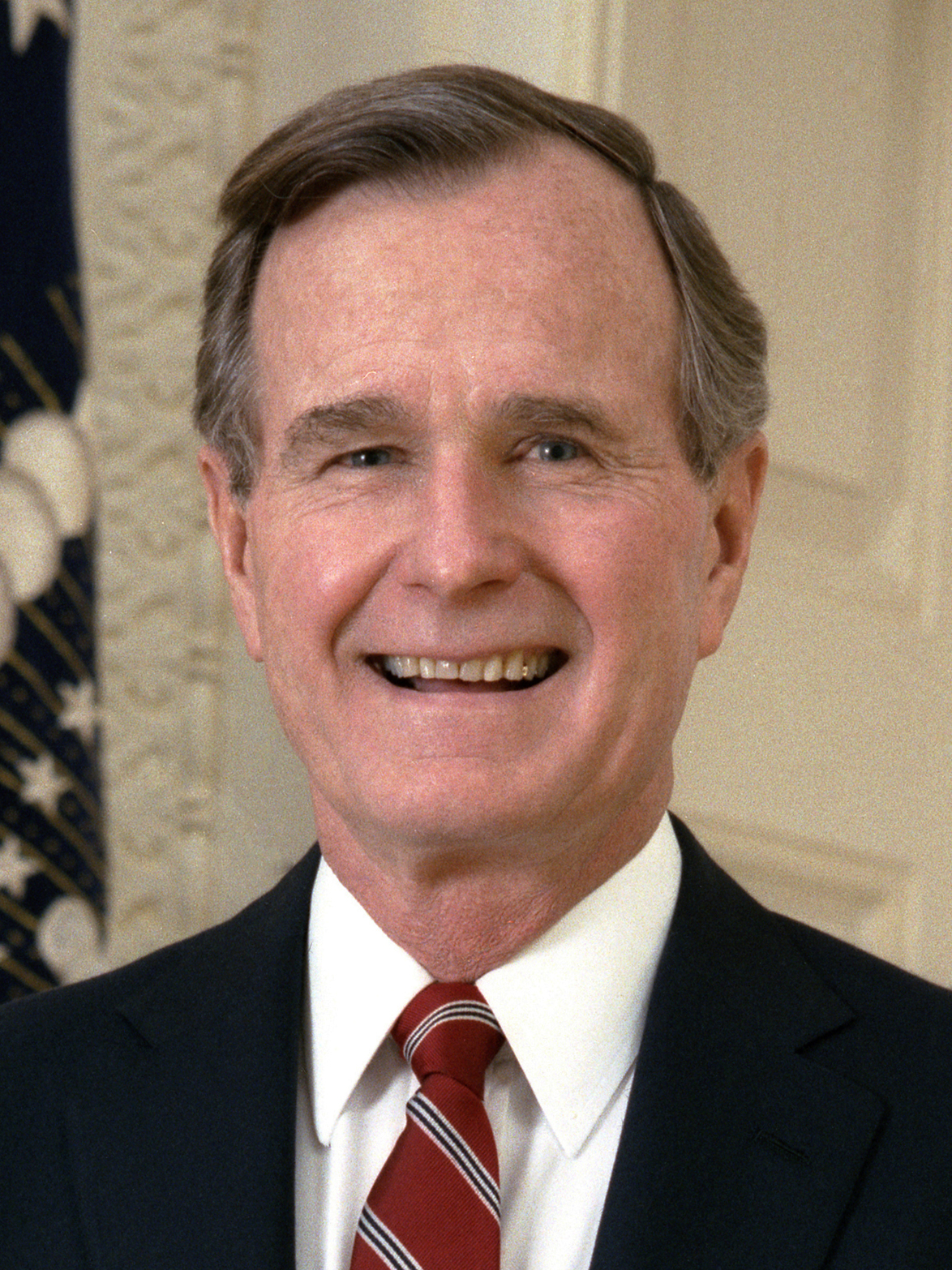

| Nominee | George H. W. Bush | Bill Clinton | Ross Perot |
| Party | Republican | Democratic–NPL | Independent |
| Home state | Texas | Arkansas | Texas |
| Running mate | Dan Quayle | Al Gore | James Stockdale |
| Electoral vote | 3 | 0 | 0 |
| Popular vote | 136,244 | 99,168 | 71,084 |
| Percentage | 44.22% | 32.18% | 23.07% |
County results
Bush
30–40%
40–50%
50–60%
Clinton
30–40%
40–50%
50–60%
President before election
George H. W. Bush
Republican
Elected President
Bill Clinton
Democratic–NPL

The 1992 United States presidential election in North Dakota took place on November 3, 1992, as part of the 1992 United States presidential election. Voters chose three representatives, or electors to the Electoral College, who voted for president and vice president.

North Dakota was won by incumbent President George H. W. Bush (R-Texas) with 44.22% of the popular vote over Governor Bill Clinton (D-Arkansas) with 32.18%. Businessman Ross Perot (I-Texas) finished in third, with 23.07% of the popular vote. Clinton ultimately won the national vote, defeating incumbent President Bush and Perot.

== Results ==
1992 United States presidential election in North Dakota
| Party | Candidate | Votes | Percentage | Electoral votes |
|---|---|---|---|---|
| Republican | George H. W. Bush (incumbent) | 136,244 | 44.22% | 3 |
| Democratic-NPL | Bill Clinton | 99,168 | 32.18% | 0 |
| Independent | Ross Perot | 71,084 | 23.07% | 0 |
| Independent | Lyndon LaRouche | 642 | 0.21% | 0 |
| Independent | Andre Marrou | 416 | 0.14% | 0 |
| Independent | Dr. John Hagelin | 240 | 0.08% | 0 |
| Independent | James Warren | 193 | 0.06% | 0 |
| Independent | Lenora Fulani | 143 | 0.05% | 0 |
| Prohibition | Earl Dodge (write-in) | 3 | >0.01% | 0 |
| Totals | | 308,133 | 100.0% | 3 |

=== Results by county ===
| County | George H. W. Bush Republican | | Bill Clinton Democratic-NPL | | Ross Perot Independent | | Lyndon LaRouche Independent | | Various candidates Other parties | | Margin | | Total votes cast |
| County | # | % | # | % | # | % | # | % | # | % | # | % | Total votes cast |
|---|---|---|---|---|---|---|---|---|---|---|---|---|---|
| Adams | 647 | 39.79% | 469 | 28.84% | 499 | 30.69% | 5 | 0.31% | 6 | 0.37% | 148 (Note: In this county where Perot ran second ahead of Clinton, margin given is Bush vote minus Perot vote and percentage margin Bush percentage minus Perot percentage.) | 9.10% | 1,626 |
| Barnes | 2,728 | 42.30% | 2,124 | 32.94% | 1,568 | 24.31% | 8 | 0.12% | 21 | 0.33% | 604 | 9.36% | 6,449 |
| Benson | 874 | 33.30% | 1,126 | 42.90% | 610 | 23.24% | 13 | 0.50% | 2 | 0.08% | -252 | -9.60% | 2,625 |
| Billings | 279 | 41.15% | 123 | 18.14% | 270 | 39.82% | 4 | 0.59% | 2 | 0.29% | 9 | 1.33% | 678 |
| Bottineau | 1,787 | 43.54% | 1,266 | 30.85% | 1,036 | 25.24% | 4 | 0.10% | 11 | 0.27% | 521 | 12.69% | 4,104 |
| Bowman | 712 | 37.34% | 506 | 26.53% | 678 | 35.55% | 8 | 0.42% | 3 | 0.16% | 34 | 1.79% | 1,907 |
| Burke | 551 | 36.15% | 458 | 30.05% | 506 | 33.20% | 5 | 0.33% | 4 | 0.26% | 45 | 2.95% | 1,524 |
| Burleigh | 16,484 | 50.90% | 8,940 | 27.61% | 6,780 | 20.94% | 68 | 0.21% | 112 | 0.35% | 7,544 | 23.29% | 32,384 |
| Cass | 25,312 | 47.65% | 18,077 | 34.03% | 9,513 | 17.91% | 61 | 0.11% | 153 | 0.29% | 7,235 | 13.62% | 53,116 |
| Cavalier | 1,527 | 48.85% | 866 | 27.70% | 723 | 23.13% | 6 | 0.19% | 4 | 0.13% | 661 | 21.15% | 3,126 |
| Dickey | 1,514 | 49.48% | 918 | 30.00% | 616 | 20.13% | 3 | 0.10% | 9 | 0.29% | 596 | 19.48% | 3,060 |
| Divide | 515 | 31.79% | 634 | 39.14% | 456 | 28.15% | 7 | 0.43% | 8 | 0.49% | -119 | -7.35% | 1,620 |
| Dunn | 784 | 37.24% | 667 | 31.69% | 637 | 30.26% | 8 | 0.38% | 9 | 0.43% | 117 | 5.55% | 2,105 |
| Eddy | 591 | 36.59% | 575 | 35.60% | 432 | 26.75% | 8 | 0.50% | 9 | 0.56% | 16 | 0.99% | 1,615 |
| Emmons | 1,047 | 43.09% | 595 | 24.49% | 774 | 31.85% | 8 | 0.33% | 6 | 0.25% | 273 | 11.24% | 2,430 |
| Foster | 803 | 41.39% | 565 | 29.12% | 556 | 28.66% | 8 | 0.41% | 8 | 0.41% | 238 | 12.27% | 1,940 |
| Golden Valley | 503 | 45.15% | 255 | 22.89% | 352 | 31.60% | 2 | 0.18% | 2 | 0.18% | 151 | 13.55% | 1,114 |
| Grand Forks | 13,705 | 44.06% | 10,930 | 35.14% | 6,349 | 20.41% | 26 | 0.08% | 94 | 0.30% | 2,775 | 8.92% | 31,104 |
| Grant | 900 | 45.94% | 415 | 21.18% | 629 | 32.11% | 9 | 0.46% | 6 | 0.31% | 271 | 13.83% | 1,959 |
| Griggs | 773 | 44.02% | 647 | 36.85% | 330 | 18.79% | 3 | 0.17% | 3 | 0.17% | 126 | 7.17% | 1,756 |
| Hettinger | 854 | 46.46% | 465 | 25.30% | 500 | 27.20% | 16 | 0.87% | 3 | 0.16% | 354 | 19.26% | 1,838 |
| Kidder | 739 | 43.19% | 468 | 27.35% | 489 | 28.58% | 10 | 0.58% | 5 | 0.29% | 250 | 14.61% | 1,711 |
| LaMoure | 1,270 | 45.96% | 797 | 28.85% | 679 | 24.57% | 8 | 0.29% | 9 | 0.33% | 473 | 17.11% | 2,763 |
| Logan | 703 | 47.31% | 383 | 25.77% | 390 | 26.24% | 8 | 0.54% | 2 | 0.13% | 313 | 21.07% | 1,486 |
| McHenry | 1,321 | 38.90% | 1,173 | 34.54% | 886 | 26.09% | 8 | 0.24% | 8 | 0.24% | 148 | 4.36% | 3,396 |
| McIntosh | 1,134 | 55.21% | 450 | 21.91% | 454 | 22.10% | 12 | 0.58% | 4 | 0.19% | 680 | 33.11% | 2,054 |
| McKenzie | 1,324 | 42.85% | 787 | 25.47% | 969 | 31.36% | 7 | 0.23% | 3 | 0.10% | 355 | 11.49% | 3,090 |
| McLean | 2,124 | 40.05% | 1,808 | 34.09% | 1,330 | 25.08% | 25 | 0.47% | 16 | 0.30% | 316 | 5.96% | 5,303 |
| Mercer | 2,274 | 45.33% | 1,323 | 26.37% | 1,378 | 27.47% | 23 | 0.46% | 19 | 0.38% | 896 | 17.86% | 5,017 |
| Morton | 5,042 | 43.76% | 3,594 | 31.19% | 2,787 | 24.19% | 31 | 0.27% | 68 | 0.59% | 1,448 | 12.57% | 11,522 |
| Mountrail | 1,017 | 30.92% | 1,393 | 42.35% | 861 | 26.18% | 6 | 0.18% | 12 | 0.36% | -376 | -11.43% | 3,289 |
| Nelson | 864 | 39.17% | 841 | 38.12% | 486 | 22.03% | 2 | 0.09% | 13 | 0.59% | 23 | 1.05% | 2,206 |
| Oliver | 503 | 40.96% | 306 | 24.92% | 407 | 33.14% | 9 | 0.73% | 3 | 0.24% | 96 | 7.82% | 1,228 |
| Pembina | 1,917 | 46.45% | 1,186 | 28.74% | 991 | 24.01% | 3 | 0.07% | 30 | 0.73% | 731 | 17.71% | 4,127 |
| Pierce | 1,099 | 45.21% | 761 | 31.30% | 554 | 22.79% | 13 | 0.53% | 4 | 0.16% | 338 | 13.91% | 2,431 |
| Ramsey | 2,516 | 41.56% | 2,008 | 33.17% | 1,507 | 24.89% | 9 | 0.15% | 14 | 0.23% | 508 | 8.39% | 6,054 |
| Ransom | 1,102 | 37.96% | 1,166 | 40.17% | 625 | 21.53% | 2 | 0.07% | 8 | 0.28% | -64 | -2.21% | 2,903 |
| Renville | 655 | 39.22% | 580 | 34.73% | 429 | 25.69% | 1 | 0.06% | 5 | 0.30% | 75 | 4.49% | 1,670 |
| Richland | 3,873 | 46.66% | 2,688 | 32.38% | 1,698 | 20.46% | 21 | 0.25% | 21 | 0.25% | 1,185 | 14.28% | 8,301 |
| Rolette | 895 | 24.82% | 2,002 | 55.52% | 660 | 18.30% | 18 | 0.50% | 31 | 0.86% | -1,107 | -30.70% | 3,606 |
| Sargent | 816 | 36.20% | 961 | 42.64% | 463 | 20.54% | 6 | 0.27% | 8 | 0.35% | -145 | -6.44% | 2,254 |
| Sheridan | 589 | 50.13% | 276 | 23.49% | 304 | 25.87% | 4 | 0.34% | 2 | 0.17% | 285 | 24.26% | 1,175 |
| Sioux | 264 | 26.83% | 463 | 47.05% | 244 | 24.80% | 8 | 0.81% | 5 | 0.51% | -199 | -20.22% | 984 |
| Slope | 226 | 42.24% | 145 | 27.10% | 162 | 30.28% | 1 | 0.19% | 1 | 0.19% | 64 | 11.96% | 535 |
| Stark | 4,491 | 42.06% | 3,003 | 28.12% | 3,123 | 29.25% | 36 | 0.34% | 25 | 0.23% | 1,368 | 12.81% | 10,678 |
| Steele | 503 | 36.72% | 598 | 43.65% | 267 | 19.49% | 1 | 0.07% | 1 | 0.07% | -95 | -6.93% | 1,370 |
| Stutsman | 4,039 | 40.39% | 3,313 | 33.13% | 2,580 | 25.80% | 23 | 0.23% | 46 | 0.46% | 726 | 7.26% | 10,001 |
| Towner | 600 | 34.15% | 748 | 42.57% | 402 | 22.88% | 3 | 0.17% | 4 | 0.23% | -148 | -8.42% | 1,757 |
| Traill | 2,019 | 44.34% | 1,638 | 35.98% | 875 | 19.22% | 7 | 0.15% | 14 | 0.31% | 381 | 8.36% | 4,553 |
| Walsh | 2,544 | 43.09% | 1,936 | 32.79% | 1,384 | 23.44% | 8 | 0.14% | 32 | 0.54% | 608 | 10.30% | 5,904 |
| Ward | 12,056 | 46.63% | 7,856 | 30.39% | 5,856 | 22.65% | 27 | 0.10% | 57 | 0.22% | 4,200 | 16.24% | 25,852 |
| Wells | 1,171 | 40.16% | 888 | 30.45% | 850 | 29.15% | 5 | 0.17% | 2 | 0.07% | 283 | 9.71% | 2,916 |
| Williams | 3,664 | 36.95% | 3,008 | 30.33% | 3,180 | 32.07% | 17 | 0.17% | 48 | 0.48% | 484 | 4.88% | 9,917 |
| Totals | 136,244 | 44.22% | 99,168 | 32.18% | 71,084 | 23.07% | 642 | 0.21% | 995 | 0.32% | 37,076 | 12.04% | 308,133 |

==== Counties that flipped from Democratic to Republican ====
- Nelson

== See also ==
- United States presidential elections in North Dakota
- Presidency of Bill Clinton
