= 1972 United States presidential election in North Dakota =

- November 7, 1972

Nominee	Richard Nixon	George McGovern
Party	Republican	Democratic-NPL (Note: The McGovern vote was under a state-specific Democratic-NPL that was separate to the National Democratic Party, similar to the Minnesota-DFL Party that ran McGovern in the presidential election in Minnesota.)
Home state	California	South Dakota
Running mate	Spiro Agnew	Sargent Shriver
Electoral vote	3	0
Popular vote	174,109	100,384
Percentage	62.07%	35.79%
County results
Nixon
40–50%
50–60%
60–70%
70–80%
80–90%
McGovern
50–60%
President before election
Richard Nixon
Republican
Elected President
Richard Nixon
Republican

The 1972 United States presidential election in North Dakota took place on November 7, 1972, as part of the 1972 United States presidential election. Voters chose three representatives, or electors, to the Electoral College, who voted for president and vice president.

North Dakota was won by incumbent President Richard Nixon (R–California), with 62.07 percent of the popular vote, against George McGovern (D–South Dakota), with 35.79 percent of the popular vote, a 26.28 percent margin of victory. Three other candidates were on the ballot as independents, but only California Congressman John G. Schmitz received a significant vote tally, although even Schmitz received just 2.01 percent of North Dakota's total.

In a state that would reflect McGovern's national results, the Democratic nominee only won one county (Rolette) in North Dakota.

== Results ==
1972 United States presidential election in North Dakota
Party	Candidate	Votes	%
Republican	Richard Nixon (inc.)	174,109	62.07%
Democratic–NPL	George McGovern	100,384	35.79%
Independent	John G. Schmitz	5,646	2.01%
Independent	Linda Jenness	288	0.10%
Independent	Gus Hall	87	0.03%
Total votes		280,514	100%

=== Results by county ===
County	Richard Nixon Republican		George McGovern Democratic-NPL		John G. Schmitz Independent		Linda Jenness Independent		Gus Hall Independent		Margin		Total votes cast
County	#	%	#	%	#	%	#	%	#	%	#	%	Total votes cast
Adams	1,177	62.77%	665	35.47%	32	1.71%	1	0.05%	0	0.00%	512	27.30%	1,875
Barnes	4,518	61.14%	2,804	37.95%	66	0.89%	1	0.01%	0	0.00%	1,714	23.19%	7,389
Benson	2,050	55.09%	1,635	43.94%	36	0.97%	0	0.00%	0	0.00%	415	11.15%	3,721
Billings	509	69.82%	192	26.34%	28	3.84%	0	0.00%	0	0.00%	317	43.48%	729
Bottineau	3,263	69.60%	1,369	29.20%	52	1.11%	2	0.04%	2	0.04%	1,894	40.40%	4,688
Bowman	1,111	61.69%	643	35.70%	47	2.61%	0	0.00%	0	0.00%	468	25.99%	1,801
Burke	1,446	66.36%	651	29.88%	81	3.72%	1	0.05%	0	0.00%	795	36.48%	2,179
Burleigh	13,909	67.38%	5,841	28.29%	838	4.06%	48	0.23%	8	0.04%	8,068	39.09%	20,644
Cass	21,770	59.96%	14,073	38.76%	388	1.07%	57	0.16%	18	0.05%	7,697	21.20%	36,306
Cavalier	2,898	60.07%	1,867	38.70%	54	1.12%	3	0.06%	2	0.04%	1,031	21.37%	4,824
Dickey	2,277	63.59%	1,266	35.35%	38	1.06%	0	0.00%	0	0.00%	1,011	28.24%	3,581
Divide	1,230	60.29%	774	37.94%	36	1.76%	0	0.00%	0	0.00%	456	22.35%	2,040
Dunn	1,438	65.45%	644	29.31%	113	5.14%	1	0.05%	1	0.05%	794	36.14%	2,197
Eddy	1,022	52.04%	911	46.38%	28	1.43%	3	0.15%	0	0.00%	111	5.66%	1,964
Emmons	2,194	64.53%	1,115	32.79%	89	2.62%	1	0.03%	1	0.03%	1,079	31.74%	3,400
Foster	1,352	60.28%	861	38.39%	29	1.29%	1	0.04%	0	0.00%	491	21.89%	2,243
Golden Valley	774	62.98%	362	29.45%	93	7.57%	0	0.00%	0	0.00%	412	33.53%	1,229
Grand Forks	13,361	56.92%	9,416	40.11%	631	2.69%	59	0.25%	8	0.03%	3,945	16.81%	23,475
Grant	1,569	70.17%	596	26.65%	69	3.09%	2	0.09%	0	0.00%	973	43.52%	2,236
Griggs	1,312	58.10%	901	39.90%	45	1.99%	0	0.00%	0	0.00%	411	18.20%	2,258
Hettinger	1,511	64.93%	726	31.20%	89	3.82%	1	0.04%	0	0.00%	785	33.73%	2,327
Kidder	1,315	67.06%	557	28.40%	89	4.54%	0	0.00%	0	0.00%	758	38.66%	1,961
LaMoure	2,110	59.62%	1,399	39.53%	30	0.85%	0	0.00%	0	0.00%	711	20.09%	3,539
Logan	1,408	69.33%	554	27.28%	67	3.30%	1	0.05%	1	0.05%	854	42.05%	2,031
McHenry	2,765	63.62%	1,554	35.76%	26	0.60%	1	0.02%	0	0.00%	1,211	27.86%	4,346
McIntosh	2,440	81.61%	521	17.42%	29	0.97%	0	0.00%	0	0.00%	1,919	64.19%	2,990
McKenzie	1,913	65.87%	937	32.27%	53	1.83%	1	0.03%	0	0.00%	976	33.60%	2,904
McLean	3,575	66.23%	1,703	31.55%	115	2.13%	3	0.06%	2	0.04%	1,872	34.68%	5,398
Mercer	2,567	74.28%	784	22.69%	104	3.01%	1	0.03%	0	0.00%	1,783	51.59%	3,456
Morton	5,494	59.87%	3,312	36.09%	358	3.90%	8	0.09%	5	0.05%	2,182	23.78%	9,177
Mountrail	2,038	58.30%	1,391	39.79%	64	1.83%	1	0.03%	2	0.06%	647	18.51%	3,496
Nelson	1,625	53.67%	1,358	44.85%	40	1.32%	5	0.17%	0	0.00%	267	8.82%	3,028
Oliver	669	65.14%	293	28.53%	64	6.23%	1	0.10%	0	0.00%	376	36.61%	1,027
Pembina	3,317	63.75%	1,801	34.61%	84	1.61%	1	0.02%	0	0.00%	1,516	29.14%	5,203
Pierce	1,970	66.15%	973	32.67%	32	1.07%	1	0.03%	2	0.07%	997	33.48%	2,978
Ramsey	3,954	61.78%	2,384	37.25%	61	0.95%	1	0.02%	0	0.00%	1,570	24.53%	6,400
Ransom	2,056	59.85%	1,355	39.45%	23	0.67%	1	0.03%	0	0.00%	701	20.40%	3,435
Renville	1,121	61.09%	702	38.26%	10	0.54%	2	0.11%	0	0.00%	419	22.83%	1,835
Richland	5,194	60.23%	3,367	39.04%	60	0.70%	1	0.01%	2	0.02%	1,827	21.19%	8,624
Rolette	1,713	48.13%	1,803	50.66%	38	1.07%	2	0.06%	3	0.08%	−90	−2.53%	3,559
Sargent	1,616	54.48%	1,331	44.88%	19	0.64%	0	0.00%	0	0.00%	285	9.60%	2,966
Sheridan	1,460	80.71%	334	18.46%	15	0.83%	0	0.00%	0	0.00%	1,126	62.25%	1,809
Sioux	561	49.12%	557	48.77%	24	2.10%	0	0.00%	0	0.00%	4	0.35%	1,142
Slope	413	59.86%	249	36.09%	28	4.06%	0	0.00%	0	0.00%	164	23.77%	690
Stark	5,115	62.91%	2,636	32.42%	349	4.29%	27	0.33%	4	0.05%	2,479	30.49%	8,131
Steele	1,063	53.96%	892	45.28%	15	0.76%	0	0.00%	0	0.00%	171	8.68%	1,970
Stutsman	6,269	62.51%	3,589	35.79%	156	1.56%	11	0.11%	3	0.03%	2,680	26.72%	10,028
Towner	1,349	58.02%	944	40.60%	30	1.29%	1	0.04%	1	0.04%	405	17.42%	2,325
Traill	3,118	61.40%	1,892	37.26%	65	1.28%	2	0.04%	1	0.02%	1,226	24.14%	5,078
Walsh	3,991	56.29%	2,908	41.02%	184	2.60%	4	0.06%	3	0.04%	1,083	15.27%	7,090
Ward	13,900	66.61%	6,706	32.14%	227	1.09%	28	0.13%	7	0.03%	7,194	34.47%	20,868
Wells	2,519	64.42%	1,297	33.17%	94	2.40%	0	0.00%	0	0.00%	1,222	31.25%	3,910
Williams	4,800	59.90%	2,989	37.30%	211	2.63%	8	0.10%	6	0.07%	1,811	22.60%	8,014
Totals	174,109	62.07%	100,384	35.79%	5,646	2.01%	288	0.10%	87	0.03%	73,725	26.28%	280,514

== See also ==
- United States presidential elections in North Dakota
