= Fred Krause House =

Historic house in North Dakota, United States

- U.S. National Register of Historic Places
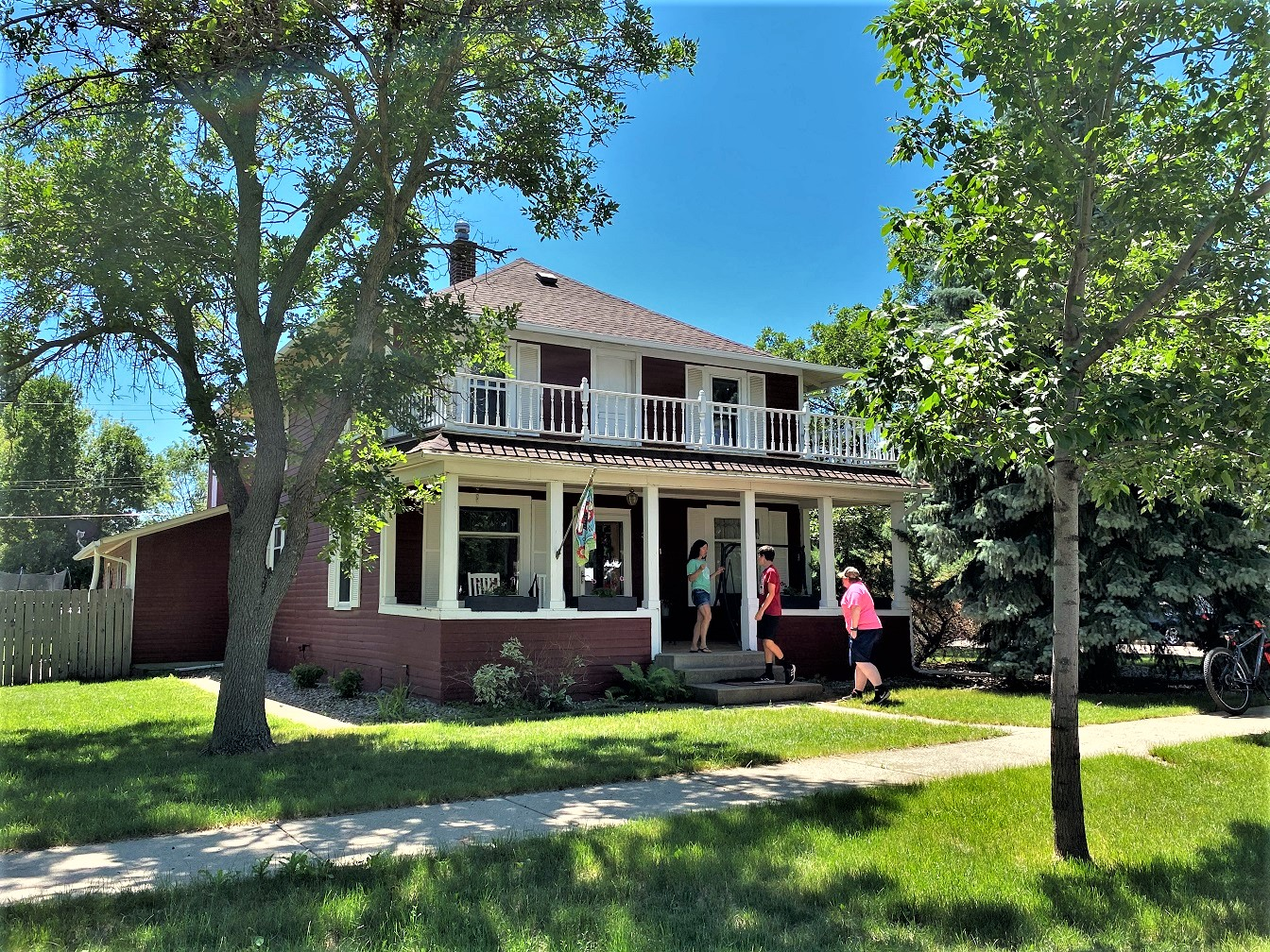

- Location within North Dakota Location within the United States
- Location: 321 W. Main St. Hazen, North Dakota
- Coordinates: 47°17′39″N 101°37′43″W
- Area: less than one acre
- Built: 1916
- Built by: G.H. Korupp
- Architectural style: Late 19th and Early 20th Century American Movements, American Foursquare
- NRHP reference No.: 92000344
- Added to NRHP: April 14, 1992

The Fred Krause House in Hazen, North Dakota, United States, was built in 1916. It has also been known as the Joe Friedlander House. It was listed on the National Register of Historic Places (NRHP) in 1992.

According to its NRHP nomination, it is one of "a rare few" American Foursquare homes in North Dakota that "retain essential integrity of porch, siding and decorative features."
