= Center-Stanton Public School District 1 =

School district in North Dakota, United States

Address
- 315 Lincoln Avenue Center, North Dakota, 58530; United States

District information
- Type: Public
- Grades: PreK–12
- NCES District ID: 3800052

Students and staff
- Students: 259
- Teachers: 22.57
- Staff: 20.02
- Student–teacher ratio: 11.48

Other information
- Website: www.center-stanton.k12.nd.us

Center-Stanton Public School District 1 is a school district headquartered in Center, North Dakota.

It is partly in Oliver County, including Center, and partly in Mercer County, including Stanton.

The district formed in July 2004 from the merger of the Center and Stanton school districts. Center district voters approved the merger on a 216-47 basis while Stanton voters approved the merger on a 213-13 basis. As a result of the merger Stanton High School immediately closed, and the district planned to keep Stanton Elementary open until at least the 2006–2007 school year. Both schools in Center remained open.

The Stanton school, which opened circa 1883, had 16 students in 2008. It closed that year and the district now has Center as its only school.
