= Hannover, North Dakota =

Hannover
- Unincorporated community
- Location within the state of North Dakota Hannover (the United States)
- Coordinates: 47°06′41″N 101°25′36″W
- Country: United States
- State: North Dakota
- County: Oliver
- Elevation: 2,142 ft (653 m)
- Time zone: UTC-6 (Central (CST))
  - Summer (DST): UTC-5 (CDT)
- Area code: 701
- GNIS feature ID: 1029305

Hannover is an unincorporated community in central Oliver County, North Dakota, United States. It lies at the intersection of North Dakota Highways 25 and 31, west of the city of Center, the county seat of Oliver County.

The name is derived from the German town of Hannover in Lower Saxony. Although more than a hundred towns, islands and provinces all over the world are named after the Lower Saxonian Capital, the North Dakota settlement is the only one that uses the German spelling with a double-⟨n⟩.
