= Golden Valley, North Dakota =

- City
- Logo

- Location of Golden Valley, North Dakota
- Coordinates: 47°17′25″N 102°03′55″W
- Country: United States
- State: North Dakota
- County: Mercer
- Founded: 1909

Area
  - Total: 0.75 sq mi (1.94 km^{2})
  - Land: 0.75 sq mi (1.94 km^{2})
  - Water: 0 sq mi (0.00 km^{2})
- Elevation: 1,942 ft (592 m)

Population (2020)
  - Total: 191
  - Estimate (2022): 189
  - Density: 255.2/sq mi (98.53/km^{2})
- Time zone: UTC-7 (Mountain (MST))
  - Summer (DST): UTC-6 (MDT)
- ZIP code: 58541
- Area code: 701
- FIPS code: 38-31180
- GNIS feature ID: 1036059
- Website: www.goldenvalleynd.com

Golden Valley is a city in Mercer County, North Dakota, United States. The population was 182 at the 2020 census.

== History ==
=== Founding of the settlement ===
In the year 1908, a settler originally from the city of Hebron named George Bratzel decided that he wanted to create a new town. He decided to purchase a 160 acres terrain, which was located 40 miles north of Hebron. The territory at the time was called the "Lee Haven farm". On May 19, 1909 he finished the construction of the very first building in the area, his shop, and immediately decided to throw a dance party to advertise both the area and his shop. Soon after, on June 1, 1909, the man applied for the Post Office, hoping for recognition. His request was soon approved.

=== Recent history ===
The area was initially known as "Olanta", up until 1913, when it was renamed by George himself Golden Valley. The city progressively got bigger as time passed.

== Geography ==
According to the United States Census Bureau, the city has a total area of 0.73 square miles (1.89 km^{2}), all land.

== Demographics ==
Historical population
Census	Pop.	Note	%±
1920	369		—
1930	294		−20.3%
1940	400		36.1%
1950	339		−15.2%
1960	286		−15.6%
1970	235		−17.8%
1980	287		22.1%
1990	239		−16.7%
2000	183		−23.4%
2010	182		−0.5%
2020	191		4.9%
2022 (est.)	189		−1.0%
U.S. Decennial Census; 2020 Census

=== 2010 census ===
As of the census of 2010, there were 182 people, 92 households and 54 families residing in the city. The population density was 249.3 inhabitants per square mile (96.3/km^{2}). There were 117 housing units at an average density of 160.3 per square mile (61.9/km^{2}). The racial makeup of the city was 97.3% White, 1.1% Native American, 1.1% Asian, and 0.5% from two or more races. Hispanic or Latino of any race were 1.6% of the population.

There were 92 households, of which 14.1% had children under the age of 18 living with them, 50.0% were married couples living together, 6.5% had a female householder with no husband present, 2.2% had a male householder with no wife present, and 41.3% were non-families. 38.0% of all households were made up of individuals, and 15.3% had someone living alone who was 65 years of age or older. The average household size was 1.98 and the average family size was 2.57.

The median age in the city was 50.2 years. 17% of residents were under the age of 18; 3.2% were between the ages of 18 and 24; 19.7% were from 25 to 44; 40.6% were from 45 to 64; and 19.2% were 65 years of age or older. The gender makeup of the city was 50.5% male and 49.5% female.

=== 2000 census ===
As of the census of 2000, there were 183 people, 91 households and 51 families residing in the city. The population density was 253.2 inhabitants per square mile (97.8/km^{2}). There were 124 housing units at an average density of 171.6 per square mile (66.3/km^{2}). The racial makeup of the city was 99.45% White, and 0.55% from two or more races.

There were 91 households, out of which 18.7% had children under the age of 18 living with them, 46.2% were married couples living together, 9.9% had a female householder with no husband present and 42.9% were non-families. 37.4% of all households were made up of individuals, and 19.8% had someone living alone who was 65 years of age or older. The average household size was 2.01 and the average family size was 2.63.

In the city, the population was spread out, with 17.5% under the age of 18, 4.9% from 18 to 24, 20.2% from 25 to 44, 31.7% from 45 to 64, and 25.7% who were 65 years of age or older. The median age was 47 years. For every 100 females, there were 98.9 males. For every 100 females age 18 and over, there were 104.1 males.

The median income for a household in the city was $27,188, and the median income for a family was $39,688. Males had a median income of $38,125 versus $15,625 for females. The per capita income for the city was $14,783. Approximately 18.4% of families and 20.7% of the population were below the poverty line, including 35.1% of those under the age of eighteen and 7.8% of those sixty-five or over.

== Education ==
Golden Valley is in the Beulah Public School District 27.
