= Mercer County, North Dakota =

County in North Dakota, United States

- County
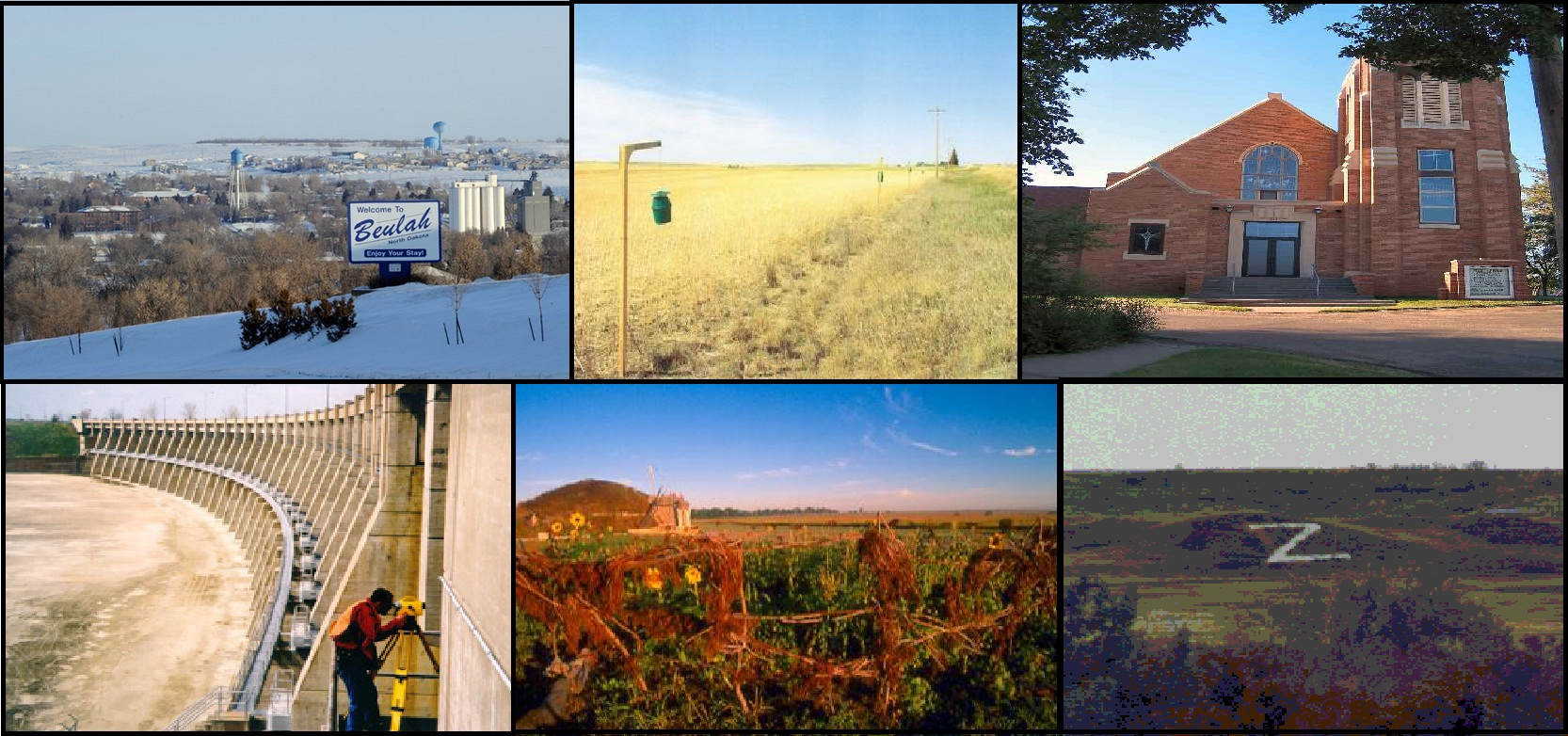
- Cities of Mercer, left-to-right, up-to-down; Beulah, Golden Valley, Hazen, Pick City, Stanton, and Zap

- Location within the U.S. state of North Dakota
- Coordinates: 47.307147°N 101.833328°W
- Country: United States
- State: North Dakota
- Founded: January 14, 1875 (created); November 6, 1883 (organized)
- Named for: W. H. H. Mercer
- Seat: Stanton
- Largest city: Beulah

Area
  - Total: 1,112.597 sq mi (2,881.61 km^{2})
  - Land: 1,042.781 sq mi (2,700.79 km^{2})
  - Water: 69.816 sq mi (180.82 km^{2}) 6.28%

Population (2020)
  - Total: 8,350
  - Estimate (2025): 8,441 ▲
  - Density: 8.006/sq mi (3.091/km^{2})
- Time zone: UTC−6 (Central)
  - Summer (DST): UTC−5 (CDT)
- Area code: 701
- Congressional district: At-large
- Website: mercercountynd.com

Mercer County is a county in the U.S. state of North Dakota. As of the 2020 census, the population was 8,350. and was estimated to be 8,441 in 2025. The county seat is Stanton and the largest city is Beulah.

== History ==
The Dakota Territory legislature enacted a January 8, 1873 law to create a county named Mercer, whose boundaries would be identical to Pratt (a now-extinct county). This county did not come into existence, as the 1873 act was nullified on January 14, 1875, by the legislature. On that date the legislature created another Mercer County, from previously unorganized territory. The county was named for William Henry Harrison Mercer, (1844–1901), a rancher who settled north of Bismarck in 1869. The unorganized county was not attached to another county for judicial or administrative purposes; this condition continued until November 6, 1883, when the county government was organized.

The county boundaries were altered in 1879, 1881, 1885, 1892, and 1901. Its boundaries have remained unchanged since 1901.

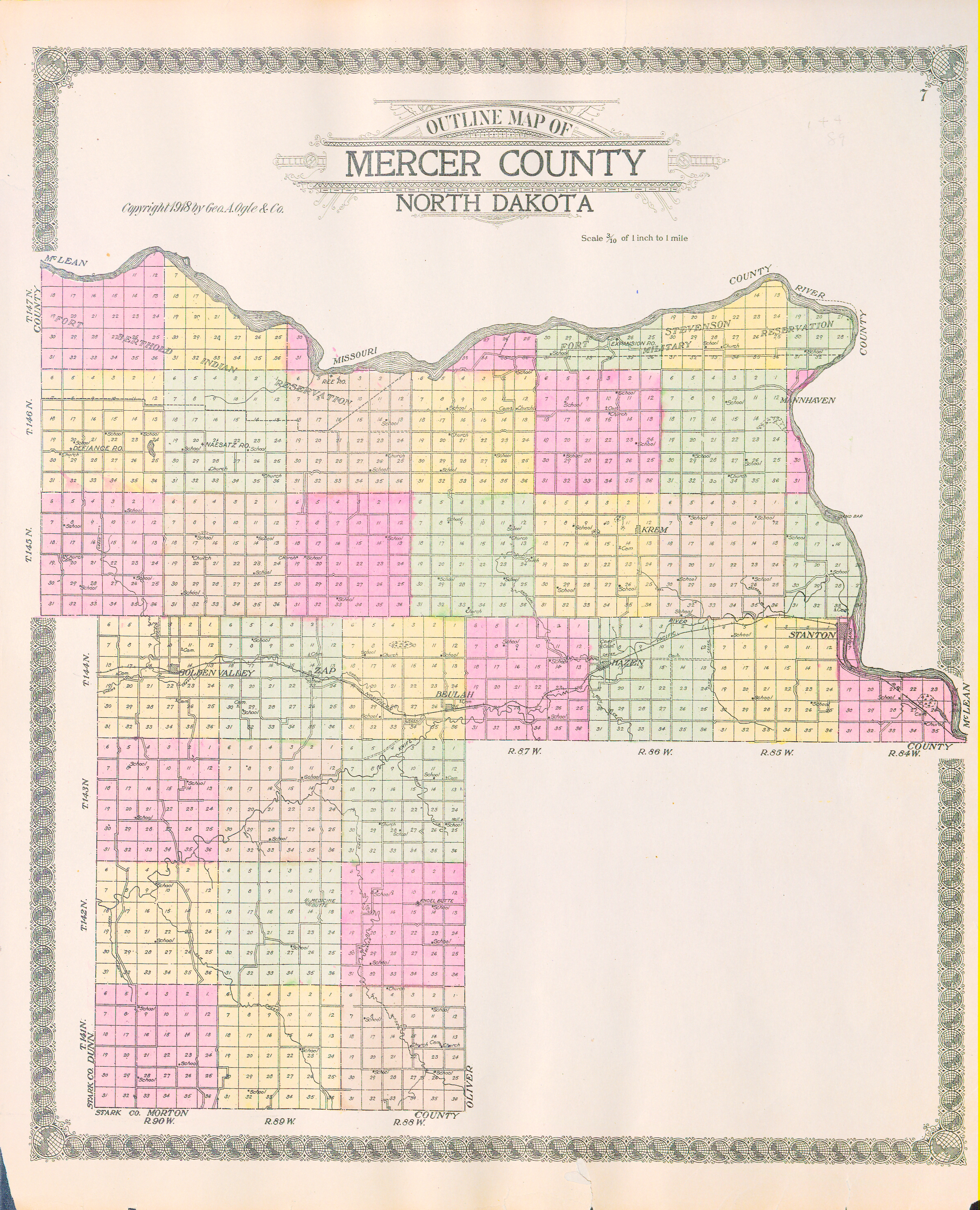
Outline map of Mercer County, North Dakota, 1918

== Geography ==
The northern boundary of Mercer County is delineated by Lake Sakakawea, created in 1956 on the Missouri River. The county's eastern boundary is delineated by the river as it flows southeastward from the dam that created the lake. The county terrain consists of rolling hills, largely devoted to agriculture. The terrain slopes to the north and east; its highest point is near the midpoint of its southern boundary, at 2,451 ft (747 m) ASL.

According to the United States Census Bureau, the county has a total area of 1,112.597 square miles (2,881.61 km^{2}), of which 1,042.781 square miles (2,700.79 km^{2}) is land and 69.816 square miles (180.82 km^{2}) (6.28%) is water. It is the 35th largest county in North Dakota by total area.

The southwestern corner counties of North Dakota (Adams, Billings, Bowman, Golden Valley, Grant, Hettinger, Slope, Stark) observe Mountain Time. The counties of McKenzie, Dunn, and Sioux counties are split, with their northern portions observing Central Time and the southern portions observing Mountain Time.

Prior to November 7, 2010, the western portion of Mercer County was in Mountain Time. But it was all moved into the Central Time on that date.

=== Major highways ===
- North Dakota Highway 31
- North Dakota Highway 48
- North Dakota Highway 49
- North Dakota Highway 200
- North Dakota Highway 200A
- North Dakota Highway 1806

=== Adjacent counties ===
- McLean County - north
- Oliver County - east
- Morton County - south
- Stark County - southwest (observes Mountain Time)
- Dunn County - west (observes Mountain Time in southern portion)

=== Protected areas ===
- Beaver Creek State Game Management Area
- Hazen Bay Recreation Area
- Knife River Indian Villages National Historic Site
- Lake Sakakawea State Park

=== Lake ===
- Lake Sakakawea

== Demographics ==
Historical population
Census	Pop.	Note	%±
1890	428		—
1900	1,778		315.4%
1910	4,747		167.0%
1920	8,224		73.2%
1930	9,516		15.7%
1940	9,611		1.0%
1950	8,686		−9.6%
1960	6,805		−21.7%
1970	6,175		−9.3%
1980	9,404		52.3%
1990	9,808		4.3%
2000	8,644		−11.9%
2010	8,424		−2.5%
2020	8,350		−0.9%
2025 (est.)	8,441	▲	1.1%
U.S. Decennial Census; 1790–1960 1900–1990; 1990–2000 2010–2020

As of the fourth quarter of 2024, the median home value in Mercer County was $207,885.

As of the 2023 American Community Survey, there are 3,594 estimated households in Mercer County with an average of 2.27 persons per household. The county has a median household income of $79,405. Approximately 8.1% of the county's population lives at or below the poverty line. Mercer County has an estimated 55.5% employment rate, with 22.6% of the population holding a bachelor's degree or higher and 90.4% holding a high school diploma.

The top five reported ancestries (people were allowed to report up to two ancestries, thus the figures will generally add to more than 100%) were English (93.7%), Spanish (1.1%), Indo-European (3.9%), Asian and Pacific Islander (0.5%), and Other (0.9%).

Mercer County, North Dakota – racial and ethnic composition
Note: the US Census treats Hispanic/Latino as an ethnic category. This table excludes Latinos from the racial categories and assigns them to a separate category. Hispanics/Latinos may be of any race.

Race / ethnicity (NH = non-Hispanic)	Pop. 1980	Pop. 1990	Pop. 2000	Pop. 2010	Pop. 2020
White alone (NH)	9,090 (96.66%)	9,493 (96.79%)	8,280 (95.79%)	7,996 (94.92%)	7,571 (90.67%)
Black or African American alone (NH)	10 (0.11%)	12 (0.12%)	4 (0.05%)	16 (0.19%)	42 (0.50%)
Native American or Alaska Native alone (NH)	207 (2.20%)	224 (2.28%)	172 (1.99%)	174 (2.07%)	193 (2.31%)
Asian alone (NH)	19 (0.20%)	36 (0.37%)	22 (0.25%)	27 (0.32%)	43 (0.51%)
Pacific Islander alone (NH)	—	—	33 (0.38%)	12 (0.14%)	1 (0.01%)
Other race alone (NH)	33 (0.35%)	1 (0.01%)	4 (0.05%)	0 (0.00%)	18 (0.22%)
Mixed race or multiracial (NH)	—	—	97 (1.12%)	78 (0.93%)	264 (3.16%)
Hispanic or Latino (any race)	45 (0.48%)	42 (0.43%)	32 (0.37%)	121 (1.44%)	218 (2.61%)
Total	9,404 (100.00%)	9,808 (100.00%)	8,644 (100.00%)	8,424 (100.00%)	8,350 (100.00%)

=== 2024 estimate ===
As of the 2024 estimate, there were 8,348 people and 3,594 households residing in the county. There were 4,685 housing units at an average density of 4.49 per square mile (1.7/km^{2}). The racial makeup of the county was 93.4% White (91.5% NH White), 0.6% African American, 3.0% Native American, 0.8% Asian, 0.1% Pacific Islander, _% from some other races and 2.1% from two or more races. Hispanic or Latino people of any race were 2.8% of the population.

=== 2020 census ===
As of the 2020 census, there were 8,350 people, 3,475 households, and 2,339 families residing in the county. Of the residents, 23.9% were under the age of 18 and 20.1% were 65 years of age or older; the median age was 43.9 years. For every 100 females there were 105.3 males, and for every 100 females age 18 and over there were 106.5 males.

The population density was 8.01 inhabitants per square mile (3.1/km^{2}). There were 4,657 housing units at an average density of 4.47 per square mile (1.7/km^{2}).

There were 3,475 households in the county, of which 27.2% had children under the age of 18 living with them and 17.2% had a female householder with no spouse or partner present. About 28.7% of all households were made up of individuals and 12.1% had someone living alone who was 65 years of age or older.

The racial makeup of the county was 91.3% White, 0.5% Black or African American, 2.4% American Indian and Alaska Native, 0.5% Asian, 0.9% from some other race, and 4.4% from two or more races. Hispanic or Latino residents of any race comprised 2.6% of the population.

Of the 4,657 housing units, 25.4% were vacant. Among occupied housing units, 82.8% were owner-occupied and 17.2% were renter-occupied. The homeowner vacancy rate was 2.3% and the rental vacancy rate was 35.1%.

=== 2010 census ===
As of the 2010 census, there were 8,424 people, 3,625 households, and 2,500 families residing in the county. The population density was 8.08 inhabitants per square mile (3.1/km^{2}). There were 4,450 housing units at an average density of 4.27 per square mile (1.6/km^{2}). The racial makeup of the county was 95.58% White, 0.20% African American, 2.33% Native American, 0.32% Asian, 0.14% Pacific Islander, 0.37% from some other races and 1.06% from two or more races. Hispanic or Latino people of any race were 1.44% of the population.

In terms of ancestry, 64.7% were German, 21.5% were Norwegian, 6.6% were Russian, 6.2% were Irish, and 2.2% were American.

There were 3,625 households, 26.5% had children under the age of 18 living with them, 60.1% were married couples living together, 5.0% had a female householder with no husband present, 31.0% were non-families, and 27.3% of all households were made up of individuals. The average household size was 2.29 and the average family size was 2.76. The median age was 46.3 years.

The median income for a household in the county was $60,191 and the median income for a family was $71,075. Males had a median income of $63,321 versus $32,294 for females. The per capita income for the county was $30,616. About 4.1% of families and 6.2% of the population were below the poverty line, including 7.2% of those under age 18 and 11.2% of those age 65 or over.

== Communities ==
=== Cities ===
- Beulah
- Golden Valley
- Hazen
- Pick City
- Stanton (county seat)
- Zap

=== Ghost towns ===
- Deapolis
- Expansion
- Krem
- Mannhaven
- Truax

== Politics ==
Mercer County voters have traditionally voted Republican. In no national election since 1936 has the county selected the Democratic Party candidate (as of 2024).

United States presidential election results for Mercer County, North Dakota
Year	Republican		Democratic		Third party(ies)	
Year	No.	%	No.	%	No.	%
1900	269	86.77%	41	13.23%	0	0.00%
1904	252	93.33%	17	6.30%	1	0.37%
1908	430	81.13%	96	18.11%	4	0.75%
1912	147	19.95%	142	19.27%	448	60.79%
1916	730	64.15%	353	31.02%	55	4.83%
1920	1,786	87.25%	172	8.40%	89	4.35%
1924	522	25.02%	70	3.36%	1,494	71.62%
1928	971	37.45%	1,619	62.44%	3	0.12%
1932	480	16.04%	2,491	83.23%	22	0.74%
1936	1,142	31.56%	1,924	53.16%	553	15.28%
1940	3,341	85.36%	567	14.49%	6	0.15%
1944	2,504	84.71%	445	15.05%	7	0.24%
1948	2,219	75.27%	643	21.81%	86	2.92%
1952	2,994	84.96%	512	14.53%	18	0.51%
1956	2,555	79.18%	666	20.64%	6	0.19%
1960	2,395	73.94%	844	26.06%	0	0.00%
1964	1,540	54.04%	1,310	45.96%	0	0.00%
1968	2,039	69.38%	730	24.84%	170	5.78%
1972	2,567	74.28%	784	22.69%	105	3.04%
1976	1,982	59.77%	1,298	39.14%	36	1.09%
1980	3,224	68.00%	1,209	25.50%	308	6.50%
1984	3,705	67.24%	1,729	31.38%	76	1.38%
1988	3,013	61.46%	1,843	37.60%	46	0.94%
1992	2,274	45.33%	1,323	26.37%	1,420	28.30%
1996	1,953	48.32%	1,300	32.16%	789	19.52%
2000	2,984	68.55%	1,011	23.23%	358	8.22%
2004	3,285	71.15%	1,245	26.97%	87	1.88%
2008	2,789	63.43%	1,476	33.57%	132	3.00%
2012	3,152	70.75%	1,166	26.17%	137	3.08%
2016	3,759	80.29%	621	13.26%	302	6.45%
2020	3,856	82.48%	704	15.06%	115	2.46%
2024	3,798	83.38%	672	14.75%	85	1.87%

== Education ==
School districts include:

- Beulah Public School District 27
- Center-Stanton Public School District 1
- Glen Ullin Public School District 48
- Halliday Public School District 19
- Hazen Public School District 3
- Hebron Public School District 13
- Underwood Public School District 8

Elementary:

- Twin Buttes Public School District 37

Stanton previously had a separate school district, but it merged with Center's in 2004.

Riverdale School District 89 had portions in Mercer County and in McLean County. The Associated Press described the district as "divided equally" between the counties. In 1993 members of the Riverdale School District school board voted to abolish their school district, with the Underwood and Hazen districts to obtain pieces of it.

Zap formerly had its own school district. In 1994 the district voted to dissolve.

== See also ==
- National Register of Historic Places listings in Mercer County, North Dakota
