= Hazen, North Dakota =

- City
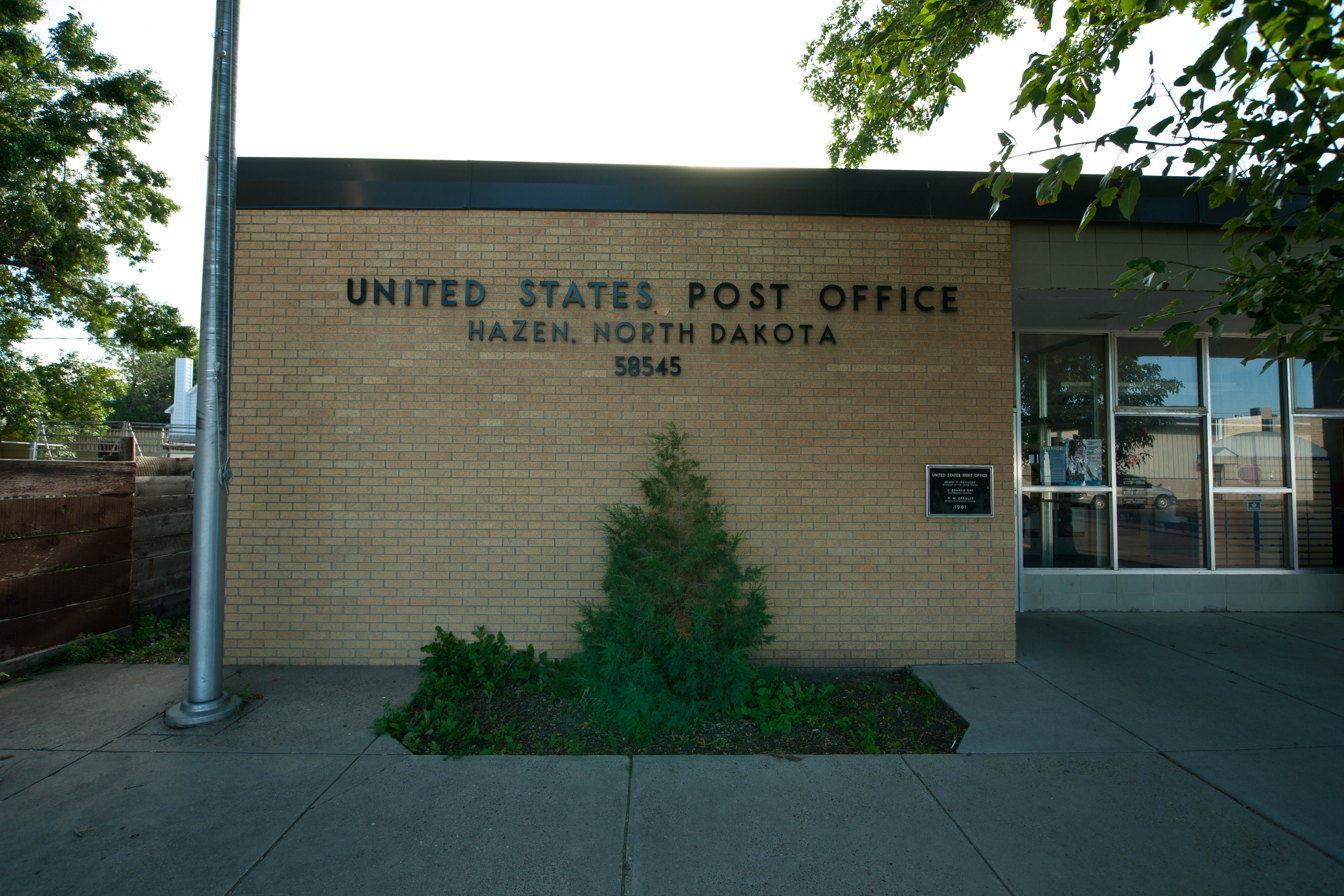
- Post office in Hazen

- Logo
- Motto: "The Heart of Sakakawea South Shore"
- Location of Hazen, North Dakota
- Coordinates: 47°17′56″N 101°37′33″W
- Country: United States
- State: North Dakota
- County: Mercer
- Founded: 1913

Government
  - Commission President: Jerry Obenauer

Area
  - Total: 1.41 sq mi (3.66 km^{2})
  - Land: 1.41 sq mi (3.65 km^{2})
  - Water: 0.0039 sq mi (0.01 km^{2})
- Elevation: 1,745 ft (532 m)

Population (2020)
  - Total: 2,281
  - Estimate (2022): 2,279
  - Density: 1,620.5/sq mi (625.68/km^{2})
- Time zone: UTC-6 (Central (CST))
  - Summer (DST): UTC-5 (CDT)
- ZIP code: 58545
- Area code: 701
- FIPS code: 38-36780
- GNIS feature ID: 1036089
- Highways: ND 200
- Website: hazennd.gov

Hazen is a city in Mercer County, North Dakota, United States. The population was 2,281 at the 2020 census. Hazen was founded in 1913. Hazen has a K–12 school system.

It is located about fifteen minutes south of Lake Sakakawea, the largest lake in North Dakota and the third largest man-made lake in the United States.

== History ==
A post office has been in operation at Hazen since 1885. A. D. Hazen, an early postmaster, gave the settlement its name. Hazen was laid out in 1913, when the railroad was extended to that point. The Fred Krause House, now on the National Register of Historic Places, was built in 1916.

== Geography ==
According to the United States Census Bureau, the city has a total area of 1.27 square miles (3.29 km^{2}), all land.

== Demographics ==
Historical population
| Census | Pop. | Note | %± |
|---|---|---|---|
| 1920 | 520 | | — |
| 1930 | 689 | | 32.5% |
| 1940 | 662 | | −3.9% |
| 1950 | 1,230 | | 85.8% |
| 1960 | 1,222 | | −0.7% |
| 1970 | 1,240 | | 1.5% |
| 1980 | 2,365 | | 90.7% |
| 1990 | 2,818 | | 19.2% |
| 2000 | 2,457 | | −12.8% |
| 2010 | 2,411 | | −1.9% |
| 2020 | 2,281 | | −5.4% |
| 2022 (est.) | 2,279 | | −0.1% |
U.S. Decennial Census; 2020 Census

=== 2020 census ===
As of the 2020 census, Hazen had a population of 2,281. The median age was 41.5 years. 24.0% of residents were under the age of 18 and 19.8% of residents were 65 years of age or older. For every 100 females there were 101.1 males, and for every 100 females age 18 and over there were 102.9 males age 18 and over.

0.0% of residents lived in urban areas, while 100.0% lived in rural areas.

There were 966 households in Hazen, of which 28.1% had children under the age of 18 living in them. Of all households, 55.7% were married-couple households, 19.0% were households with a male householder and no spouse or partner present, and 20.6% were households with a female householder and no spouse or partner present. About 29.3% of all households were made up of individuals and 12.3% had someone living alone who was 65 years of age or older.

There were 1,151 housing units, of which 16.1% were vacant. The homeowner vacancy rate was 1.7% and the rental vacancy rate was 31.0%.

Racial composition as of the 2020 census
| Race | Number | Percent |
|---|---|---|
| White | 2,110 | 92.5% |
| Black or African American | 7 | 0.3% |
| American Indian and Alaska Native | 44 | 1.9% |
| Asian | 14 | 0.6% |
| Native Hawaiian and Other Pacific Islander | 0 | 0.0% |
| Some other race | 22 | 1.0% |
| Two or more races | 84 | 3.7% |
| Hispanic or Latino (of any race) | 52 | 2.3% |

=== 2010 census ===
As of the census of 2010, there were 2,411 people, 1,020 households, and 742 families living in the city. The population density was 1,898.4 inhabitants per square mile (733.0/km^{2}). There were 1,074 housing units at an average density of 845.7 per square mile (326.5/km^{2}). The racial makeup of the city was 96.6% White, 0.4% African American, 1.8% Native American, 0.3% Asian, 0.1% Pacific Islander, 0.3% from other races, and 0.6% from two or more races. Hispanic or Latino of any race were 1.2% of the population.

There were 1,020 households, of which 29.0% had children under the age of 18 living with them, 63.1% were married couples living together, 6.5% had a female householder with no husband present, 3.1% had a male householder with no wife present, and 27.3% were non-families. 24.6% of all households were made up of individuals, and 9.1% had someone living alone who was 65 years of age or older. The average household size was 2.33 and the average family size was 2.75.

The median age in the city was 45.2 years. 22.6% of residents were under the age of 18; 5.2% were between the ages of 18 and 24; 21.9% were from 25 to 44; 35.8% were from 45 to 64; and 14.6% were 65 years of age or older. The gender makeup of the city was 50.1% male and 49.9% female.

=== 2000 census ===
As of the census of 2000, there were 2,457 people, 937 households, and 684 families living in the city. The population density was 1,981.6 inhabitants per square mile (765.1/km^{2}). There were 1,131 housing units at an average density of 912.2 per square mile (352.2/km^{2}). The racial makeup of the city was 97.07% White, 0.12% African American, 1.75% Native American, 0.28% Asian, 0.16% Pacific Islander, 0.08% from other races, and 0.53% from two or more races. Hispanic or Latino of any race were 0.37% of the population.

The top 6 ancestry groups in the city are German (71.7%), Norwegian (18.4%), Russian (9.4%), Irish (8.8%), English (6.0%), Swedish (4.0%).

There were 937 households, out of which 39.1% had children under the age of 18 living with them, 67.1% were married couples living together, 4.8% had a female householder with no husband present, and 26.9% were non-families. 25.0% of all households were made up of individuals, and 11.4% had someone living alone who was 65 years of age or older. The average household size was 2.58 and the average family size was 3.12.

In the city, the population was spread out, with 30.0% under the age of 18, 4.1% from 18 to 24, 27.9% from 25 to 44, 24.9% from 45 to 64, and 13.0% who were 65 years of age or older. The median age was 40 years. For every 100 females, there were 97.8 males. For every 100 females age 18 and over, there were 95.6 males.

The median income for a household in the city was $44,028, and the median income for a family was $55,859. Males had a median income of $46,792 versus $23,011 for females. The per capita income for the city was $18,908. About 2.8% of families and 5.9% of the population were below the poverty line, including 3.1% of those under age 18 and 22.7% of those age 65 or over.

== Education ==
Hazen High School

== Transportation ==
Hazen Busing provides dial-a-ride transit service in the city. The service operates on weekdays from 8am to 4pm.

== Notable natives ==
- Tigirlily Gold, musical duo
- Eldon W. Joersz, American pilot
