= Stanton, North Dakota =

City in North Dakota, United States

- City
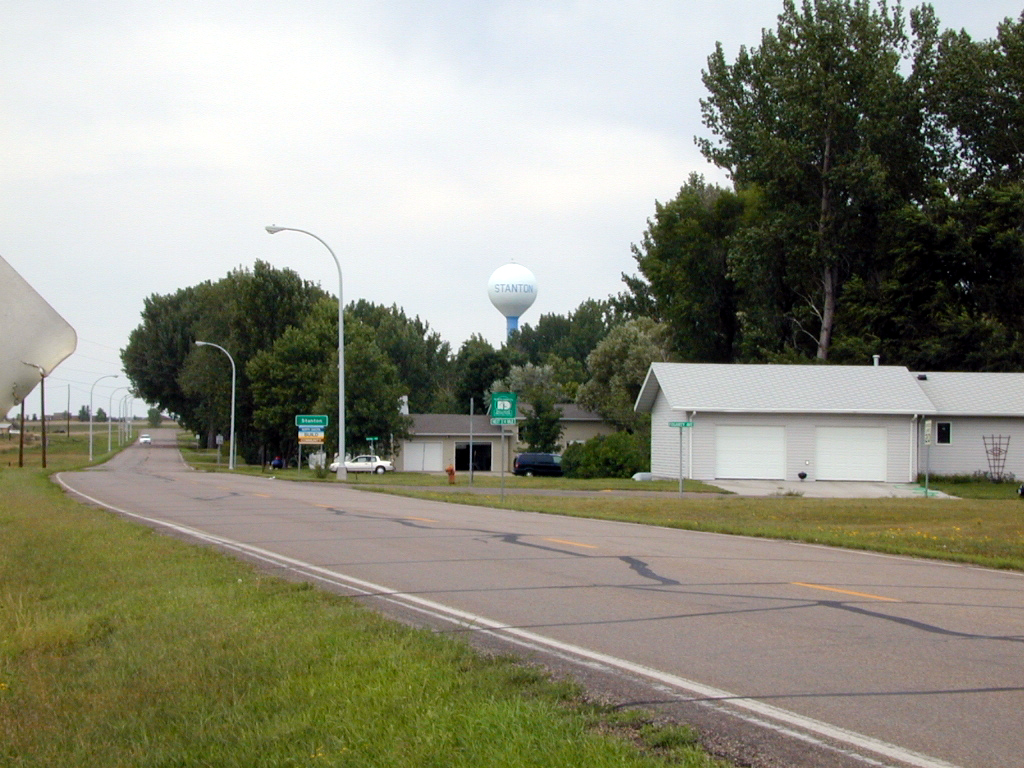
- Stanton, North Dakota

- Location of Stanton, North Dakota
- Coordinates: 47°19′07″N 101°22′56″W
- Country: United States
- State: North Dakota
- County: Mercer
- Founded: 1883

Area
  - Total: 0.36 sq mi (0.92 km^{2})
  - Land: 0.36 sq mi (0.92 km^{2})
  - Water: 0 sq mi (0.00 km^{2})
- Elevation: 1,703 ft (519 m)

Population (2020)
  - Total: 368
  - Estimate (2022): 364
  - Density: 1,035.5/sq mi (399.81/km^{2})
- Time zone: UTC-6 (Central (CST))
  - Summer (DST): UTC-5 (CDT)
- ZIP code: 58571
- Area code: 701
- FIPS code: 38-75420
- GNIS feature ID: 1036285
- Website: www.stantonnd.com

Stanton is a city in Mercer County, North Dakota, United States. It is the county seat of Mercer County. The population was 368 at the 2020 census. Stanton was founded in 1883 and became the county seat when Mercer County organized in 1884.

Stanton is home to the Knife River Indian Villages National Historic Site, which houses a Hidatsa earth lodge and three abandoned villages. One of these, Awatixa, is believed to be the former home of Sakakawea.

== Geography ==
According to the United States Census Bureau, the city has a total area of 0.47 square miles (1.22 km^{2}), all land.

== Demographics ==
Historical population
Census	Pop.	Note	%±
1920	325		—
1930	358		10.2%
1940	370		3.4%
1950	571		54.3%
1960	409		−28.4%
1970	517		26.4%
1980	623		20.5%
1990	517		−17.0%
2000	345		−33.3%
2010	366		6.1%
2020	368		0.5%
2022 (est.)	364		−1.1%
U.S. Decennial Census; 2020 Census

=== 2010 census ===
As of the census of 2010, there were 366 people, 166 households, and 113 families residing in the city. The population density was 778.7 inhabitants per square mile (300.7/km^{2}). There were 198 housing units at an average density of 421.3 per square mile (162.7/km^{2}). The racial makeup of the city was 97.3% White, 0.3% Native American, 0.3% Asian, and 2.2% from two or more races. Hispanic or Latino of any race were 0.3% of the population.

There were 166 households, of which 22.9% had children under the age of 18 living with them, 55.4% were married couples living together, 6.6% had a female householder with no husband present, 6.0% had a male householder with no wife present, and 31.9% were non-families. 28.9% of all households were made up of individuals, and 8.4% had someone living alone who was 65 years of age or older. The average household size was 2.17 and the average family size was 2.59.

The median age in the city was 48.5 years. 18% of residents were under the age of 18; 6.3% were between the ages of 18 and 24; 20.2% were from 25 to 44; 37.7% were from 45 to 64; and 17.8% were 65 years of age or older. The gender makeup of the city was 51.1% male and 48.9% female.

=== 2000 census ===
As of the census of 2000, there were 345 people, 159 households, and 107 families residing in the city. The population density was 739.9 inhabitants per square mile (285.7/km^{2}). There were 198 housing units at an average density of 424.7 per square mile (164.0/km^{2}). The racial makeup of the city was 95.65% White, 1.74% Native American, 0.58% Asian, 0.29% Pacific Islander, 0.29% from other races, and 1.45% from two or more races. Hispanic or Latino of any race were 0.29% of the population.

There were 159 households, out of which 23.3% had children under the age of 18 living with them, 59.1% were married couples living together, 3.8% had a female householder with no husband present, and 32.7% were non-families. 30.2% of all households were made up of individuals, and 13.8% had someone living alone who was 65 years of age or older. The average household size was 2.13 and the average family size was 2.58.

In the city, the population was spread out, with 20.9% under the age of 18, 4.6% from 18 to 24, 21.2% from 25 to 44, 35.1% from 45 to 64, and 18.3% who were 65 years of age or older. The median age was 46 years. For every 100 females, there were 106.6 males. For every 100 females age 18 and over, there were 111.6 males.

The median income for a household in the city was $38,958, and the median income for a family was $49,750. Males had a median income of $46,000 versus $24,688 for females. The per capita income for the city was $17,983. About 0.9% of families and 5.4% of the population were below the poverty line, including 4.6% of those under age 18 and 13.5% of those age 65 or over.

== Education ==
It is in the Center-Stanton School District. The district formed in July 2004 from the merger of the Center and Stanton school districts. As a result of the merger Stanton High School immediately closed, and Stanton elementary closed in 2008. All students go to school in Center.
