= Center, North Dakota =

- City
- Logo
- Nickname: Center of North America
- Location of Center, North Dakota
- Coordinates: 47°06′54″N 101°17′52″W
- Country: United States
- State: North Dakota
- County: Oliver
- Founded: 1902

Area
  - Total: 0.48 sq mi (1.24 km^{2})
  - Land: 0.48 sq mi (1.24 km^{2})
  - Water: 0 sq mi (0.00 km^{2})
- Elevation: 1,972 ft (601 m)

Population (2020)
  - Total: 588
  - Estimate (2022): 579
  - Density: 1,229.2/sq mi (474.59/km^{2})
- Time zone: UTC-6 (Central (CST))
  - Summer (DST): UTC-5 (CDT)
- ZIP Code: 58530
- Area code: 701
- FIPS code: 38-13180
- GNIS feature ID: 1035961
- Website: centernd.net

Center is a city in Oliver County, North Dakota, United States. It is the county seat of, and the only incorporated place in Oliver County. The population was 588 at the 2020 census. Center along with Oliver County is included in the Bismarck metropolitan area.

== History ==
Center was founded in 1902. The city was named from its location near the geographical center of Oliver County. Coincidentally, it has also been calculated to be the geographical center of North America.

The town is somewhat notable for the blizzard-related death of Hazel Miner, who would go on to be the subject of a song and memorials.

== Geography ==
According to the United States Census Bureau, the city has a total area of 0.46 square miles (1.19 km^{2}), all land.

Southwest of Center, there is a large open air coal mine. Southeast of Center, at Nelson Lake there is a large power plant. West of Nelson Lake is situated the Square Butte high-voltage direct current transmission line's static inverter.

=== Center of North America ===
Peter Rogerson, a professor of geography at the University at Buffalo in New York, used new scientific methods and the azimuthal equidistant projection to calculate the "geographic center" of the North American continent. By some extraordinary coincidence, he found that Center, North Dakota, is the continent's geographical center.

=== Climate ===
This climatic region is typified by large seasonal temperature differences, with warm to hot (and often humid) summers and cold (sometimes severely cold) winters. According to the Köppen Climate Classification system, Center has a humid continental climate, abbreviated "Dfb" on climate maps.

Climate data for Center 4SE, North Dakota (1991–2020 normals, extremes 1938–present)
Month	Jan	Feb	Mar	Apr	May	Jun	Jul	Aug	Sep	Oct	Nov	Dec	Year
Record high °F (°C)	61 (16)	68 (20)	80 (27)	94 (34)	96 (36)	108 (42)	107 (42)	110 (43)	104 (40)	96 (36)	82 (28)	65 (18)	110 (43)
Mean daily maximum °F (°C)	22.9 (−5.1)	26.8 (−2.9)	39.2 (4.0)	53.9 (12.2)	65.8 (18.8)	75.1 (23.9)	81.6 (27.6)	81.0 (27.2)	70.8 (21.6)	54.7 (12.6)	38.4 (3.6)	26.4 (−3.1)	53.1 (11.7)
Daily mean °F (°C)	13.7 (−10.2)	17.8 (−7.9)	29.4 (−1.4)	43.4 (6.3)	54.5 (12.5)	64.2 (17.9)	69.7 (20.9)	68.3 (20.2)	58.6 (14.8)	44.1 (6.7)	29.0 (−1.7)	17.9 (−7.8)	42.6 (5.9)
Mean daily minimum °F (°C)	4.6 (−15.2)	8.9 (−12.8)	19.6 (−6.9)	32.8 (0.4)	43.3 (6.3)	53.3 (11.8)	57.8 (14.3)	55.7 (13.2)	46.4 (8.0)	33.5 (0.8)	19.5 (−6.9)	9.4 (−12.6)	32.1 (0.1)
Record low °F (°C)	−42 (−41)	−40 (−40)	−30 (−34)	−11 (−24)	10 (−12)	26 (−3)	35 (2)	31 (−1)	10 (−12)	−3 (−19)	−25 (−32)	−40 (−40)	−42 (−41)
Average precipitation inches (mm)	0.51 (13)	0.51 (13)	0.85 (22)	1.41 (36)	2.78 (71)	3.46 (88)	2.77 (70)	2.01 (51)	2.08 (53)	1.40 (36)	0.66 (17)	0.51 (13)	18.95 (481)
Source: NOAA

== Demographics ==
Historical population
Census	Pop.	Note	%±
1930	293		—
1940	509		73.7%
1950	492		−3.3%
1960	476		−3.3%
1970	619		30.0%
1980	900		45.4%
1990	826		−8.2%
2000	678		−17.9%
2010	571		−15.8%
2020	588		3.0%
2022 (est.)	579		−1.5%
U.S. Decennial Census; 2020 Census

=== 2010 census ===
As of the census of 2010, there were 571 people, 252 households, and 169 families living in the city. The population density was 1,241.3 inhabitants per square mile (479.3/km^{2}). There were 310 housing units at an average density of 673.9 per square mile (260.2/km^{2}). The racial makeup of the city was 96.0% White, 0.5% African American, 3.2% Native American, and 0.4% from two or more races. Hispanic or Latino of any race were 1.9% of the population.

There were 252 households, of which 20.6% had children under the age of 18 living with them, 57.5% were married couples living together, 7.5% had a female householder with no husband present, 2.0% had a male householder with no wife present, and 32.9% were non-families. 27.8% of all households were made up of individuals, and 13.1% had someone living alone who was 65 years of age or older. The average household size was 2.26 and the average family size was 2.71.

The median age in the city was 49.3 years. 19.1% of residents were under the age of 18; 5.7% were between the ages of 18 and 24; 18.4% were from 25 to 44; 40% were from 45 to 64; and 17% were 65 years of age or older. The gender makeup of the city was 51.3% male and 48.7% female.

=== 2000 census ===
As of the census of 2000, there were 678 people, 279 households, and 196 families living in the city. The population density was 1,743.8 inhabitants per square mile (673.3/km^{2}). There were 310 housing units at an average density of 797.3 per square mile (307.8/km^{2}). The racial makeup of the city was 93.81% White, 0.44% African American, 3.39% Native American, and 2.36% from two or more races. Hispanic or Latino of any race were 0.59% of the population.

There were 279 households, out of which 33.3% had children under the age of 18 living with them, 62.0% were married couples living together, 5.7% had a female householder with no husband present, and 29.4% were non-families. 26.2% of all households were made up of individuals, and 16.5% had someone living alone who was 65 years of age or older. The average household size was 2.43 and the average family size was 2.93.

In the city, the population was spread out, with 24.6% under the age of 18, 5.8% from 18 to 24, 22.6% from 25 to 44, 33.0% from 45 to 64, and 14.0% who were 65 years of age or older. The median age was 44 years. For every 100 females, there were 96.0 males. For every 100 females age 18 and over, there were 92.8 males.

The median income for a household in the city was $41,406, and the median income for a family was $57,045. Males had a median income of $54,750 versus $18,393 for females. The per capita income for the city was $20,043. About 2.1% of families and 7.6% of the population were below the poverty line, including 9.9% of those under age 18 and 17.8% of those age 65 or over.

== Education ==
It is in the Center-Stanton School District. The district formed in July 2004 from the merger of the Center and Stanton school districts.
