= North Dakota Highway 200 =

State highway in North Dakota, U.S.

North Dakota Highway 200
- ND 200 highlighted in red

Route information
- Maintained by NDDOT
- Length: 415.778 mi (669.130 km)
- Tourist routes: Lewis and Clark Trail

Major junctions
- West end: MT 200 near Fairview, MT
- US 85 from near Alexander to near Grassy Butte; US 83 / ND 1804 from near Coleharbor to Underwood; US 52 near Bowdon; US 52 / US 281 in Carrington; I-29 / US 81 near Cummings
- East end: MN 200 near Halstad, MN

Location
- Country: United States
- State: North Dakota
- Counties: McKenzie, Dunn, Mercer, McLean, Sheridan, Wells, Foster, Griggs, Steele, Traill

Highway system
- North Dakota State Highway System; Interstate; US; State
← ND 127	→ ND 200A

North Dakota Highway 200 (ND 200) is a major east to west state highway in North Dakota, United States. It runs from Minnesota State Highway 200 at the Minnesota border near Halstad, Minnesota to Montana Highway 200 near Fairview, Montana. At nearly 416 miles (669 km), it is the longest state highway in North Dakota.

This highway was originally numbered North Dakota Highway 7, but was renumbered to form a continuous chain of similarly numbered state highways that stretch approximately 1,356 miles (2,182 km) long from Minnesota to Idaho.

== Route description ==
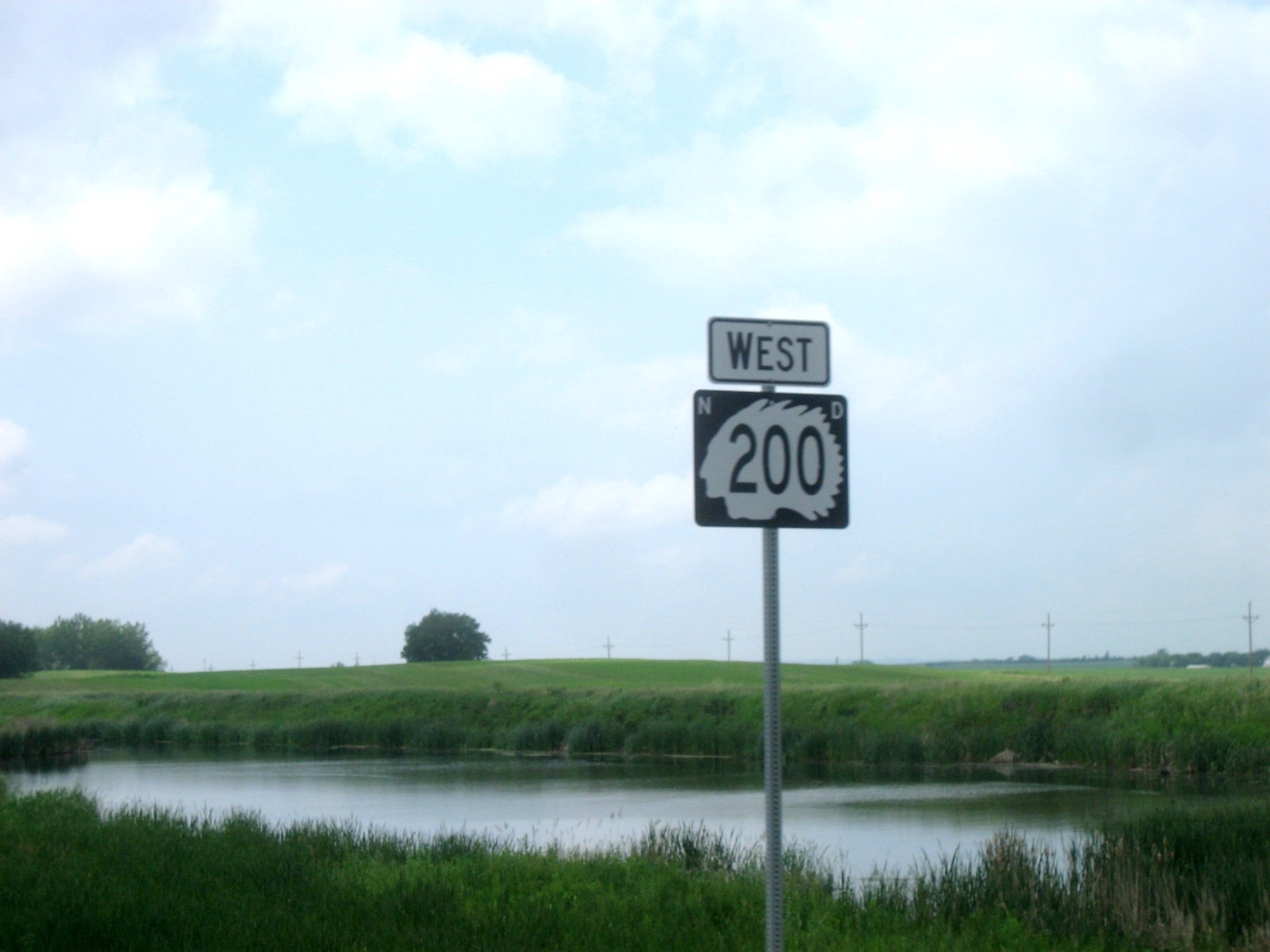
Old-style Highway 200 reassurance shield in Sheridan County

ND 200 enters North Dakota from Montana (where it is also MT 200) in East Fairview, where it has a junction with ND 58 at a roundabout. It heads east past the ghost towns of Charbonneau and Cartwright, then intersects US 85 near Alexander. It then follows US 85 south. It turns east at the junction with ND 68, going towards Watford City. At Watford City it meets ND 23, US 85 Bus., and ND 23 Bus. After this, US 85/ND 200 heads south past the Theodore Roosevelt National Park (North Unit). After the small town of Grassy Butte, ND 200 turns east towards Killdeer, North Dakota, while US 85 heads south to I-94 and Belfield. West of Belfield on I-94 you can access the Theodore Roosevelt National Park (South Unit) near Medora. At Killdeer, ND 200 junctions with ND 22 and ND 22 Bus. at roundabouts. It then passes Lake Ilo near Dunn Center, North Dakota and intersects ND 8 near Halliday. It passes Dodge, Golden Valley and Zap before intersecting ND 49/CR 21 north of Beulah, the largest city in Mercer County at another roundabout. Next it passes the city of Hazen. East of Hazen, it junctions with ND 200 Alt. and turns north towards Lake Sakakawea, while ND 200 Alt. heads east towards Stanton and Washburn. Near the lake it meets with ND 1806 southwest of Pick City. East of Pick City, it crosses the Garrison Dam and heads toward the city of Riverdale. It passes the junction with ND 48 before meeting with US 83/ND 1804 north of Underwood. ND 200 follows US 83 to Underwood, where it turns east towards Turtle Lake, and a junction with ND 41 north. ND 41 south joins ND 200 until the city of Mercer, where ND 41 turns south towards Wilton. It then passes Pickardville and McClusky. At Denhoff, it meets with ND 14. ND 200 turns south and then east near the city of Goodrich. It junctions with ND 3 near Hurdsfield, and then US 52 near Bowdon. US 52 follows ND 200 east past ND 30 and heads to Carrington, where it meets US 281 at a roundabout. ND 200 stays east, while US 52 follows US 281 to Jamestown and I-94. ND 200 intersects ND 20 in Glenfield and ND 1 west of Cooperstown. In the city of Cooperstown it has a junction with ND 45. It meets with ND 32 near Finley. It follows ND 32 into town, then turns east again. It meets ND 18 near Portland and follows ND 18 to the city of Mayville. ND 18 turns south here and ND 200 continues east to I-29/US 81 near Cummings. After I-29, ND 200 turns south towards the city of Hillsboro. Near the Hillsboro Municipal Airport south of town, ND 200 intersects ND 200A and turns east and heads toward Minnesota and crosses the Red River of the North near the city of Halstad, where it continues as MN 200.

On August 1, 2025, ND Highway 200 was named the North Dakota Fallen Peace officers Memorial Highway. The highway was marked as such and the law provides for one mile of the highway to be dedicated to an individual fallen officer or law enforcement canine.

== Major intersections ==
County	Location	mi	km	Destinations	Notes
McKenzie	East Fairview	0.000	0.000	MT 200 west – Fairview, Sidney Lewis and Clark Trail ends	Continuation into Montana; western end of LCT concurrency
McKenzie	East Fairview	0.378	0.608	ND 58 north / Lewis and Clark Trail / 161st Avenue NW – Williston	Southern terminus of ND 58
McKenzie		18.684	30.069	US 85 north – Williston	Western end of US 85 concurrency
McKenzie		19.602	31.546	US 85 Bus. south – Alexander	Northern terminus of US 85 Bus.
McKenzie	Alex Township	22.603	36.376	US 85 Bus. north – Alexander	Southern terminus of US 85 Bus.
McKenzie	Alex Township	23.764	38.244	ND 68 west – Sidney	Eastern terminus of ND 68
McKenzie		37.449	60.268	US 85 Bus. south / Lewis and Clark Trail east – Watford City	Eastern end of LCT concurrency; northern terminus of US 85 Bus.
McKenzie		42.277	68.038	US 85 Bus. north / ND 23 east – Watford City, New Town	Southern terminus of US 85 Bus., western terminus of ND 23
McKenzie		75.083	120.834	US 85 south – Belfield	Eastern end of US 85 concurrency
Dunn	Unorganized Territory of Killdeer	93.247	150.066	ND 22 north	Western end of ND 22 concurrency
Dunn	Killdeer	95.254	153.296	ND 22 south / ND 22 Bus. north / Lewis and Clark Trail / Killdeer Mountain Four Bears Scenic Byway – New Town, Manning, Dickinson	Eastern end of ND 22 concurrency, southern terminus of ND 22B
Dunn		115.351	185.639	ND 8 north / Lewis and Clark Trail – Halliday	Western end of ND 8 concurrency
Dunn	Unorganized Territory of Halliday	117.262	188.715	ND 8 south – Marshall, Richardton	Eastern end of ND 8 concurrency
Mercer		143.511	230.959	ND 49 south / CR 21 north – Beulah	Northern terminus of ND 49
Mercer		157.781	253.924	ND 200A east / Lewis and Clark Trail – Stanton, Washburn	Western terminus of ND 200A
Mercer		169.952	273.511	ND 1806 west / Lewis and Clark Trail (4 Street NW)	Eastern terminus of ND 1806
Lake Sakakawea				Garrison Dam	
McLean	Victoria–Longfellow township line	186.397	299.977	ND 48 north / CR 19 south	Southern terminus of ND 48
McLean	Longfellow Township	188.892	303.992	US 83 north / Lewis and Clark Trail north (ND 1804 north) – Coleharbor, Minot	Western end of US 83/ND 1804/LCT concurrency
McLean		192.873	310.399	US 83 south / Lewis and Clark Trail south (ND 1804 south) – Washburn	Eastern end of US 83/ND 1804/LCT concurrency
McLean		197.047	317.116	ND 200A west – Washburn	Eastern terminus of ND 200A
McLean		205.797	331.198	ND 41 north – Turtle Lake	Western end of ND 41 concurrency
McLean	Mercer	213.797	344.073	ND 41 south – Wilton, Bismarck	Eastern end of ND 41 concurrency
Sheridan	McClusky	236.225	380.167	ND 14 – Wing, Anamoose	
Wells	Bull Moose Township	252.062	405.654	ND 3 south – Tuttle, Steele	Western end of ND 3 concurrency
Wells	Hurdsfield	254.202	409.098	ND 3 north – Harvey	Eastern end of ND 3 concurrency
Wells	Speedwell Township	268.577	432.233	US 52 west / CR 71	Western end of US 52 concurrency
Wells	Sykeston Township	278.580	448.331	ND 30 north – Cathay	Southern terminus of ND 30
Foster	Carrington	293.491	472.328	US 52 east / US 281 – Jamestown, New Rockford	Eastern end of US 52 concurrency
Foster	Glenfield	319.423	514.061	ND 20 – Jamestown, Devils Lake	
Griggs	Clearfield Township	330.806	532.381	ND 1 north – Binford	Western end of ND 1 concurrency
Griggs	Cooperstown Township	337.913	543.818	ND 1 south – Hannaford	Eastern end of ND 1 concurrency
Griggs	Cooperstown	340.504	547.988	ND 45 north – Cooperstown	Southern terminus of ND 45
Steele	Easton Township	354.115	569.893	ND 32 south / CR 11 – Oriska	Western end of ND 32 concurrency
Steele	Finley	359.041	577.820	ND 32 north / CR 18 – Sharon, Aneta	Eastern end of ND 32 concurrency
Traill	Viking Township	377.411	607.384	ND 18 north – Hatton	Western end of ND 18 concurrency
Traill	Mayville	384.404	618.638	ND 18 south – Casselton	Eastern end of ND 18 concurrency
Traill	Ervin–Eldorado township line	395.560	636.592	I-29 / US 81 – Grand Forks, Fargo	I-29 exit 111
Traill	Hillsboro			CR 11 west (Caledonia Avenue) to I-29	Western end of CR 11 concurrency
Traill	Hillsboro Township			CR 11 east	Eastern end of CR 11 concurrency
Traill	Alton	406.526	654.240	ND 200A west / CR 81 – Kelso	Eastern terminus of ND 200A; CR 81 is former US 81 south
Red River		415.778	669.130	North Dakota–Minnesota line	
Red River		415.778	669.130	MN 200 east – Halstad	Continuation into Minnesota
1.000 mi = 1.609 km; 1.000 km = 0.621 mi: Concurrency terminus

== See also ==
- List of state highways in North Dakota
- List of highways numbered 200
