= North Dakota Highway 65 =

State highway in North Dakota, U.S.

North Dakota Highway 65

Route information
- Maintained by NDDOT
- Length: 9.383 mi (15.100 km)
- Existed: c. 1937–present

Major junctions
- West end: ND 1 east of Binford
- East end: ND 45 north of Cooperstown

Location
- Country: United States
- State: North Dakota
- Counties: Griggs

Highway system
- North Dakota State Highway System; Interstate; US; State
← ND 60	→ ND 66

North Dakota Highway 65 (ND 65) is a 9.383-mile-long (15.100 km) east–west state highway in the U.S. state of North Dakota. ND 65's western terminus is at ND 1 east of Binford, and the eastern terminus is at ND 45 north of Cooperstown.

== Major intersections ==
The entire route is in Griggs County.

Location	mi	km	Destinations	Notes
	0.000	0.000	ND 1 – Lakota, ND 200; CR 8 – Binford	Western terminus
	9.383	15.100	ND 45 – Cooperstown, Sharon, Aneta	Eastern terminus
1.000 mi = 1.609 km; 1.000 km = 0.621 mi
