= North Dakota Highway 45 =

State highway in North Dakota, U.S.

North Dakota Highway 45

Route information
- Maintained by NDDOT
- Length: 18.048 mi (29.045 km)
- Existed: c. 1927–present

Major junctions
- South end: ND 200 in Cooperstown
- North end: ND 32 west of Sharon

Location
- Country: United States
- State: North Dakota
- Counties: Griggs, Steele

Highway system
- North Dakota State Highway System; Interstate; US; State
← ND 44	→ ND 46

North Dakota Highway 45 (ND 45) is an 18.048-mile-long (29.045 km) north–south state highway in the U.S. state of North Dakota. ND 45's southern terminus is at ND 200 in Cooperstown, and the northern terminus is at ND 32 west of Sharon.

== Major intersections ==
County	Location	mi	km	Destinations	Notes
Griggs	Cooperstown	0.000	0.000	ND 200 – Hannaford, Carrington, Finley	Southern terminus
Griggs		7.385	11.885	ND 65 west – Jessie	Eastern terminus of ND 65
Griggs–Steele county line		18.048	29.045	ND 32 – Sharon, Finley, Aneta	Northern terminus; roadway continues east as ND 32
1.000 mi = 1.609 km; 1.000 km = 0.621 mi
