= Helena Township =

Helena Township may refer to:

- Helena Township, Michigan
- Helena Township, Scott County, Minnesota
- Helena Township, Griggs County, North Dakota, in Griggs County, North Dakota
