= Addie Township, Griggs County, North Dakota =

Addie Township, North Dakota
- Township
- Location within the state of North Dakota
- Coordinates: 47°32′38″N 98°17′24″W
- Country: United States
- State: North Dakota
- County: Griggs County
- Township: Addie Township

Area
  - Total: 33.27 sq mi (86.2 km^{2})
- Elevation: 1,510 ft (460 m)

Population (2020)
  - Total: 48
  - Density: 1.9/sq mi (0.73/km^{2})
- Time zone: UTC-6 (Central (CST))
  - Summer (DST): UTC-5 (CDT)
- Postal Code(s): 58416 & 58425
- Area code: 701
- GNIS feature ID: 1036653
- Census Code: 00420
- Census Class Code: T1
- Website: Griggs County

Historical population
Census	Pop.	Note	%±
1890	63		—
1900	204		223.8%
1910	181		−11.3%
1920	245		35.4%
1930	210		−14.3%
1940	155		−26.2%
1950	136		−12.3%
1960	128		−5.9%
1970	88		−31.2%
1980	85		−3.4%
1990	70		−17.6%
2000	53		−24.3%
2010	64		20.8%
2020	48		−25.0%

Addie Township is a township in Griggs County, North Dakota, United States.

== History ==
The first caravan of white settlers arrived in 1882. Among these were the Gilbert P. Olson, John Paulson and Ole K. Olson families.

== Demographics ==
Its population during the 2020 census was 48, down from was 64 in 2010.

== Location within Griggs County ==
Addie Township is located in Township 147 Range 60 west of the Fifth principal meridian.

	Range 61	Range 60	Range 59	Range 58
Township 148	Rosendal	Willow	Pilot Mound	Lenora
Township 147	Bryan	Addie	Tyrol	Romness
Township 146	Kingsley	Clearfield	Cooperstown	Washburn
Township 145	Mabel	Helena	Ball Hill	Sverdrup
Township 144	Dover	Bartley	Greenfield	Broadview
