= Bryan Township, Griggs County, North Dakota =

Bryan Township, North Dakota
- Township
- Location within the state of North Dakota
- Coordinates: 47°32′38″N 98°26′09″W
- Country: United States
- State: North Dakota
- County: Griggs County
- Township: Bryan Township

Area
  - Total: 35.95 sq mi (93.1 km^{2})
- Elevation: 1,499 ft (457 m)

Population (2010)
  - Total: 39
  - Density: 1.0/sq mi (0.4/km^{2})
- Time zone: UTC-6 (Central (CST))
  - Summer (DST): UTC-5 (CDT)
- Postal Code(s): 58416 & 58464
- Area code: 701
- GNIS feature ID: 1036655
- Census Code: 09940
- Census Class Code: T1
- Website: Griggs County

Historical population
Census	Pop.	Note	%±
1890	60		—
1900	127		111.7%
1910	184		44.9%
1920	274		48.9%
1930	254		−7.3%
1940	190		−25.2%
1950	148		−22.1%
1960	136		−8.1%
1970	91		−33.1%
1980	63		−30.8%
1990	70		11.1%
2000	63		−10.0%
2010	39		−38.1%
2018 (est.)	37		−5.1%

Bryan Township is a township in Griggs County, North Dakota, United States.

== History ==
Twenty two persons submitted a petition for the incorporation of Township 147 Range 61 on August 13, 1900, and the County Commission ordered an election to be held on September 4, 1900, to elect officers. Ole Bakken suggested the township be named after William Jennings Bryan.

== Demographics ==
Its population during the 2010 census was 39.

== Location within Griggs County ==
Bryan Township is located in Township 147 Range 61 west of the Fifth principal meridian.

	Range 61	Range 60	Range 59	Range 58
Township 148	Rosendal	Willow	Pilot Mound	Lenora
Township 147	Bryan	Addie	Tyrol	Romness
Township 146	Kingsley	Clearfield	Cooperstown	Washburn
Township 145	Mabel	Helena	Ball Hill	Sverdrup
Township 144	Dover	Bartley	Greenfield	Broadview
