= Washburn Township, Griggs County, North Dakota =

Washburn Township, North Dakota
- Township
- Location within the state of North Dakota
- Coordinates: 47°27′24″N 98°02′58″W
- Country: United States
- State: North Dakota
- County: Griggs County
- Township: Washburn Township

Area
  - Total: 35.86 sq mi (92.9 km^{2})
- Elevation: 1,440 ft (439 m)

Population (2010)
  - Total: 68
  - Density: 1.8/sq mi (0.7/km^{2})
- Time zone: UTC-6 (Central (CST))
  - Summer (DST): UTC-5 (CDT)
- Postal Code(s): 58425
- Area code: 701
- GNIS feature ID: 1036642
- Census Code: 83660
- Census Class Code: T1
- Website: Griggs County

Historical population
Census	Pop.	Note	%±
1890	134		—
1900	250		86.6%
1910	268		7.2%
1920	267		−0.4%
1930	243		−9.0%
1940	218		−10.3%
1950	175		−19.7%
1960	137		−21.7%
1970	150		9.5%
1980	90		−40.0%
1990	67		−25.6%
2000	73		9.0%
2010	68		−6.8%
2018 (est.)	62		−8.8%

Washburn Township is a township in Griggs County, North Dakota, United States.

== Demographics ==
Its population during the 2010 census was 68.

== Location within Griggs County ==
Washburn Township is located in Township 146 Range 58 west of the Fifth principal meridian.

	Range 61	Range 60	Range 59	Range 58
Township 148	Rosendal	Willow	Pilot Mound	Lenora
Township 147	Bryan	Addie	Tyrol	Romness
Township 146	Kingsley	Clearfield	Cooperstown	Washburn
Township 145	Mabel	Helena	Ball Hill	Sverdrup
Township 144	Dover	Bartley	Greenfield	Broadview
