= Romness Township, Griggs County, North Dakota =

Romness Township, North Dakota
- Township
- Location within the state of North Dakota
- Coordinates: 47°32′36″N 98°02′55″W
- Country: United States
- State: North Dakota
- County: Griggs County
- Township: Romness Township

Area
  - Total: 36.06 sq mi (93.4 km^{2})
- Elevation: 1,306 ft (398 m)

Population (2010)
  - Total: 60
  - Density: 1.0/sq mi (0.4/km^{2})
- Time zone: UTC-6 (Central (CST))
  - Summer (DST): UTC-5 (CDT)
- Postal Code(s): 58212 & 58425
- Area code: 701
- GNIS feature ID: 1036647
- Census Code: 67980
- Census Class Code: T1
- Website: Griggs County

Historical population
| Census | Pop. | Note | %± |
|---|---|---|---|
| 1890 | 185 | | — |
| 1900 | 266 | | 43.8% |
| 1910 | 267 | | 0.4% |
| 1920 | 277 | | 3.7% |
| 1930 | 267 | | −3.6% |
| 1940 | 189 | | −29.2% |
| 1950 | 188 | | −0.5% |
| 1960 | 151 | | −19.7% |
| 1970 | 96 | | −36.4% |
| 1980 | 73 | | −24.0% |
| 1990 | 50 | | −31.5% |
| 2000 | 50 | | 0.0% |
| 2010 | 36 | | −28.0% |
| 2018 (est.) | 35 | | −2.8% |

Romness Township is a township in Griggs County, North Dakota, United States.

== Demographics ==
Its population during the 2010 census was 60.

== Location within Griggs County ==
Romness Township is located in Township 147 Range 58 west of the Fifth principal meridian.

| | Range 61 | Range 60 | Range 59 | Range 58 |
| Township 148 | Rosendal | Willow | Pilot Mound | Lenora |
| Township 147 | Bryan | Addie | Tyrol | Romness |
| Township 146 | Kingsley | Clearfield | Cooperstown | Washburn |
| Township 145 | Mabel | Helena | Ball Hill | Sverdrup |
| Township 144 | Dover | Bartley | Greenfield | Broadview |
