= Kingsley Township, Griggs County, North Dakota =

Kingsley Township, North Dakota
- Township
- Location within the state of North Dakota
- Coordinates: 47°27′25″N 98°26′09″W
- Country: United States
- State: North Dakota
- County: Griggs County
- Township: Kingsley Township

Area
  - Total: 36.04 sq mi (93.3 km^{2})
- Elevation: 1,453 ft (443 m)

Population (2010)
  - Total: 92
  - Density: 1.8/sq mi (0.7/km^{2})
- Time zone: UTC-6 (Central (CST))
  - Summer (DST): UTC-5 (CDT)
- Postal Code(s): 58416, 58448 & 58484
- Area code: 701
- GNIS feature ID: 1036645
- Census Code: 42820
- Census Class Code: T1
- Website: Griggs County

Historical population
Census	Pop.	Note	%±
1890	64		—
1900	78		21.9%
1910	161		106.4%
1920	226		40.4%
1930	212		−6.2%
1940	161		−24.1%
1950	162		0.6%
1960	150		−7.4%
1970	28		−81.3%
1980	100		257.1%
1990	74		−26.0%
2000	59		−20.3%
2010	50		−15.3%
2018 (est.)	46		−8.0%

Kingsley Township is a township in Griggs County, North Dakota, United States.

== History ==
Pleasant View Township was designated by Congress on February 9, 1888. The township board met on February 23, 1893, and discussed the possibility of dividing Pleasant View into two Townships - Clearfield and Kingsley. There is no record of any action being taken. However, on July 9, 1894, it seemed to have been separated and Clearfield Township was in existence, so Kingsley Township must have been formed sometime after February 9, 1888

== Demographics ==
Its population during the 2010 census was 92.

== Location within Griggs County ==
Kingsley Township is located in Township 146 Range 61 west of the Fifth principal meridian.

	Range 61	Range 60	Range 59	Range 58
Township 148	Rosendal	Willow	Pilot Mound	Lenora
Township 147	Bryan	Addie	Tyrol	Romness
Township 146	Kingsley	Clearfield	Cooperstown	Washburn
Township 145	Mabel	Helena	Ball Hill	Sverdrup
Township 144	Dover	Bartley	Greenfield	Broadview
