= Sverdrup Township, Griggs County, North Dakota =

Sverdrup Township, North Dakota
- Township
- Location within the state of North Dakota
- Coordinates: 47°22′11″N 98°03′01″W
- Country: United States
- State: North Dakota
- County: Griggs County
- Township: Sverdrup Township

Area
  - Total: 36.01 sq mi (93.3 km^{2})
- Elevation: 1,339 ft (408 m)

Population (2010)
  - Total: 92
  - Density: 2.6/sq mi (1/km^{2})
- Time zone: UTC-6 (Central (CST))
  - Summer (DST): UTC-5 (CDT)
- Postal Code(s): 58425
- Area code: 701
- GNIS feature ID: 1036630
- Census Code: 77340
- Census Class Code: T1
- Website: Griggs County

Historical population
Census	Pop.	Note	%±
1890	274		—
1900	331		20.8%
1910	327		−1.2%
1920	327		0.0%
1930	315		−3.7%
1940	240		−23.8%
1950	202		−15.8%
1960	155		−23.3%
1970	139		−10.3%
1980	112		−19.4%
1990	109		−2.7%
2000	90		−17.4%
2010	92		2.2%
2018 (est.)	84		−8.7%

Sverdrup Township is a township in Griggs County, North Dakota, United States.

== Demographics ==
Its population during the 2010 census was 92.

== Location within Griggs County ==
Sverdrup Township is located in Township 145 Range 58 west of the Fifth principal meridian.

	Range 61	Range 60	Range 59	Range 58
Township 148	Rosendal	Willow	Pilot Mound	Lenora
Township 147	Bryan	Addie	Tyrol	Romness
Township 146	Kingsley	Clearfield	Cooperstown	Washburn
Township 145	Mabel	Helena	Ball Hill	Sverdrup
Township 144	Dover	Bartley	Greenfield	Broadview
