= Dover Township, Griggs County, North Dakota =

Dover Township, North Dakota
- Township
- Location within the state of North Dakota
- Coordinates: 47°17′01″N 98°24′14″W
- Country: United States
- State: North Dakota
- County: Griggs County
- Township: Dover Township

Area
  - Total: 35.19 sq mi (91.1 km^{2})
- Elevation: 1,480 ft (451 m)

Population (2010)
  - Total: 46
  - Density: 1.3/sq mi (0.5/km^{2})
- Time zone: UTC-6 (Central (CST))
  - Summer (DST): UTC-5 (CDT)
- Postal Code(s): 58484, 58448 & 58492
- Area code: 701
- GNIS feature ID: 1036637
- Census Code: 20060
- Census Class Code: T1
- Website: Griggs County

Historical population
Census	Pop.	Note	%±
1900	223		—
1910	237		6.3%
1920	282		19.0%
1930	260		−7.8%
1940	179		−31.2%
1950	190		6.1%
1960	159		−16.3%
1970	112		−29.6%
1980	75		−33.0%
1990	57		−24.0%
2000	55		−3.5%
2010	46		−16.4%
2018 (est.)	44		−4.3%

Dover Township is a township in Griggs County, North Dakota, United States.

== Demographics ==
Its population during the 2010 census was 46.

== Location within Griggs County ==
Dover Township is located in Township 144 Range 61 west of the Fifth principal meridian.

	Range 61	Range 60	Range 59	Range 58
Township 148	Rosendal	Willow	Pilot Mound	Lenora
Township 147	Bryan	Addie	Tyrol	Romness
Township 146	Kingsley	Clearfield	Cooperstown	Washburn
Township 145	Mabel	Helena	Ball Hill	Sverdrup
Township 144	Dover	Bartley	Greenfield	Broadview
