= Lenora Township, Griggs County, North Dakota =

Lenora Township, North Dakota
- Township
- Location within the state of North Dakota
- Coordinates: 47°37′47″N 98°02′54″W
- Country: United States
- State: North Dakota
- County: Griggs County
- Township: Lenora Township

Area
  - Total: 34.79 sq mi (90.1 km^{2})
- Elevation: 1,480 ft (451 m)

Population (2010)
  - Total: 60
  - Density: 1.8/sq mi (0.7/km^{2})
- Time zone: UTC-6 (Central (CST))
  - Summer (DST): UTC-5 (CDT)
- Postal Code(s): 58212
- Area code: 701
- GNIS feature ID: 1036648
- Census Code: 45900
- Census Class Code: T1
- Website: Griggs County

Historical population
Census	Pop.	Note	%±
1900	181		—
1910	231		27.6%
1920	201		−13.0%
1930	239		18.9%
1940	192		−19.7%
1950	150		−21.9%
1960	148		−1.3%
1970	114		−23.0%
1980	101		−11.4%
1990	97		−4.0%
2000	87		−10.3%
2010	60		−31.0%
2018 (est.)	55		−8.3%

Lenora Township is a township in Griggs County, North Dakota, United States.

== Demographics ==
Its population during the 2010 census was 60.

== Location within Griggs County ==
Lenora Township is located in Township 148 Range 58 west of the Fifth principal meridian.

	Range 61	Range 60	Range 59	Range 58
Township 148	Rosendal	Willow	Pilot Mound	Lenora
Township 147	Bryan	Addie	Tyrol	Romness
Township 146	Kingsley	Clearfield	Cooperstown	Washburn
Township 145	Mabel	Helena	Ball Hill	Sverdrup
Township 144	Dover	Bartley	Greenfield	Broadview
