= Red Willow Lake Resort =

Seasonal resort in Binford, North Dakota

Coordinates: 47°38′27.78″N 98°22′7.04″W

Red Willow Lake Resort is a private, family-owned and seasonal resort located in Binford, North Dakota. The resort is located on the southeast shore of Red Willow Lake and operates a restaurant, pavilion, campground, swimming beach, and baseball diamonds. The resort also leases shore property to private cottage owners.

Recreational activities near the resort date back to homesteaders who took up land near the lake in the early 1880s. The area quickly became a favorite recreation area for fishers, hunters, campers and picnickers. The annual Fourth of July dance was held in 1885. A Red Willow Association was formed and several buildings were erected for the future summer resort. The resort experienced several ownership and management changes until 1946 when Bill and Vernis Haines became the sole owners of the land and resort.[1]

The Haines built Red Willow Lake Resort into a thriving business that drew young people from throughout the region. The resort hosted several dances headlined by big name bands of the era. When not hosting popular dances, the pavilion was used for roller skating. The resort became well known for hosting youth and adult baseball and softball tournaments. The resort was a very popular weekend destination for generations of young people. A public access to the lake, swimming beach, boat rides, and paddle boat rentals allowed visitors to enjoy the lake.[2] The resort experienced its greatest popularity during the decades of the 1950s, 1960's and 1970's.

The resort continues to be operated by the Haines family on summer weekends.
