= Red Willow Lake (Griggs County, North Dakota) =

Lake in the state of North Dakota, United States

- Location within North Dakota
- Location: Griggs County, North Dakota
- Coordinates: 47°38′49″N 98°22′23″W
- Type: Lake
- Surface area: 149.4 acres (60.5 ha)
- Average depth: 11.1 feet (3.4 m)
- Max. depth: 25.2 feet (7.7 m)
- Shore length^{1}: 2.8 miles (4.5 km)
- Surface elevation: 1,463 feet (446 m)
- ^{1} Shore length is not a well-defined measure.

Red Willow Lake is a naturally formed lake located in Griggs County, North Dakota. The nearest town is Binford.

The lake covers 149.4 acres (60.5 ha), has 2.8 miles (4.5 km) of shoreline, and has an average depth of 11.1 feet (3.4 m), with a maximum depth of 25.2 feet (7.7 m). Red Willow Lake is an endorheic (closed) lake; it has no significant input or output of rivers or streams and is fed only by rain and natural springs.

Red Willow Lake first became recognized as a recreational resource in 1882.

== Places to stay ==
- Red Willow Lake Resort
