= Mabel Township, Griggs County, North Dakota =

Mabel Township, North Dakota
- Township
- Location within the state of North Dakota
- Coordinates: 47°22′12″N 98°26′08″W 472212N 0982608W
- Country: United States
- State: North Dakota
- County: Griggs County
- Township: Mabel Township

Area
  - Total: 35.99 sq mi (93.2 km^{2})
- Elevation: 1,473 ft (449 m)

Population (2010)
  - Total: 52
  - Density: 1.3/sq mi (0.5/km^{2})
- Time zone: UTC-6 (Central (CST))
  - Summer (DST): UTC-5 (CDT)
- Postal Code(s): 58484
- Area code: 701
- GNIS feature ID: 1036638
- Census Code: 48820
- Census Class Code: T1
- Website: Griggs County

Historical population
Census	Pop.	Note	%±
1890	81		—
1900	220		171.6%
1910	208		−5.5%
1920	365		75.5%
1930	376		3.0%
1940	330		−12.2%
1950	305		−7.6%
1960	232		−23.9%
1970	19		−91.8%
1980	126		563.2%
1990	110		−12.7%
2000	81		−26.4%
2010	52		−35.8%
2018 (est.)	48		−7.7%

Mabel Township is a township in Griggs County, North Dakota, United States.

== Demographics ==
Its population during the 2010 census was 52.

== Location within Griggs County ==
Mabel Township is located in Township 145 Range 61 west of the Fifth principal meridian.

	Range 61	Range 60	Range 59	Range 58
Township 148	Rosendal	Willow	Pilot Mound	Lenora
Township 147	Bryan	Addie	Tyrol	Romness
Township 146	Kingsley	Clearfield	Cooperstown	Washburn
Township 145	Mabel	Helena	Ball Hill	Sverdrup
Township 144	Dover	Bartley	Greenfield	Broadview
