= Tyrol Township, Griggs County, North Dakota =

Tyrol Township, North Dakota
- Township
- Location within the state of North Dakota
- Coordinates: 47°32′38″N 98°10′42″W
- Country: United States
- State: North Dakota
- County: Griggs County
- Township: Tyrol Township

Area
  - Total: 36.37 sq mi (94.2 km^{2})
- Elevation: 1,457 ft (444 m)

Population (2010)
  - Total: 116
  - Density: 3.1/sq mi (1.2/km^{2})
- Time zone: UTC-6 (Central (CST))
  - Summer (DST): UTC-5 (CDT)
- Postal Code(s): 58416 & 58425
- Area code: 701
- GNIS feature ID: 1036644
- Census Code: 80580
- Census Class Code: T1
- Website: Griggs County

Historical population
Census	Pop.	Note	%±
1890	182		—
1900	228		25.3%
1910	371		62.7%
1920	353		−4.9%
1930	325		−7.9%
1940	307		−5.5%
1950	291		−5.2%
1960	222		−23.7%
1970	173		−22.1%
1980	179		3.5%
1990	161		−10.1%
2000	125		−22.4%
2010	116		−7.2%
2018 (est.)	106		−8.6%

Tyrol Township is a township in Griggs County, North Dakota, United States.

== Demographics ==
Its population during the 2010 census was 116.

== Location within Griggs County ==
Tyrol Township is located in Township 147 Range 59 west of the Fifth principal meridian.

	Range 61	Range 60	Range 59	Range 58
Township 148	Rosendal	Willow	Pilot Mound	Lenora
Township 147	Bryan	Addie	Tyrol	Romness
Township 146	Kingsley	Clearfield	Cooperstown	Washburn
Township 145	Mabel	Helena	Ball Hill	Sverdrup
Township 144	Dover	Bartley	Greenfield	Broadview
