= Willow Township, Griggs County, North Dakota =

Willow Township, North Dakota
- Township
- Location within the state of North Dakota
- Coordinates: 47°37′47″N 98°18′29″W
- Country: United States
- State: North Dakota
- County: Griggs County
- Township: Willow Township

Area
  - Total: 34.52 sq mi (89.4 km^{2})
- Elevation: 1,453 ft (443 m)

Population (2010)
  - Total: 53
  - Density: 1.6/sq mi (0.6/km^{2})
- Time zone: UTC-6 (Central (CST))
  - Summer (DST): UTC-5 (CDT)
- Postal Code(s): 58416
- Area code: 701
- GNIS feature ID: 1036654
- Census Code: 86300
- Census Class Code: T1
- Website: Griggs County

Historical population
Census	Pop.	Note	%±
1890	98		—
1900	136		38.8%
1910	193		41.9%
1920	230		19.2%
1930	224		−2.6%
1940	167		−25.4%
1950	135		−19.2%
1960	143		5.9%
1970	123		−14.0%
1980	111		−9.8%
1990	79		−28.8%
2000	55		−30.4%
2010	53		−3.6%
2018 (est.)	49		−7.5%

Willow Township is a township in Griggs County, North Dakota, United States.

== History ==
The earliest record of Willow Township is a meeting of the supervisors held on March 29, 1887, at Johnson's Store, which is believed to have been located several miles east of Red Willow Lake. Willow Township is believed to have been organized a year or two earlier.

== Demographics ==
Its population during the 2010 census was 53.

== Location within Griggs County ==
Willow Township is located in Township 148 Range 60 west of the Fifth principal meridian.

	Range 61	Range 60	Range 59	Range 58
Township 148	Rosendal	Willow	Pilot Mound	Lenora
Township 147	Bryan	Addie	Tyrol	Romness
Township 146	Kingsley	Clearfield	Cooperstown	Washburn
Township 145	Mabel	Helena	Ball Hill	Sverdrup
Township 144	Dover	Bartley	Greenfield	Broadview
