= Rosendal Township, Griggs County, North Dakota =

Rosendal Township, North Dakota
- Township
- Location within the state of North Dakota
- Coordinates: 47°37′47″N 98°26′10″W
- Country: United States
- State: North Dakota
- County: Griggs County
- Township: Rosendal Township

Area
  - Total: 34.78 sq mi (90.1 km^{2})
- Elevation: 1,650 ft (503 m)

Population (2010)
  - Total: 35
  - Density: 1.0/sq mi (0.4/km^{2})
- Time zone: UTC-6 (Central (CST))
  - Summer (DST): UTC-5 (CDT)
- Postal Code(s): 58416 & 58464
- Area code: 701
- GNIS feature ID: 1036656
- Census Code: 68460
- Census Class Code: T1
- Website: Griggs County

Historical population
Census	Pop.	Note	%±
1890	30		—
1900	93		210.0%
1910	216		132.3%
1920	211		−2.3%
1930	176		−16.6%
1940	146		−17.0%
1950	118		−19.2%
1960	99		−16.1%
1970	68		−31.3%
1980	68		0.0%
1990	54		−20.6%
2000	40		−25.9%
2010	35		−12.5%
2018 (est.)	32		−8.6%

Rosendal Township is a township in Griggs County, North Dakota, United States.

== Demographics ==
Its population during the 2010 census was 35. This number remained the same in the 2020 decennial census at 35.

== Location within Griggs County ==
Rosendal Township is located in Township 148 Range 61 west of the Fifth principal meridian.

	Range 61	Range 60	Range 59	Range 58
Township 148	Rosendal	Willow	Pilot Mound	Lenora
Township 147	Bryan	Addie	Tyrol	Romness
Township 146	Kingsley	Clearfield	Cooperstown	Washburn
Township 145	Mabel	Helena	Ball Hill	Sverdrup
Township 144	Dover	Bartley	Greenfield	Broadview
