= Broadview Township, North Dakota =

Township in Griggs County, North Dakota, US

- Township
- Location within the state of North Dakota
- Coordinates: 47°17′01″N 98°01′28″W
- Country: United States
- State: North Dakota
- County: Griggs County
- Township: Broadview Township

Area
  - Total: 33.92 sq mi (87.9 km^{2})
- Elevation: 1,398 ft (426 m)

Population (2020)
  - Total: 44
  - Density: 1.3/sq mi (0.5/km^{2})
- Time zone: UTC-6 (Central (CST))
  - Summer (DST): UTC-5 (CDT)
- Postal Code(s): 58086 & 58448
- Area code: 701
- GNIS feature ID: 1036629
- Census Code: 09660
- Census Class Code: T1
- Website: Griggs County

Historical population
Census	Pop.	Note	%±
1890	92		—
1900	194		110.9%
1910	190		−2.1%
1920	331		74.2%
1930	275		−16.9%
1940	183		−33.5%
1950	166		−9.3%
1960	118		−28.9%
1970	83		−29.7%
1980	68		−18.1%
1990	53		−22.1%
2000	35		−34.0%
2010	38		8.6%
2020	44		15.8%
U.S. Decennial Census

Broadview Township is a township in Griggs County, North Dakota, United States.

== Demographics ==
Its population during the 2020 census was 44.

== Location within Griggs County ==
Broadview Township is located in Township 144 Range 58 west of the Fifth principal meridian.

	Range 61	Range 60	Range 59	Range 58
Township 148	Rosendal	Willow	Pilot Mound	Lenora
Township 147	Bryan	Addie	Tyrol	Romness
Township 146	Kingsley	Clearfield	Cooperstown	Washburn
Township 145	Mabel	Helena	Ball Hill	Sverdrup
Township 144	Dover	Bartley	Greenfield	Broadview
