= Greenfield Township, Griggs County, North Dakota =

Greenfield Township, North Dakota
- Township
- Location within the state of North Dakota
- Coordinates: 47°17′01″N 98°09′05″W
- Country: United States
- State: North Dakota
- County: Griggs County
- Township: Greenfield Township

Area
  - Total: 34.91 sq mi (90.4 km^{2})
- Elevation: 1,404 ft (428 m)

Population (2010)
  - Total: 102
  - Density: 2.8/sq mi (1.1/km^{2})
- Time zone: UTC-6 (Central (CST))
  - Summer (DST): UTC-5 (CDT)
- Postal Code(s): 58429 & 58448
- Area code: 701
- GNIS feature ID: 1036632
- Census Code: 33260
- Census Class Code: T1
- Website: Griggs County

Historical population
Census	Pop.	Note	%±
1900	388		—
1910	290		−25.3%
1920	360		24.1%
1930	337		−6.4%
1940	244		−27.6%
1950	240		−1.6%
1960	193		−19.6%
1970	181		−6.2%
1980	137		−24.3%
1990	117		−14.6%
2000	92		−21.4%
2010	102		10.9%
2018 (est.)	94		−7.8%

Greenfield Township is a township in Griggs County, North Dakota, United States.

== Demographics ==
Its population during the 2010 census was 102.

== Location within Griggs County ==
Greenfield Township is located in Township 144 Range 59 west of the Fifth principal meridian.

	Range 61	Range 60	Range 59	Range 58
Township 148	Rosendal	Willow	Pilot Mound	Lenora
Township 147	Bryan	Addie	Tyrol	Romness
Township 146	Kingsley	Clearfield	Cooperstown	Washburn
Township 145	Mabel	Helena	Ball Hill	Sverdrup
Township 144	Dover	Bartley	Greenfield	Broadview
