= Red Willow Lake =

Red Willow Lake may refer to:

- Red Willow Reservoir, McCook, Nebraska
- Red Willow Lake, North Dakota
