= Ball Hill Township, Griggs County, North Dakota =

Ball Hill Township, North Dakota
- Township
- Location within the state of North Dakota
- Coordinates: 47°22′12″N 98°10′44″W
- Country: United States
- State: North Dakota
- County: Griggs County
- Township: Ball Hill Township

Area
  - Total: 36.49 sq mi (94.5 km^{2})
- Elevation: 1,460 ft (445 m)

Population (2010)
  - Total: 55
  - Density: 1.6/sq mi (0.6/km^{2})
- Time zone: UTC-6 (Central (CST))
  - Summer (DST): UTC-5 (CDT)
- Postal Code(s): 58448 & 58425
- Area code: 701
- GNIS feature ID: 1036633
- Census Code: 04540
- Census Class Code: T1
- Website: Griggs County

Historical population
Census	Pop.	Note	%±
1890	183		—
1900	244		33.3%
1910	266		9.0%
1920	276		3.8%
1930	260		−5.8%
1940	204		−21.5%
1950	194		−4.9%
1960	150		−22.7%
1970	113		−24.7%
1980	119		5.3%
1990	109		−8.4%
2000	82		−24.8%
2010	55		−32.9%
2018 (est.)	51		−7.3%

Ball Hill Township is a township in Griggs County, North Dakota, United States.

== Demographics ==
Its population during the 2010 census was 55.

== Location within Griggs County ==
Ball Hill Township is located in Township 145 Range 59 west of the Fifth principal meridian.

	Range 61	Range 60	Range 59	Range 58
Township 148	Rosendal	Willow	Pilot Mound	Lenora
Township 147	Bryan	Addie	Tyrol	Romness
Township 146	Kingsley	Clearfield	Cooperstown	Washburn
Township 145	Mabel	Helena	Ball Hill	Sverdrup
Township 144	Dover	Bartley	Greenfield	Broadview
