= Jessie, North Dakota =

- Census-designated place
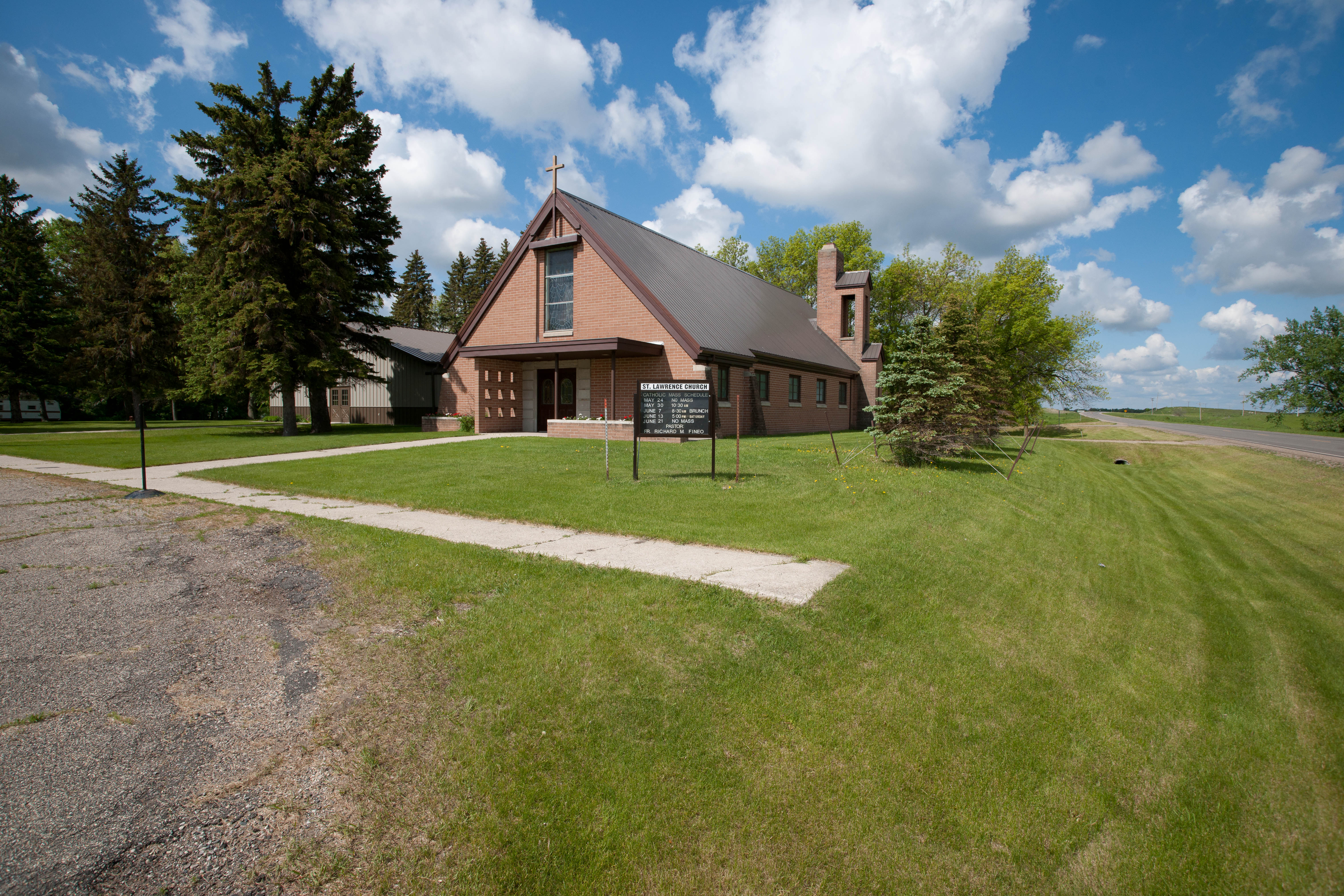
- St. Lawrence Church in Jessie

- Location within North Dakota Location within the United States
- Coordinates: 47°32′25″N 98°13′45″W
- Country: United States
- State: North Dakota
- County: Griggs

Area
  - Total: 0.47 sq mi (1.23 km^{2})
  - Land: 0.47 sq mi (1.23 km^{2})
  - Water: 0 sq mi (0.00 km^{2})
- Elevation: 1,450 ft (440 m)

Population (2020)
  - Total: 22
  - Density: 46/sq mi (17.9/km^{2})
- Time zone: UTC-6 (Central (CST))
  - Summer (DST): UTC-5 (CDT)
- ZIP codes: 58452
- Area code: 701
- FIPS code: 38-40740
- GNIS feature ID: 2584348

Jessie is a census-designated place in northern Griggs County, North Dakota, United States. As of the 2020 census, Jessie had a population of 22. An unincorporated community, it was designated as part of the U.S. Census Bureau's Participant Statistical Areas Program on March 31, 2010. It was not counted separately during the 2000 Census, but was included in the 2010 Census.

It lies along North Dakota Highway 65 northwest of the city of Cooperstown, the county seat of Griggs County.

== Demographics ==
Historical population
Census	Pop.	Note	%±
2020	22		—
U.S. Decennial Census
