= Bartley Township, Griggs County, North Dakota =

Bartley Township, North Dakota
- Township
- Location within the state of North Dakota
- Coordinates: 47°17′01″N 98°16′40″W
- Country: United States
- State: North Dakota
- County: Griggs County
- Township: Bartley Township

Area
  - Total: 34.32 sq mi (88.9 km^{2})
- Elevation: 1,427 ft (435 m)

Population (2010)
  - Total: 44
  - Density: 0.78/sq mi (0.3/km^{2})
- Time zone: UTC-6 (Central (CST))
  - Summer (DST): UTC-5 (CDT)
- Postal Code(s): 58448
- Area code: 701
- GNIS feature ID: 1036635
- Census Code: 05180
- Census Class Code: T1
- Website: Griggs County

Historical population
Census	Pop.	Note	%±
1890	101		—
1900	214		111.9%
1910	216		0.9%
1920	209		−3.2%
1930	221		5.7%
1940	157		−29.0%
1950	120		−23.6%
1960	102		−15.0%
1970	75		−26.5%
1980	48		−36.0%
1990	46		−4.2%
2000	31		−32.6%
2010	25		−19.4%
2018 (est.)	23		−8.0%

Bartley Township is a township in Griggs County, North Dakota, United States.

== Demographics ==
Its population during the 2010 census was 25.

== Location within Griggs County ==
Bartley Township is located in Township 144 Range 60 west of the Fifth principal meridian.

	Range 61	Range 60	Range 59	Range 58
Township 148	Rosendal	Willow	Pilot Mound	Lenora
Township 147	Bryan	Addie	Tyrol	Romness
Township 146	Kingsley	Clearfield	Cooperstown	Washburn
Township 145	Mabel	Helena	Ball Hill	Sverdrup
Township 144	Dover	Bartley	Greenfield	Broadview
