= Pilot Mound Township, Griggs County, North Dakota =

Pilot Mound Township, North Dakota
- Township
- Location within the state of North Dakota
- Coordinates: 47°37′47″N 98°10′41″W
- Country: United States
- State: North Dakota
- County: Griggs County
- Township: Pilot Mound Township

Area
  - Total: 36.06 sq mi (93.4 km^{2})
- Elevation: 1,427 ft (435 m)

Population (2010)
  - Total: 41
  - Density: 1.0/sq mi (0.4/km^{2})
- Time zone: UTC-6 (Central (CST))
  - Summer (DST): UTC-5 (CDT)
- Postal Code(s): 58416 & 58212
- Area code: 701
- GNIS feature ID: 1036651
- Census Code: 62580
- Census Class Code: T1
- Website: Griggs County

Historical population
Census	Pop.	Note	%±
1890	182		—
1900	196		7.7%
1910	261		33.2%
1920	293		12.3%
1930	295		0.7%
1940	215		−27.1%
1950	199		−7.4%
1960	150		−24.6%
1970	107		−28.7%
1980	88		−17.8%
1990	81		−8.0%
2000	59		−27.2%
2010	41		−30.5%
2018 (est.)	39		−4.9%

Pilot Mound Township is a township in Griggs County, North Dakota, United States.

== History ==
The petition to organize was presented to the Griggs County Commission on February 25, 1887, and the first Township meeting was held on March 15, 1887, at the schoolhouse in Section 25.

== Demographics ==
Its population during the 2010 census was 41.

== Location within Griggs County ==
Pilot Mound Township is located in Township 148 Range 59 west of the Fifth principal meridian.

	Range 61	Range 60	Range 59	Range 58
Township 148	Rosendal	Willow	Pilot Mound	Lenora
Township 147	Bryan	Addie	Tyrol	Romness
Township 146	Kingsley	Clearfield	Cooperstown	Washburn
Township 145	Mabel	Helena	Ball Hill	Sverdrup
Township 144	Dover	Bartley	Greenfield	Broadview
