= Griggs County Courthouse =

Historic government building in North Dakota, United States

- U.S. National Register of Historic Places
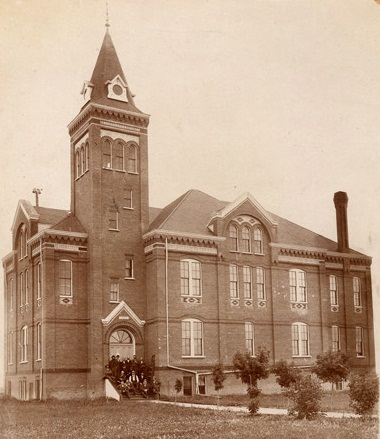
- Griggs County Courthouse, c. 1892

- Location within North Dakota Location within the United States
- Interactive map showing the location of Griggs County Courthouse
- Location: Rollin Ave., Cooperstown, North Dakota
- Coordinates: 47°26′31″N 98°7′27″W
- Area: 2.1 acres (0.85 ha)
- Built: 1884
- Built by: Alexander Moffat
- Architect: F.B. Edwards
- Architectural style: Victorian Gothic
- MPS: North Dakota County Courthouses TR (AD)
- NRHP reference No.: 77001025
- Added to NRHP: July 21, 1977

The Griggs County Courthouse in Cooperstown, North Dakota was built in 1884. It was listed on the National Register of Historic Places in 1977.

Within the courthouse grounds is an 1879 log house built by Omund Nelson Opheim, which was moved to here from 10 miles northeast of Cooperstown. It is believed to be the first house in Griggs County built by a white settler.
