= Cooperstown Township, Griggs County, North Dakota =

Cooperstown Township, North Dakota
- Township
- Location within the state of North Dakota
- Coordinates: 47°27′26″N 98°10′48″W
- Country: United States
- State: North Dakota
- County: Griggs County
- Township: Cooperstown Township

Area
  - Total: 35.45 sq mi (91.8 km^{2})
- Elevation: 1,470 ft (448 m)

Population (2010)
  - Total: 56
  - Density: 1.6/sq mi (0.6/km^{2})
- Time zone: UTC-6 (Central (CST))
  - Summer (DST): UTC-5 (CDT)
- Area code: 701
- GNIS feature ID: 1036643
- Census Code: 15940
- Census Class Code: T1
- Website: Griggs County

Historical population
Census	Pop.	Note	%±
1890	120		—
1900	226		88.3%
1910	283		25.2%
1920	297		4.9%
1930	231		−22.2%
1940	239		3.5%
1950	208		−13.0%
1960	188		−9.6%
1970	109		−42.0%
1980	104		−4.6%
1990	86		−17.3%
2000	82		−4.7%
2010	56		−31.7%
2018 (est.)	51		−8.9%

Cooperstown Township is a township in Griggs County, North Dakota, United States.

== History ==
There was a meeting called by the county clerk of Griggs County on February 9, 1888, at 2 PM for organizing Township 146-59, also known as Cooperstown Township. The first township records were destroyed.

== Demographics ==
Its population during the 2010 census was 56.

== Location within Griggs County ==
Cooperstown Township is located in Township 146 Range 59 west of the Fifth principal meridian.

	Range 61	Range 60	Range 59	Range 58
Township 148	Rosendal	Willow	Pilot Mound	Lenora
Township 147	Bryan	Addie	Tyrol	Romness
Township 146	Kingsley	Clearfield	Cooperstown	Washburn
Township 145	Mabel	Helena	Ball Hill	Sverdrup
Township 144	Dover	Bartley	Greenfield	Broadview
