= North Dakota Highway 200 Alternate (Traill County) =

State highway in eastern North Dakota, U.S.

State Route 200 Alternate

Route information
- Auxiliary route of ND 200
- Maintained by NDDOT
- Length: 8.353 mi (13.443 km)

Major junctions
- West end: ND 18 southwest of Hillsboro
- I-29 south of Hillsboro
- East end: ND 200 south of Hillsboro

Location
- Country: United States
- State: North Dakota
- Counties: Traill

Highway system
- North Dakota State Highway System; Interstate; US; State
← ND 200	→ ND 210

North Dakota Highway 200 Alternate (Alt. ND 200) is a 8.353-mile-long (13.443 km) east–west state highway in the U.S. state of North Dakota. Alt. ND 200's western terminus is at ND 18 southwest of Hillsboro, and the eastern terminus is at ND 200 south of Hillsboro.

== Major intersections ==
The entire route is in Traill County.

Location	mi	km	Destinations	Notes
Blanchard Township	0.000	0.000	ND 18 – Mayville, Blanchard, Casselton	Western terminus
Hillsboro Township	7.930	12.762	I-29 / US 81 – Fargo, Grand Forks	I-29 Exit 100
Hillsboro Township	8.353	13.443	ND 200 – Hillsboro, Halstad, CR 81 south – Kelso	Eastern terminus; roadway continues east as ND 200
1.000 mi = 1.609 km; 1.000 km = 0.621 mi
