= Karnak, North Dakota =

Unincorporated community in North Dakota, US

Karnak
- Unincorporated community
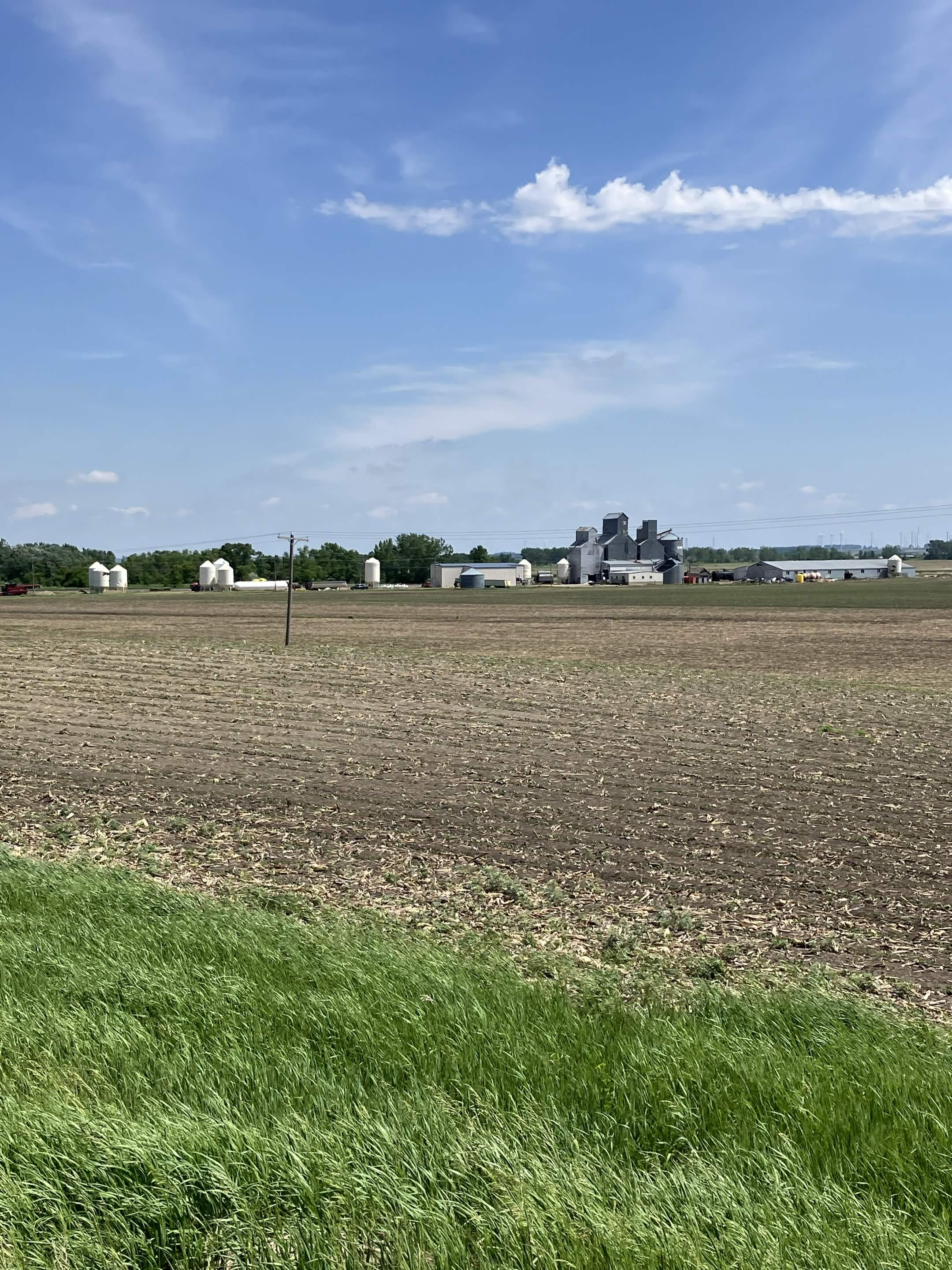

- Location within North Dakota
- Coordinates: 47°26′31″N 97°48′30″W
- Country: United States
- State: North Dakota
- County: Griggs County
- Elevation: 1,408 ft (429 m)
- GNIS feature ID: 1029715

Karnak is an unincorporated community in Griggs County, North Dakota, United States.

== Founding ==
Karnak was founded by the Great Northern Railway (U.S.) in 1910. The community was originally known as Fairview, but the name was changed to Karnak in 1912. A post office was established in 1913 and remained in operation until 1954. Karnak is a nearly abandoned ghost town with a current population of 7.
