= Prospect K. Robbins =

American surveyor (1788–1847)

Prosoect K. Robbins
- Born: December 22, 1788; Pittsfield, Massachusetts, U.S.
- Died: 1847; Ste. Genevieve, Missouri, U.S.
- Resting place: Memorial Cemetery
- Occupations: Army officer; surveyor
- Known for: Fifth Principal Meridian
- Military service
- Branch: Missouri Militia; United States Volunteers
- Service years: 1812 (Mo.); 1813–1815 (U.S.)
- Rank: Adjutant (Mo.); First Lieutenant (U.S.)
- Units: Colonel McNair's Mounted Regiment (1812); Rangers (1813–1815)
- Wars: War of 1812

Prospect K. Robbins (December 22, 1788 – 1847) was an American surveyor known for establishing the Fifth Principal Meridian that governs the surveys of all or part of present-day Arkansas, Iowa, Minnesota, Missouri, and South Dakota. The Fifth Principal Meridian was established in 1815 to survey the territory of the Louisiana Purchase, an area of 830,000 square miles (2,100,000 km^{2}).
