= Cummings, North Dakota =

Cummings
- Unincorporated community
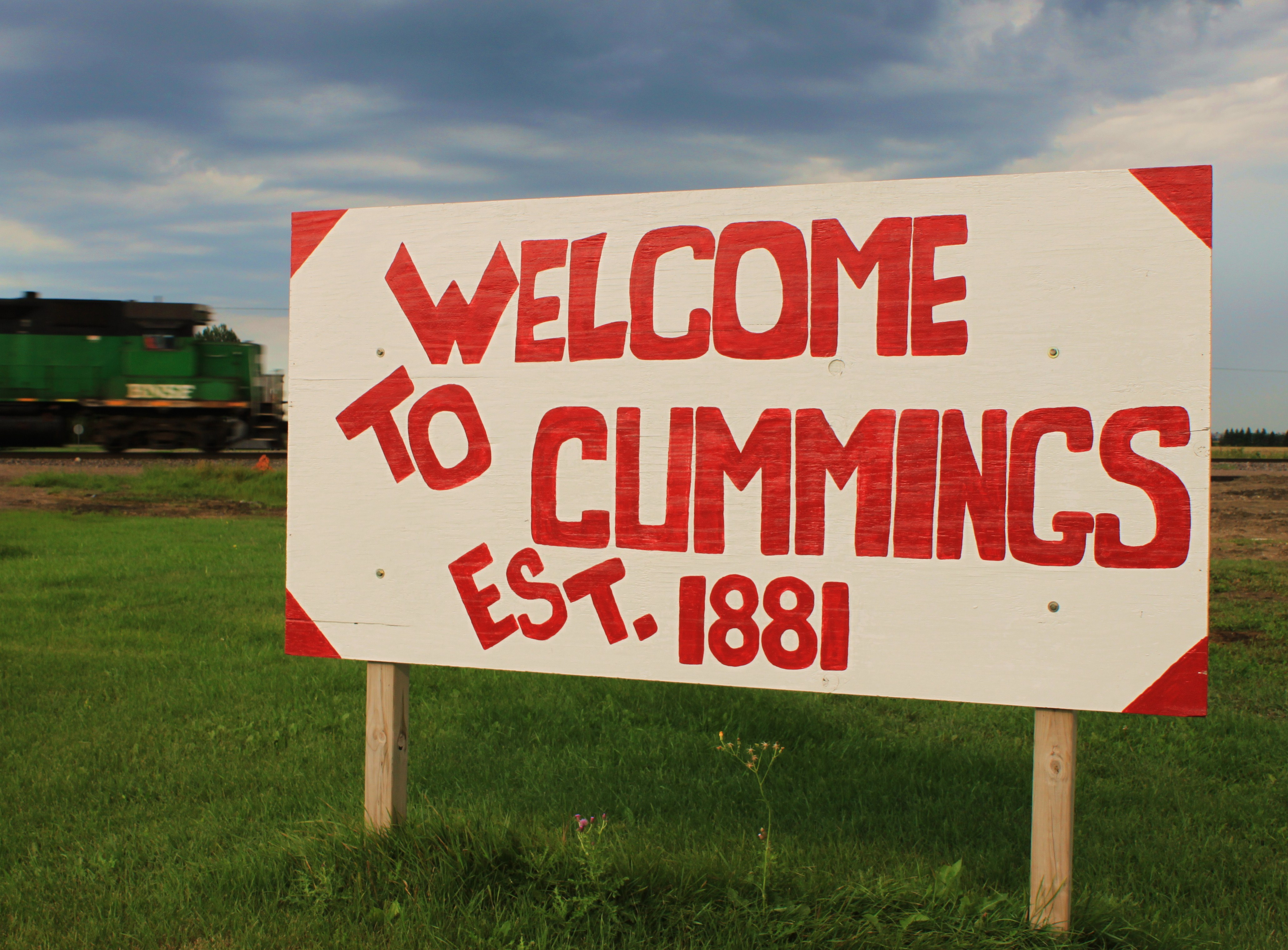

- Location within the state of North Dakota Cummings (the United States)
- Coordinates: 47°30′53″N 97°04′46″W
- Country: United States
- State: North Dakota
- County: Traill
- Elevation: 932 ft (284 m)

Population (2000)
  - Total: 219
- Time zone: UTC-6 (Central (CST))
  - Summer (DST): UTC-5 (CDT)
- ZIP code: 58223
- Area code: 701
- GNIS feature ID: 1035602

Cummings is an unincorporated community in Traill County, North Dakota, United States.

== Geography ==
Cummings is situated directly between Interstate 29 and U.S. Route 81 and is connected to those two highways by North Dakota State Highway 200. Cummings is located several miles north of the city of Hillsboro.

== History ==
A post office was established at Cummings in 1881. The community was named for Henry Cumings, a Great Northern Railway worker, whose name was misspelled so often as Cummings that the Post Office made the change official in 1922. It is today largely a farming community, as is the rest of the county.

In all of Cummings' history one of their best-known residents was William J. Burnett (born August 14, 1854), who served two terms as a representative for the eighth district in the state senate. In addition to his work in the state senate, Burnett was an advocate for the development of the Farmers' Elevator. His work on behalf of the town resulted in both population and commercial growth in the late 19th century.

As of 1910, Cummings had a schoolhouse, grain elevators, general stores, and churches.

In the 1940s and 1950s there were several businesses. These included the post office, a grocery store, a bank, a hardware store, a blacksmith, two grain elevators, several potato houses, the Farmer’s Union oil tanks, and the Great Northern Railway depot. There were also Ervin #3 school (1st through 8th grades) and a city hall. The Farmers' Elevator burned to the ground on January 1, 1960. The blacksmith building was destroyed by fire on February 17, 1960. The school was demolished in 1996.

The Great Northern depot, which included living quarters for the agent and his family, was located west of the tracks. Joseph Notch was the agent/telegrapher from the early 1930s until his death in 1962. The depot was twice threatened by fire. Once, when burning embers from the Farmers' Elevator fire landed on its roof, several farmers from around Cummings came to the rescue with grain trucks to evacuate the agent and his family. Prior to this, a hot box from a railroad car had ignited the dry prairie grass. The agent and his family, using potato sacks soaked in precious water, managed to get the fire out just before it reached the depot and garage. The depot was sold and removed shortly after the agent's death in 1962, being purchased and renovated into a home. As of 2016, it is still located a few miles west of Cummings.

== Transportation ==
Amtrak’s Empire Builder, which operates between Seattle/Portland and Chicago, passes through the town on BNSF tracks, but makes no stop. The nearest station is located in Grand Forks, 32 miles (51 km) to the north.
