= Kevin Wolsky =

American politician

Member-elect of the North Dakota House of Representatives from the 29th district
- Assuming office December 2026
- Succeeding: Don Vigesaa

Personal details
- Party: Republican

Kevin Wolsky is an American politician. A member of the Republican Party, he is the member-elect for the 29th district of the North Dakota House of Representatives.
