= Helena Township, Griggs County, North Dakota =

Helena Township, North Dakota
- Township
- Location within the state of North Dakota
- Coordinates: 47°22′12″N 98°18′27″W
- Country: United States
- State: North Dakota
- County: Griggs County
- Township: Helena Township

Area
  - Total: 35.98 sq mi (93.2 km^{2})
- Elevation: 1,401 ft (427 m)

Population (2010)
  - Total: 50
  - Density: 1.3/sq mi (0.5/km^{2})
- Time zone: UTC-6 (Central (CST))
  - Summer (DST): UTC-5 (CDT)
- Area code: 701
- GNIS feature ID: 1036636
- Census Code: 37100
- Census Class Code: T1
- Website: Griggs County

Historical population
| Census | Pop. | Note | %± |
|---|---|---|---|
| 1890 | 83 | | — |
| 1900 | 160 | | 92.8% |
| 1910 | 162 | | 1.3% |
| 1920 | 270 | | 66.7% |
| 1930 | 253 | | −6.3% |
| 1940 | 182 | | −28.1% |
| 1950 | 170 | | −6.6% |
| 1960 | 139 | | −18.2% |
| 1970 | 152 | | 9.4% |
| 1980 | 71 | | −53.3% |
| 1990 | 64 | | −9.9% |
| 2000 | 58 | | −9.4% |
| 2010 | 50 | | −13.8% |
| 2018 (est.) | 46 | | −8.0% |

Helena Township is a township in Griggs County, North Dakota, United States.

== Demographics ==
Its population during the 2010 census was 50.

== Location within Griggs County ==
Helena Township is located in Township 145 Range 60 west of the Fifth principal meridian.

| | Range 61 | Range 60 | Range 59 | Range 58 |
| Township 148 | Rosendal | Willow | Pilot Mound | Lenora |
| Township 147 | Bryan | Addie | Tyrol | Romness |
| Township 146 | Kingsley | Clearfield | Cooperstown | Washburn |
| Township 145 | Mabel | Helena | Ball Hill | Sverdrup |
| Township 144 | Dover | Bartley | Greenfield | Broadview |
