= Clearfield Township, Griggs County, North Dakota =

Clearfield Township, North Dakota
- Township
- Location within the state of North Dakota
- Coordinates: 47°27′25″N 98°18′28″W
- Country: United States
- State: North Dakota
- County: Griggs County
- Township: Clearfield Township

Area
  - Total: 35.36 sq mi (91.6 km^{2})
- Elevation: 1,450 ft (442 m)

Population (2010)
  - Total: 44
  - Density: 1.3/sq mi (0.5/km^{2})
- Time zone: UTC-6 (Central (CST))
  - Summer (DST): UTC-5 (CDT)
- Postal Code(s): 58416 & 58425
- Area code: 701
- GNIS feature ID: 1036644
- Census Code: 14340
- Census Class Code: T1
- Website: Griggs County

Historical population
Census	Pop.	Note	%±
1900	137		—
1910	128		−6.6%
1920	172		34.4%
1930	195		13.4%
1940	127		−34.9%
1950	152		19.7%
1960	137		−9.9%
1970	94		−31.4%
1980	94		0.0%
1990	65		−30.9%
2000	49		−24.6%
2010	44		−10.2%
2018 (est.)	40		−9.1%

Clearfield Township is a township in Griggs County, North Dakota, United States.

== History ==
The exact date that Clearfield Township was incorporated is unknown. Pleasant View Township was designated by Congress on February 9, 1888. The township board met on February 23, 1893, and discussed the possibility of dividing Pleasant View into two Townships – Clearfield and Kingsley. There is no record of any action being taken. However, on July 9, 1894, it seemed to have been separated and Clearfield Township was in existence.

== Demographics ==
Its population during the 2010 census was 44.

== Location within Griggs County ==
Clearfield Township is located in Township 146 Range 60 west of the Fifth principal meridian.

	Range 61	Range 60	Range 59	Range 58
Township 148	Rosendal	Willow	Pilot Mound	Lenora
Township 147	Bryan	Addie	Tyrol	Romness
Township 146	Kingsley	Clearfield	Cooperstown	Washburn
Township 145	Mabel	Helena	Ball Hill	Sverdrup
Township 144	Dover	Bartley	Greenfield	Broadview
