= Walum, North Dakota =

Unincorporated community in North Dakota, US

Walum
- Unincorporated community
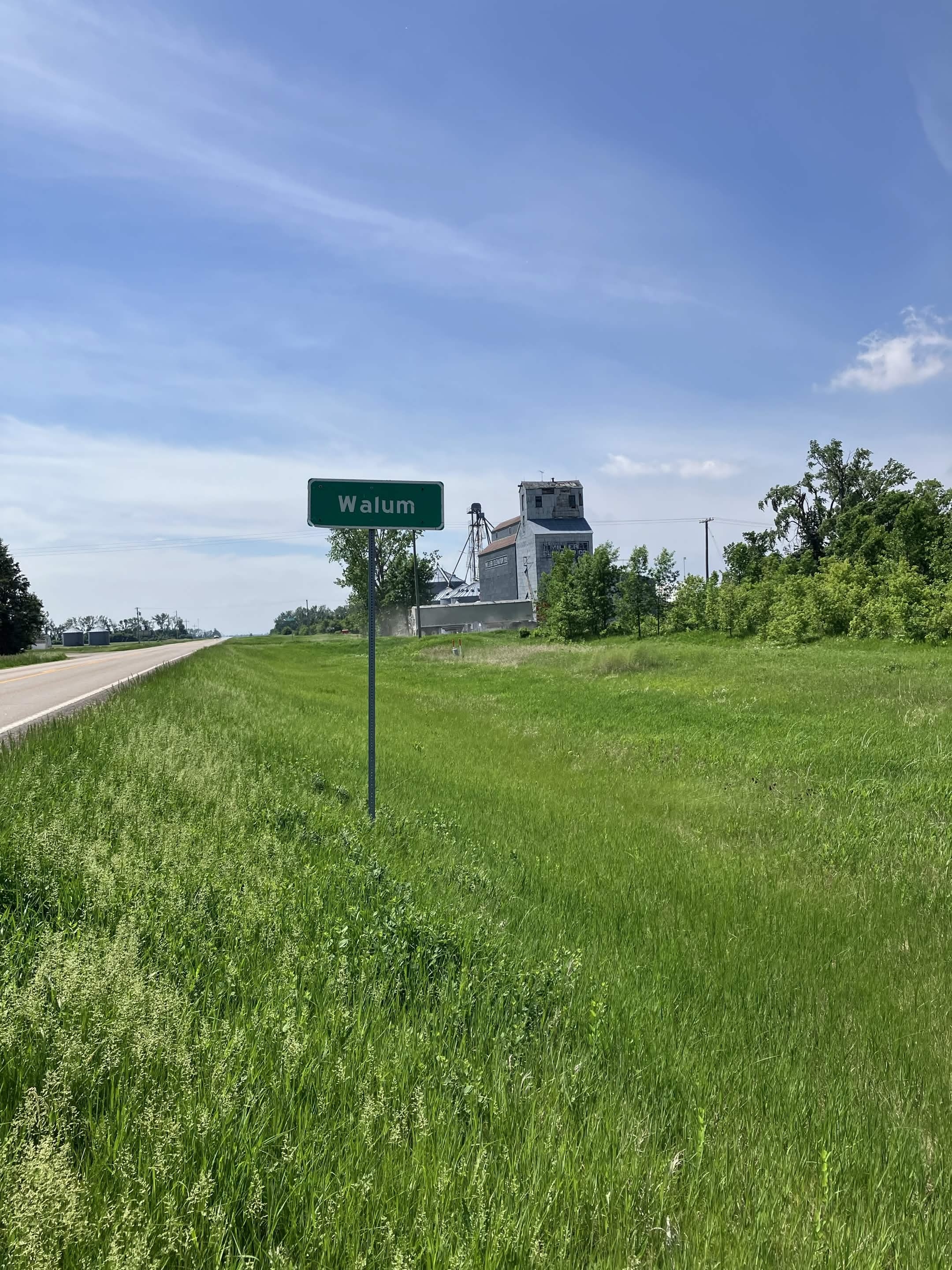

- Location within North Dakota
- Coordinates: 47°16′9″N 98°11′40″W
- Country: United States
- State: North Dakota
- County: Griggs County
- Elevation: 1,437 ft (438 m)
- GNIS feature ID: 1032680

Walum is an unincorporated community in Griggs County, North Dakota, United States.

== History ==
A post office called Walum was established in 1904, and remained in operation until 1973. The community was named for Marinus Wallum, an early settler.
