= Don Vigesaa =

American politician (born 1953)

Member of the North Dakota House of Representatives
- Incumbent
- Assumed office 2003
- Succeeded by: Kevin Wolsky (elect)
- Constituency: 23rd district (2003–2022); 29th district (2022–present)

Personal details
- Born: February 26, 1953 (age 73)
- Party: Republican

Donald Vigesaa (born February 26, 1953) is an American politician. He is a member of the North Dakota House of Representatives from the 29th District, serving since 2003. He is a member of the Republican party.

Vigesaa is a car dealer from Cooperstown.
