= Cooperstown, North Dakota =

- City
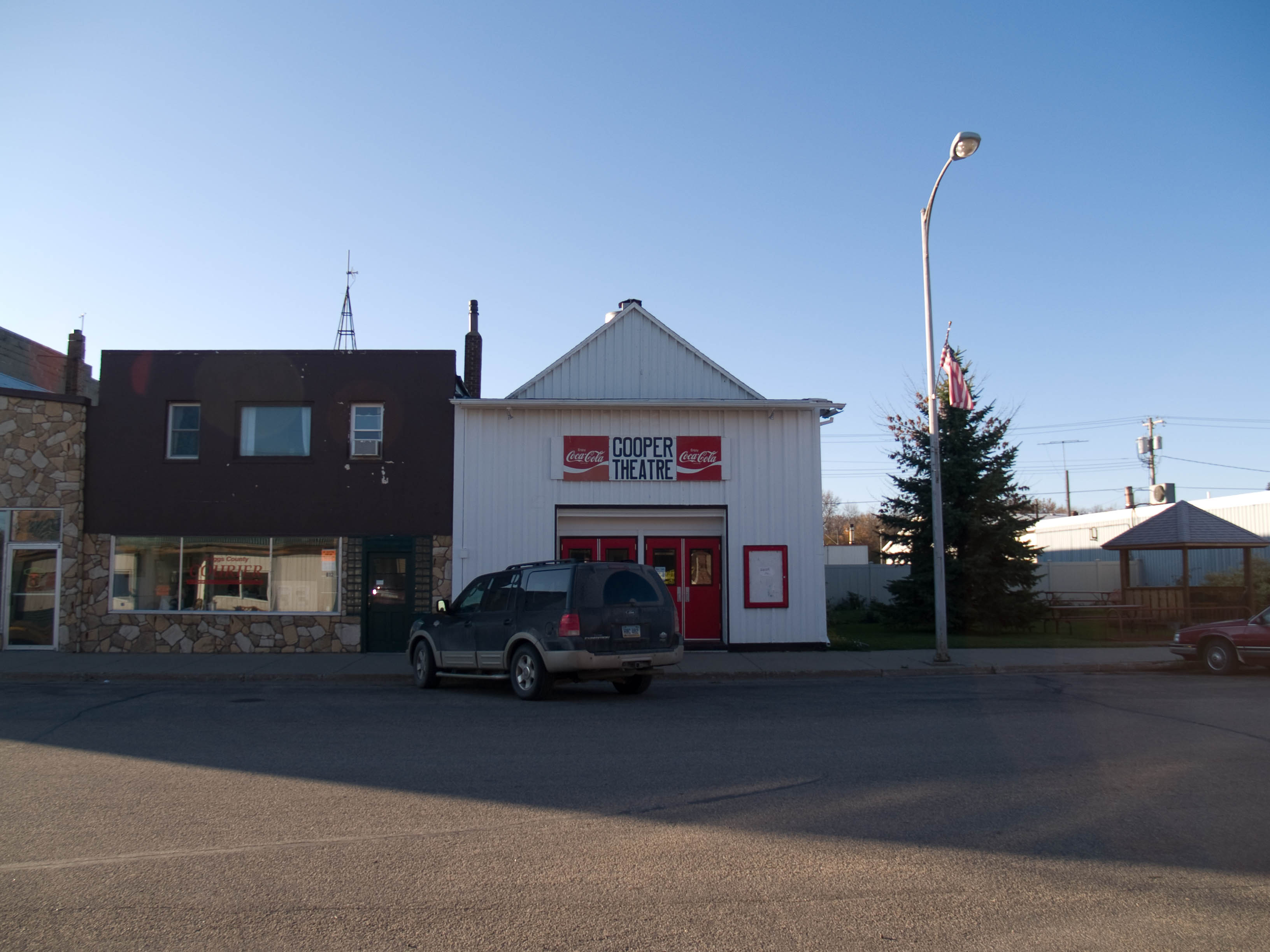
- Cooper Theatre in Cooperstown

- Logo
- Motto: "Unlimited Possibilities..."
- Location of Cooperstown, North Dakota

- Location in the United States
- Coordinates: 47°26′41″N 98°07′26″W
- Country: United States
- State: North Dakota
- County: Griggs
- Founded: 1882

Government
  - Mayor: Paul Paintner

Area
  - Total: 1.00 sq mi (2.60 km^{2})
  - Land: 1.00 sq mi (2.60 km^{2})
  - Water: 0 sq mi (0.00 km^{2})
- Elevation: 1,434 ft (437 m)

Population (2020)
  - Total: 983
  - Estimate (2022): 959
  - Density: 977.6/sq mi (377.45/km^{2})
- Time zone: UTC-6 (Central (CST))
  - Summer (DST): UTC-5 (CDT)
- ZIP code: 58425
- Area code: 701
- FIPS code: 38-15900
- GNIS feature ID: 1035978
- Highways: ND 45, ND 200
- Website: cooperstownnd.com

Cooperstown is a city in Griggs County, North Dakota, United States. It is the county seat of Griggs County. The population was 983 at the 2020 census. Cooperstown was founded in 1882.

== History ==
The city is named for R. C. Cooper, a bonanza farmer who built the first wood-frame house in the area in 1880. Prior to Cooper's arrival, most settlers or the era lived in sod houses, covered wagons, tents, or log cabins (especially near the Sheyenne River where trees were numerous). Cooperstown was laid out on October 26, 1882, soon before the railroad was extended to that point.

On November 7, 1882, the Griggs County Board of Commissioners voted to locate the county seat on one of Cooper's properties in Cooperstown. Prior to this, the county records were housed in Hope, North Dakota. The residents of Hope were determined that the county seat be located in their town and refused to surrender the records to Cooperstown. The County Commissioners forcibly removed the records by their next meeting on November 18. Sometime the following month, an armed party from Hope overpowered three guards in the new county office and returned the records to their town. In early 1883, the North Dakota Territorial Legislature created Steele County with Hope serving as the new county's seat. Hope returned Griggs County's record to Cooperstown after an election on June 2, 1883. The Griggs County Courthouse was built in 1884.

== Geography ==
According to the United States Census Bureau, the city has a total area of 0.97 square miles (2.51 km^{2}), all land.

== Climate ==
Cooperstown has a humid continental climate (Köppen Dwb), typical of east-central North Dakota. Winters are cold and snowy, while summers are warm and wetter. Precipitation is highest in the late spring and summer months, with an annual average of 21.34 in (542 mm).

Climate data for Cooperstown, North Dakota, 1991–2020 normals, 1903-2020 extremes: 1380ft (421m)
Month	Jan	Feb	Mar	Apr	May	Jun	Jul	Aug	Sep	Oct	Nov	Dec	Year
Record high °F (°C)	54 (12)	62 (17)	80 (27)	98 (37)	98 (37)	105 (41)	118 (48)	108 (42)	103 (39)	92 (33)	76 (24)	65 (18)	118 (48)
Mean maximum °F (°C)	39.6 (4.2)	43.0 (6.1)	55.2 (12.9)	78.4 (25.8)	86.0 (30.0)	88.9 (31.6)	91.8 (33.2)	92.5 (33.6)	87.3 (30.7)	77.1 (25.1)	57.9 (14.4)	40.9 (4.9)	95.1 (35.1)
Mean daily maximum °F (°C)	16.4 (−8.7)	21.0 (−6.1)	34.3 (1.3)	52.0 (11.1)	66.0 (18.9)	74.7 (23.7)	78.8 (26.0)	78.3 (25.7)	69.2 (20.7)	53.7 (12.1)	35.6 (2.0)	22.2 (−5.4)	50.2 (10.1)
Daily mean °F (°C)	6.7 (−14.1)	10.8 (−11.8)	24.5 (−4.2)	40.5 (4.7)	53.7 (12.1)	63.6 (17.6)	67.6 (19.8)	65.8 (18.8)	57.0 (13.9)	42.7 (5.9)	26.3 (−3.2)	13.0 (−10.6)	39.4 (4.1)
Mean daily minimum °F (°C)	−3.1 (−19.5)	0.6 (−17.4)	14.6 (−9.7)	29.0 (−1.7)	41.3 (5.2)	52.4 (11.3)	56.4 (13.6)	53.3 (11.8)	44.9 (7.2)	31.8 (−0.1)	17.0 (−8.3)	3.7 (−15.7)	28.5 (−1.9)
Mean minimum °F (°C)	−27.8 (−33.2)	−23.8 (−31.0)	−10.9 (−23.8)	13.8 (−10.1)	25.8 (−3.4)	38.6 (3.7)	44.3 (6.8)	40.0 (4.4)	27.7 (−2.4)	14.8 (−9.6)	−3.6 (−19.8)	−22.0 (−30.0)	−31.2 (−35.1)
Record low °F (°C)	−41 (−41)	−47 (−44)	−36 (−38)	−9 (−23)	13 (−11)	26 (−3)	34 (1)	30 (−1)	17 (−8)	−2 (−19)	−31 (−35)	−35 (−37)	−47 (−44)
Average precipitation inches (mm)	0.47 (12)	0.63 (16)	0.74 (19)	1.19 (30)	3.04 (77)	3.43 (87)	3.75 (95)	3.16 (80)	2.09 (53)	1.98 (50)	0.78 (20)	0.74 (19)	22 (558)
Average snowfall inches (cm)	8.40 (21.3)	7.00 (17.8)	7.50 (19.1)	2.50 (6.4)	0.50 (1.3)	0.10 (0.25)	0.00 (0.00)	0.00 (0.00)	0.00 (0.00)	1.10 (2.8)	5.90 (15.0)	9.70 (24.6)	42.7 (108.55)
Source 1: NOAA
Source 2: XMACIS (temp records & 1981-2010 monthly max/mins)

Climate data for Cooperstown, North Dakota (1981–2010)
Month	Jan	Feb	Mar	Apr	May	Jun	Jul	Aug	Sep	Oct	Nov	Dec	Year
Mean daily maximum °F (°C)	17.3 (−8.2)	23.4 (−4.8)	35.1 (1.7)	54.7 (12.6)	67.7 (19.8)	75.7 (24.3)	80.5 (26.9)	79.7 (26.5)	69.6 (20.9)	55.0 (12.8)	35.7 (2.1)	21.2 (−6.0)	51.3 (10.7)
Mean daily minimum °F (°C)	−2.0 (−18.9)	3.4 (−15.9)	16.5 (−8.6)	30.2 (−1.0)	42.2 (5.7)	52.2 (11.2)	56.6 (13.7)	54.4 (12.4)	44.5 (6.9)	32.0 (0.0)	17.4 (−8.1)	3.3 (−15.9)	29.2 (−1.6)
Average precipitation inches (mm)	0.46 (12)	0.51 (13)	1.02 (26)	1.18 (30)	2.95 (75)	3.43 (87)	3.58 (91)	2.89 (73)	2.11 (54)	1.87 (47)	0.74 (19)	0.60 (15)	21.34 (542)
Average snowfall inches (cm)	8.6 (22)	5.7 (14)	7.1 (18)	2.9 (7.4)	0.1 (0.25)	0.0 (0.0)	0.0 (0.0)	0.0 (0.0)	0.0 (0.0)	1.4 (3.6)	6.8 (17)	8.9 (23)	41.3 (105)
Source: NOAA

== Demographics ==
Historical population
Census	Pop.	Note	%±
1890	368		—
1900	648		76.1%
1910	1,019		57.3%
1920	1,112		9.1%
1930	1,053		−5.3%
1940	1,077		2.3%
1950	1,189		10.4%
1960	1,424		19.8%
1970	1,485		4.3%
1980	1,308		−11.9%
1990	1,247		−4.7%
2000	1,053		−15.6%
2010	984		−6.6%
2020	983		−0.1%
2022 (est.)	959		−2.4%
U.S. Decennial Census; 2020 Census

=== 2010 census ===
As of the census of 2010, there were 984 people, 477 households, and 254 families living in the city. The population density was 1,014.4 inhabitants per square mile (391.7/km^{2}). There were 543 housing units at an average density of 559.8 per square mile (216.1/km^{2}). The racial makeup of the city was 99.2% White, 0.2% African American, 0.1% Native American, 0.4% Asian, and 0.1% from other races. Hispanic or Latino of any race were 0.3% of the population.

There were 477 households, of which 21.0% had children under the age of 18 living with them, 44.2% were married couples living together, 4.8% had a female householder with no husband present, 4.2% had a male householder with no wife present, and 46.8% were non-families. 44.2% of all households were made up of individuals, and 24.1% had someone living alone who was 65 years of age or older. The average household size was 1.96 and the average family size was 2.69.

The median age in the city was 52.3 years. 19.9% of residents were under the age of 18; 3.8% were between the ages of 18 and 24; 18.1% were from 25 to 44; 28.4% were from 45 to 64; and 29.9% were 65 years of age or older. The gender makeup of the city was 47.0% male and 53.0% female.

=== 2000 census ===
As of the census of 2000, there were 1,053 people, 489 households, and 270 families living in the city. The population density was 1,128.2 inhabitants per square mile (435.6/km^{2}). There were 563 housing units at an average density of 603.2 per square mile (232.9/km^{2}). The racial makeup of the city was 98.86% White, 0.19% Native American, 0.28% Asian, 0.38% from other races, and 0.28% from two or more races. Hispanic or Latino of any race were 0.95% of the population.

There were 489 households, out of which 22.9% had children under the age of 18 living with them, 48.3% were married couples living together, 5.7% had a female householder with no husband present, and 44.6% were non-families. 42.3% of all households were made up of individuals, and 26.0% had someone living alone who was 65 years of age or older. The average household size was 2.04 and the average family size was 2.79.

In the city, the population was spread out, with 20.0% under the age of 18, 4.7% from 18 to 24, 20.3% from 25 to 44, 22.9% from 45 to 64, and 32.1% who were 65 years of age or older. The median age was 48 years. For every 100 females, there were 84.7 males. For every 100 females age 18 and over, there were 83.8 males.

The median income for a household in the city was $28,705, and the median income for a family was $41,307. Males had a median income of $26,688 versus $17,083 for females. The per capita income for the city was $17,334. About 5.5% of families and 10.5% of the population were below the poverty line, including 11.7% of those under age 18 and 11.2% of those age 65 or over.

== Notable people ==
- Dick Johnson, chief test pilot for Convair
- Gerald Nye, U.S. Senator from North Dakota
- Don Vigessa, North Dakota House of Representatives since 2003
