= Griggs County, North Dakota =

County in North Dakota, United States

- County
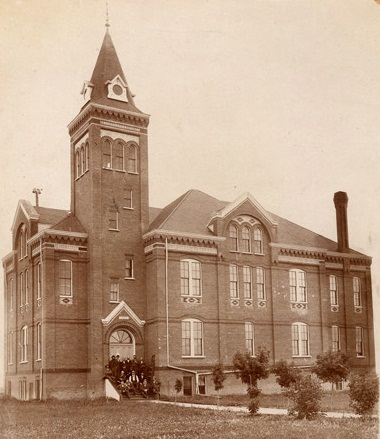
- The Griggs County Courthouse in Cooperstown. Photographed in 1892.

- Location within the U.S. state of North Dakota
- Coordinates: 47.456334°N 98.232286°W
- Country: United States
- State: North Dakota
- Founded: February 18, 1881 (created); June 16, 1882 (organized)
- Named for: Alexander Griggs
- Seat: Cooperstown
- Largest city: Cooperstown

Area
  - Total: 716.580 sq mi (1,855.93 km^{2})
  - Land: 708.685 sq mi (1,835.49 km^{2})
  - Water: 7.895 sq mi (20.45 km^{2}) 1.10%

Population (2020)
  - Total: 2,306
  - Estimate (2025): 2,239 ▼
  - Density: 3.142/sq mi (1.213/km^{2})
- Time zone: UTC−6 (Central)
  - Summer (DST): UTC−5 (CDT)
- Area code: 701
- Congressional district: At-large
- Website: griggscountynd.gov

Griggs County is a county in the U.S. state of North Dakota. As of the 2020 census, the population was 2,306. The county seat and the largest city is Cooperstown.

== History ==
The county was created by the Dakota Territory legislature on February 18, 1881, with territories partitioned from Barnes, Foster, and Traill counties. It was not organized at that time, nor was it attached to another county for administrative or judicial purposes. It was named for Alexander Griggs, a steamboat captain who is credited with founding Grand Forks.

The county organization was effected on June 16, 1882. Its boundary was altered in 1883 when Steele County was partitioned off; it has retained its present boundary since then.

The Conrad and Sylvia Fogderud farm in Griggs County is known as "Little Tornado Alley" due to the many tornadoes that have occurred there.

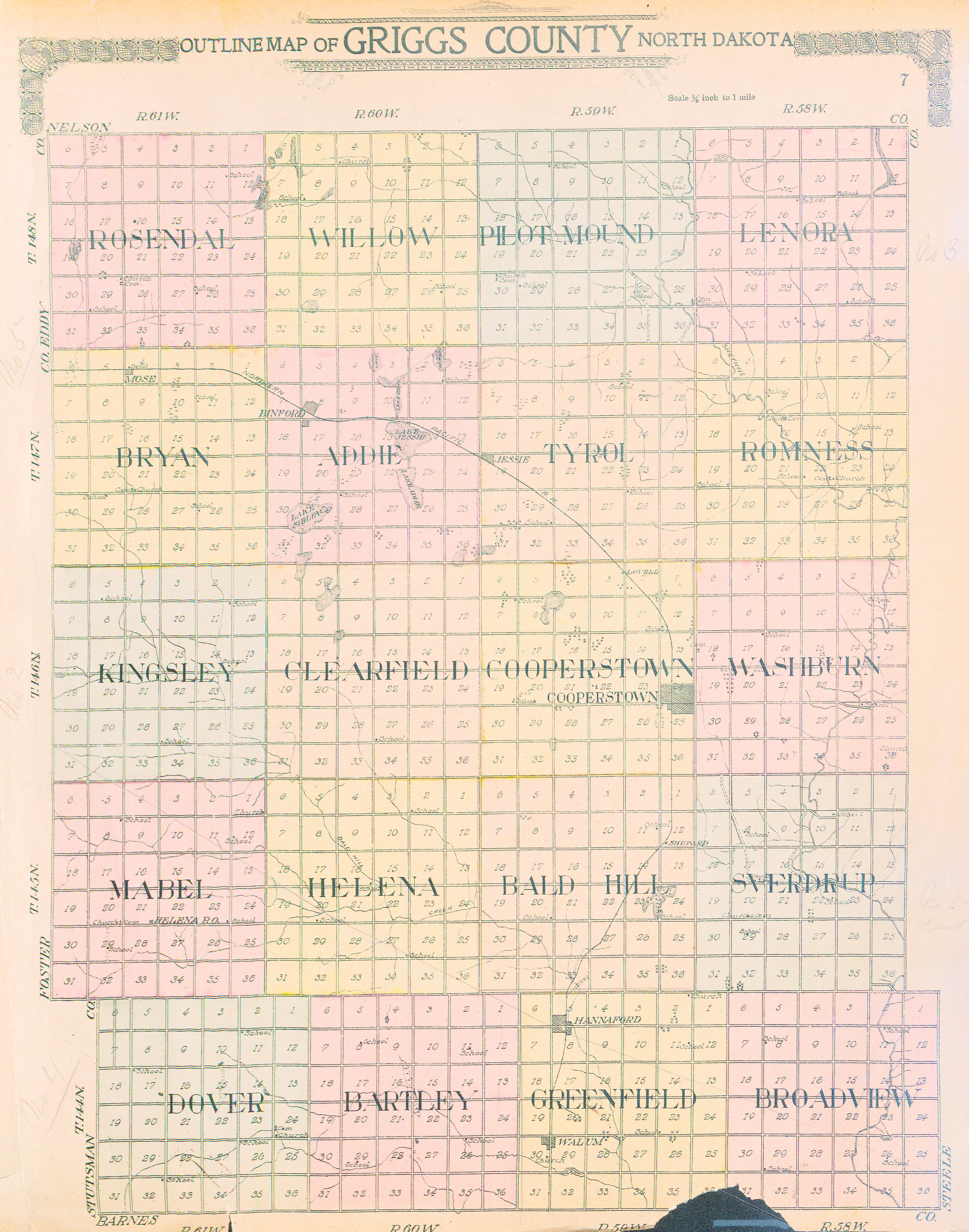
Outline map of Griggs County, North Dakota, 1910

== Geography ==
The Sheyenne River flows southward through the east-central part of Griggs County, discharging into Lake Ashtabula at the county's SE corner. The county terrain consists of low rolling hills, dotted with lakes and ponds across its central part, mostly devoted to agriculture. The terrain slopes to the south and east; its highest point is a hill at its NW corner, at 1,562' (476m) ASL.

According to the United States Census Bureau, the county has a total area of 716.580 square miles (1,855.93 km^{2}), of which 708.685 square miles (1,835.49 km^{2}) is land and 7.895 square miles (20.45 km^{2}) (1.10%) is water. It is the 51st largest county and the third-smallest county in North Dakota by total area.

=== Major highways ===
- North Dakota Highway 1
- North Dakota Highway 45
- North Dakota Highway 65
- North Dakota Highway 200

=== Adjacent counties ===
- Nelson County (north)
- Steele County (east)
- Barnes County (south)
- Stutsman County (southwest)
- Foster County (west)
- Eddy County (northwest)

=== National protected area ===
- Sibley Lake National Wildlife Refuge

=== Lakes ===
- Hoot-E-Too Lake
- Jones Lake
- Lake Addie
- Lake Ashtabula (part)
- Lake Five
- Lake Jessie
- Lake Norway
- Lake Silver
- Long Lake
- Phelps Lake
- Pickerel Lake (part)
- Plum Lake
- Red Willow Lake
- Round Lake
- Rush Lake
- Sibley Lake

== Demographics ==
Historical population
Census	Pop.	Note	%±
1890	2,817		—
1900	4,744		68.4%
1910	6,274		32.3%
1920	7,402		18.0%
1930	6,889		−6.9%
1940	5,818		−15.5%
1950	5,460		−6.2%
1960	5,023		−8.0%
1970	4,184		−16.7%
1980	3,714		−11.2%
1990	3,303		−11.1%
2000	2,754		−16.6%
2010	2,420		−12.1%
2020	2,306		−4.7%
2025 (est.)	2,239	▼	−2.9%
U.S. Decennial Census; 1790–1960 1900–1990; 1990–2000 2010–2020

As of the fourth quarter of 2024, the median home value in Griggs County was $135,835.

=== 2020 census ===
As of the 2020 census, the county had a population of 2,306. Of the residents, 20.8% were under the age of 18 and 30.2% were 65 years of age or older; the median age was 49.2 years. For every 100 females there were 101.9 males, and for every 100 females age 18 and over there were 104.8 males.

The racial makeup of the county was 95.6% White, 0.3% Black or African American, 0.5% American Indian and Alaska Native, 0.3% Asian, 0.3% from some other race, and 2.9% from two or more races. Hispanic or Latino residents of any race comprised 1.0% of the population.

There were 1,015 households in the county, of which 22.0% had children under the age of 18 living with them and 20.1% had a female householder with no spouse or partner present. About 36.6% of all households were made up of individuals and 19.1% had someone living alone who was 65 years of age or older.

There were 1,378 housing units, of which 26.3% were vacant. Among occupied housing units, 77.6% were owner-occupied and 22.4% were renter-occupied. The homeowner vacancy rate was 2.2% and the rental vacancy rate was 16.3%.

=== 2010 census ===
As of the census of 2010, there were 2,420 people, 1,131 households, and 694 families in the county. The population density was 3.4 inhabitants per square mile (1.3/km^{2}). There were 1,461 housing units at an average density of 2.1 per square mile (0.81/km^{2}). The racial makeup of the county was 98.8% white, 0.3% American Indian, 0.3% black or African American, 0.2% Asian, 0.2% from other races, and 0.2% from two or more races. Those of Hispanic or Latino origin made up 0.4% of the population.

In terms of ancestry, 60.8% were Norwegian, 36.7% were German, 5.9% were English, 5.6% were Swedish, and 1.2% were American.

There were 1,131 households, 20.8% had children under the age of 18 living with them, 53.9% were married couples living together, 4.2% had a female householder with no husband present, 38.6% were non-families, and 36.3% of all households were made up of individuals. The average household size was 2.10 and the average family size was 2.70. The median age was 51.9 years.

The median income for a household in the county was $40,085 and the median income for a family was $51,570. Males had a median income of $33,169 versus $27,038 for females. The per capita income for the county was $24,122. About 9.5% of families and 11.4% of the population were below the poverty line, including 11.4% of those under age 18 and 17.5% of those age 65 or over.

== Communities ==
=== Cities ===
- Binford
- Cooperstown (county seat)
- Hannaford

=== Census-designated places ===
- Jessie
- Sutton

=== Unincorporated communities ===
- Karnak
- Walum
- Mose

=== Townships ===
- Addie
- Ball Hill
- Bartley
- Broadview
- Bryan
- Clearfield
- Cooperstown
- Dover
- Greenfield
- Helena
- Kingsley
- Lenora
- Mabel
- Pilot Mound
- Romness
- Rosendal
- Sverdrup
- Tyrol
- Washburn
- Willow

Township Numbers and Range Numbers
	Range 61	Range 60	Range 59	Range 58
Township 148	Rosendal	Willow	Pilot Mound	Lenora
Township 147	Bryan	Addie	Tyrol	Romness
Township 146	Kingsley	Clearfield	Cooperstown	Washburn
Township 145	Mabel	Helena	Ball Hill	Sverdrup
Township 144	Dover	Bartley	Greenfield	Broadview

== Politics ==
Griggs County voters usually vote Republican. In only one national election since 1964 has the county selected the Democratic Party candidate.

United States presidential election results for Griggs County, North Dakota
Year	Republican		Democratic		Third party(ies)	
Year	No.	%	No.	%	No.	%
1900	527	54.44%	407	42.05%	34	3.51%
1904	688	66.80%	232	22.52%	110	10.68%
1908	605	51.84%	493	42.25%	69	5.91%
1912	144	14.47%	434	43.62%	417	41.91%
1916	521	40.86%	668	52.39%	86	6.75%
1920	1,739	73.84%	530	22.51%	86	3.65%
1924	738	33.33%	116	5.24%	1,360	61.43%
1928	1,329	52.45%	1,182	46.65%	23	0.91%
1932	428	18.01%	1,838	77.32%	111	4.67%
1936	666	24.46%	1,665	61.15%	392	14.40%
1940	1,117	43.09%	1,464	56.48%	11	0.42%
1944	990	44.45%	1,228	55.14%	9	0.40%
1948	1,036	44.31%	1,180	50.47%	122	5.22%
1952	1,727	66.19%	872	33.42%	10	0.38%
1956	1,212	50.78%	1,173	49.14%	2	0.08%
1960	1,278	49.90%	1,279	49.94%	4	0.16%
1964	885	37.03%	1,505	62.97%	0	0.00%
1968	1,110	49.84%	1,008	45.26%	109	4.89%
1972	1,312	58.10%	901	39.90%	45	1.99%
1976	1,086	48.01%	1,122	49.60%	54	2.39%
1980	1,342	61.84%	636	29.31%	192	8.85%
1984	1,254	59.89%	828	39.54%	12	0.57%
1988	1,020	54.11%	846	44.88%	19	1.01%
1992	773	44.02%	647	36.85%	336	19.13%
1996	731	46.53%	670	42.65%	170	10.82%
2000	920	62.63%	484	32.95%	65	4.42%
2004	907	63.03%	505	35.09%	27	1.88%
2008	682	51.90%	598	45.51%	34	2.59%
2012	771	57.41%	536	39.91%	36	2.68%
2016	847	66.96%	298	23.56%	120	9.49%
2020	907	72.56%	308	24.64%	35	2.80%
2024	963	74.71%	301	23.35%	25	1.94%

== Education ==
School districts include:

- Barnes County North Public School District 7
- Dakota Prairie Public School District 1
- Finley-Sharon Public School District 19
- Griggs County Central School District 18
- Hope-Page Public School District 85
- Midkota Public School District 7

Former:

- Hope Public School District 10 - Consolidated with Page district in 2020

== See also ==
- National Register of Historic Places listings in Griggs County, North Dakota
- USS Griggs (APA-110), U.S. Navy ship named for this county
