= Hannaford, North Dakota =

- City
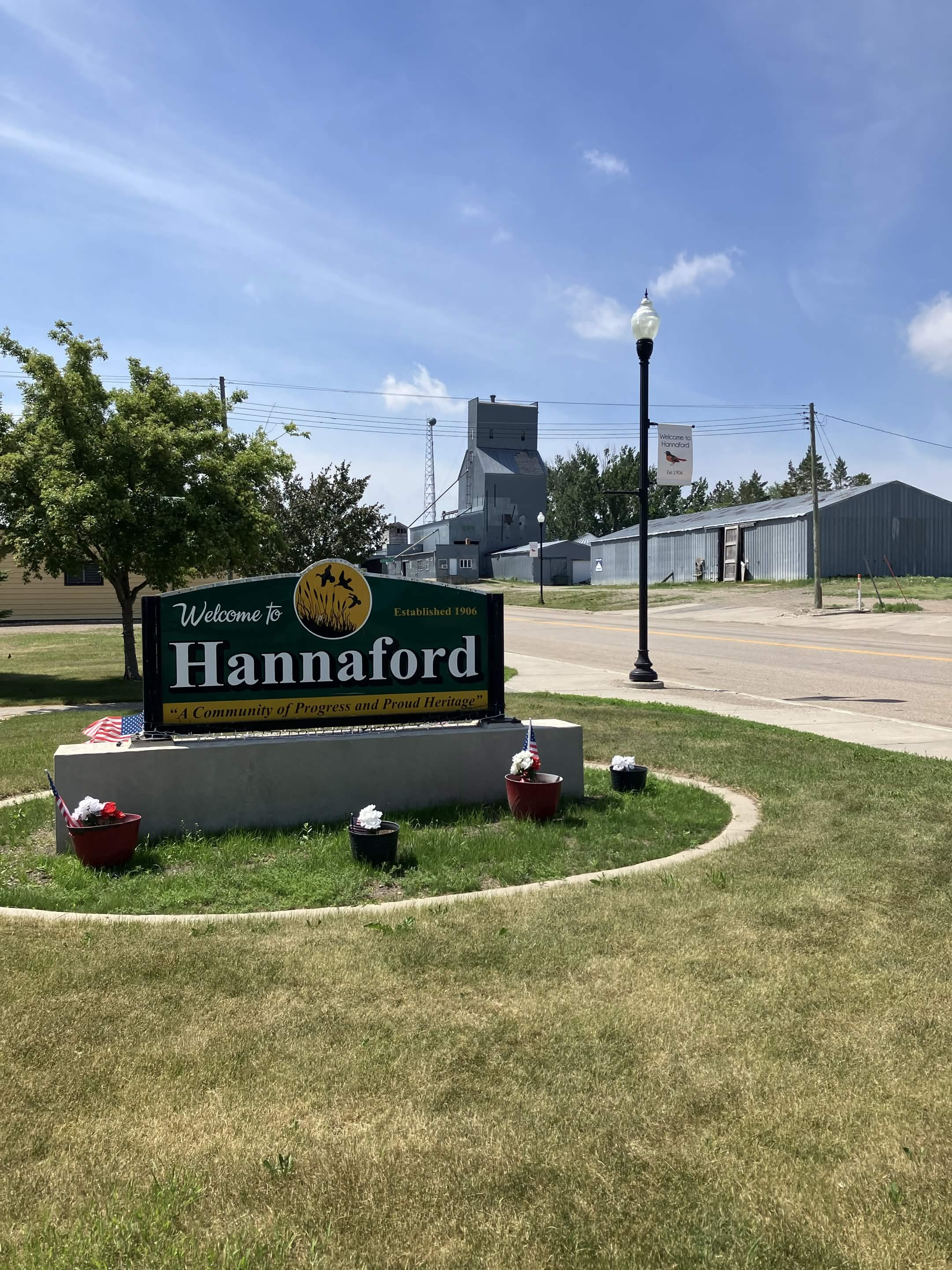
- Motto(s): "Focused Future, Proven Past"
- Location of Hannaford, North Dakota
- Coordinates: 47°18′51″N 98°11′20″W
- Country: United States
- State: North Dakota
- County: Griggs
- Founded: 1883

Government
  - Mayor: Debbie Dahl

Area
  - Total: 0.22 sq mi (0.57 km^{2})
  - Land: 0.22 sq mi (0.57 km^{2})
  - Water: 0 sq mi (0.00 km^{2})
- Elevation: 1,421 ft (433 m)

Population (2020)
  - Total: 126
  - Estimate (2022): 123
  - Density: 575.2/sq mi (222.09/km^{2})
- Time zone: UTC-6 (Central (CST))
  - Summer (DST): UTC-5 (CDT)
- ZIP code: 58448
- Area code: 701
- FIPS code: 38-35020
- GNIS feature ID: 1036079

Hannaford is a city in Griggs County, North Dakota, United States. The population was 126 at the 2020 census. Hannaford was founded in 1883.

== History ==
Hannaford was founded in 1883 when the railroad was extended to that point. The city was named in honor of J. M. Hannaford, a railroad official. A post office has been in operation at Hannaford since 1886.

== Geography ==
According to the United States Census Bureau, the city has a total area of 0.22 square miles (0.57 km^{2}), all land.

== Demographics ==
Historical population
Census	Pop.	Note	%±
1910	340		—
1920	431		26.8%
1930	351		−18.6%
1940	405		15.4%
1950	313		−22.7%
1960	277		−11.5%
1970	244		−11.9%
1980	201		−17.6%
1990	204		1.5%
2000	181		−11.3%
2010	131		−27.6%
2020	126		−3.8%
2022 (est.)	123		−2.4%
U.S. Decennial Census; 2020 Census

=== 2010 census ===
As of the census of 2010, there were 131 people, 65 households, and 35 families residing in the city. The population density was 595.5 inhabitants per square mile (229.9/km^{2}). There were 79 housing units at an average density of 359.1 per square mile (138.6/km^{2}). The racial makeup of the city was 97.7% White and 2.3% Native American.

There were 65 households, of which 16.9% had children under the age of 18 living with them, 47.7% were married couples living together, 4.6% had a female householder with no husband present, 1.5% had a male householder with no wife present, and 46.2% were non-families. 43.1% of all households were made up of individuals, and 23.1% had someone living alone who was 65 years of age or older. The average household size was 2.02 and the average family size was 2.74.

The median age in the city was 51.9 years. 16.8% of residents were under the age of 18; 3.1% were between the ages of 18 and 24; 16% were from 25 to 44; 35.8% were from 45 to 64; and 28.2% were 65 years of age or older. The gender makeup of the city was 54.2% male and 45.8% female.

=== 2000 census ===
As of the census of 2000, there were 181 people, 79 households, and 51 families residing in the city. The population density was 842.8 inhabitants per square mile (325.4/km^{2}). There were 85 housing units at an average density of 395.8 per square mile (152.8/km^{2}). The racial makeup of the city was 99.45% White and 0.55% Native American.

There were 79 households, out of which 22.8% had children under the age of 18 living with them, 57.0% were married couples living together, 5.1% had a female householder with no husband present, and 34.2% were non-families. 31.6% of all households were made up of individuals, and 15.2% had someone living alone who was 65 years of age or older. The average household size was 2.29 and the average family size was 2.85.

In the city, the population was spread out, with 21.5% under the age of 18, 5.0% from 18 to 24, 21.0% from 25 to 44, 30.9% from 45 to 64, and 21.5% who were 65 years of age or older. The median age was 47 years. For every 100 females, there were 115.5 males. For every 100 females age 18 and over, there were 108.8 males.

The median income for a household in the city was $32,188, and the median income for a family was $42,500. Males had a median income of $27,500 versus $15,000 for females. The per capita income for the city was $17,716. About 10.0% of families and 11.7% of the population were below the poverty line, including none of those under the age of eighteen and 20.5% of those 65 or over.
