= Sharon, North Dakota =

- City
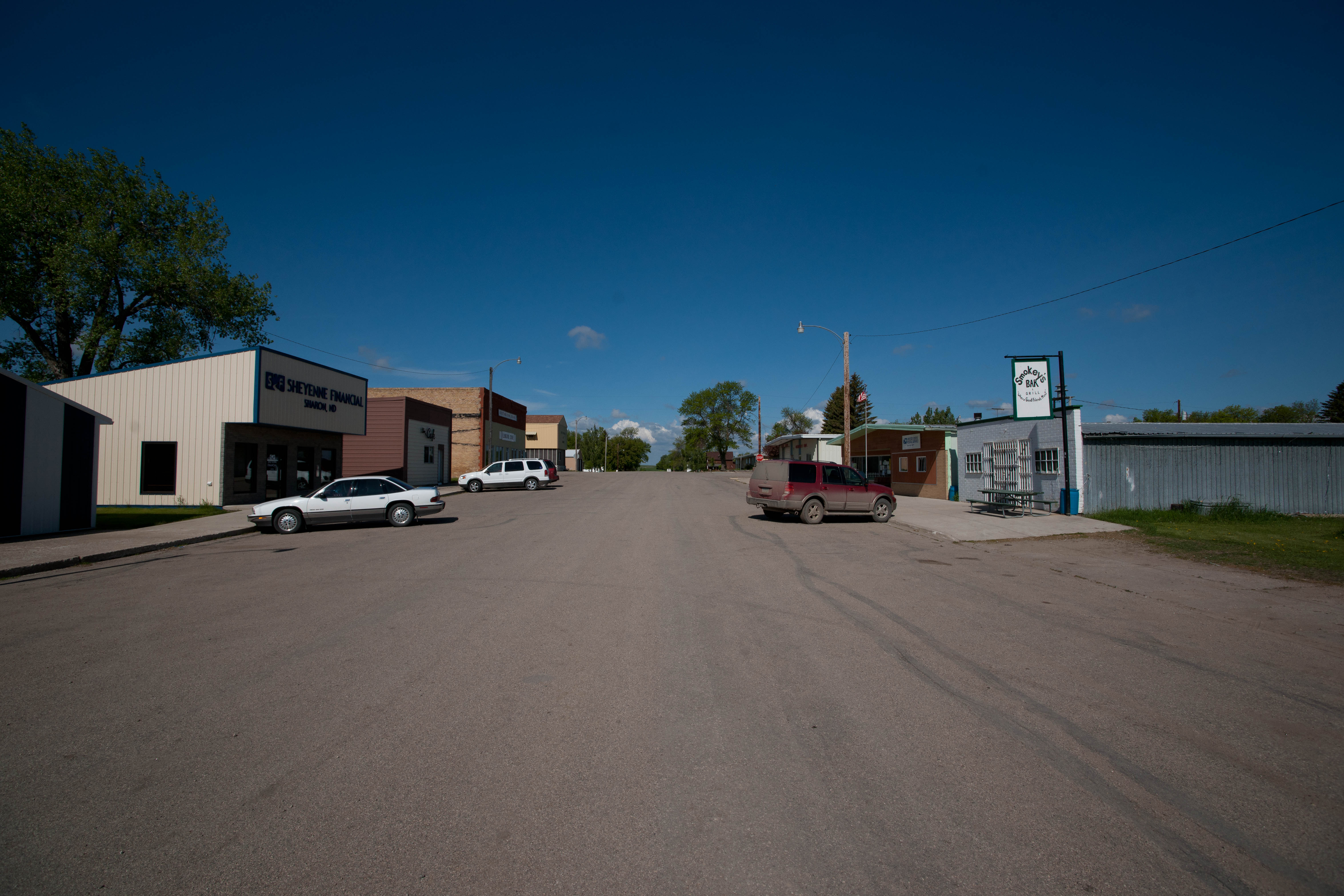
- Street scene in Sharon, North Dakota
- Interactive map of Sharon, North Dakota
- Location within North Dakota
- Coordinates: 47.5972°N 97.8987°W
- Country: United States
- State: North Dakota
- County: Steele
- Founded: 1896

Area
  - Total: 1.498 sq mi (3.880 km^{2})
  - Land: 1.486 sq mi (3.848 km^{2})
  - Water: 0.012 sq mi (0.032 km^{2}) 0.80%
- Elevation: 1,510 ft (460 m)

Population (2020)
  - Total: 86
  - Estimate (2025): 89
  - Density: 58/sq mi (22/km^{2})
- Time zone: UTC–6 (Central (CST))
  - Summer (DST): UTC–5 (CDT)
- ZIP Code: 58277
- Area code: 701
- FIPS code: 38-71940
- GNIS feature ID: 1036259

Sharon is a city in Steele County, North Dakota, United States. The population was 86 as of the 2020 census, and was estimated at 89 in 2025.

== History ==
Sharon was founded in 1896.

== Geography ==
According to the United States Census Bureau, the city has a total area of 1.498 square miles (3.88 km^{2}), of which 1.486 square miles (3.85 km^{2}) is land and 0.012 square miles (0.031 km^{2}) (0.80%) is water.

== Climate ==
This climatic region is typified by large seasonal temperature differences, with warm to hot (and often humid) summers and cold (sometimes severely cold) winters. According to the Köppen Climate Classification system, Sharon has a humid continental climate, abbreviated "Dfb" on climate maps.

== Demographics ==
Historical population
Census	Pop.	Note	%±
1910	304		—
1920	362		19.1%
1930	328		−9.4%
1940	371		13.1%
1950	312		−15.9%
1960	251		−19.6%
1970	201		−19.9%
1980	166		−17.4%
1990	119		−28.3%
2000	109		−8.4%
2010	96		−11.9%
2020	86		−10.4%
2025 (est.)	89		3.5%
U.S. Decennial Census; 2020 Census

=== 2020 census ===
As of the 2020 census, there were 86 people, 40 households, and 20 families residing in the city. The population density was 57.87 inhabitants per square mile (22.3/km^{2}). There were 59 housing units at an average density of 39.70 per square mile (15.3/km^{2}). The racial makeup of the city was 96.51% White, 0.00% African American, 0.00% Native American, 0.00% Asian, 2.33% Pacific Islander, 0.00% from some other races and 1.16% from two or more races. Hispanic or Latino people of any race were 2.33% of the population.

=== 2010 census ===
As of the 2010 census, there were 96 people, 46 households, and 29 families residing in the city. The population density was 62.22 inhabitants per square mile (24.0/km^{2}). There were 73 housing units at an average density of 47.31 per square mile (18.3/km^{2}). The racial makeup of the city was 93.75% White and 6.25% Native American.

There were 46 households, of which 26.1% had children under the age of 18 living with them, 50.0% were married couples living together, 10.9% had a female householder with no husband present, 2.2% had a male householder with no wife present, and 37.0% were non-families. 37.0% of all households were made up of individuals, and 19.5% had someone living alone who was 65 years of age or older. The average household size was 2.09 and the average family size was 2.69.

The median age in the city was 52.5 years. 25% of residents were under the age of 18; 2.2% were between the ages of 18 and 24; 14.6% were from 25 to 44; 31.3% were from 45 to 64; and 27.1% were 65 years of age or older. The gender makeup of the city was 52.1% male and 47.9% female.

=== 2000 census ===
As of the 2000 census, there were 109 people, 57 households, and 29 families residing in the city. The population density was 70.6 inhabitants per square mile (27.3/km^{2}). There were 76 housing units at an average density of 49.3 per square mile (19.0/km^{2}). The racial makeup of the city was 94.50% White, 1.83% Native American, and 3.67% from two or more races.

There were 57 households, out of which 15.8% had children under the age of 18 living with them, 50.9% were married couples living together, 1.8% had a female householder with no husband present, and 47.4% were non-families. 45.6% of all households were made up of individuals, and 22.8% had someone living alone who was 65 years of age or older. The average household size was 1.91 and the average family size was 2.70.

In the city, the population was spread out, with 16.5% under the age of 18, 5.5% from 18 to 24, 15.6% from 25 to 44, 33.0% from 45 to 64, and 29.4% who were 65 years of age or older. The median age was 51 years. For every 100 females, there were 127.1 males. For every 100 females age 18 and over, there were 127.5 males.

The median income for a household in the city was $24,583, and the median income for a family was $43,125. Males had a median income of $27,500 versus $18,750 for females. The per capita income for the city was $19,818. There were no families and 7.4% of the population living below the poverty line, including none under 18 and 4.5% of those over 64.

== Notable person ==
- Hjalmar Carl Nygaard, U.S. Representative, born on nearby farm
