= Aneta, North Dakota =

City in North Dakota, United States

- City
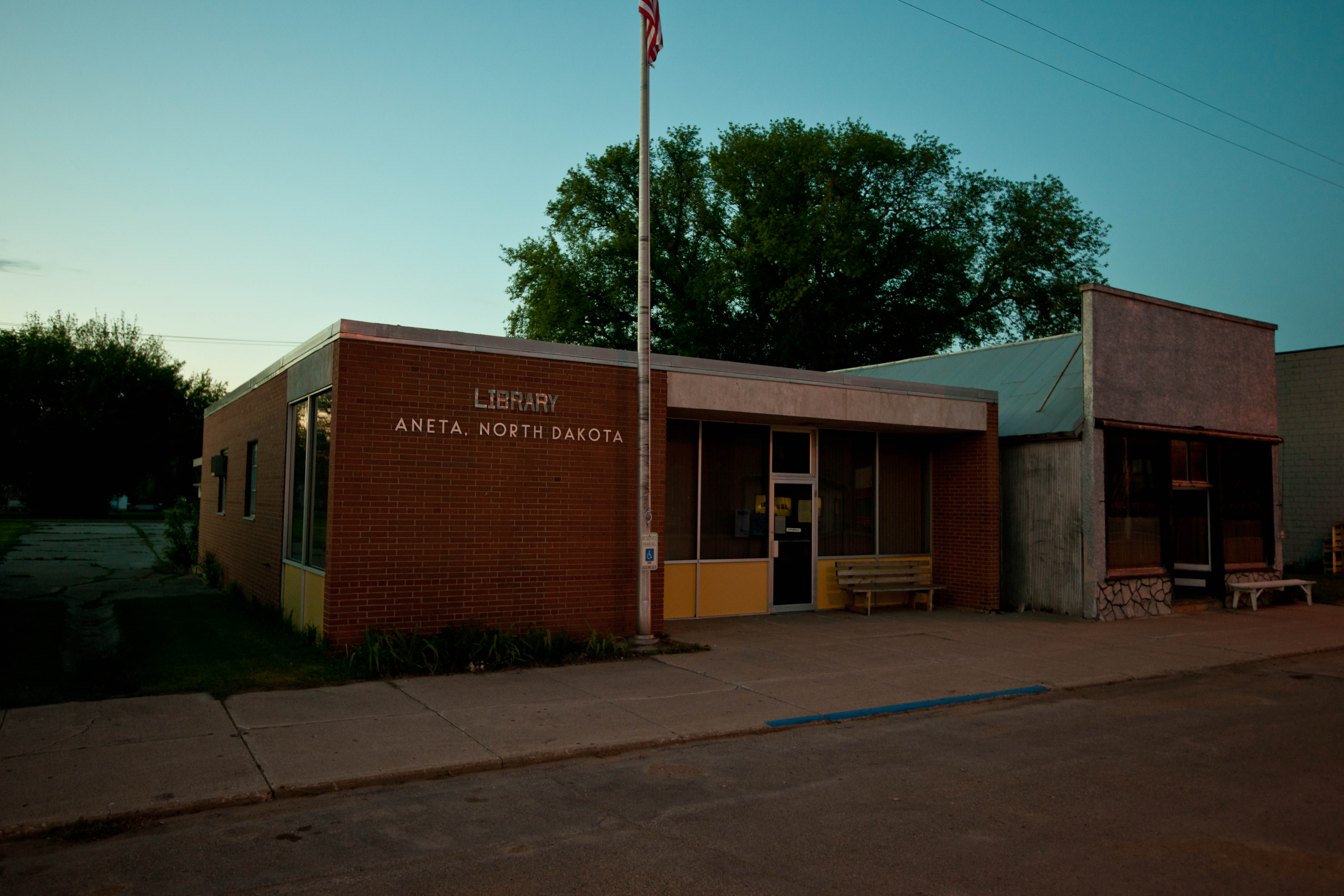
- Library in Aneta
- Nickname: The Queen City of the Upper Sheyenne
- Motto: Queen City
- Interactive map of Aneta, North Dakota
- Location within North Dakota
- Coordinates: 47.6797°N 97.9890°W
- Country: United States
- State: North Dakota
- County: Nelson
- First settled: 1882
- Incorporated (village): October 1897
- Incorporated (city): May 14, 1903
- Named for: Anna Roseta Mitchell

Government
  - Mayor: Todd Whitman

Area
  - Total: 0.999 sq mi (2.587 km^{2})
  - Land: 0.995 sq mi (2.578 km^{2})
  - Water: 0.0039 sq mi (0.010 km^{2}) 0.40%
- Elevation: 1,510 ft (460 m)

Population (2020)
  - Total: 234
  - Estimate (2025): 233
  - Density: 235/sq mi (90.8/km^{2})
- Time zone: UTC–6 (Central (CST))
  - Summer (DST): UTC–5 (CDT)
- ZIP Code: 58212
- Area code: 701
- FIPS code: 38-02380
- GNIS feature ID: 1035911

Aneta is a city in Nelson County, North Dakota, United States. The population was 234 as of the 2020 census, and was estimated at 233 in 2025.

== History ==
Aneta was first settled in 1882. It was named after Anna Roseta Mitchell, the first woman settler in the community. Because the Sheyenne River flows nearby, the town was nicknamed, "The Queen City of the Upper Sheyenne." Aneta's Post Office was established in 1883. In 1896, a railway station was established when the Great Northern Railroad extended a branch line 28 miles from Hope to Aneta. The city then quickly became a boomtown.

Aneta was incorporated as a village in October 1897 and as a city on May 14, 1903.

In the first election, 100 residents voted in the election – 59 for, 39 against, and two spoiled votes. A subsequent election for mayor (held in Thayer Hall) resulted in Mayor George F. Thayer. Municipal services were provided to residents as follows: school in 1896, telephone in 1899, electric lights in 1912, civic auditorium in 1927, municipal water in 1956, municipal sewer in 1960, and paved streets in 1965.

== Geography ==
According to the United States Census Bureau, the city has an area of 0.999 square miles (2.59 km^{2}), of which 0.995 square miles (2.58 km^{2}) is land and 0.004 square miles (0.01 km^{2}) (0.40%) is water.

== Demographics ==
Historical population
Census	Pop.	Note	%±
1910	654		—
1920	662		1.2%
1930	568		−14.2%
1940	509		−10.4%
1950	469		−7.9%
1960	451		−3.8%
1970	376		−16.6%
1980	341		−9.3%
1990	314		−7.9%
2000	284		−9.6%
2010	222		−21.8%
2020	234		5.4%
2025 (est.)	233		−0.4%
U.S. Decennial Census; 2020 Census

=== 2020 census ===
As of the 2020 census, there were 234 people, 105 households, and 55 families residing in the city.

=== 2010 census ===
As of the 2010 census, there were 222 people, 107 households, and 53 families residing in the city. The population density was 224.2 inhabitants per square mile (86.6/km^{2}). There were 142 housing units at an average density of 143.4 per square mile (55.4/km^{2}). The racial makeup of the city was 96.8% White, 0.9% Native American, and 2.3% from two or more races. Hispanic or Latino people of any race were 0.9% of the population.

There were 107 households, of which 14.0% had children under the age of 18 living with them, 34.6% were married couples living together, 9.3% had a female householder with no husband present, 5.6% had a male householder with no wife present, and 50.5% were non-families. 47.7% of all households were made up of individuals, and 27.1% had someone living alone who was 65 years of age or older. The average household size was 1.73 and the average family size was 2.36.

The median age in the city was 60.7 years. 9.9% of residents were under the age of 18; 7.8% were between the ages of 18 and 24; 10.4% were from 25 to 44; 27.5% were from 45 to 64; and 44.6% were 65 years of age or older. The gender makeup of the city was 50.9% male and 49.1% female.

=== 2000 census ===
As of the 2000 census, there were 284 people, 124 households, and 62 families residing in the city. The population density was 288.8 inhabitants per square mile (111.5/km^{2}). There were 155 housing units at an average density of 157.6 per square mile (60.8/km^{2}). The racial makeup of the city was 97.54% White, 1.06% Native American, 0.70% Asian, 0.35% from other races, and 0.35% from two or more races. Hispanic or Latino people of any race were 0.70% of the population.

The top 6 ancestry groups in the city are Norwegian (46.1%), German (13.7%), Swedish (6.3%), English (3.9%), Irish (2.8%), Italian (1.8%).

There were 124 households, out of which 14.5% had children under the age of 18 living with them, 41.9% were married couples living together, 6.5% had a female householder with no husband present, and 49.2% were non-families. 46.8% of all households were made up of individuals, and 27.4% had someone living alone who was 65 years of age or older. The average household size was 1.82 and the average family size was 2.49.

In the city, the population was spread out, with 16.5% under the age of 18, 3.9% from 18 to 24, 18.3% from 25 to 44, 18.7% from 45 to 64, and 42.6% who were 65 years of age or older. The median age was 60 years. For every 100 females, there were 102.9 males. For every 100 females age 18 and over, there were 86.6 males.

The median income for a household in the city was $24,792, and the median income for a family was $33,125. Males had a median income of $25,500 versus $15,625 for females. The per capita income for the city was $14,848. About 7.8% of families and 14.7% of the population were below the poverty line, including 8.6% of those under the age of eighteen and 4.0% of those 65 or over.
