= Binford, North Dakota =

- City
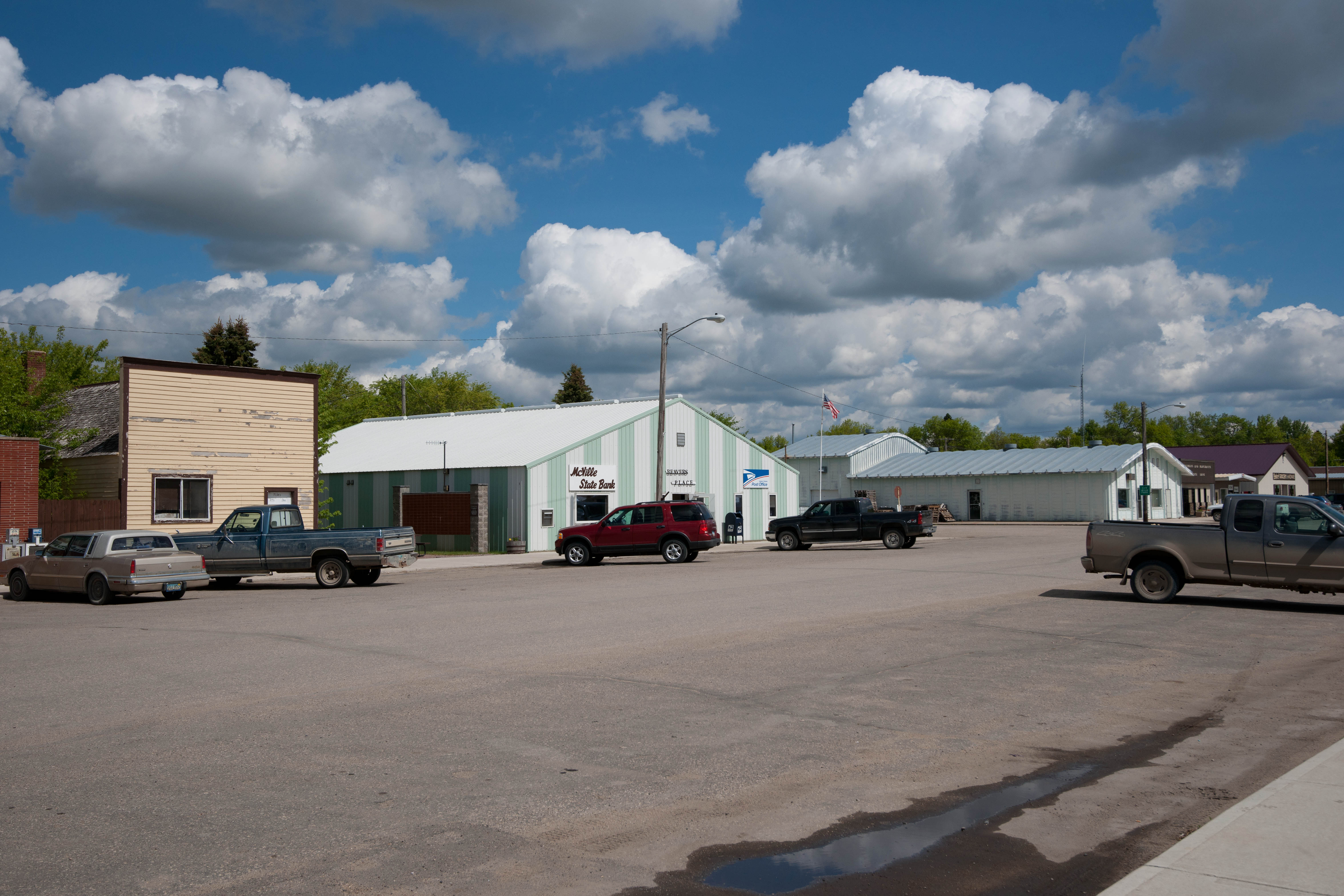
- Central Binford, June 2009

- Location of Binford, North Dakota
- Coordinates: 47°33′38″N 98°20′44″W
- Country: United States
- State: North Dakota
- County: Griggs
- Founded: 1899

Area
  - Total: 0.35 sq mi (0.91 km^{2})
  - Land: 0.35 sq mi (0.91 km^{2})
  - Water: 0 sq mi (0.00 km^{2})
- Elevation: 1,522 ft (464 m)

Population (2020)
  - Total: 170
  - Estimate (2022): 163
  - Density: 481.5/sq mi (185.89/km^{2})
- Time zone: UTC-6 (Central (CST))
  - Summer (DST): UTC-5 (CDT)
- ZIP code: 58416
- Area code: 701
- FIPS code: 38-07020
- GNIS feature ID: 1035932

Binford is a city in Griggs County, North Dakota, United States. The population was 170 at the 2020 census. Binford was founded in 1899.

== History ==
The Johnson Land Company of Iowa purchased a flax field owned by Gabriel Gabrielson when the Northern Pacific Railway laid its tracks in 1899. The town of "Blooming Prairie" was renamed Binford after attorney Ray Binford of Charles City, Iowa who handled the Land Company's purchase.

In the fall of 1899, a lumberyard and general store opened. A hotel was built in 1900. In 1905, Binford had its own newspaper, a bank, grain elevator, a hardware store, two groceries, a couple of pool hall-bowling alleys, two churches, and various other establishments.

== Geography ==
According to the United States Census Bureau, the city has a total area of 0.35 square miles (0.91 km^{2}), all land.

The city is located approximately one mile west of North Dakota Highway 1, which is one of the busier ND highways.

== Culture and economics ==
The city holds an annual celebration each year in June known as "Binford Days". The festivities usually include street vendors, kids games, a 5K Fun Run/Walk, parade, classic car show, silent auction, a supper & pie social, and a late night street dance. The event also includes the annual Binford Bull Ride, a sanctioned Professional Bull Riders (PBR) event, and once included rodeo clown Flint Rasmussen. The most recent estimates for attendance at this event are in the neighborhood of 2,500–3,000 spectators. Binford has been hosting this PBR event since 1999.

== Demographics ==
Historical population
Census	Pop.	Note	%±
1910	275		—
1920	393		42.9%
1930	317		−19.3%
1940	311		−1.9%
1950	309		−0.6%
1960	261		−15.5%
1970	242		−7.3%
1980	293		21.1%
1990	233		−20.5%
2000	201		−13.7%
2010	183		−9.0%
2020	170		−7.1%
2022 (est.)	163		−4.1%
U.S. Decennial Census; 2020 Census

=== 2010 census ===
As of the census of 2010, there were 183 people, 99 households, and 51 families residing in the city. The population density was 522.9 inhabitants per square mile (201.9/km^{2}). There were 125 housing units at an average density of 357.1 per square mile (137.9/km^{2}). The racial makeup of the city was 100.0% White. Hispanic or Latino of any race were 0.5% of the population.

There were 99 households, of which 15.2% had children under the age of 18 living with them, 42.4% were married couples living together, 7.1% had a female householder with no husband present, 2.0% had a male householder with no wife present, and 48.5% were non-families. 48.5% of all households were made up of individuals, and 27.3% had someone living alone who was 65 years of age or older. The average household size was 1.85 and the average family size was 2.59.

The median age in the city was 54.5 years. 14.8% of residents were under the age of 18; 6% were between the ages of 18 and 24; 15.9% were from 25 to 44; 33.9% were from 45 to 64; and 29.5% were 65 years of age or older. The gender makeup of the city was 50.3% male and 49.7% female.

=== 2000 census ===
As of the census of 2000, there were 201 people, 94 households, and 57 families residing in the city. The population density was 573.4 inhabitants per square mile (221.4/km^{2}). There were 120 housing units at an average density of 342.3/sq mi (132.4/km^{2}). The racial makeup of the city was 100.00% white.

There were 94 households, out of which 25.5% had children under the age of 18 living with them, 5.2% were married couples living together, 66.4% had a householder with no husband present, and 38.3% were non-families. 35.1% of all households were made up of individuals, and 27.7% had someone living in town alone who was 65 years of age or older. The average household size was 2.14 and the average family size was 2.79.

In the city, the population was spread out, with 20.9% under the age of 18, 6.0% from 18 to 24, 19.4% from 25 to 44, 20.9% from 45 to 64, and 32.8% who were 65 years of age or older. The median age was 47 years. For every 100 females age 18 and over, there were 78.7 males.

The median income for a household in the city was $25,375, and the median income for a family was $30,000. Males had a median income of $25,938 versus $18,125 for females. Plus support income from the military. The per capita income for the city was $14,459. About 3.3% of families and 5.0% of the population were below the poverty line, including none of those under the age of eighteen and 5.3% of those 65 or over.

== Notable person ==
- Alfred Eggermont, appeared on the show Master Chef Junior Season 9
- Thomas Ryum Amlie, U.S. Congressman from Wisconsin
