= Fifth principal meridian =

US survey line

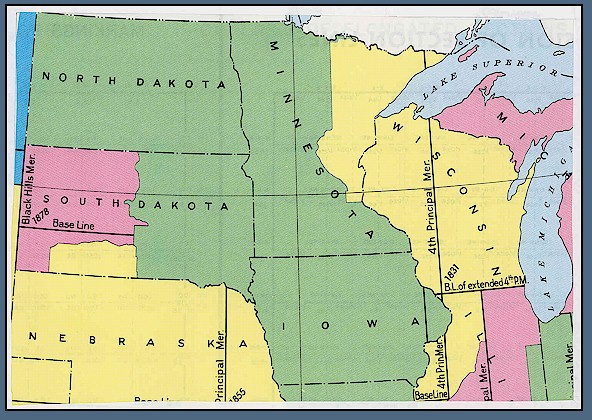

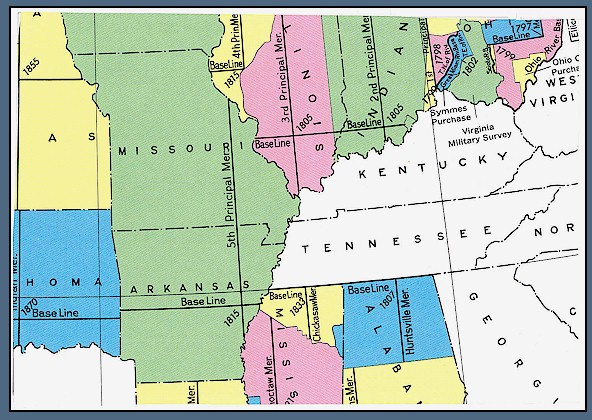
U.S. Bureau of Land Management maps showing the fifth principal meridian, north and south

The Fifth Principal Meridian, also known as the "5th Principal Meridian" and "PM 05", is a principal meridian survey line used in the United States for land claims in the Public Land Survey System (PLSS). It was first surveyed in 1815. The meridian, a north-south line, starts from the old mouth of the Arkansas River and runs north. Another survey line related to it is the base line running west from the old mouth of the St. Francis River. These survey lines govern all land surveys in four states and a large portion of the land surveys for two more. Monuments have been erected where the two lines meet at 34°38′44″N 91°3′42″W, and the surveyors' skill has been commemorated at the Louisiana Purchase State Park in eastern Arkansas. The Fifth Principal Meridian is nearly coincident with 91° 3′ 42″ longitude west from the Greenwich meridian.

In Arkansas, Missouri, Iowa, and North Dakota, it is the sole principal meridian used in the PLSS. It is used in Minnesota west of the Mississippi River and west of the third guide meridian north of the river. In South Dakota the meridian covers roughly the eastern half of the state: all land east of the Missouri River plus the surveys on the west side of the river to a limiting line following the third guide meridian of the sixth principal meridian system, White River, and the west and north boundaries of the Lower Brule Indian Reservation.

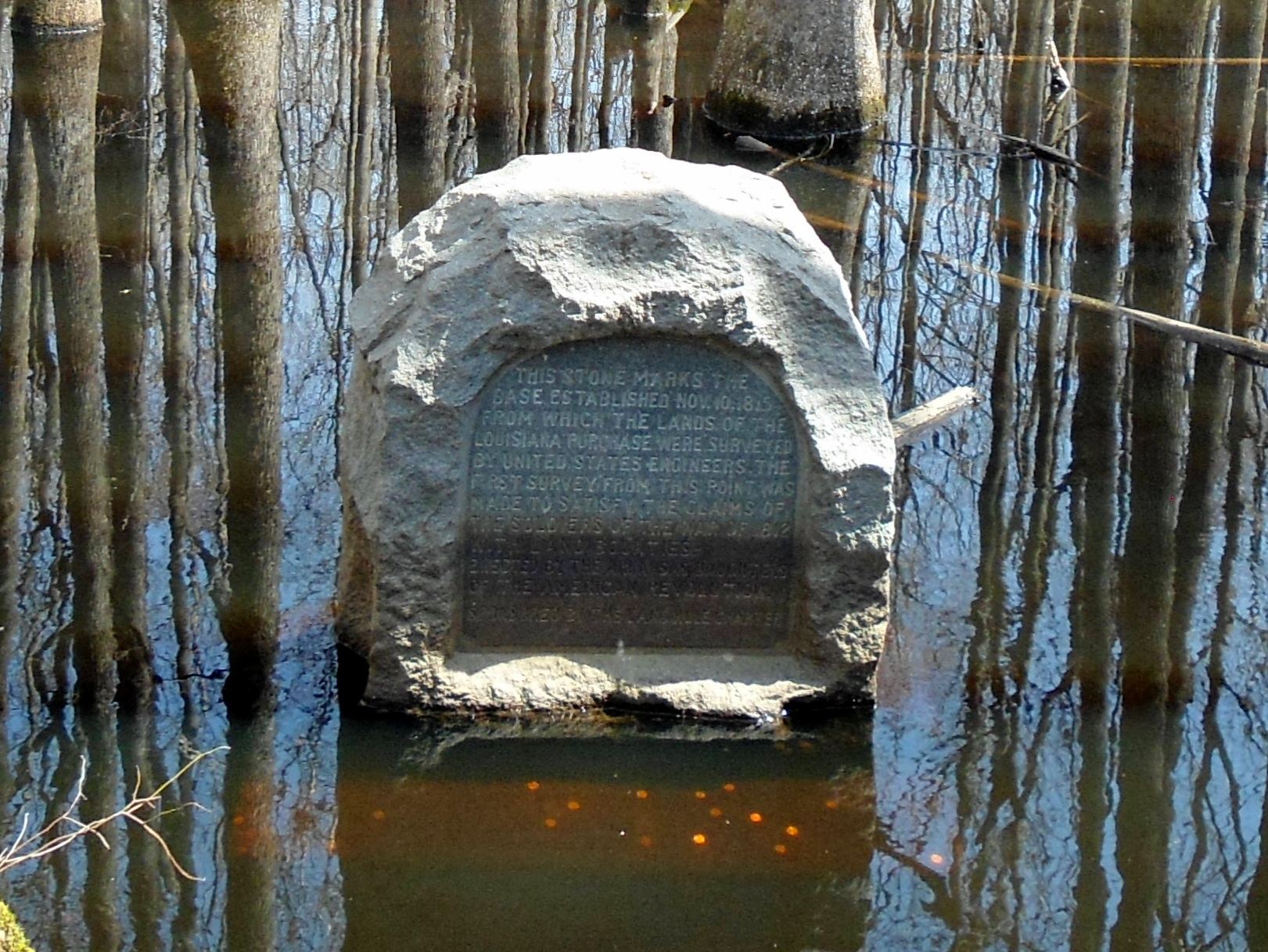
Marker at the point of beginning in a headwater swamp in Arkansas

This was the first meridian of the new Louisiana Purchase, which covered about 2,000,000 acres (8,100 km^{2}). There was much discussion regarding where the baseline would be, with the primary candidate originally being an extension of the Third principal meridian baseline. However, it was ultimately decided to use the confluence of the St. Francis River and the Mississippi River for the base line, and the confluence of the Arkansas and Mississippi for the meridian. Two survey teams started on the same day and proceed north (led by Prospect K. Robbins) and west (led by Joseph C. Brown), respectively.

The initial point was located as the place where these surveyed lines intersected (this is one of many examples where the meridian line and base line determined the initial point, rather than the other way around). As a result the initial point is in the middle of a high water swamp, on land that belonged to the Davidsons of Marvell, Arkansas. The family made this portion of their farm available to the state, and today the site, Louisiana Purchase State Park, consists of a 900-foot (270 m) boardwalk leading from a parking lot into the swamp. At the terminus of the boardwalk there is a granite monument which reads, "This stone marks the base established Nov. 10, 1815 from which the lands of the Louisiana Purchase were surveyed by United States Engineers, the first survey from this point was made to satisfy the claims of the soldiers of the War of 1812, with land bounties. Erected by the Arkansas Daughters of the American Revolution. Sponsored by the L'Anguille Chapter."

== See also ==
- List of principal and guide meridians and base lines of the United States
