= Wolford, North Dakota =

- City
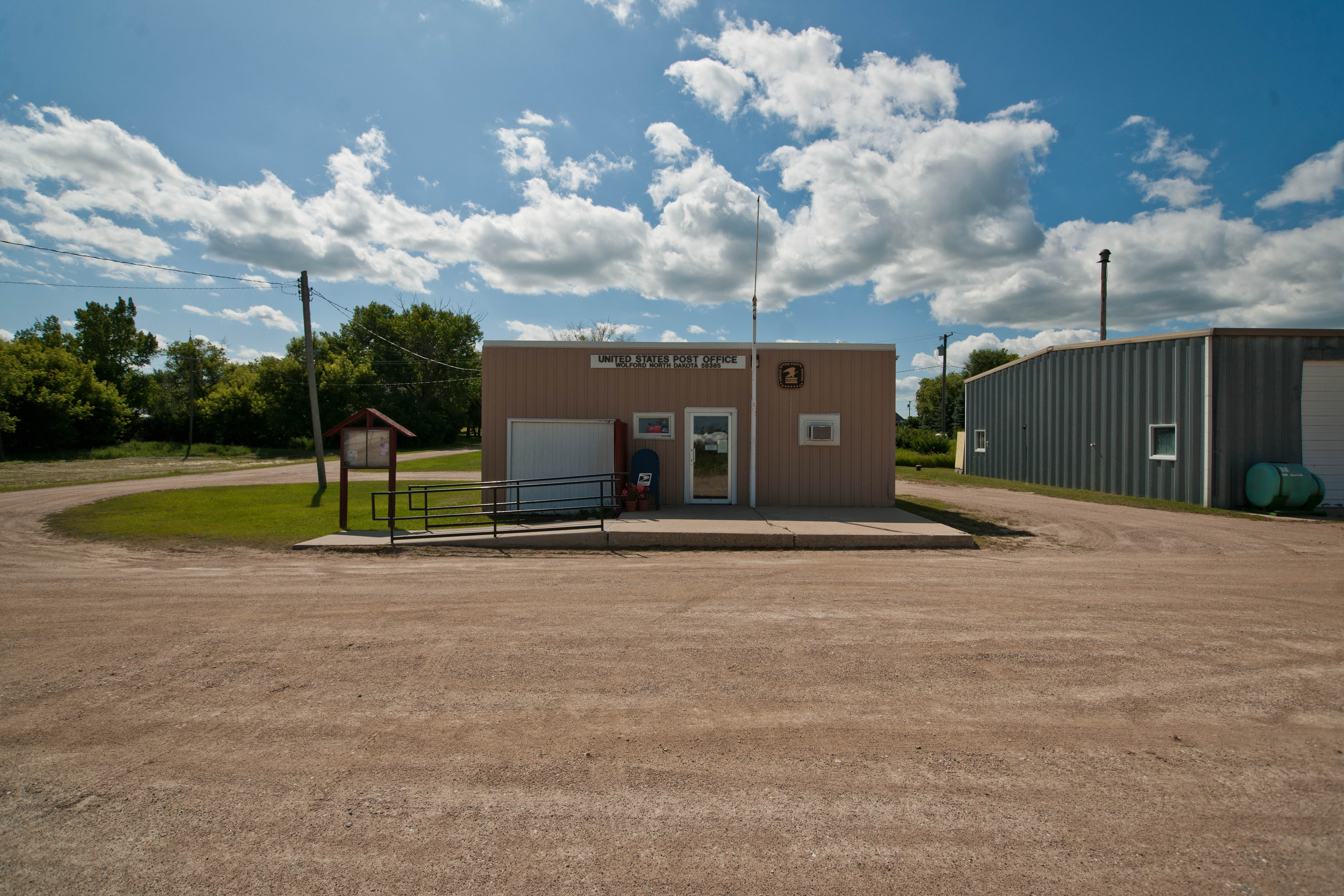
- Post office in Wolford

- Location of Wolford, North Dakota
- Coordinates: 48°29′51″N 99°42′14″W
- Country: United States
- State: North Dakota
- County: Pierce
- Founded: 1905

Area
  - Total: 0.18 sq mi (0.47 km^{2})
  - Land: 0.18 sq mi (0.47 km^{2})
  - Water: 0 sq mi (0.00 km^{2})
- Elevation: 1,618 ft (493 m)

Population (2020)
  - Total: 43
  - Density: 239.0/sq mi (92.29/km^{2})
- Time zone: UTC-6 (CST)
  - Summer (DST): UTC-5 (CDT)
- ZIP code: 58385
- Area code: 701
- FIPS code: 38-87180
- GNIS feature ID: 1036341

Wolford is a city located in the northeastern salient of Pierce County, North Dakota, United States. The population was 43 at the 2020 census. Wolford was founded in 1905.

== Geography ==
According to the United States Census Bureau, the city has a total area of 0.16 square miles (0.41 km^{2}), all land.

== Demographics ==
Historical population
Census	Pop.	Note	%±
1940	206		—
1950	140		−32.0%
1960	136		−2.9%
1970	81		−40.4%
1980	76		−6.2%
1990	56		−26.3%
2000	50		−10.7%
2010	36		−28.0%
2020	43		19.4%
2021 (est.)	40		−7.0%
U.S. Decennial Census; 2020 Census

=== 2010 census ===
As of the census of 2010, there were 36 people, 17 households, and 10 families residing in the city. The population density was 225.0 inhabitants per square mile (86.9/km^{2}). There were 27 housing units at an average density of 168.8 per square mile (65.2/km^{2}). The racial makeup of the city was 100.0% White.

There were 17 households, of which 23.5% had children under the age of 18 living with them, 58.8% were married couples living together, and 41.2% were non-families. 41.2% of all households were made up of individuals, and 17.7% had someone living alone who was 65 years of age or older. The average household size was 2.12 and the average family size was 2.90.

The median age in the city was 51.5 years. 25% of residents were under the age of 18; 0.0% were between the ages of 18 and 24; 19.4% were from 25 to 44; 36.2% were from 45 to 64; and 19.4% were 65 years of age or older. The gender makeup of the city was 47.2% male and 52.8% female.

=== 2000 census ===
As of the census of 2000, there were 50 people, 21 households, and 14 families residing in the city. The population density was 312.8 inhabitants per square mile (120.8/km^{2}). There were 30 housing units at an average density of 187.7 per square mile (72.5/km^{2}). The racial makeup of the city was 100.00% White.

There were 21 households, out of which 28.6% had children under the age of 18 living with them, 61.9% were married couples living together, 4.8% had a female householder with no husband present, and 33.3% were non-families. 33.3% of all households were made up of individuals, and 4.8% had someone living alone who was 65 years of age or older. The average household size was 2.38 and the average family size was 3.07.

In the city, the population was spread out, with 26.0% under the age of 18, 2.0% from 18 to 24, 32.0% from 25 to 44, 30.0% from 45 to 64, and 10.0% who were 65 years of age or older. The median age was 38 years. For every 10 females there were 10.8 males. For every 10 females age 18 and over, there were 11.7 males.

The median income for a household in the city was $37,500, and the median income for a family was $38,750. Males had a median income of $21,250 versus $13,750 for females. The per capita income for the city was $18,662. None of the population and none of the families were below the poverty line.

== Education ==
The school district is Wolford School District. Its only school, Wolford Public School, closed in 2019.

Upon the closing of the school, the district was then absorbed by the surrounding school districts of Rugby, North Star (Cando), Leeds and Rolette.
