= Wolford Elementary School =

Wolford Elementary School may refer to:

- Earl and Lottie Wolford Elementary School - McKinney, Texas - McKinney Independent School District
- Edith Wolford Elementary School - Colorado Springs, Colorado - Academy School District 20
- Wolford Public School - Wolford, North Dakota - Wolford School District
