= Doc West =

American jazz drummer (1915–1951)

- Born: Harold West; August 12, 1915; Wolford, North Dakota, U.S.
- Died: May 4, 1951 (aged 35) Cleveland, Ohio, U.S.
- Genres: Jazz
- Occupation: Musician
- Instrument: Drums
- Years active: 1930s–1951

Harold "Doc" West (August 12, 1915 – May 4, 1951) was an American jazz drummer.

== Early life ==
West was born in Wolford, North Dakota. He learned to play piano and cello as a child before switching to drums.

== Career ==
In the 1930s, West played in Chicago with Tiny Parham, Erskine Tate, and Roy Eldridge (1937/38). Late in the decade, he filled in for Chick Webb when Webb was unable to lead his own orchestra. In the early 1940s, he performed with Hot Lips Page and played on the early bebop scene at Minton's Playhouse in New York City with Dizzy Gillespie, Charlie Parker, Tiny Grimes, and Don Byas. He played with Oscar Pettiford in 1944 and stood in for Jo Jones occasionally in Count Basie's orchestra.

West appears on recordings from Slam Stewart, Leo Watson, Wardell Gray, Billie Holiday, Erroll Garner, Big Joe Turner, and Jay McShann.

== Personal life ==
West and his wife, Florence, had one daughter. He died in 1951 while on tour with Roy Eldridge.
