= York, North Dakota =

- City
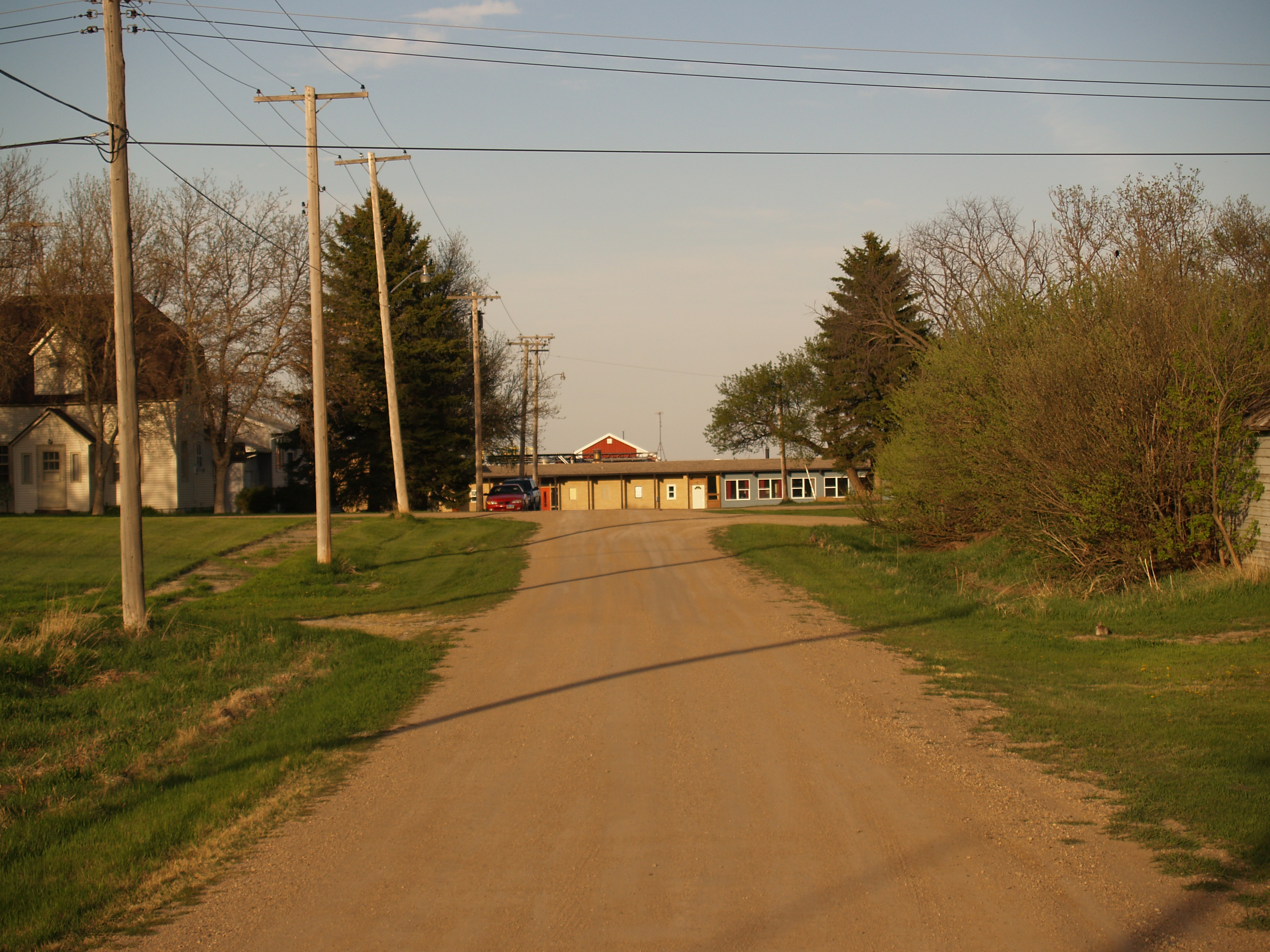
- Street in York
- Interactive map of York, North Dakota
- Location within North Dakota
- Coordinates: 48.3132°N 99.5733°W
- Country: United States
- State: North Dakota
- County: Benson
- Founded: 1886

Area
  - Total: 0.209 sq mi (0.541 km^{2})
  - Land: 0.209 sq mi (0.541 km^{2})
  - Water: 0 sq mi (0.000 km^{2}) 0.00%
- Elevation: 1,611 ft (491 m)

Population (2020)
  - Total: 17
  - Estimate (2025): 14
  - Density: 81/sq mi (31/km^{2})
- Time zone: UTC–6 (Central (CST))
  - Summer (DST): UTC–5 (CDT)
- ZIP Code: 58386
- Area code: 701
- FIPS code: 38-87860
- GNIS feature ID: 1036344

York is a city in Benson County, North Dakota, United States. The population was 17 as of the 2020 census, and was estimated at 14 in 2025.

== History ==
York was founded in 1886 and named after York, England by Great Northern Railway President James J. Hill. It was one of several sites along the Great Northern's transcontinental route between Devils Lake and Minot that were named after places in England (the others were Berwick, Leeds, Norwich, Penn, Rugby, Surrey, and Tunbridge).

== Geography ==
According to the United States Census Bureau, the city has a total area of 0.209 square miles (0.54 km^{2}), all land.

== Demographics ==
Historical population
| Census | Pop. | Note | %± |
|---|---|---|---|
| 1960 | 148 | | — |
| 1970 | 102 | | −31.1% |
| 1980 | 69 | | −32.4% |
| 1990 | 35 | | −49.3% |
| 2000 | 26 | | −25.7% |
| 2010 | 23 | | −11.5% |
| 2020 | 17 | | −26.1% |
| 2025 (est.) | 14 | | −17.6% |
U.S. Decennial Census; 2020 Census

=== 2020 census ===
As of the 2020 census, there were 17 people, 6 households, and 2 families residing in the city.

=== 2010 census ===
As of the 2010 census, there were 23 people, 11 households, and 7 families living in the city. The population density was 100.0 inhabitants per square mile (38.6/km^{2}). There were 23 housing units at an average density of 100.0 per square mile (38.6/km^{2}). The racial makeup of the city was 87.0% White and 13.0% from two or more races.

There were 11 households, of which 18.2% had children under the age of 18 living with them, 45.5% were married couples living together, 18.2% had a male householder with no wife present, and 36.4% were non-families. 36.4% of all households were made up of individuals, and 18.2% had someone living alone who was 65 years of age or older. The average household size was 2.09 and the average family size was 2.71.

The median age in the city was 52.5 years. 17.4% of residents were under the age of 18; 0.0% were between the ages of 18 and 24; 26% were from 25 to 44; 17.3% were from 45 to 64; and 39.1% were 65 years of age or older. The gender makeup of the city was 47.8% male and 52.2% female.

=== 2000 census ===
As of the 2000 census, there were 26 people, 11 households, and 7 families living in the city. The population density was 114.1 inhabitants per square mile (44.1/km^{2}). There were 32 housing units at an average density of 140.4 per square mile (54.2/km^{2}). The racial makeup of the city was 96.15% White, and 3.85% from two or more races.

There were 11 households, out of which 27.3% had children under the age of 18 living with them, 72.7% were married couples living together, and 27.3% were non-families. 27.3% of all households were made up of individuals, and 9.1% had someone living alone who was 65 years of age or older. The average household size was 2.36 and the average family size was 2.75.

In the city, the population was spread out, with 26.9% under the age of 18, 19.2% from 25 to 44, 30.8% from 45 to 64, and 23.1% who were 65 years of age or older. The median age was 48 years. For every 100 females, there were 100.0 males. For every 100 females age 18 and over, there were 111.1 males.

The median income for a household in the city was $47,917, and the median income for a family was $49,583. Males had a median income of $23,125 versus $0 for females. The per capita income for the city was $22,529. None of the population and none of the families were below the poverty line.

== Transportation ==
Amtrak’s Empire Builder, which operates between Seattle/Portland and Chicago, passes through the town on BNSF tracks, but makes no stop. The nearest station is located in Rugby, 22 miles (35 km) to the west.

== Education ==
The area is served by the Leeds School District. It operates the York School. In the 2025-26 academic year, the district reported a total of 142 students.
