= Reed Duchscher =

American talent manager and businessperson (born 1989)

- Born: July 13, 1989 (age 37); Rugby, North Dakota, U.S.
- Education: North Dakota State (BS); Fairleigh Dickinson University (MS)
- Occupation: Talent manager
- Years active: 2015–present
- Employer: Night Inc.
- Known for: Previous manager of MrBeast
- Board member of: Feastables (2021–present)

Reed Duchscher (born July 13, 1989) is an American talent manager and investor. He is the CEO and founder of Night Media, and talent manager of content creators such as political livestreamer Hasan Piker, streamer Kai Cenat and the Kalogeras Sisters, and former manager of YouTuber MrBeast from 2018–2024.

== Early life ==
Duchscher born and grew up in Rugby, North Dakota, and attended Rugby High School, where he participated in track and field, basketball, and football. After graduating from high school, he walked-on to play football at North Dakota State University.

== Career ==
Duchscher started his career working as an NFL sports agent. He subsequently left to work for the YouTube channel Dude Perfect on brand deals and monetization strategies.

On August 24, 2023 it was announced Duchscher would acquire LFM Management, adding Kai Cenat to his creator portfolio.

=== Night Media ===
While working with Dude Perfect, in 2015 Duchscher started his own talent management company, Night Media. Night Media focuses on management, branding and business development for digital influencers. In 2018, Duchscher signed YouTube personality MrBeast to Night Media's roster. In 2021, Night Media launched a consumer venture fund focused on investing in start-ups, internet culture, community and creators. The venture studio includes Feastables. In November of 2024, Night acquired talent management firm Bottle Rocket Management.

In May 2024, MrBeast exited his management by Duchscher and Night Media, stating their 6 year partnership was ending on good terms.

=== Feastables ===
In January 2022, Donaldson and Duchscher (Night Media) announced the creation of a new snack company called Feastables.

=== TONE ===
Duchscher and the content creators AMP (Any Means Possible) — Duke Dennis, Kai Cenat, Fanum, Agent 00, ChrisNxtDoor and ImDavisss created TONE, a personal care brand that launched online, in Target stores and on Target.com. The line includes deodorant, hydrating body wash, on-the-go cologne and body mist, Lip balm and body lotion.

=== The Roost Podcast Network ===
In April of 2024, Night acquired The Roost Podcasting Network which is a video-first podcast network.

== Media ==
- Duchscher spoke at TEDx NCState in 2020 about digital philanthropy.
- He was named to Business Insider's list of "top talent managers of YouTube" in 2020, 2021 and 2022.
- Duchscher was included in Dallas Magazine's "500 Most Influential People in 2020".
- In 2022, he was named to Business Insider's list of "22 top talent managers and agents working with YouTubers in building the future of the creator economy".
- Names to Fast Company's "The 5 Most Powerful Creator Economy Executives of 2022".
- Named to The Hollywood Reporter's "35 Rising Executives 35 and Under".
