= Surrey, North Dakota =

- City
- Logo

- Location of Surrey, North Dakota
- Coordinates: 48°14′36″N 101°07′59″W
- Country: United States
- State: North Dakota
- County: Ward
- Founded: June 18, 1900
- Incorporated: 1951

Government
  - Mayor: Michael Thiesen

Area
  - Total: 2.12 sq mi (5.49 km^{2})
  - Land: 2.11 sq mi (5.47 km^{2})
  - Water: 0.0077 sq mi (0.02 km^{2})
- Elevation: 1,614 ft (492 m)

Population (2020)
  - Total: 1,357
  - Estimate (2022): 1,393
  - Density: 642.4/sq mi (248.04/km^{2})
- Time zone: UTC-6 (Central (CST))
  - Summer (DST): UTC-5 (CDT)
- ZIP code: 58785
- Area code: 701
- FIPS code: 38-77180
- GNIS feature ID: 1036290
- Website: surreynd.org

Surrey is a city in Ward County, North Dakota, United States. The population was 1,357 at the 2020 census. Official incorporation of Surrey occurred in 1951. The city is part of the Minot Metropolitan Statistical Area.

== History ==
Surrey was founded on June 18, 1900, and named after Surrey, England, by Great Northern Railway officials. It was one of several sites along the Great Northern's transcontinental route between Devils Lake and Minot that were named after places in England (the others were Berwick, Leeds, Norwich, Penn, Rugby, Tunbridge, and York).

== Geography ==
According to the United States Census Bureau, the city has a total area of 0.99 square miles (2.56 km^{2}), of which 0.98 square miles (2.54 km^{2}) is land and 0.01 square miles (0.03 km^{2}) is water.

== Demographics ==
Historical population
Census	Pop.	Note	%±
1960	309		—
1970	361		16.8%
1980	999		176.7%
1990	856		−14.3%
2000	917		7.1%
2010	934		1.9%
2020	1,357		45.3%
2022 (est.)	1,393		2.7%
U.S. Decennial Census; 2020 Census

=== 2010 census ===
As of the census of 2010, there were 934 people, 334 households, and 264 families residing in the city. The population density was 953.1 inhabitants per square mile (368.0/km^{2}). There were 335 housing units at an average density of 341.8 per square mile (132.0/km^{2}). The racial makeup of the city was 95.3% White, 0.6% African American, 1.3% Native American, 0.3% Asian, 0.2% Pacific Islander, 0.2% from other races, and 2.0% from two or more races. Hispanic or Latino of any race were 1.4% of the population.

There were 334 households, of which 39.2% had children under the age of 18 living with them, 65.6% were married couples living together, 7.8% had a female householder with no husband present, 5.7% had a male householder with no wife present, and 21.0% were non-families. 16.2% of all households were made up of individuals, and 3.3% had someone living alone who was 65 years of age or older. The average household size was 2.80 and the average family size was 3.09.

The median age in the city was 32.5 years. 28.2% of residents were under the age of 18; 8.2% were between the ages of 18 and 24; 29.9% were from 25 to 44; 25.8% were from 45 to 64; and 7.8% were 65 years of age or older. The gender makeup of the city was 51.2% male and 48.8% female.

=== 2000 census ===
As of the census of 2000, there were 917 people, 307 households, and 260 families residing in the city. The population density was 943.1 inhabitants per square mile (364.1/km^{2}). There were 313 housing units at an average density of 321.9 per square mile (124.3/km^{2}). The racial makeup of the city was 97.27% White, 1.85% Native American, 0.33% Asian, and 0.55% from two or more races. Hispanic or Latino of any race were 0.87% of the population.

There were 307 households, out of which 53.4% had children under the age of 18 living with them, 66.4% were married couples living together, 13.0% had a female householder with no husband present, and 15.0% were non-families. 12.4% of all households were made up of individuals, and 2.6% had someone living alone who was 65 years of age or older. The average household size was 2.99 and the average family size was 3.24.

In the city, the population was spread out, with 34.5% under the age of 18, 6.8% from 18 to 24, 34.5% from 25 to 44, 19.3% from 45 to 64, and 5.0% who were 65 years of age or older. The median age was 32 years. For every 100 females, there were 102.4 males. For every 100 females age 18 and over, there were 99.7 males.

The median income for a household in the city was $43,403, and the median income for a family was $46,250. Males had a median income of $29,688 versus $19,375 for females. The per capita income for the city was $14,679. About 5.5% of families and 5.9% of the population were below the poverty line, including 8.6% of those under age 18 and 11.8% of those age 65 or over.

== Transportation ==
Amtrak’s Empire Builder, which operates between Seattle/Portland and Chicago, passes through the city on BNSF tracks, but makes no stop. The nearest station is located in Minot, 8 miles (13 km) to the west.

== Climate ==
This climatic region is typified by large seasonal temperature differences, with warm to hot (and often humid) summers and cold (sometimes severely cold) winters. According to the Köppen Climate Classification system, Surrey has a humid continental climate, abbreviated "Dfb" on climate maps.
