= Wolford School District =

School district headquartered in Wolford, North Dakota, US

Wolford Public School District 1 was a school district headquartered in Wolford, North Dakota. It had one school, Wolford Public School that closed in 2019.

It included sections of Pierce and Rolette counties.

The school opened in 1914. Larry Zavada became superintendent circa 2003. In the period prior to 2020 the number of students ranged from 39 to 44 and nine full-time employees. Circa 2019 the district did cuts to school bus transportation to save $57,000. In May 2019 the administration decided to close the school forever due to budget issues and a lack of qualified employees. It had 46 students at the end of its life.

The school closed in 2019. Students in the district, if wishing to attend a traditional school, were allowed go to North Star Schools in Cando, Rolette Public School District No. 29 of Rolette, or Rugby Public Schools in Rugby. The district was to be divided between Leeds Public School District No. 6, North Star, Rolette, and Rugby. The district was formally disestablished in 2019.
