= Norwich, North Dakota =

- Unincorporated community
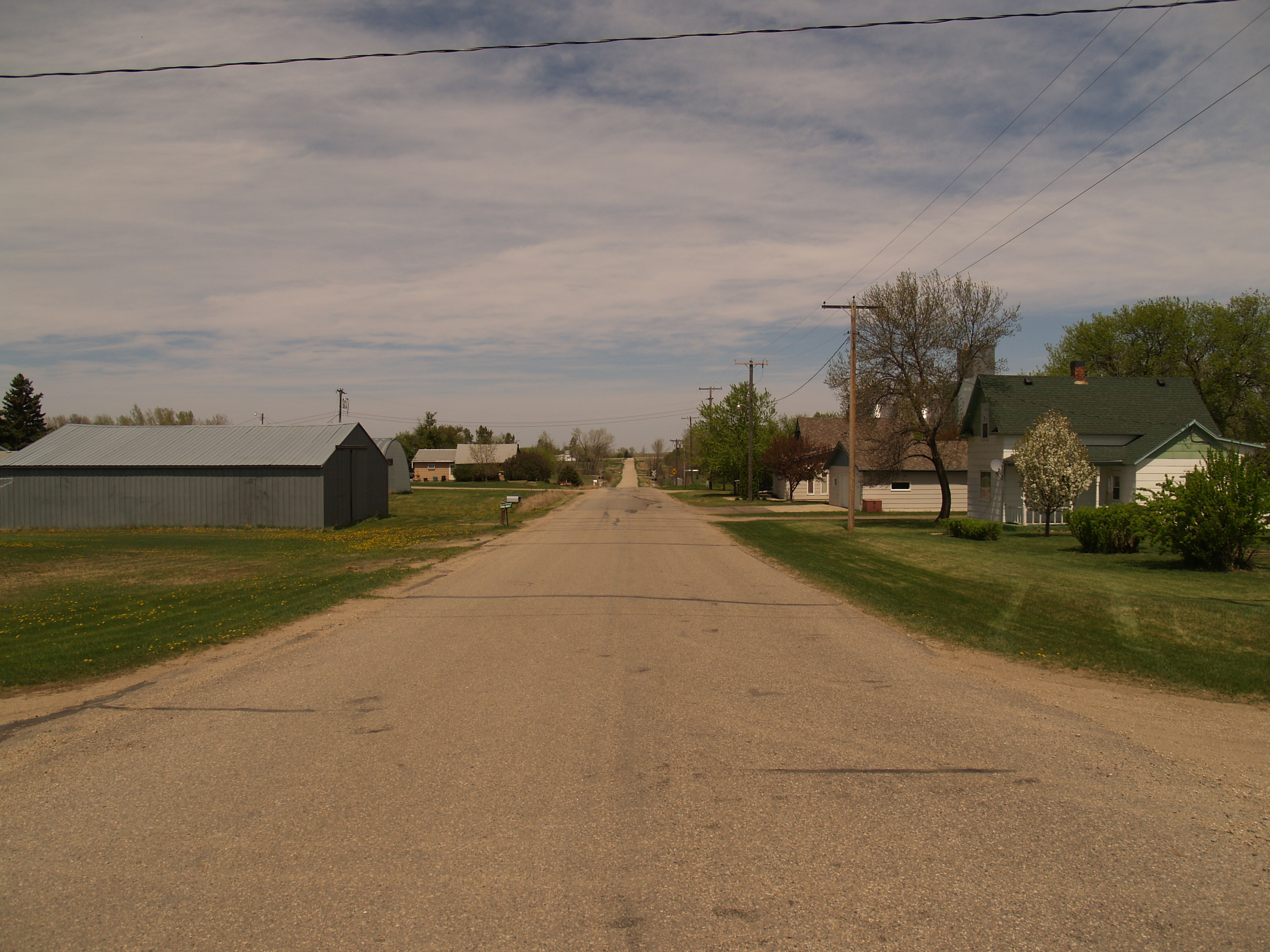
- Street in Norwich

- Location within North Dakota Location within the United States
- Coordinates: 48°14′47″N 100°59′21″W
- Country: United States
- State: North Dakota
- County: McHenry
- Elevation: 1,549 ft (472 m)
- Time zone: UTC-6 (Central (CST))
  - Summer (DST): UTC-5 (CDT)
- ZIP codes: 58768
- Area code: 701
- GNIS feature ID: 1030509

Norwich is an unincorporated community in western McHenry County, North Dakota, United States. It lies along U.S. Route 2 southwest of the city of Towner, the county seat of McHenry County. Norwich's elevation is 1,549 feet (472 m). It is unincorporated, and had a post office with the ZIP code of 58768. Though the post office closed May 4, 1996, the ZIP code is still valid for use.

Norwich was founded in 1901 and named after Norwich, England in an effort to please Great Northern Railway stockholders from England. It was one of several sites along the Great Northern's transcontinental route between Devils Lake and Minot that were named after places in England (the others were Berwick, Leeds, Penn, Rugby, Surrey, Tunbridge, and York).

The community is part of the Minot Micropolitan Statistical Area.

== Transportation ==
Amtrak’s Empire Builder, which operates between Seattle/Portland and Chicago, passes through the town on BNSF tracks, but makes no stop. The nearest station is located in Minot, 15 miles (24 km) to the west.
