= Mylo, North Dakota =

- City
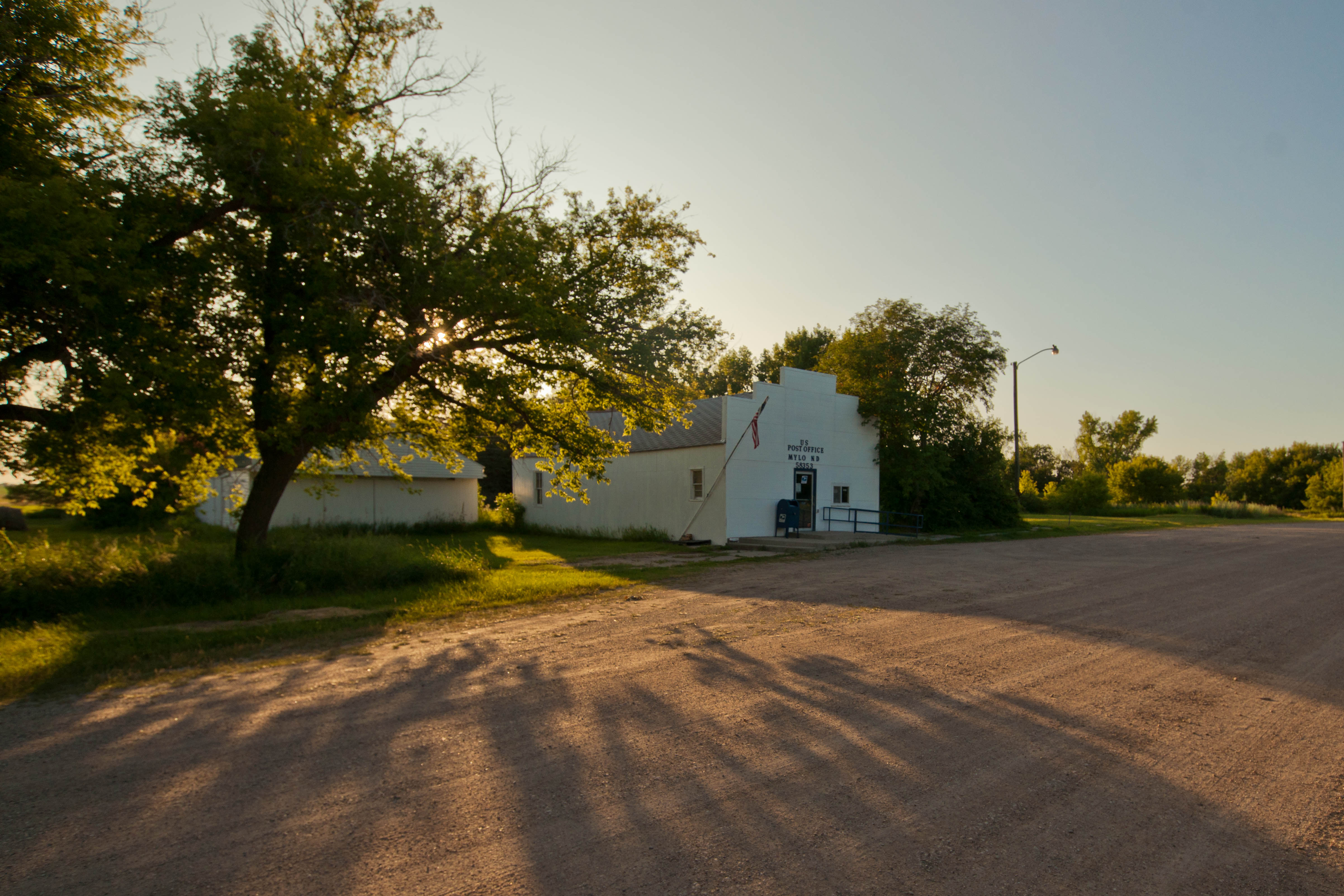
- Post office in Mylo

- Location of Mylo, North Dakota
- Coordinates: 48°38′09″N 99°37′05″W
- Country: United States
- State: North Dakota
- County: Rolette
- Founded: 1905

Area
  - Total: 0.86 sq mi (2.23 km^{2})
  - Land: 0.86 sq mi (2.23 km^{2})
  - Water: 0 sq mi (0.00 km^{2})
- Elevation: 1,654 ft (504 m)

Population (2020)
  - Total: 21
  - Estimate (2023): 18
  - Density: 24.4/sq mi (9.41/km^{2})
- Time zone: UTC–6 (Central (CST))
  - Summer (DST): UTC–5 (CDT)
- ZIP Code: 58353
- Area code: 701
- FIPS code: 38-55220
- GNIS feature ID: 1036174

Mylo is a city in Rolette County, North Dakota, United States. The population was 21 at the 2020 census.

== History ==
In June 1905, lots were sold for what is now the Village of Mylo. In November 1905, the Minneapolis, St. Paul and Sault Ste. Marie railroad, simply known as the "Soo" or "Soo Line", for the phonetic spelling of "Sault" in Sault Ste. Marie, came through Mylo. On November 18, 1905, crews working from the east and those working from the west met about one mile west of Mylo to complete this agricultural branch of the Soo Line. A Post Office was established in Mylo in 1905 and was in operation until its closing in 2011. The Mylo Post Office also provided the rural route service for the Towner County city of Perth, N.D. in the later years. Mylo was incorporated as a village in 1907. Some notable items from the Mylo City Council Meetings are as follows:

On April 8, 1908, with all members voting yes, that sidewalks be constructed of planks at least 1 3/4 inch in thickness, or shall be of cement construction, and shall be eight feet in width, and properly supported, and be constructed at such grades as shall be approved by the street commissioner. On September 7, 1910, the clerk was authorized to order five Oliver street lamps for the village. Ole Peterson got paid 10 dollars for lighting the street lamps for the years 1910 and 1911. On January 3, 1912, Wm. Hazlett was paid one dollar for board of prisoners. On October 10, 1918, a special meeting was called to prohibit the holding of any public meetings until further notice to prevent the spread of influenza. On April 12, 1921, motion was made and carried to have hitching posts put up to tie horses to. On September 23, 1927, a special meeting was held to canvas the votes of a special election on whether or not to construct an electrical distribution system to be used in connection with the hi-line of the Otter Tail Power Co. This would give Otter Tail Power Co. permission to install and operate an electric light, power system and transmission line in the village for the purpose of furnishing electric lights, heat and power to the village and its inhabitants. There were 45 votes cast with all in favor of the construction. On January 15, 1937, the village board met and felt that as a result of the legalizing the sale of intoxicating liquor in the State of North Dakota and the adoption of the liquor control ordinance permitting the sale of intoxicating liquor in the village of Mylo, that additional police protection will be needed and to appoint a special officer to maintain order in the village. In 1954, Mylo signed an agreement with Northwest Bell Telephone Co. so they could put up poles and string wire so the residents could have telephones. Some of the businesses had phones prior to this.

It is not known for certain how Mylo got its name. It is said that it was possibly named after Melvin Small, who owned the land where Mylo was built, or it is named after Father Malo, the first Rolette County priest, or possibly named after the Soo Line agent who was involved in the location of the town site.

At its peak in 1920, Mylo had a peak population of 140. In the 2010 Census, the population of Mylo was shown to be 20, with no businesses in operation. The school in Mylo closed in the spring of 1973 and the last business in Mylo closed its doors in 1986.

== Geography ==
According to the United States Census Bureau, the city has a total area of 0.86 square miles (2.23 km^{2}), all land.

== Demographics ==
Historical population
Census	Pop.	Note	%±
1910	98		—
1920	140		42.9%
1930	134		−4.3%
1940	89		−33.6%
1950	110		23.6%
1960	103		−6.4%
1970	51		−50.5%
1980	31		−39.2%
1990	20		−35.5%
2000	19		−5.0%
2010	20		5.3%
2020	21		5.0%
2023 (est.)	18		−14.3%
U.S. Decennial Census; 2020 Census

=== 2010 census ===
As of the 2010 census, there were 20 people in 9 households, including 4 families, in the city. The population density was 22.0 inhabitants per square mile (8.5/km^{2}). There were 12 housing units at an average density of 13.2 per square mile (5.1/km^{2}). The racial makup of the city was 95.0% White and 5.0% Native American.

Of the 9 households 22.2% had children under the age of 18 living with them, 44.4% were married couples living together, and 55.6% were non-families. 44.4% of households were one person and 22.2% were one person aged 65 or older. The average household size was 2.22 and the average family size was 3.50.

The median age was 45.5 years. 30% of residents were under the age of 18; 0.0% were between the ages of 18 and 24; 20% were from 25 to 44; 40% were from 45 to 64; and 10% were 65 or older. The gender makeup of the city was 50.0% male and 50.0% female.

=== 2000 census ===
As of the 2000 census, there were 19 people in 10 households, including 7 families, in the city. The population density was 21.0 people per square mile (8.2/km^{2}). There were 14 housing units at an average density of 15.5 per square mile (6.0/km^{2}). The racial makup of the city was 100% White.

Of the 10 households 10.0% had children under the age of 18 living with them, 70.0% were married couples living together, none had a female householder with no husband present, and 30.0% were non-families. 30.0% of households were one person and 30.0% were one person aged 65 or older. The average household size was 1.90 and the average family size was 2.29.

The age distribution was 10.5% under the age of 18, 5.3% from 18 to 24, 15.8% from 25 to 44, 31.6% from 45 to 64, and 36.8% 65 or older. The median age was 60 years. For every 100 females, there were 137.5 males. For every 100 females age 18 and over, there were 112.5 males.

The median household income was $28,750 and the median family income was $45,000. Males had a median income of $31,250 versus $28,750 for females. The per capita income for the city was $23,279. None of the families and 8.3% of the population were below the poverty line, including none of those under the age of 18 and 100.0% of those 65 and older.

== Education ==
A school was built in Mylo in 1910 and operated until 1973. This school was for kindergarten through the eighth grade. Mylo never had a high school. After eighth grade, students would generally attend high school in Bisbee or Rolette, North Dakota. After the school closed in the spring of 1973, Mylo became part of the Rolette School District.

Mylo students attend the nearby Rolette Public School.
