= Samuel Kirk (psychologist) =

American psychologist and educator (1904–1996)

S. A. Kirk
- Born: Samuel Alexander Kirk; September 1, 1904; Rugby, North Dakota, United States
- Died: July 21, 1996 (aged 91)
- Education: University of Michigan
- Occupations: Psychologist and educator
- Known for: Coining the term learning disability

Samuel Alexander Kirk (1904–1996) was an American psychologist and educator, who is best known for coining the term learning disability.

== Early life ==
Kirk was born in Rugby, North Dakota on 1 September 1904, to the farmers Richard and Nellie Kirk. He grew up in a farm town and taught farmhands how to read at night. Kirk served in the military where he created a program for recruits who struggled with reading and writing.

Kirk received both his bachelor's and master's degree in psychology from the University of Chicago. He then obtained his PhD in physiological and clinical psychology from the University of Michigan.

He married Winifred D. Kirk and had one son, Jerry Kirk, and one daughter, anthropologist Lorraine Kirk.

== Career ==
Samuel Kirk is recognized for his accomplishments in the field of special education, while sometimes being referred to as the “Father of Special Education”.

He began his teaching career at the Oaks School in Chicago in 1929, where he worked specifically with boys who were delinquent and had mental disabilities. His interest in the field of special education continued as he worked closely with individuals with learning disabilities. Samuel Kirk “wrote so widely and so authoritatively on so many aspects of mental retardation and learning disorders and was responsible for so many innovations in diagnosis, training, and social policy”.

In 1963, Kirk delivered a speech to an education conference and was the first to use and define the term “learning disability”. This speech had a monumental effect on social policies and also helped name Kirk to the federal post by John F. Kennedy who had a sister who had a mental disability (now more commonly called an intellectual disability). Kirk laid the groundwork for passing laws, which required schools to provide help for children with learning disabilities. In public policy (1964), Kirk persuaded Washington to provide money in order to train teachers to help students with learning disabilities. Kirk's commitment to students with learning disabilities led to the first ever Institute for Research on Exceptional Children more than 50 years ago, which is still a popular foundation in the special education department.

Within Kirk's publications regarding learning disabilities, he describes classifications used for children with learning disabilities. This includes a unified classification of children with low intelligence, while they are differentiated based on a degree of learning deficit, for educational purposes. He also listed the causes he discovered to be associated with learning disabilities. These are as follows: brain injuries, physiological disturbances, hereditary factors, and cultural factors. Within his publication titled Educating the Retarded Child, he describes the identification for a child with a learning disability to include a study of the child across disciplines, or as a whole, intelligence tests, achievement tests, and personality and social maturity tests.

== Publications ==
Title	Year	Description
Teaching Reading to Slow-Learning Children	1940	Presents teachers and administrators with problems and solutions for teaching children who are slow-learners in the area of reading.
Educating the Retarded Child	1951	Aims to discuss new education laws related to educating retarded children and appropriate procedures to show the value of the individual to society.
You and Your Retarded Child	1958	Guides parents on how to educate and communicate with their child with special education needs.
Early Education of the Mentally Retarded	1958	Discusses research and theory of early intervention for children with learning disabilities through a variety of case studies.
Educating Exceptional Children	1962	Discusses each of the thirteen disability categories and research-based teaching methods and strategies for children with each of these disabilities. It further discusses the needs of children who are gifted and talented.
Psycholinguistic Learning Disabilities: Diagnosis and Remediation	1971	Aims to help readers interpret test results for students with psycholinguistic learning disabilities.
Phonic Remedial Reading Lessons	1985	Provides a programmed method of teaching reading to children who are struggling readers.
