= KZZJ =

- Rugby, North Dakota; United States
- Frequency: 1450 kHz
- Branding: KZZJ AM 1450 and FM 92.1

Programming
- Format: Country
- Affiliations: ABC News Radio

Ownership
- Owner: Rugby Broadcasters, Inc.
- Sister stations: KKWZ

History
- First air date: 1959 (as KGCA)
- Former call signs: KGCA (1959–1985)

Technical information
- Licensing authority: FCC
- Facility ID: 57928
- Class: C
- Power: 1,000 watts (unlimited)
- Transmitter coordinates: 48°21′14″N 99°59′31″W
- Translator: 92.1 K221GN (Rugby)

Links
- Public license information: Public file; LMS
- Webcast: Listen Live
- Website: rugbybroadcasters.com

KZZJ (1450 AM) is a radio station licensed to serve Rugby, North Dakota. The station is owned by Rugby Broadcasters, Inc. Its studios and transmitter are at 230 Hwy 2 SE in Rugby.

It airs a country music format. The station carries local and regional coverage of farm and agriculture news, carrying dedicated reports from the American Ag Network. KZZJ is affiliated with ABC News Radio for national news coverage and the Dakota News Network for regional news reports. In 2018, the station began broadcasting an encore of the nationally syndicated nostalgia show "Sunday at the Memories"

== History ==
The station currently known as KZZJ first signed on the air in 1959 under the call sign KGCA, operating with a power of 250 watts.. The station was founded by a group of three men: Ray Friedrich, Olaf Falkvold, and Oscar Halvorson. The station's call letters were changed to KZZJ in 1985. The station is owned by Programmer's Broadcasting, which operates as the Hometown Radio Group. This group is the only locally owned and operated commercial media company in the Minot and Devils Lake areas. KZZJ's sister stations in the Devils Lake area include KDWZ and KDVL. The station was assigned the KZZJ call letters by the Federal Communications Commission on February 11, 1985.

Logo before translator sign on

== New sister station ==
KZZJ added another station. KKWZ-FM (95.3), originally licensed to Crary, ND. After the sale, it moved its transmitter 65 miles west to Rugby. KKWZ now broadcasts with 6 kW from KZZJ's transmitter tower, license changed to Rugby.
