= Harald Bredesen =

American Lutheran pastor

- Born: August 18, 1918; Rugby, North Dakota, U.S.
- Died: December 29, 2006 (aged 88); Escondido, California, U.S.

Harald Bredesen (August 18, 1918 – December 29, 2006) was an American Lutheran pastor who was influential in the early days of the American charismatic movement.

== Background ==
Elmer Harald Bredesen was born in Rugby, North Dakota to Alfred Bredesen and Dagny (Knutson) Bredesen. His father was the pastor of the Lutheran Church. He attended Luther College in Decorah, Iowa and was ordained into the ministry during 1945.

== Biography ==
He had professional success immediately out of seminary, having worked for the World Council of Churches as the Public Relations Secretary for the World Council of Christian Education. However, Harald felt something missing in his life. In 1946, he went to a Pentecostal camp meeting where he received the baptism of the Holy Spirit.

He was ordained in 1944, and in 1946 he received what Pentecostals refer to as the baptism of the Holy Spirit, a religious experience accompanied by speaking in tongues. Many other charismatic Christians have credited him with leading them into the same experience, including Pat Boone and Pat Robertson. Bredesen became friends with evangelist Robertson while they both lived in New York in the late 1950s. Robertson called his ministry to world leaders "legendary."

In his introduction to Bredesen's book, Yes, Lord, entertainer Pat Boone wrote, "Abraham... Moses... Gideon... Elijah... I think I've known a man like these. His name is Harald Bredesen. Miracles trail him wherever he goes."

Bredesen was the founder of the Prince of Peace Prize, given to Egyptian President Anwar Sadat in 1980, Mother Teresa in 1989, posthumously to King Hussein of Jordan (with King Abdullah receiving in his father's stead) in 1999, and to Billy Graham in 2004. Sadat called the occasion he received the award "the high point of my entire life, more important to me even than the Nobel Peace Prize. That was in the political arena. This was spiritual."

A Lutheran minister, Bredesen became the first ordained clergyman from a mainline denomination to receive the Pentecostal experience of the Baptism in the Holy Spirit, openly tell of his experience, and keep his ordination and credentials in a mainline denomination. He did, however, abandon the ministerial practice of a backward collar in the early 70's in favor of a simple business suit. In a letter to the editor of Eternity Magazine, Harald Bredesen and Jean Stone Willans coined the term "Charismatic Renewal."

In the late-1950s, he introduced Pat Robertson to the experience. Robertson went on to found the Christian Broadcasting Network where Harald was a founding board member. In Pat Robertson: A Personal, Political, and Religious Portrait, historian David Harrell wrote, "In the long run it was a chance encounter with Harald Bredesen that had the most far-reaching effect on the life and career of Pat Robertson."

In his book Reagan Inside/Out, Bob Slosser called Bredesen "minister to world leaders." In that role he touched the lives of many of the most influential figures of his time. A call to prayer that Harald wrote and proposed to his friend Anwar Sadat was cabled by Sadat, Jimmy Carter and Menachem Begin to leaders around the world on the eve of the Camp David summit. According to pundits at the time, few summits began with so little going for them. Thirteen days later, President Jimmy Carter announced the breakthrough by saying, "We began this summit with a call to prayer. The results have exceeded the expectations of any reasonable person. I am a Christian. Jesus said, 'Blessed are the peacemakers.'"

He met and married Genevieve Corrick in 1954. In 1957, he was called to pastor the historic First Reformed Church of Mount Vernon, New York and soon invited Robertson to join him as assistant pastor. Together with others who had received the Baptism in the Holy Spirit, Harald and Pat hosted Pentecostal style meetings in the old church during off hours. In the late 60's and early 70's these meetings, known to start regularly at 4 p.m. called simply "Vespers" and held in the sanctuary, became the focus of what many felt was the only true 'body ministry' gathering anywhere on the east coast, and while Bredesen always moderated at these meetings, which often went two and three hours, he always preferred to encourage those gathered to understand and exercise their giftings in the meeting. A favorite song always concluded those late Sunday afternoon meetings, when characteristically, all those gathered would hold hands in a wide circle that encompassed frequently the entire sanctuary of the First Reformed Church. "I'm living on the mountain underneath a cloudless sky; I drinking from the fountain that never shall run dry; oh yes, I feasting on the manna from a bountiful supply; I'm living in Beaulah Land!"

It was during this time that Bredesen met and became close friends with George Otis, founder of Bible Voice, and early in 1970 relocated from his home in Mount Vernon to Otis' house in southern California, and prior to leaving he and a visiting brother who had also been markedly affected by Bredesen, Scott Ross, ordained three local brothers to continue what had become an independent but non-institutionalized house church. The spirit by which he had demonstrated his wholehearted dedication to a Spirit-led gathering of the saints was not only felt, but strongly maintained for years after his departure. David Gregory, one of those whose lives was dramatically changed by the whole Mount Vernon experience said that Bredesen's way of praying, walking around boldly praising God, often lapsing into tongues, had a permanent effect upon his whole understanding of prayer.

Bredesen was often called the father of the charismatic movement whose adherents now number in the hundreds of millions. Bredesen hosted the long-running Christian Broadcasting Network television program Charisma. He authored the books Yes, Lord and Need A Miracle?, the CD Toolkit for Eternity: A Walk with Harald Bredesen and the video How to Receive the Baptism in the Holy Spirit.

== Accident and death ==
On December 26, 2006, Bredesen fell down the stairs in his home, fracturing his skull and causing major bleeding in his brain. He died at Palomar Hospital from complications from the fall three days later on December 29. According to his assistant Tom Gilbreath, he died peacefully. He was survived by his wife, Genevieve; his children, Dagni, Margaret, Christopher, and David; and five grandchildren.
