= Leeds, North Dakota =

- City
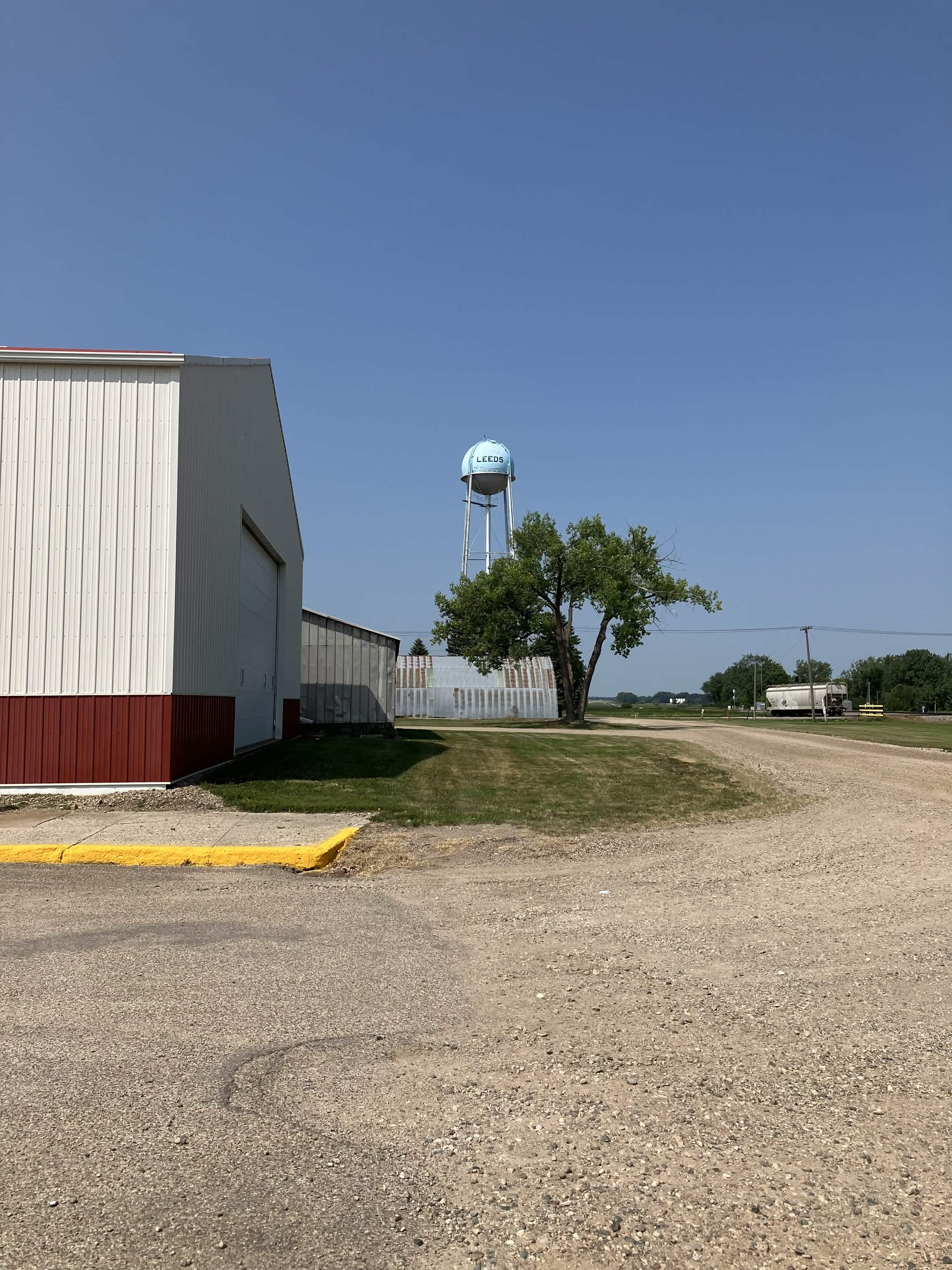

- Logo

- Location of Leeds, North Dakota

- Location in the United States
- Coordinates: 48°17′16″N 99°26′05″W
- Country: United States
- State: North Dakota
- County: Benson
- Founded: 1887

Area
  - Total: 0.67 sq mi (1.73 km^{2})
  - Land: 0.63 sq mi (1.64 km^{2})
  - Water: 0.035 sq mi (0.09 km^{2})
- Elevation: 1,516 ft (462 m)

Population (2020)
  - Total: 442
  - Estimate (2024): 424
  - Density: 698.7/sq mi (269.78/km^{2})
- Time zone: UTC–6 (Central (CST))
  - Summer (DST): UTC–5 (CDT)
- ZIP code: 58346
- Area code: 701
- FIPS code: 38-45580
- GNIS feature ID: 1036124
- Website: leedsnorthdakota.com

Leeds is a city in Benson County, North Dakota, United States. The population was 442 at the 2020 census.

Leeds was founded in 1887 and named after Leeds, England. It was one of several sites along the Great Northern Railway's transcontinental route between Devils Lake and Minot that were named after places in England (the others were Berwick, Norwich, Penn, Rugby, Surrey, Tunbridge, and York).

== Geography ==
According to the United States Census Bureau, the city has a total area of 0.45 square miles (1.17 km^{2}), all land. The nearby Lake Ibsen is located approximately 1.5 miles (2.4 km) south-east of the city center.

== Demographics ==
Historical population
Census	Pop.	Note	%±
1900	349		—
1910	682		95.4%
1920	704		3.2%
1930	725		3.0%
1940	782		7.9%
1950	778		−0.5%
1960	797		2.4%
1970	626		−21.5%
1980	678		8.3%
1990	542		−20.1%
2000	464		−14.4%
2010	427		−8.0%
2020	442		3.5%
2024 (est.)	424		−4.1%
U.S. Decennial Census; 2020 Census

=== 2010 census ===
As of the 2010 census, there were 427 people, 201 households, and 118 families living in the city. The population density was 948.9 inhabitants per square mile (366.4/km^{2}). There were 266 housing units at an average density of 591.1 per square mile (228.2/km^{2}). The racial makeup of the city was 97.4% White, 1.4% Native American, and 1.2% from two or more races. Hispanic or Latino of any race were 0.9% of the population.

There were 201 households, of which 23.9% had children under the age of 18 living with them, 52.7% were married couples living together, 5.0% had a female householder with no husband present, 1.0% had a male householder with no wife present, and 41.3% were non-families. 35.8% of all households were made up of individuals, and 23.9% had someone living alone who was 65 years of age or older. The average household size was 2.12 and the average family size was 2.78.

The median age in the city was 50.6 years. 20.8% of residents were under the age of 18; 4.7% were between the ages of 18 and 24; 16.8% were from 25 to 44; 30.4% were from 45 to 64; and 27.2% were 65 years of age or older. The gender makeup of the city was 50.4% male and 49.6% female.

=== 2000 census ===
As of the 2000 census, there were 464 people, 212 households, and 129 families living in the city. The population density was 1,018.8 inhabitants per square mile (393.4/km^{2}). There were 282 housing units at an average density of 619.2 per square mile (239.1/km^{2}). The racial makeup of the city was 96.98% White, 0.65% African American and 2.37% Native American.

There were 212 households, out of which 28.3% had children under the age of 18 living with them, 51.4% were married couples living together, 8.0% had a female householder with no husband present, and 38.7% were non-families. 37.3% of all households were made up of individuals, and 23.6% had someone living alone who was 65 years of age or older. The average household size was 2.19 and the average family size was 2.90.

In the city, the population was spread out, with 25.4% under the age of 18, 3.7% from 18 to 24, 22.6% from 25 to 44, 24.1% from 45 to 64, and 24.1% who were 65 years of age or older. The median age was 44 years. For every 100 females, there were 96.6 males. For every 100 females age 18 and over, there were 93.3 males.

The median income for a household in the city was $31,953, and the median income for a family was $49,444. Males had a median income of $30,500 versus $17,279 for females. The per capita income for the city was $19,869. About 6.7% of families and 13.5% of the population were below the poverty line, including 17.6% of those under age 18 and 15.3% of those age 65 or over.

== Transportation ==
Amtrak’s Empire Builder, which operates between Seattle/Portland and Chicago, passes through the town on BNSF tracks, but makes no stop. The nearest stations are located in Rugby, 28 miles (45 km) to the west, and Devils Lake, 30 miles (48 km) to the east.

== Education ==
It is in Leeds School District 6.

== Great War Monument ==
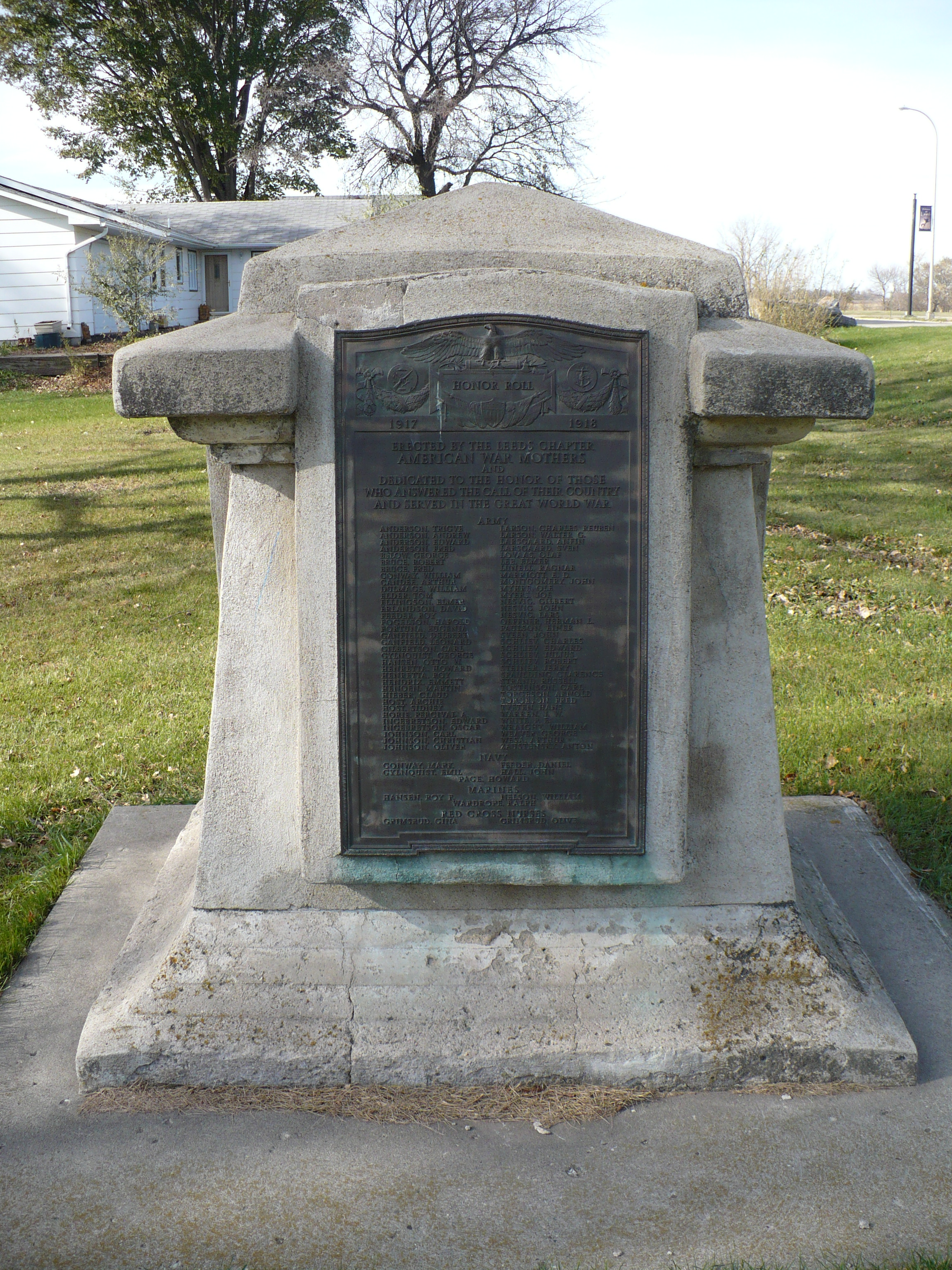
Leeds, ND Great War Monument

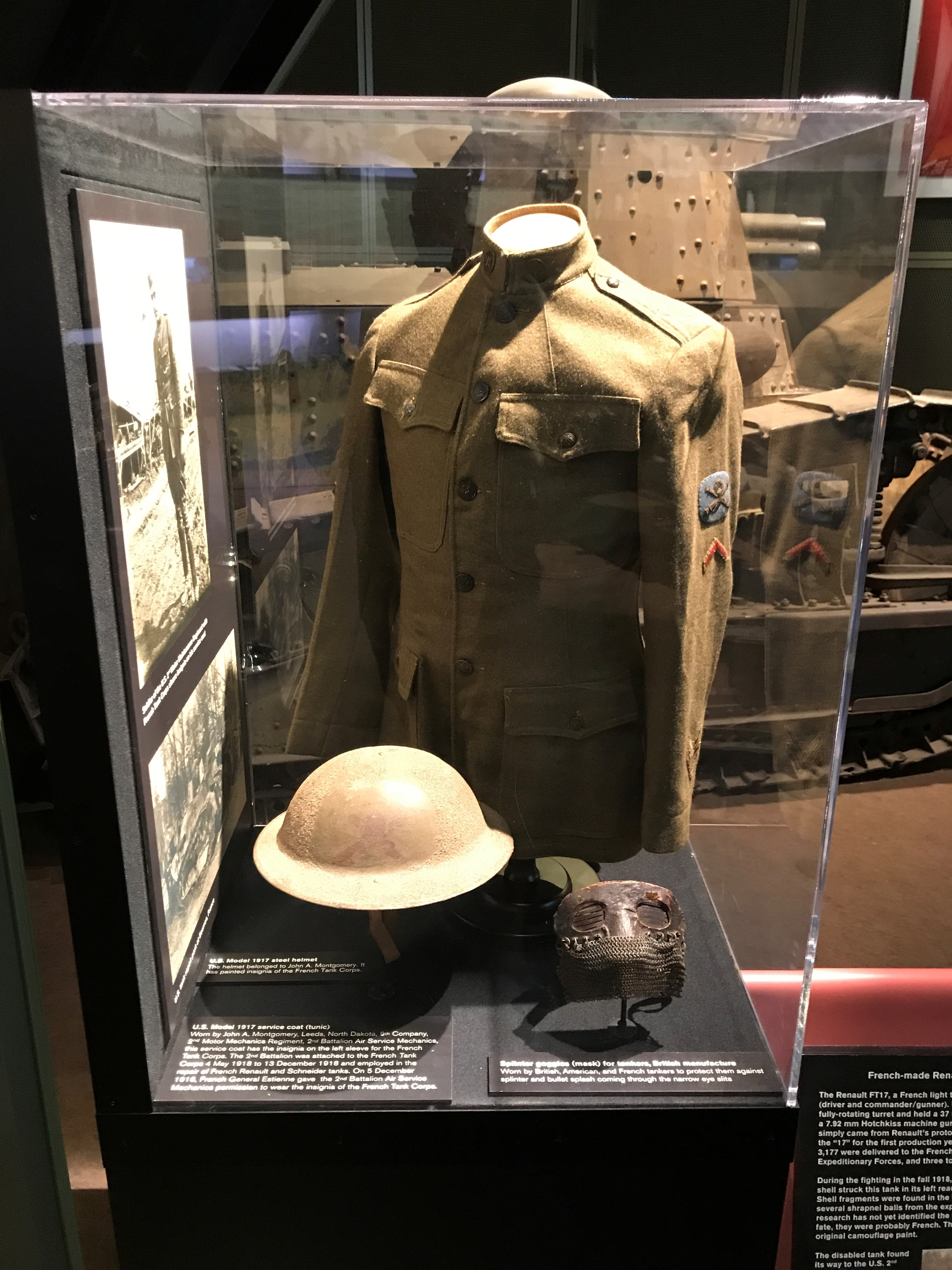
John A Montgomery Service Coat and Helmet

Leeds is home to a Great War (World War I) monument that was constructed by the American War Mothers. The six-foot-tall granite pedestal bears a bronze tablet that lists seventy-six men and two Red Cross nurses who participated in the conflict. The call to build the monument went out in the April 15, 1920 issue of the Leeds News. The November 18, 1920 issue of the Leeds News listed the names of the men and women who were to be placed on the monument to ensure that no names had been missed. The August 4, 1921 issue of the Leeds News announced that on August 7, 1921 the monument would be given its official dedication at 3 o'clock by the Great Northern right of way near the depot. It was written that "...this little spot has been seeded down and well cared for this summer and makes a pretty setting for the monument." The monument currently resides in Firemen's Memorial Park.

The steel helmet and service coat of Leeds service member John A. Montgomery is currently located at the National WW1 Museum and Memorial in Kansas City, Missouri. Montgomery was assigned to the "...9th Company, 2nd Motor Mechanics Regiment, 2nd Battalion Air Service Mechanics. The 2nd Battalion was attached to the French Tank Corps 4 May 1918 to 13 December 1918 and employed in the repair of French Renault and Schneider tanks. On 5 December 1918, French General Estienne gave the 2nd Battalion Air Service Mechanics permission to wear the insignia of the French Tank Corps." The helmet and service coat both bear the insignia of the French Tank Corps.

== Climate ==
This climatic region is typified by large seasonal temperature differences, with warm to hot (and often humid) summers and cold (sometimes severely cold) winters. According to the Köppen Climate Classification system, Leeds has a humid continental climate, abbreviated "Dfb" on climate maps.

Climate data for Leeds, North Dakota, 1991–2020 normals, 1935-2020 extremes: 1530ft (466m)
Month	Jan	Feb	Mar	Apr	May	Jun	Jul	Aug	Sep	Oct	Nov	Dec	Year
Record high °F (°C)	52 (11)	60 (16)	78 (26)	97 (36)	97 (36)	105 (41)	108 (42)	105 (41)	103 (39)	95 (35)	74 (23)	57 (14)	108 (42)
Mean maximum °F (°C)	39.9 (4.4)	44.0 (6.7)	54.7 (12.6)	77.2 (25.1)	86.8 (30.4)	90.5 (32.5)	92.7 (33.7)	94.9 (34.9)	89.1 (31.7)	78.4 (25.8)	57.0 (13.9)	41.8 (5.4)	95.7 (35.4)
Mean daily maximum °F (°C)	16.2 (−8.8)	20.5 (−6.4)	33.3 (0.7)	51.2 (10.7)	65.6 (18.7)	75.0 (23.9)	79.8 (26.6)	79.5 (26.4)	69.9 (21.1)	53.1 (11.7)	34.9 (1.6)	21.9 (−5.6)	50.1 (10.1)
Daily mean °F (°C)	6.5 (−14.2)	10.4 (−12.0)	22.9 (−5.1)	39.1 (3.9)	52.8 (11.6)	63.4 (17.4)	67.6 (19.8)	65.6 (18.7)	56.5 (13.6)	41.7 (5.4)	25.5 (−3.6)	12.6 (−10.8)	38.7 (3.7)
Mean daily minimum °F (°C)	−3.1 (−19.5)	0.3 (−17.6)	12.4 (−10.9)	26.9 (−2.8)	40.0 (4.4)	51.8 (11.0)	55.4 (13.0)	51.8 (11.0)	43.1 (6.2)	30.3 (−0.9)	16.2 (−8.8)	3.3 (−15.9)	27.4 (−2.6)
Mean minimum °F (°C)	−26.8 (−32.7)	−22.8 (−30.4)	−9.2 (−22.9)	12.9 (−10.6)	25.7 (−3.5)	39.8 (4.3)	44.0 (6.7)	40.7 (4.8)	27.4 (−2.6)	13.9 (−10.1)	−3.6 (−19.8)	−21.3 (−29.6)	−30.0 (−34.4)
Record low °F (°C)	−41 (−41)	−43 (−42)	−36 (−38)	−12 (−24)	12 (−11)	25 (−4)	34 (1)	28 (−2)	17 (−8)	−11 (−24)	−31 (−35)	−39 (−39)	−43 (−42)
Average precipitation inches (mm)	0.54 (14)	0.65 (17)	0.92 (23)	1.70 (43)	2.90 (74)	3.16 (80)	3.35 (85)	2.66 (68)	1.97 (50)	1.52 (39)	1.05 (27)	0.60 (15)	21.02 (535)
Average snowfall inches (cm)	9.1 (23)	6.6 (17)	7.6 (19)	3.6 (9.1)	1.0 (2.5)	0.0 (0.0)	0.0 (0.0)	0.0 (0.0)	0.1 (0.25)	2.6 (6.6)	7.1 (18)	8.4 (21)	46.1 (116.45)
Source 1: NOAA
Source 2: XMACIS (1991-2006 snowfall, records & 1981-2010 monthly max/mins)
