= Rugby, North Dakota =

- City
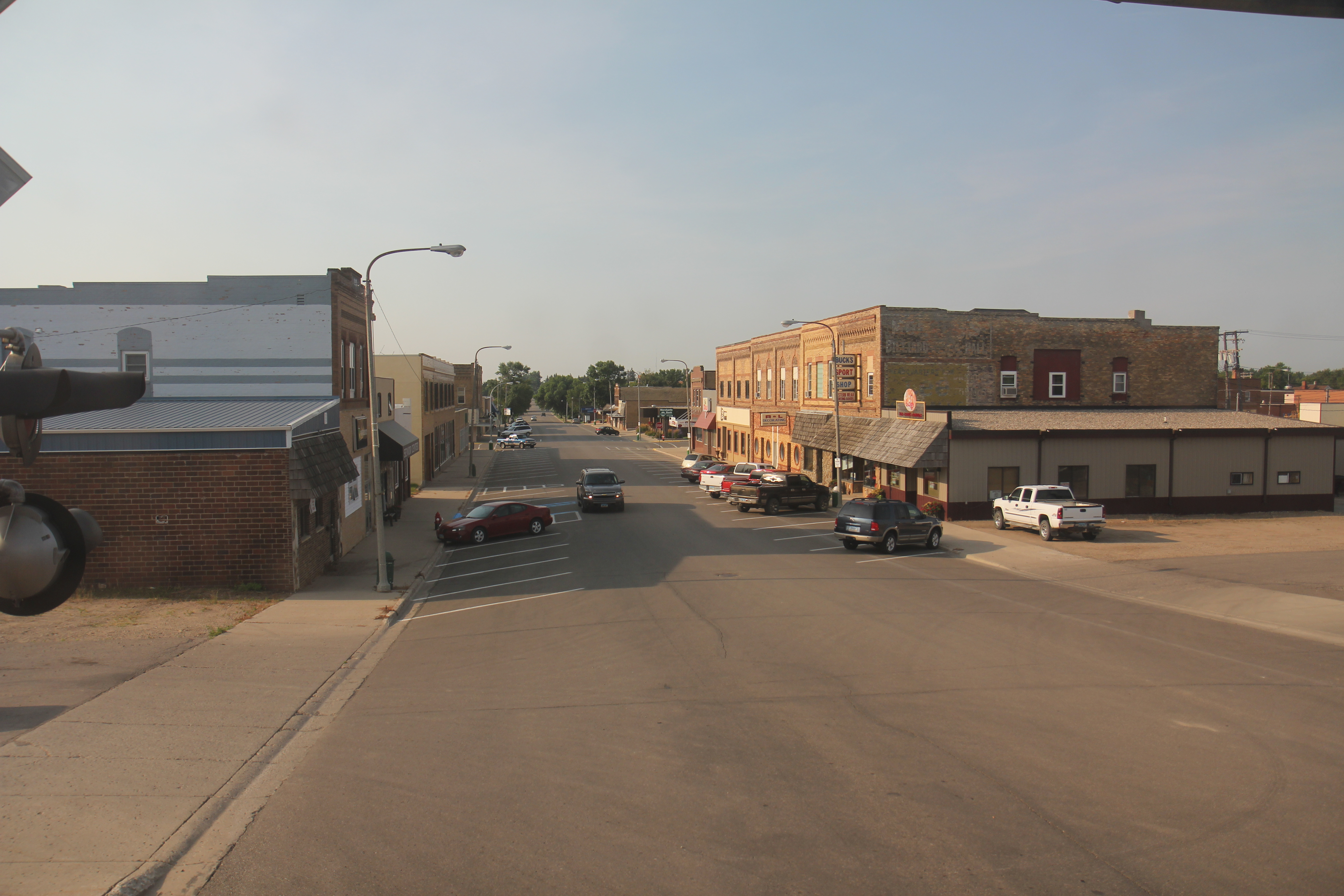
- Downtown Rugby

- Seal
- Motto: "Geographical Center of North America"
- Location of Rugby, North Dakota
- Coordinates: 48°21′55″N 99°59′25″W
- Country: United States
- State: North Dakota
- County: Pierce
- Founded: 1886

Government
  - Mayor: Frank Laroque

Area
  - Total: 2.30 sq mi (5.96 km^{2})
  - Land: 2.29 sq mi (5.92 km^{2})
  - Water: 0.015 sq mi (0.04 km^{2})
- Elevation: 1,540 ft (470 m)

Population (2020)
  - Total: 2,509
  - Estimate (2022): 2,481
  - Density: 1,098.0/sq mi (423.93/km^{2})
- Time zone: UTC-6 (Central (CST))
  - Summer (DST): UTC-5 (CDT)
- ZIP code: 58368
- Area code: 701
- FIPS code: 38-68860
- GNIS feature ID: 1036246
- Highways: US 2, ND 3
- Website: cityofrugbynd.com

Rugby is a city in and the county seat of Pierce County, North Dakota, United States. The population was 2,509 at the 2020 census, making it the 19th largest city in North Dakota. Rugby was founded in 1886.

Rugby is often billed as the geographic center of North America.

== History ==
Rugby was founded in 1886 at a junction on the Great Northern Railway, where a branch line to Bottineau met the main line. The railroad promoters initially platted the town as Rugby Junction, getting the name Rugby from the town of Rugby in Warwickshire, England. It was one of several sites along the Great Northern's transcontinental route between Devils Lake and Minot that were named after places in England (the others were Berwick, Leeds, Knox, Norwich, Penn, Surrey, Churches Ferry, Tunbridge, and York). When the community became a city, the Junction was dropped from the name.

North Dakota's first permanent settlers arrived in 1812 from the Earl of Selkirk's colony in neighboring Rupert's Land. As farmers, they were more advanced than many of their contemporaries in the rest of the United States, having adopted sophisticated farming methods and machinery. Many of these implements, including an early McCormick Deering threshing machine, have found their way to the restored Pioneer Village in Rugby.

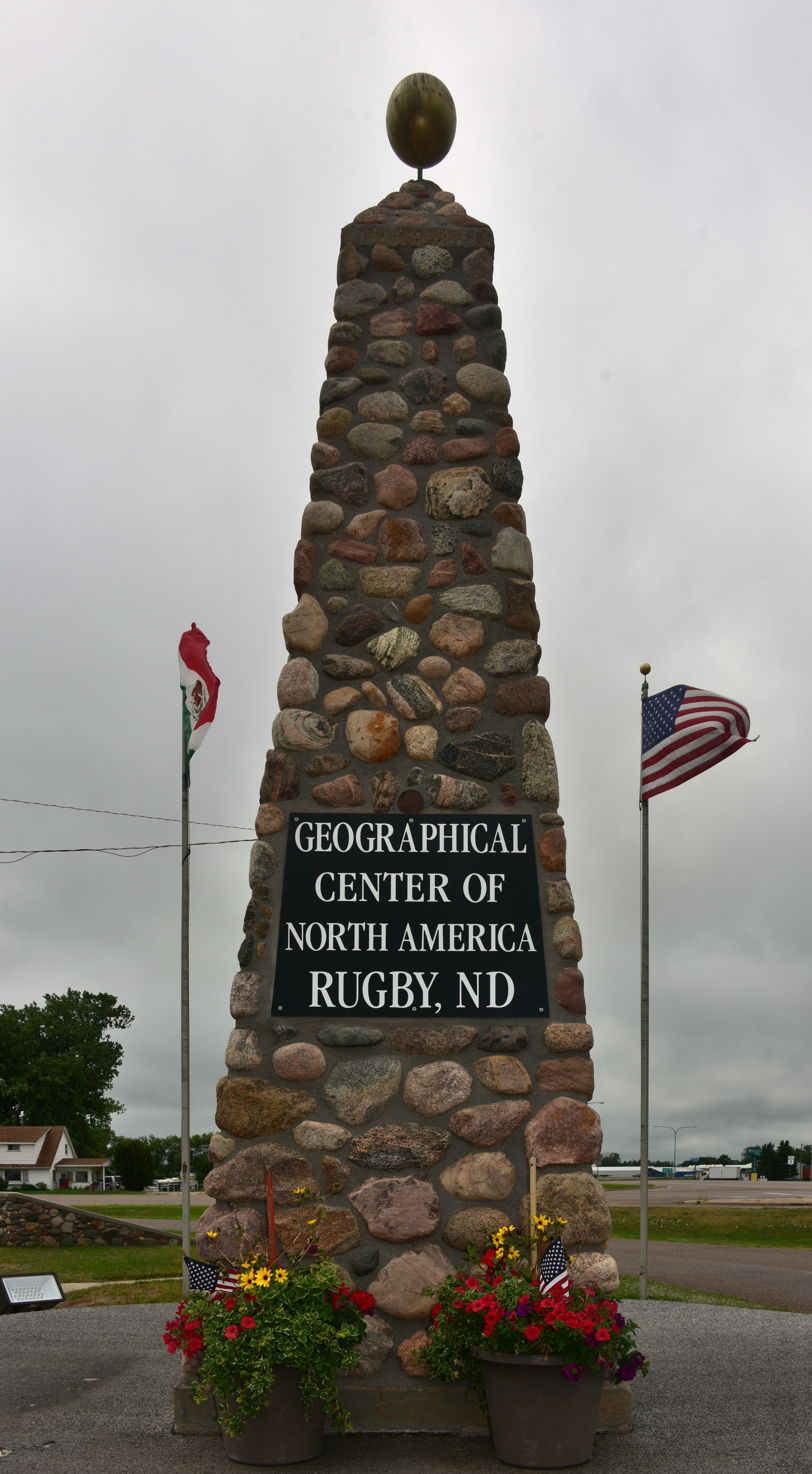
Obelisk near Rugby

In 1931, the town of Rugby erected a 15-foot-tall (4.6 m) rock obelisk marking the "Geographical Center of North America". This was moved to a slightly different location in 1971 with the expansion of US Highway 2. According to a listing by the U.S. Geological Survey, Rugby is actually approximately 15 miles (24 km) from the geographic center of North America (6 miles (9.7 km) west of Balta), and even this designation carries no official status.

== Geography ==
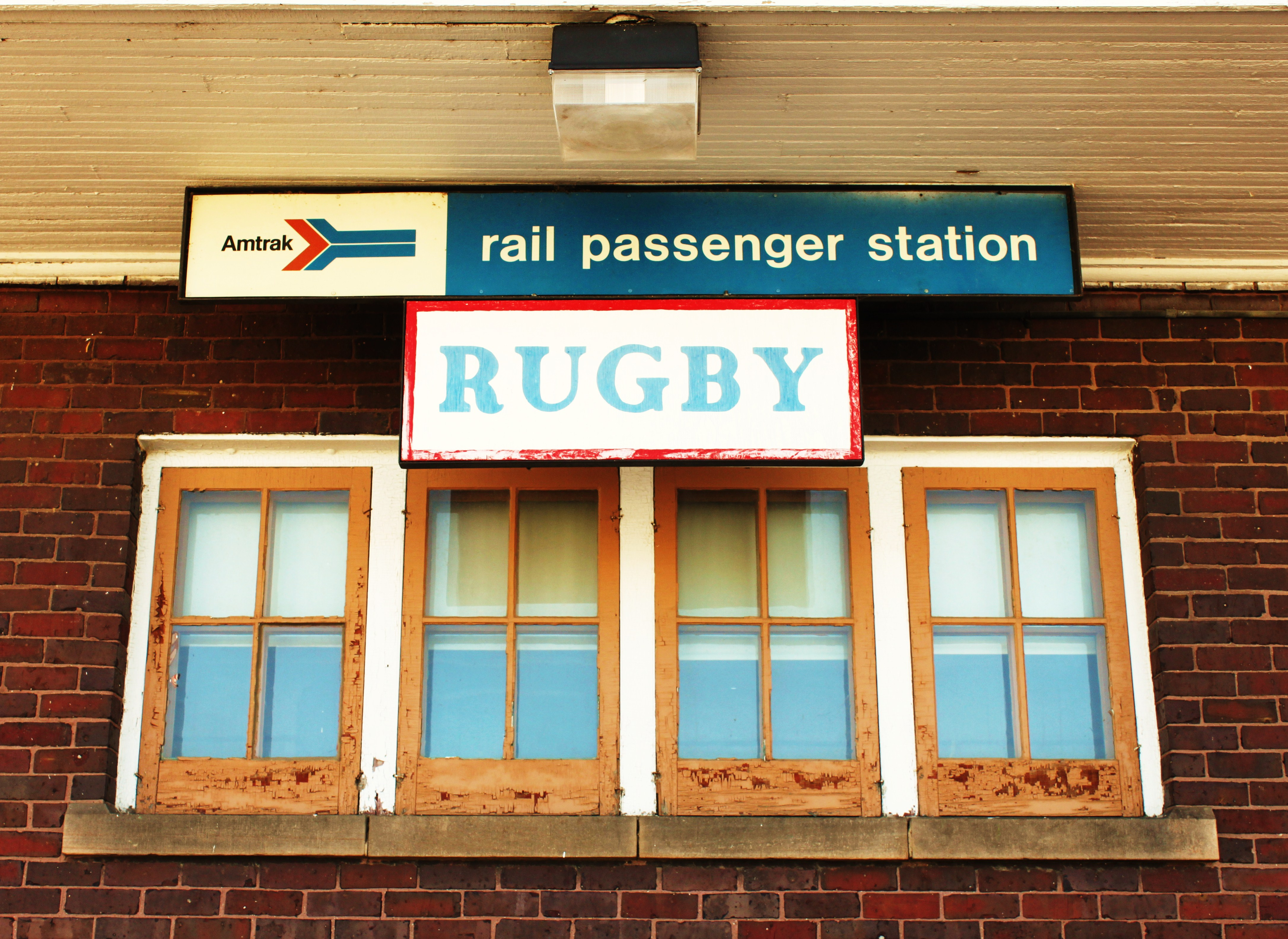
Amtrak train station

Rugby is located in eastern Pierce County at the intersection of US 2 and ND 3. The Great Northern Railroad line passes through the community. Minot lies 66 miles to the west along Route 2.

According to the United States Census Bureau, the city has a total area of 1.94 square miles (5.02 km^{2}), all land. Rugby claims to be the geographic center of North America and a monument stands in the city to signify this. The monument features flags of the United States, Canada, and Mexico. However, modern calculations that take on account the distortions caused by cartographic projections show that center is 105 miles southwest of Rugby, in a town called Center, North Dakota.

== Transportation ==
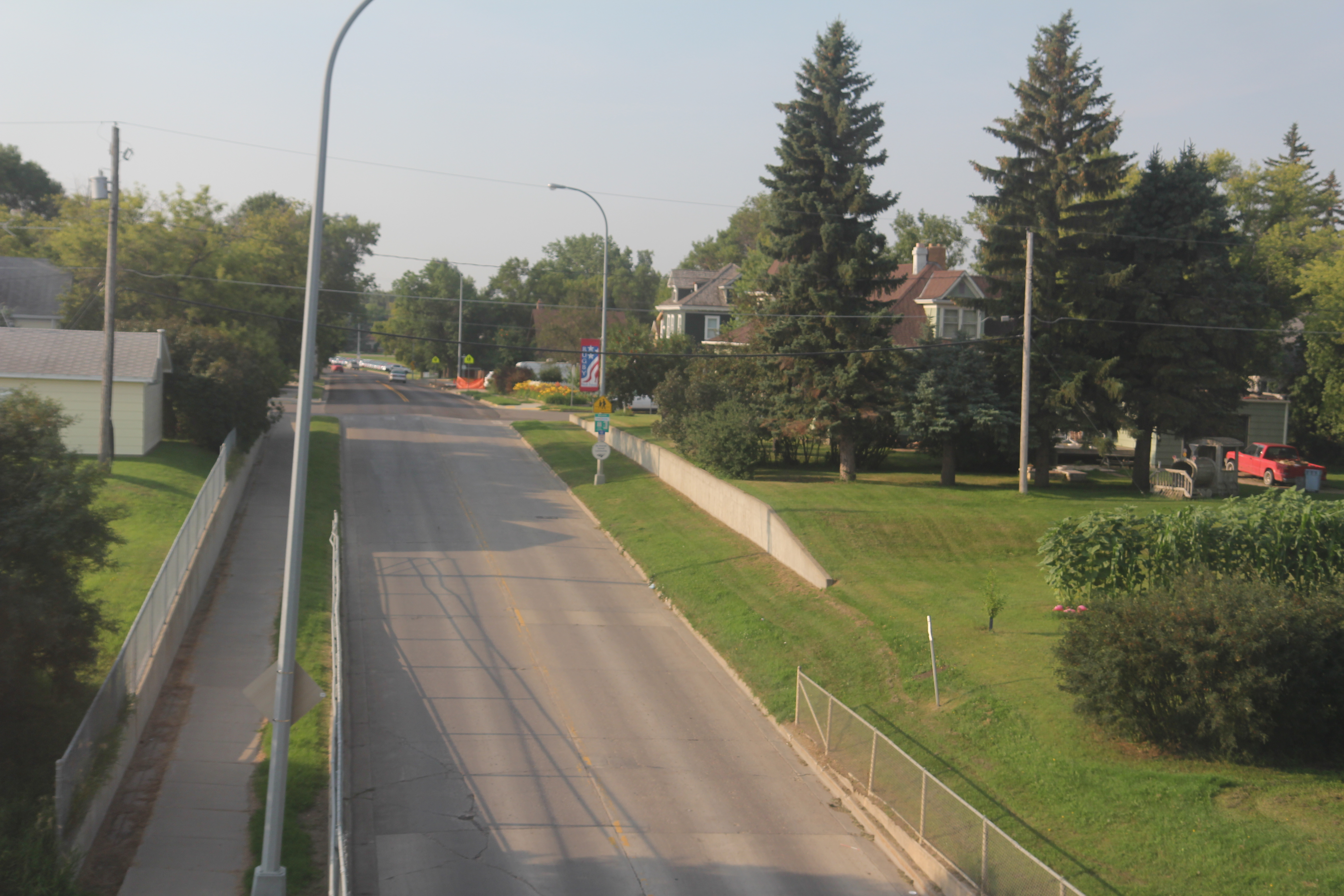
ND 3 in Rugby

=== Rail ===
Amtrak, the national passenger rail system, serves a station in Rugby via its Empire Builder, a once-daily train in each direction between Portland/Seattle and Chicago. The rail station was originally built by the Great Northern Railway in 1907 and has since undergone multiple renovations.

=== Highways ===
US 2 and ND 3 serve the Rugby area.

== Demographics ==
Historical population
Census	Pop.	Note	%±
1900	487		—
1910	1,630		234.7%
1920	1,424		−12.6%
1930	1,512		6.2%
1940	2,215		46.5%
1950	2,907		31.2%
1960	2,972		2.2%
1970	2,889		−2.8%
1980	3,335		15.4%
1990	2,909		−12.8%
2000	2,939		1.0%
2010	2,876		−2.1%
2020	2,509		−12.8%
2022 (est.)	2,481		−1.1%
U.S. Decennial Census; 2020 Census

=== 2020 census ===
As of the 2020 census, Rugby had a population of 2,509. The median age was 46.0 years. 19.8% of residents were under the age of 18 and 26.9% of residents were 65 years of age or older. For every 100 females there were 98.5 males, and for every 100 females age 18 and over there were 98.1 males age 18 and over.

0.0% of residents lived in urban areas, while 100.0% lived in rural areas.

There were 1,144 households in Rugby, of which 21.3% had children under the age of 18 living in them. Of all households, 43.1% were married-couple households, 20.6% were households with a male householder and no spouse or partner present, and 29.8% were households with a female householder and no spouse or partner present. About 39.8% of all households were made up of individuals and 20.5% had someone living alone who was 65 years of age or older.

There were 1,365 housing units, of which 16.2% were vacant. The homeowner vacancy rate was 2.0% and the rental vacancy rate was 20.2%.

Racial composition as of the 2020 census
Race	Number	Percent
White	2,220	88.5%
Black or African American	36	1.4%
American Indian and Alaska Native	132	5.3%
Asian	13	0.5%
Native Hawaiian and Other Pacific Islander	3	0.1%
Some other race	17	0.7%
Two or more races	88	3.5%
Hispanic or Latino (of any race)	54	2.2%

=== 2010 census ===
As of the census of 2010, there were 2,876 people, 1,239 households, and 697 families living in the city. The population density was 1,482.5 inhabitants per square mile (572.4/km^{2}). There were 1,407 housing units at an average density of 725.3 per square mile (280.0/km^{2}). The racial makeup of the city was 91.9% White, 0.3% African American, 5.8% Native American, 0.9% from other races, and 1.1% from two or more races. Hispanic or Latino of any race were 1.3% of the population.

There were 1,239 households, of which 23.2% had children under the age of 18 living with them, 46.2% were married couples living together, 6.9% had a female householder with no husband present, 3.2% had a male householder with no wife present, and 43.7% were non-families. 39.7% of all households were made up of individuals, and 20.2% had someone living alone who was 65 years of age or older. The average household size was 2.11 and the average family size was 2.83.

The median age in the city was 47 years. 20% of residents were under the age of 18; 6.1% were between the ages of 18 and 24; 21.1% were from 25 to 44; 26.2% were from 45 to 64; and 26.6% were 65 years of age or older. The gender makeup of the city was 48.7% male and 51.3% female.

=== 2000 census ===
As of the census of 2000, there were 2,939 people, 1,291 households, and 765 families living in the city. The population density was 1,520.1 inhabitants per square mile (586.9/km^{2}). There were 1,434 housing units at an average density of 741.7 per square mile (286.4/km^{2}). The racial makeup of the city was 98.09% White, 1.02% Native American, 0.37% Asian, 0.03% from other races, and 0.48% from two or more races. Hispanic or Latino of any race were 0.44% of the population.

The top six ancestry groups in the city are German (49.6%), Norwegian (40.5%), Irish (5.3%), English (4.0%), Russian (3.7%), French (3.6%).

There were 1,291 households, out of which 26.6% had children under the age of 18 living with them, 49.0% were married couples living together, 8.0% had a female householder with no husband present, and 40.7% were non-families. 37.3% of all households were made up of individuals, and 21.2% had someone living alone who was 65 years of age or older. The average household size was 2.17 and the average family size was 2.89.

In the city, the population was spread out, with 23.1% under the age of 18, 5.4% from 18 to 24, 23.1% from 25 to 44, 20.2% from 45 to 64, and 28.1% who were 65 years of age or older. The median age was 44 years. For every 100 females, there were 86.8 males. For every 100 females age 18 and over, there were 81.3 males.

The median income for a household in the city was $25,482, and the median income for a family was $35,745. Males had a median income of $25,885 versus $18,510 for females. The per capita income for the city was $14,380. About 9.6% of families and 13.7% of the population were below the poverty line, including 11.6% of those under age 18 and 19.1% of those age 65 or over.

== Notable people ==
- Todd "Boogie" Brandt, radio personality with The Todd and Tyler Radio Empire
- Harald Bredesen (1918–2006), Lutheran pastor
- Nichi Farnham, Maine state senator
- Reed Duchscher, talent manager, founder of Night
- Don Gaetz (born 1948), Florida politician
- Jerry Gaetz (1914–1964), North Dakota state senator and mayor of Rugby
- Samuel Kirk (1904–1996), psychologist and educator
- Jon Nelson (born 1953), member of the North Dakota House of Representatives
- Clifford Thompson (1904–1955), one of the world's tallest men
- Chris Tuchscherer (born 1975), mixed martial artist
- Larry Watson (born 1947), poet, writer, and educator

== Radio ==
- KZZJ AM 1450
- KKWZ FM 95.3

== Education ==
The city of Rugby is served by Rugby Public Schools: Ely Elementary School and Rugby High School. Little Flower Catholic School is also in Rugby.

== Sites of interest ==
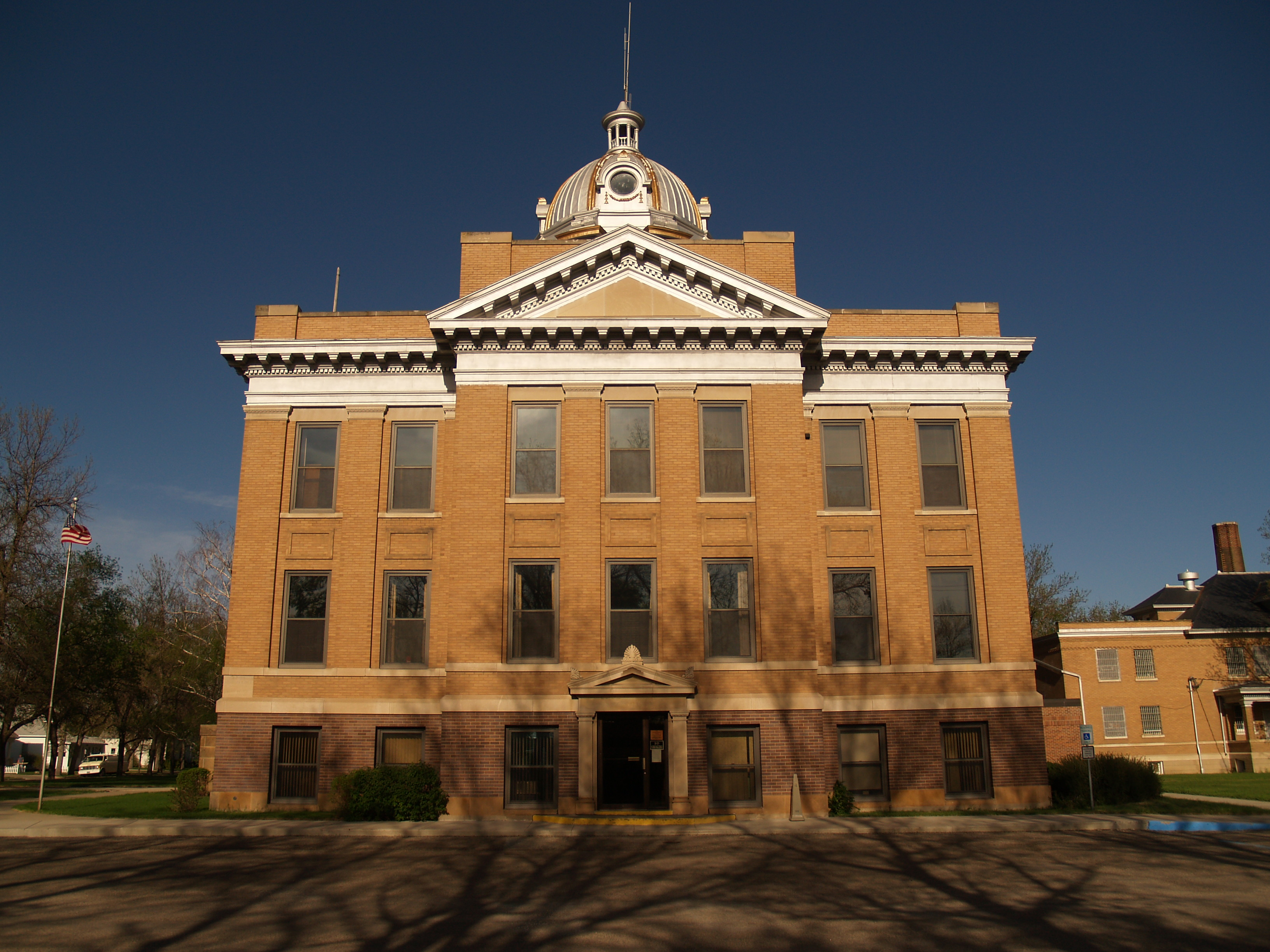
Pierce County Courthouse

- Geographical center of North America – Rugby is located in the geographical center of North America. There is a cairn marking this spot. Note: The validity of this claim is disputed by a mathematical analysis.
- Prairie Village Museum houses some of Pierce County's oldest historical buildings and artifacts including the 1886 Great Northern Railroad Depot.
- The Victorian Dress Museum – The building that houses the museum is listed in the National Register of Historic Places.
- Pierce County Courthouse - dating from 1908, listed on the National Register of Historic Places.

== Climate ==
This climatic region is typified by large seasonal temperature differences, with warm to hot (and often humid) summers and cold (sometimes severely cold) winters. According to the Köppen Climate Classification system, Rugby has a humid continental climate, abbreviated "Dfb" on climate maps.

Climate data for Rugby, North Dakota (1991–2020 normals, extremes 1904–present)
Month	Jan	Feb	Mar	Apr	May	Jun	Jul	Aug	Sep	Oct	Nov	Dec	Year
Record high °F (°C)	57 (14)	62 (17)	74 (23)	96 (36)	100 (38)	104 (40)	107 (42)	105 (41)	99 (37)	92 (33)	75 (24)	56 (13)	107 (42)
Mean daily maximum °F (°C)	15.9 (−8.9)	20.7 (−6.3)	33.8 (1.0)	52.0 (11.1)	66.1 (18.9)	74.8 (23.8)	79.9 (26.6)	79.7 (26.5)	69.8 (21.0)	53.6 (12.0)	34.8 (1.6)	21.3 (−5.9)	50.2 (10.1)
Daily mean °F (°C)	6.0 (−14.4)	10.6 (−11.9)	23.7 (−4.6)	40.0 (4.4)	53.2 (11.8)	62.9 (17.2)	67.5 (19.7)	66.3 (19.1)	56.7 (13.7)	41.9 (5.5)	25.3 (−3.7)	11.9 (−11.2)	38.8 (3.8)
Mean daily minimum °F (°C)	−3.9 (−19.9)	0.4 (−17.6)	13.6 (−10.2)	27.9 (−2.3)	40.3 (4.6)	51.0 (10.6)	55.1 (12.8)	53.0 (11.7)	43.5 (6.4)	30.2 (−1.0)	15.8 (−9.0)	2.6 (−16.3)	27.5 (−2.5)
Record low °F (°C)	−45 (−43)	−47 (−44)	−40 (−40)	−8 (−22)	14 (−10)	30 (−1)	37 (3)	30 (−1)	20 (−7)	−6 (−21)	−27 (−33)	−40 (−40)	−47 (−44)
Average precipitation inches (mm)	0.49 (12)	0.54 (14)	0.90 (23)	1.31 (33)	3.01 (76)	3.83 (97)	3.68 (93)	2.15 (55)	1.75 (44)	1.41 (36)	0.92 (23)	0.99 (25)	20.98 (533)
Average snowfall inches (cm)	8.0 (20)	6.4 (16)	6.5 (17)	2.9 (7.4)	0.9 (2.3)	0.0 (0.0)	0.0 (0.0)	0.0 (0.0)	0.0 (0.0)	3.3 (8.4)	7.4 (19)	8.0 (20)	43.4 (110)
Average precipitation days (≥ 0.01 in)	3.9	3.8	3.1	5.1	9.9	11.9	10.4	8.0	7.5	5.6	3.3	3.5	76.0
Average snowy days (≥ 0.1 in)	4.9	4.8	3.3	1.0	0.4	0.0	0.0	0.0	0.0	1.2	3.3	5.6	24.5
Source: NOAA
