= Rolette Public School District No. 29 =

School district headquartered in Rolette, North Dakota, US

Address
- 901 3rd Avenue NE Rolette, North Dakota, 58366; United States

District information
- Type: Public
- Grades: PreK–12
- NCES District ID: 3816050

Students and staff
- Students: 148
- Teachers: 19.35
- Staff: 13.22
- Student–teacher ratio: 7.65

Other information
- Website: www.roletteschool.k12.nd.us

Rolette Public School District No. 29 is a school district headquartered in Rolette, North Dakota. It operates Rolette Public School.

Within Rolette County, the district serves Rolette, Mylo, and small sections of Shell Valley.

== History ==
In 1968 there was an election on whether to increase the mills of the tax by 50%, but voters voted against it on a 217 against versus 156 for.

In 2002 the school had 215 students, and the rate of students attending tertiary education was about 90%. Bonnie Muehlberg in The Bismarck Tribune wrote that "As in many smaller communities, the school serves as a hub for activities and events."

When Wolford School District closed in 2019, Rolette School was an option for those students. Upon disestablishment of the Wolford district, Rolette is to take a portion of the district.
