= Leeds School District 6 =

School district in North Dakota, United States

Address
- 530 1st Street SE Leeds, North Dakota, 58346; United States

District information
- Type: Public
- Grades: PreK–12
- NCES District ID: 3810980

Students and staff
- Students: 117
- Teachers: 18.73
- Staff: 12.04
- Student–teacher ratio: 6.25

Other information
- Website: www.leeds.k12.nd.us

Leeds Public School District 6 is a school district based in Leeds, North Dakota. It operates Leeds Public School.

Within Benson County it serves Leeds, Brinsmade, and York. Within Ramsey County it serves Churchs Ferry. It also includes portions of Pierce and Towner counties.

== History ==
In 1958 the school district board was sued while trying to establish a school bond election, as the plaintiffs argued that the majority of the board was not from the rural areas that made up the majority of the district and therefore was not assembled properly under North Dakota law.

In 1987 there were 99 secondary level students. 66 of them were on the honor roll and 24 had consistent grades of "A". Donald Hoffman, the principal, stated that the students were meeting the rigorous standards of the district.

The Wolford School District was formally disestablished in 2019. Part of the district was to go to the Leeds district.
