= Balta, North Dakota =

- City
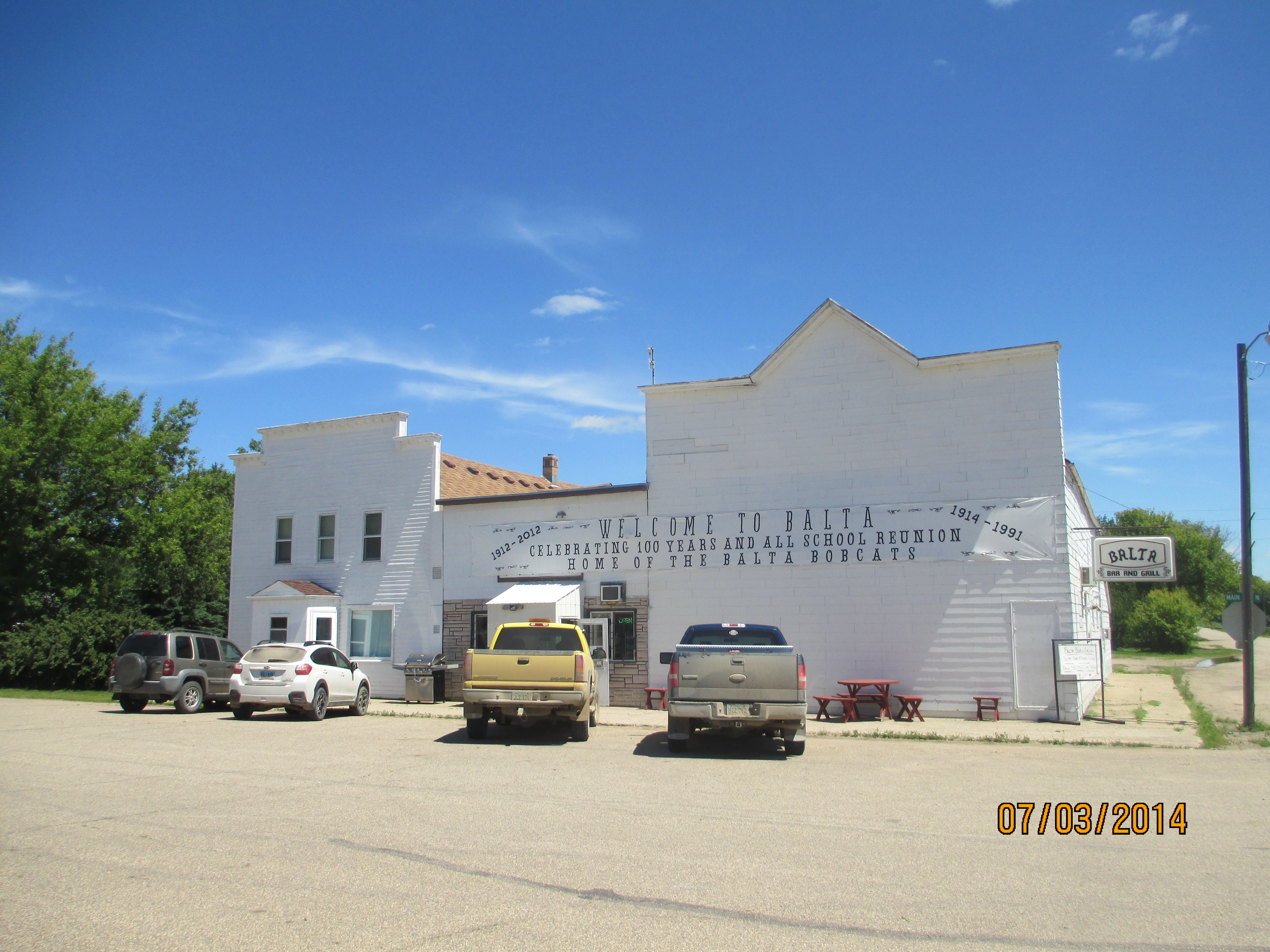

- Location of Balta, North Dakota
- Coordinates: 48°10′00″N 100°02′13″W
- Country: United States
- State: North Dakota
- County: Pierce
- Founded: 1912

Area
  - Total: 0.25 sq mi (0.66 km^{2})
  - Land: 0.23 sq mi (0.59 km^{2})
  - Water: 0.027 sq mi (0.07 km^{2})
- Elevation: 1,552 ft (473 m)

Population (2020)
  - Total: 66
  - Estimate (2022): 64
  - Density: 291.0/sq mi (112.34/km^{2})
- Time zone: UTC–6 (Central (CST))
  - Summer (DST): UTC–5 (CDT)
- ZIP Code: 58313
- Area code: 701
- FIPS code: 38-04580
- GNIS feature ID: 1035920

Balta is a city in Pierce County, North Dakota, United States. The population was 66 at the 2020 census. Balta was founded in 1912, and is known for its duck hunting.

Old Mt. Carmel Cemetery, Wrought-Iron Cross Site, in or near Balta, is listed on the National Register of Historic Places.

== History ==
Originally, the town was named Egan, in honor of Egan Pierce, an official with the Soo Line railroad. It was renamed by the locals after the city Balta in the Russian Empire (current Ukraine), the original home of many immigrant settlers.

== Geography ==
According to the United States Census Bureau, the city has a total area of 0.25 square miles (0.65 km^{2}), of which 0.22 square miles (0.57 km^{2}) is land and 0.03 square miles (0.08 km^{2}) is water.

According to the U.S. Geological Survey (which warns that "there is no generally accepted definition of a geographic center"), the center of the continent of North America is six miles west of Balta, at a latitude of 48°10' and a longitude of 100°10'. As Balta is so small, nearby Rugby calls itself the center of the continent.

== Demographics ==
Historical population
Census	Pop.	Note	%±
1940	263		—
1950	196		−25.5%
1960	165		−15.8%
1970	133		−19.4%
1980	139		4.5%
1990	79		−43.2%
2000	73		−7.6%
2010	65		−11.0%
2020	66		1.5%
2022 (est.)	64		−3.0%
U.S. Decennial Census; 2020 Census

=== 2010 census ===
As of the census of 2010, there were 65 people, 30 households, and 17 families residing in the city. The population density was 295.5 inhabitants per square mile (114.1/km^{2}). There were 47 housing units at an average density of 213.6 per square mile (82.5/km^{2}). The racial makeup of the city was 100.0% White.

There were 30 households, of which 23.3% had children under the age of 18 living with them, 43.3% were married couples living together, 6.7% had a female householder with no husband present, 6.7% had a male householder with no wife present, and 43.3% were non-families. 36.7% of all households were made up of individuals, and 16.7% had someone living alone who was 65 years of age or older. The average household size was 2.17 and the average family size was 2.71.

The median age in the city was 44.8 years. 21.5% of residents were under the age of 18; 9.3% were between the ages of 18 and 24; 20% were from 25 to 44; 32.3% were from 45 to 64; and 16.9% were 65 years of age or older. The gender makeup of the city was 58.5% male and 41.5% female.

=== 2000 census ===
As of the census of 2000, there were 73 people, 38 households, and 21 families residing in the city. The population density was 327.1 inhabitants per square mile (126.3/km^{2}). There were 49 housing units at an average density of 219.6 per square mile (84.8/km^{2}). The racial makeup of the city was 98.63% White, and 1.37% Asian.

There were 38 households, out of which 15.8% had children under the age of 18 living with them, 44.7% were married couples living together, 7.9% had a female householder with no husband present, and 44.7% were non-families. 39.5% of all households were made up of individuals, and 18.4% had someone living alone who was 65 years of age or older. The average household size was 1.92 and the average family size was 2.57.

In the city, the population was spread out, with 17.8% under the age of 18, 1.4% from 18 to 24, 31.5% from 25 to 44, 16.4% from 45 to 64, and 32.9% who were 65 years of age or older. The median age was 44 years. For every 100 females, there were 121.2 males. For every 100 females age 18 and over, there were 114.3 males.

The median income for a household in the city was $22,813, and the median income for a family was $24,688. Males had a median income of $14,375 versus $15,000 for females. The per capita income for the city was $10,645. There were 8.7% of families and 7.1% of the population living below the poverty line, including no under eighteens and 14.3% of those over 64.

== Education ==
It is within Rugby Public Schools, which operates Rugby High School.

== Climate ==
This climatic region is typified by large seasonal temperature differences, with warm to hot (and often humid) summers and cold (sometimes severely cold) winters. According to the Köppen Climate Classification system, Balta has a humid continental climate, abbreviated "Dfb" on climate maps.
