= Rugby Public Schools =

School district in North Dakota, US

Address
- 1123 S Main Ave Rugby, Pierce County, North Dakota; United States

District information
- Grades: PreK–12
- Schools: 2
- NCES District ID: 3816130

Students and staff
- Students: 617
- Teachers: 45.3 FTE
- Student–teacher ratio: 13.62:1

Other information
- Website: www.rugby.k12.nd.us

Rugby Public School District No. 5, also known as Rugby Public Schools, is a school district headquartered in Rugby, North Dakota.

It operates two schools: Ely Elementary School and Rugby High School.

In Pierce County, the district serves Rugby, Balta, Barton, and Orrin. Within Benson County, the district serves Knox. It also includes a section of Rolette County.

== History ==
In 1911, there was a mass gathering of voters where the school leadership addressed issues.

In 1972, the district sought to change its taxation to a six mill total increase so that it could expand the secondary school building.

Dale Bader became the superintendent on July 1, 1976.

In 2019 Wolford School District was disestablished. Rugby Public Schools received a part of the district.
