= KKWZ =

- Rugby, North Dakota; United States
- Frequency: 95.3 MHz
- Branding: KOOL AC 95.3 FM

Programming
- Format: Adult contemporary
- Affiliations: ABC News Radio

Ownership
- Owner: Rugby Broadcasters, Inc.
- Sister stations: KZZJ

History
- First air date: 2016

Technical information
- Licensing authority: FCC
- Facility ID: 165964
- Class: A
- ERP: 6,000 watts
- HAAT: 45 meters (148 ft)
- Transmitter coordinates: type:city 48°21′15.00″N 99°59′32.00″W

Links
- Public license information: Public file; LMS
- Webcast: Listen Live
- Website: www.rugbybroadcasters.com

KKWZ (95.3 FM) is a radio station broadcasting an adult contemporary format.

KKWZ is licensed to the city of Rugby, North Dakota and is owned by Rugby Broadcasters, Inc. Its studios and transmitter are at 230 Hwy 2 SE in Rugby, shared with sister station KZZJ.
