= Knox, North Dakota =

Knox
- City
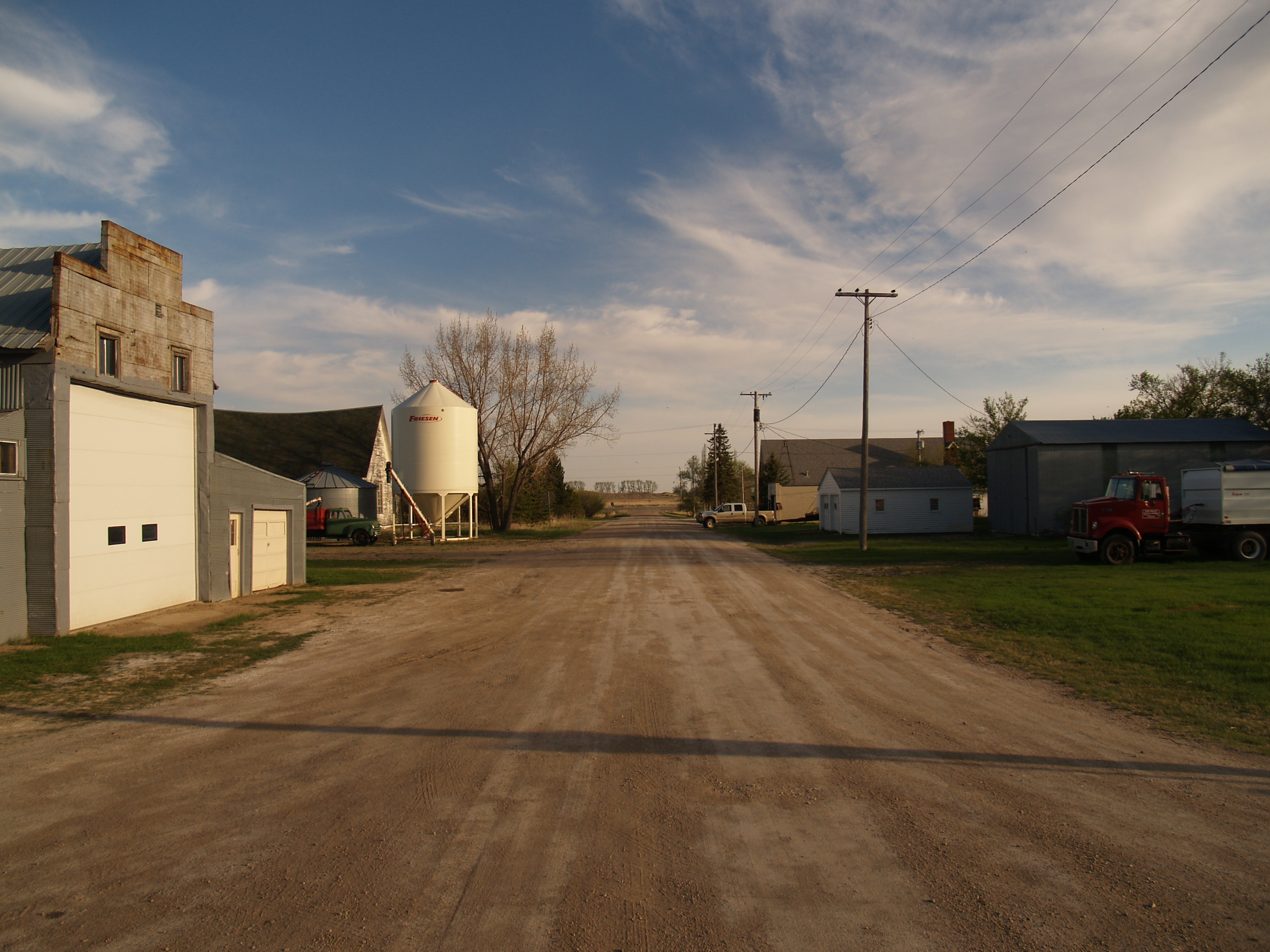
- Street in Knox

- Location of Knox, North Dakota
- Coordinates: 48°20′38″N 99°41′28″W
- Country: United States
- State: North Dakota
- County: Benson
- Founded: 1887

Area
  - Total: 0.48 sq mi (1.25 km^{2})
  - Land: 0.48 sq mi (1.25 km^{2})
  - Water: 0 sq mi (0.00 km^{2})
- Elevation: 1,604 ft (489 m)

Population (2020)
  - Total: 22
  - Estimate (2022): 21
  - Density: 45.6/sq mi (17.62/km^{2})
- Time zone: UTC-6 (Central (CST))
  - Summer (DST): UTC-5 (CDT)
- ZIP Code: 58343
- Area code: 701
- FIPS code: 38-43260
- GNIS feature ID: 1036110

Knox is a city in Benson County, North Dakota, United States. The population was 22 at the 2020 census. Knox was founded in 1887.

== Geography ==
According to the United States Census Bureau, the city has a total area of 0.50 square miles (1.29 km^{2}), all land.

== Demographics ==
Historical population
Census	Pop.	Note	%±
1910	330		—
1920	173		−47.6%
1930	177		2.3%
1940	189		6.8%
1950	190		0.5%
1960	122		−35.8%
1970	104		−14.8%
1980	69		−33.7%
1990	45		−34.8%
2000	59		31.1%
2010	25		−57.6%
2020	22		−12.0%
2022 (est.)	21		−4.5%
U.S. Decennial Census; 2020 Census

=== 2010 census ===
As of the census of 2010, there were 25 people, 13 households, and 6 families living in the city. The population density was 50.0 inhabitants per square mile (19.3/km^{2}). There were 26 housing units at an average density of 52.0 per square mile (20.1/km^{2}). The racial makeup of the city was 100.0% White.

There were 13 households, of which 7.7% had children under the age of 18 living with them, 38.5% were married couples living together, 7.7% had a female householder with no husband present, and 53.8% were non-families. 30.8% of all households were made up of individuals, and 30.8% had someone living alone who was 65 years of age or older. The average household size was 1.92 and the average family size was 2.50.

The median age in the city was 59.8 years. 8% of residents were under the age of 18; 4% were between the ages of 18 and 24; 16% were from 25 to 44; 36% were from 45 to 64; and 36% were 65 years of age or older. The gender makeup of the city was 48.0% male and 52.0% female.

=== 2000 census ===
As of the census of 2000, there were 59 people, 22 households, and 13 families living in the city. The population density was 118.6 people per square mile (45.8 people/km^{2}). There were 28 housing units at an average density of 56.3 per square mile (21.7/km^{2}). The racial makeup of the city was 96.61% White, 1.69% African American, 1.69% from other races. Hispanic or Latino of any race were 3.39% of the population.

There were 22 households, out of which 31.8% had children under the age of 18 living with them, 54.5% were married couples living together, 4.5% had a female householder with no husband present, and 36.4% were non-families. 27.3% of all households were made up of individuals, and 22.7% had someone living alone who was 65 years of age or older. The average household size was 2.68 and the average family size was 3.36.

In the city, the population was spread out, with 37.3% under the age of 18, 6.8% from 18 to 24, 15.3% from 25 to 44, 28.8% from 45 to 64, and 11.9% who were 65 years of age or older. The median age was 35 years. For every 100 females, there were 90.3 males. For every 100 females age 18 and over, there were 85.0 males.

The median income for a household in the city was $22,500, and the median income for a family was $30,000. Males had a median income of $33,125 versus $14,167 for females. The per capita income for the city was $12,808. There were 14.3% of families and 18.4% of the population living below the poverty line, including 25.0% of under eighteens and none of those over 64.

== Transportation ==
Amtrak’s Empire Builder, which operates between Seattle/Portland and Chicago, passes through the town on BNSF tracks, but makes no stop. The nearest station is located in Rugby, 16 miles (26 km) to the west.

== Education ==
It is within Rugby Public Schools, which operates Rugby High School.
