= Lake Ibsen =

Lake in the state of North Dakota, United States

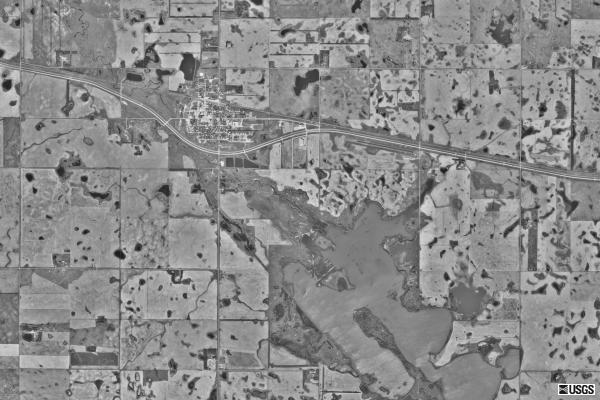
- To the southeast of Leeds

- Location within North Dakota Location within the United States
- Location: Benson County, North Dakota, United States
- Coordinates: 48°15′37″N 99°24′04″W
- Primary inflows: Little Coulee
- Primary outflows: Little Coulee
- Basin countries: United States
- Max. length: 4,200 m (13,800 ft)
- Max. width: 2,100 m (6,900 ft)
- Surface elevation: 454 m (1,490 ft)
- Islands: The Island (peninsula)
- Settlements: Leeds

Lake Ibsen is a small lake near Leeds in Benson County, North Dakota. The stream Little Coulee flows from Hurricane Lake, through Lake Ibsen, to Silver Lake. Lake Ibsen got its name from Norwegian settlers in the 1850s who named it after Henrik Ibsen. The Lake Ibson township is located nearby.
