= Night (company) =

American talent management company

- Industry: Talent management
- Founded: 2015; 11 years ago
- Founder: Reed Duchscher
- Headquarters: Dallas, Texas, United States
- Key people: Reed Duchscher CEO; Ezra Cooperstein President
- Website: night.co

Night Inc. is an American digital talent management, venture studio, and media investment company founded in 2015 by Reed Duchscher. Through its talent management arm Night Media, the company currently manages digital internet creators, musicians, and entertainers including Kai Cenat, Mrwhosetheboss, T-Pain, Hasan Piker, ZHC, The Costco Guys, Cold Ones (Maxmoefoe & Anything4views), and Safiya Nygaard. The firm previously managed MrBeast from 2018 to May 2024. Since its founding, the company has expanded into venture capital investing (Night Capital), original programming (Night Studios), seed-stage investing (Night Ventures), as well as maintaining its original talent management firm, Night Media. Duchscher is the CEO while the president since 2020 is Ezra Cooperstein, an early employee of the now-defunct Fullscreen and the former president of Rooster Teeth.

In 2021, the company launched a US$20,000,000 investment fund titled Night Ventures focusing on "consumer-facing startups" which can then have access to the talent within Night Media. In 2022, the company created an in-house studio for producing content which will be led by the former Head of Unscripted Originals at YouTube, Alex Piper.

Also in 2022, the company received two investments from the Chernin Group. One investment of US$100,000,000 went towards founding Night Capital, an investment firm founded by Duchscher and jointly owned by Night and the Chernin Group. The firm aims to invest in creators who can create profitable businesses, akin to the success of MrBeast and MrBeast Burger. TCG also invested an undisclosed sum into the talent management portion of the business. In April of 2024, the group acquired The Roost podcast network which includes these shows: This Past Weekend with Theo Von, the H3 Podcast, The Phil DeFranco Show, and The Yard. The Roost's network of original shows received over 350 million views and 20 million monthly audio downloads as of April 2024.
