= Rugby High School =

Public school in Rugby, North Dakota, US

Coordinates: 48°21′33″N 99°59′38″W

Location
- 1123 S Main Ave; Rugby, North Dakota 58368; USA

Information
- Type: Public
- School district: Rugby Public Schools
- Principal: Jared Blikre
- Teaching staff: 24.30 (FTE)
- Grades: 7-12
- Enrollment: 305 (2023–2024)
- Student to teacher ratio: 12.55
- Colors: Orange and black
- Mascot: Panther
- Website: Rugby High School

Rugby High School is a public high school located in Rugby, North Dakota. It is a part of Rugby Public Schools. The athletic teams are known as the Panthers.

Rugby High serves Rugby, Balta, Barton, and Orrin in Pierce County, and Knox in Benson County. The district also includes a section of Rolette County.

Its projected high school enrollment for the 1988–1989 school year was 259.

== Athletics ==
In 1988 the North Dakota High School Activities Association classified Rugby High School as Class A. That year the school was seeking to be placed in Class B and formally petitioned to do so.

=== Championships ===
- State Class 'B' boys' basketball: 1940, 1941, 2015
- State Class 'A' boys' basketball: 1962
- State Class 'B' boys' track and field: 1992, 1996, 2010
- State Class 'B' boys' cross country: 2009, 2011
- State Class 'B' girls' cross country: 2010, 2019, 2020, 2021, 2022
- State Class 'B' girls' track and field: 2009, 2011, 2019
