= Penn, North Dakota =

Penn
- Unincorporated community
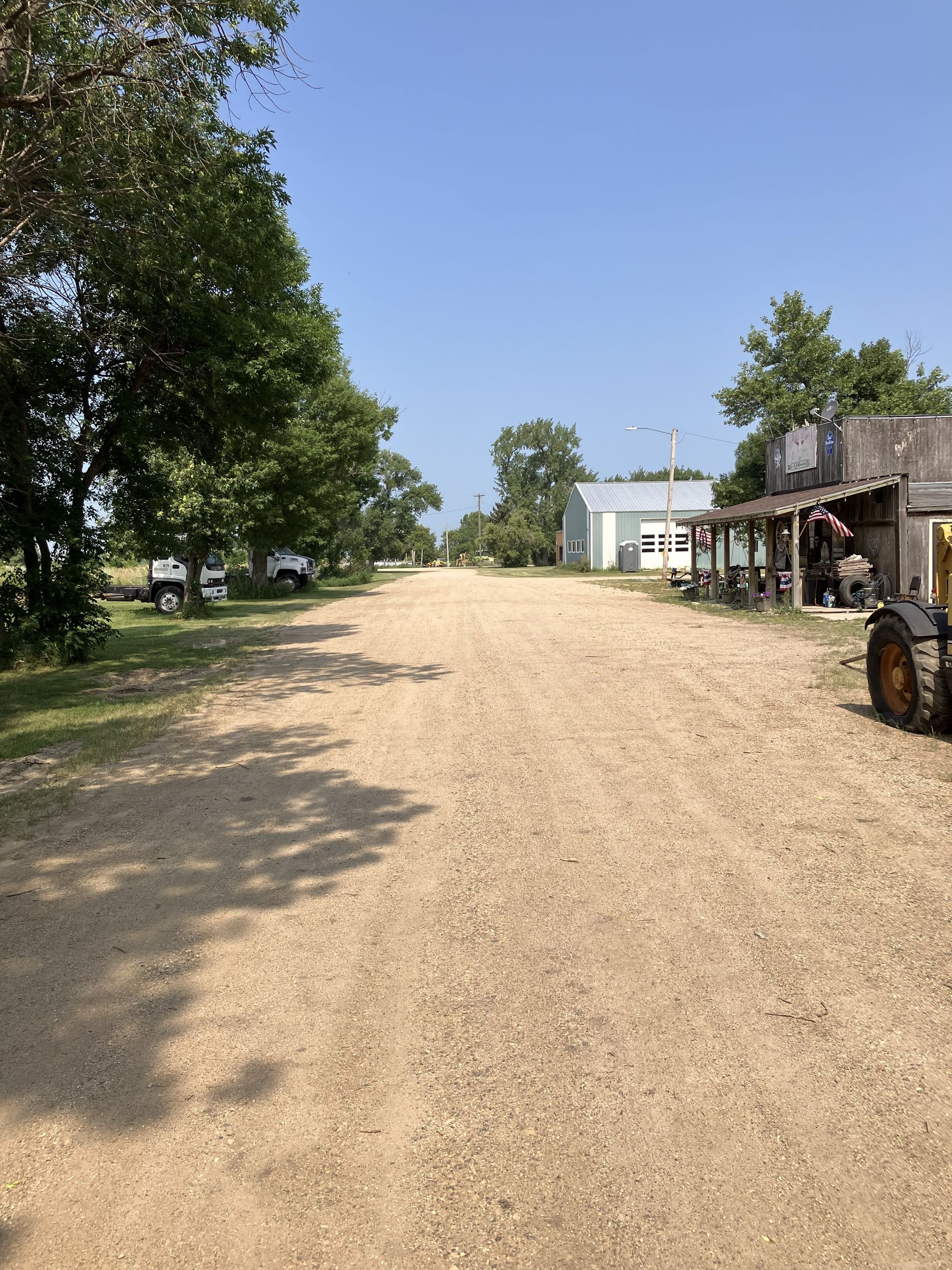

- Location within the state of North Dakota Penn (the United States)
- Coordinates: 48°13′18″N 99°5′20″W
- Country: United States
- State: North Dakota
- County: Ramsey
- Elevation: 1,467 ft (447 m)
- Time zone: UTC-6 (Central (CST))
  - Summer (DST): UTC-5 (CDT)
- ZIP codes: 58362
- Area code: 701
- GNIS feature ID: 1030673

Penn (also Lauren) is an unincorporated community in western Ramsey County, North Dakota, United States. It lies along U.S. Route 2, northwest of the city of Devils Lake, the county seat of Ramsey County. Its elevation is 1,467 feet (447 m). The community was first named Lauren for the townsite owner, Lauren, and was later renamed Penn for English stockholders. It has a post office with the ZIP code 58362.

== Devil's Lake ==
It is reported that the State and Federal Governments have bought out parts of the town because Devils Lake is expanding and will soon engulf the town with flood waters.

== Transportation ==
Amtrak’s Empire Builder, which operates between Seattle/Portland and Chicago, passes through the town on BNSF tracks, but makes no stop. The nearest station is located in Devils Lake, 13 miles (21 km) to the southeast.
