= North Dakota Highway 22 =

State highway in North Dakota, US

North Dakota Highway 22
- ND 22 highlighted in red

Route information
- Maintained by NDDOT
- Length: 156.051 mi (251.140 km)

Major junctions
- South end: SD 79 near Reeder
- US 12 near Reeder; I-94 in Dickinson; ND 200 in Killdeer
- North end: ND 23 near New Town

Location
- Country: United States
- State: North Dakota
- Counties: Adams, Hettinger, Stark, Dunn, McKenzie

Highway system
- North Dakota State Highway System; Interstate; US; State
← ND 21	→ ND 23

North Dakota Highway 22 (ND 22) is a 156.051-mile-long (251.140 km) major north–south state highway in North Dakota. It begins at the South Dakota state line south of the small town of Reeder and ends at ND 23 west of New Town and north of Mandaree. The route has one concurrency with U.S. Route 12 (US 12). The highway widely parallels US 85, running about fifteen miles east of it.

== Route description ==
North Dakota Highway 22 begins at the South Dakota state line as a continuation of South Dakota Highway 79. From there it heads north to the town of Reeder. North of Reeder, the route joins U.S. Route 12, heading southeast for two miles. It then heads north, joining with Highway 21 south of New England. Highway 21's concurrency with Highway 22 ends at New England, and Highway 22 continues north to Dickinson, where it has a truck detour around a low railroad bridge before it meets ND 22 Bypass, Interstate 94 Bus. Loop and Interstate 94 itself. In Dickinson, it is known as South Main Avenue and 3rd Avenue West.

ND 22 continues north past the city of Manning, to meet Highway 200 in of the city of Killdeer. The highway enters the Badlands 12 miles north of Killdeer and crosses the Little Missouri River switching from Mountain Time to Central Time.

The route continues just west of Mandaree, then meets Highway 73, and finally ends at Highway 23 in an unpopulated area west of Lake Sakakawea and New Town in McKenzie County.

== Major intersections ==
County	Location	mi	km	Destinations	Notes
Harding		0.000	0.000	SD 79 – Reva	Continuation into South Dakota
Adams	Reeder	11.929	19.198	US 12 west – Bowman	Southern end of US 12 concurrency
Adams		16.186	26.049	US 12 east – Hettinger	Northern end of US 12 concurrency
Hettinger		37.564	60.453	ND 21 east – Regent, Mott	Southern end of ND 21 concurrency
Hettinger	New England	45.619	73.417	ND 21 west – Amidon	Northern end of ND 21 concurrency
Stark	Dickinson	70.882	114.074	I-94 BL (Villard Street)	
Stark	Dickinson	72.057	115.965	I-94 – Billings, Bismarck	I-94 exit 61
Stark		74.623	120.094	ND 22 south (33rd Street SW)	ND 22 Dickinson Truck Bypass
Dunn	Killdeer	104.534	168.231	ND 200 east / ND 22 Bus. north – Beulah	Southern end of ND 200 concurrency, southern terminus of ND 22B, Roundabout
Dunn		105.710	170.124	ND 200 west – Grassy Butte	Northern end of ND 200 concurrency, Roundabout
Dunn		109.518	176.252	ND 22 Bus. south – Killdeer	Northern terminus of ND 22B
McKenzie		141.099	227.077	ND 73 west – Watford City	Eastern terminus of ND 73
McKenzie		156.051	251.140	ND 23 – Watford City, New Town	Northern terminus
1.000 mi = 1.609 km; 1.000 km = 0.621 mi: Concurrency terminus

== Killdeer business route ==
State Route 22 Business
- Location: Killdeer
- Length: 5.052 mi (8.130 km)

North Dakota Highway 22 Business (ND 22 Bus.) is a 5.052-mile-long (8.130 km) north–south state highway in the U.S. state of North Dakota. ND 22 Bus.'s southern terminus is at ND 22 and ND 200 in Killdeer, and the northern terminus is at ND 22 northwest of Killdeer.

The entire route is in Dunn County.

Location	mi	km	Destinations	Notes
Killdeer	0.000	0.000	ND 22 / ND 200	Southern terminus
	5.052	8.130	ND 22	Northern terminus
1.000 mi = 1.609 km; 1.000 km = 0.621 mi

== Dickinson bypass route ==
State Route 22 Truck
- Location: near Dickinson
- Length: 7.751 mi (12.474 km)

North Dakota Highway 22 Bypass (ND 22 Bypass) is a 7.051-mile-long (11.347 km)north–south state highway in the U.S. state of North Dakota. ND 22 Bypass's southern terminus is at Interstate 94 west of Dickinson (I-94 exit 56), and the northern terminus is at ND 22 north of Dickinson.

The entire route is in Stark County.

Location	mi	km	Destinations	Notes
	0.000	0.000	I-94 – Billings, Bismarck	Southern terminus, I-94 exit 56
	7.751	12.474	ND 22 – Killdeer, Dickinson	Northern terminus
1.000 mi = 1.609 km; 1.000 km = 0.621 mi
