= North Dakota Highway 23 =

State highway in North Dakota, US

North Dakota Highway 23
- ND 23 highlighted in red

Route information
- Maintained by NDDOT
- Length: 122.581 mi (197.275 km)
- Existed: before 1940–present

Major junctions
- West end: US 85 / ND 200 near Watford City
- ND 1804 from New Town to Parshall; ND 8 near Van Hook; US 83 near Max
- East end: ND 41 near Velva

Location
- Country: United States
- State: North Dakota
- Counties: McKenzie, Mountrail, Ward, McHenry

Highway system
- North Dakota State Highway System; Interstate; US; State
← ND 22	→ ND 23A

North Dakota Highway 23 (ND 23) is a 122.581-mile-long (197.275 km) east–west highway in northwestern North Dakota. ND 23's eastern terminus is at ND 41 near Velva, and its western terminus at U.S. Route 85 (US 85) in Watford City.

The only cities that ND 23 runs directly through are New Town and Watford City. It also runs through the unincorporated community of Keene. Other cities near the route include Makoti, Parshall, Plaza, Ryder, and Velva. Minot is 16 miles (26 km) north of the highway at its intersection with US 83.

== Route description ==
ND 23 has its western terminus at a junction with US 85 and ND 200 in Watford City. The route starts concurrently with U.S. Route 85 Business (US 85 Bus.) for a short distance. It starts running north for less than a mile, then east outside of the city limits. After leaving Watford City, the route intersects with the first section of ND 1806, to which it serves as the southern terminus. The route then turns due north for about six miles at an intersection with ND 73. ND 23 then runs north through the small community of Keene. After turning eastward once more, the route shares another intersection with ND 1806 serving as the southern terminus of its second section. ND 23 intersects with ND 22 before leaving McKenzie County and entering Mountrail County by crossing Lake Sakakawea on the Four Bears Bridge.

Just after entering Mountrail County, ND 23 has a junction with ND 1804 in New Town. This is the western end of a concurrency with ND 1804 in which ND 1804 is unsigned. Heading eastward seven more miles, the route serves as the southern terminus of ND 8. Just north of Parshall the route serves as the northern terminus of ND 37. This junction is also the eastern end of the route's concurrency with ND 1804. The route then runs three miles south of Plaza before entering Ward County.

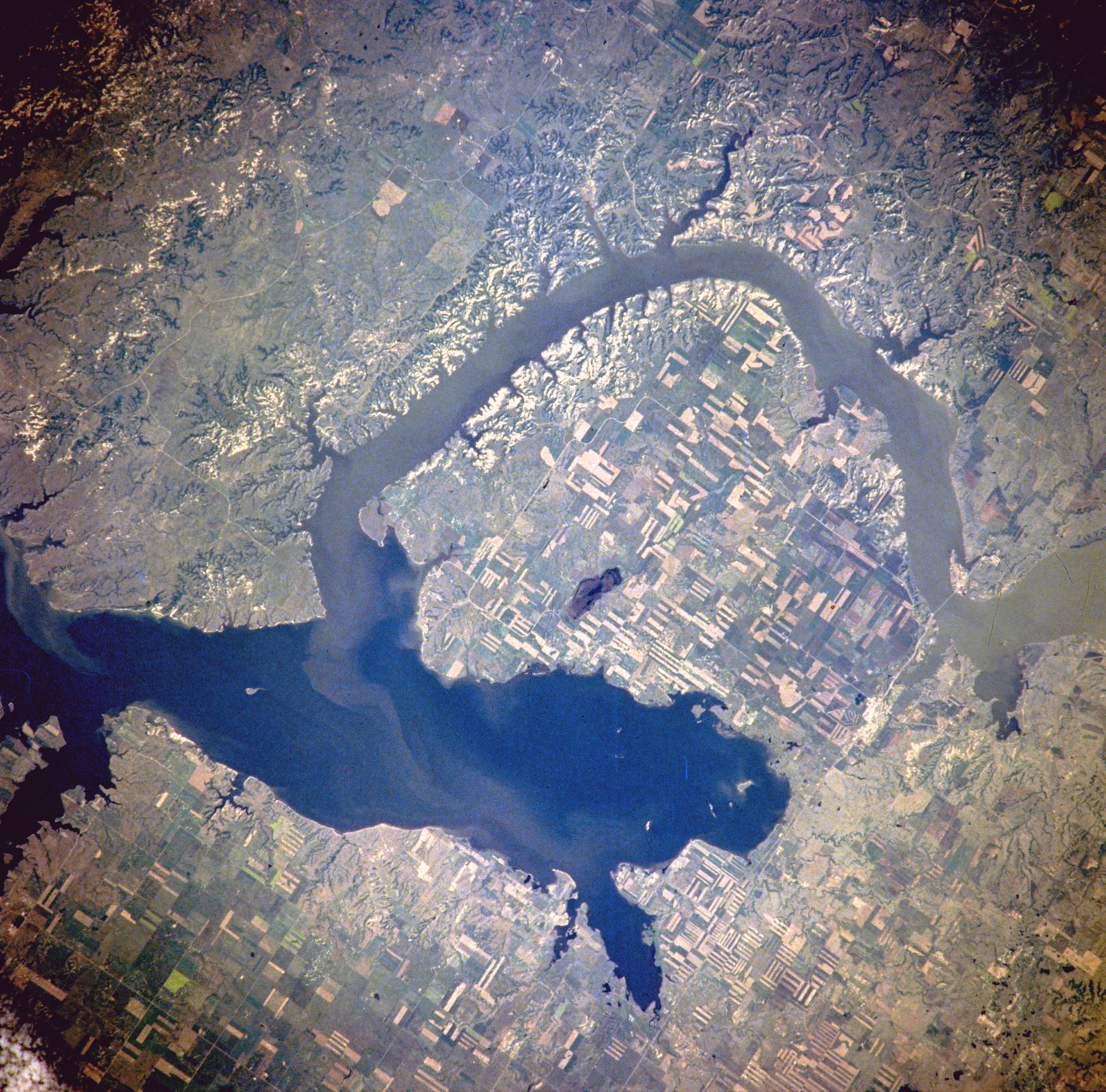
ND 23 can be seen in this satellite image passing the Van Hook Arm of Lake Sakakawea before passing New Town to cross the Missouri river at Four Bears Bridge

Two miles east of the county line, ND 23 runs just north of Makoti. The highway then serves as the northern terminus of ND 28, a short route that connects ND 23 to the small city of Ryder. Ten miles north of Max and sixteen miles south of Minot, ND 23 intersects US 83 before entering McHenry County. In McHenry County the highway travels east for about fifteen miles before meeting its eastern terminus south of Velva at ND 41.

== Major intersections ==
County	Location	mi	km	Destinations	Notes
McKenzie		0.000	0.000	US 85 / US 85 Bus. north / ND 200 – Williston, Belfield, Killdeer	Western terminus; southern terminus of US 85 Bus.
McKenzie		0.533	0.858	US 85 Bus. north / ND 23 Bus. east (Main Street) – Watford City	Eastern end of US 85 Bus. concurrency, western terminus of ND 23 Bus.
McKenzie		3.701	5.956	ND 1806 north / ND 23 Bus. west	Southern terminus of segment of ND 1806, eastern terminus of ND 23 Bus.
McKenzie		16.397	26.388	ND 73 east	Western terminus of ND 73
McKenzie		31.339	50.435	ND 1806 north (107th Avenue NW)	Southern terminus of segment of ND 1806
McKenzie		38.209	61.491	ND 22 south – Mandaree, Killdeer, Dickinson	Northern terminus of ND 22
Mountrail	New Town	49.420	79.534	ND 1804 north – Williston	Western end of ND 1804 concurrency
Mountrail		51.446	82.794	ND 23B Truck west	Eastern terminus of ND 23B Truck
Mountrail		56.405	90.775	ND 8 north – Stanley	Southern terminus of ND 8
Mountrail		66.370	106.812	ND 37 east / ND 1804 south – Parshall, Garrison	Western terminus of ND 37; Eastern end of ND 1804 concurrency
Ward		87.261	140.433	ND 28 south (254th Street SW) – Ryder	Northern terminus of ND 28
Ward		105.517	169.813	US 83 – Bismarck, Minot	
McHenry		122.581	197.275	ND 41 – Ruso, Velva	Eastern terminus
1.000 mi = 1.609 km; 1.000 km = 0.621 mi: Concurrency terminus

== Special routes ==
ND 23 has three special routes.

=== Watford City business route ===
State Route 23 Business
- Location: Watford City
- Length: 5.767 mi (9.281 km)

North Dakota Highway 23 Business (ND 23 Bus.) is a 5.767-mile-long (9.281 km) east–west state highway in the U.S. state of North Dakota. ND 23 Bus.'s western terminus is at U.S. Route 85 Business (US 85 Bus.) and ND 23 in Watford City, and the eastern terminus is at ND 23 and the southern terminus of ND 1806 in Watford City.

Major intersections
The entire route is in Watford City, McKenzie County.

mi	km	Destinations	Notes
0.000	0.000	US 85 Bus. south / ND 23	Western terminus; western end of US 85 Bus. concurrency
1.931	3.108	ND 23A east	Western terminus of ND 23A
2.152	3.463	US 85 Bus. north / Lewis and Clark Trail	Eastern end of US 85 Bus. concurrency
3.502	5.636	ND 23A west	Eastern terminus of ND 23A
5.505	8.859	ND 1806 north / Lewis and Clark Trail	Western end of ND 1806 concurrency
5.767	9.281	ND 23 / ND 1806 north	Eastern terminus; eastern end of ND 1806 concurrency; southern terminus of ND 1806
1.000 mi = 1.609 km; 1.000 km = 0.621 mi: Concurrency terminus

=== Watford City alternate ===
North Dakota Highway 23A
- Location: Watford City
- Length: 1.526 mi (2.456 km)

North Dakota Highway 23A (ND 23A) is a 1.526-mile-long (2.456 km) east–west state highway in the U.S. state of North Dakota. ND 23A's western terminus is at U.S. Route 85 Business (US 85 Bus.) and ND 23 Bus. in Watford City, and the eastern terminus is at ND 23 Bus. in Watford City.

Major intersections
The entire route is in Watford City, McKenzie County.

mi	km	Destinations	Notes
0.000	0.000	US 85 Bus. / ND 23 Bus.	Western terminus
1.526	2.456	ND 23 Bus.	Eastern terminus
1.000 mi = 1.609 km; 1.000 km = 0.621 mi

=== New Town truck route ===
State Route 23B Truck
- Location: New Town
- Length: 3.183 mi (5.123 km)

North Dakota Highway 23B Truck (ND 23B Truck) is a 3.183-mile-long (5.123 km) east–west state highway in the U.S. state of North Dakota. ND 23B Truck's western terminus is at ND 1804 north of New Town, and the eastern terminus is at ND 23 east of New Town.

Major intersections
The entire route is in Mountrail County.

Location	mi	km	Destinations	Notes
	0.000	0.000	ND 1804	Western terminus
	3.183	5.123	ND 23	Eastern terminus
1.000 mi = 1.609 km; 1.000 km = 0.621 mi
