= North Dakota Highway 73 =

Highway in North Dakota

North Dakota Highway 73

Route information
- Maintained by NDDOT
- Length: 11.332 mi (18.237 km)
- Existed: c. 1975–present

Major junctions
- West end: ND 23 east of Watford City
- East end: ND 22 north of Mandaree

Location
- Country: United States
- State: North Dakota
- Counties: McKenzie

Highway system
- North Dakota State Highway System; Interstate; US; State
← ND 69	→ US 81

North Dakota Highway 73 (ND 73) is a 11.332-mile-long (18.237 km) east–west state highway in the U.S. state of North Dakota. ND 73's western terminus is at ND 23 east of Watford City, and the eastern terminus is at ND 22 north of Mandaree.

== Major intersections ==
The entire route is in McKenzie County.

Location	mi	km	Destinations	Notes
	0.000	0.000	ND 23 – New Town, Watford City	Western terminus
	11.332	18.237	ND 22 – Killdeer	Eastern terminus
1.000 mi = 1.609 km; 1.000 km = 0.621 mi
