= Mandaree, North Dakota =

Mandaree, North Dakota Adixoodagoorahareesh
- Census-designated place
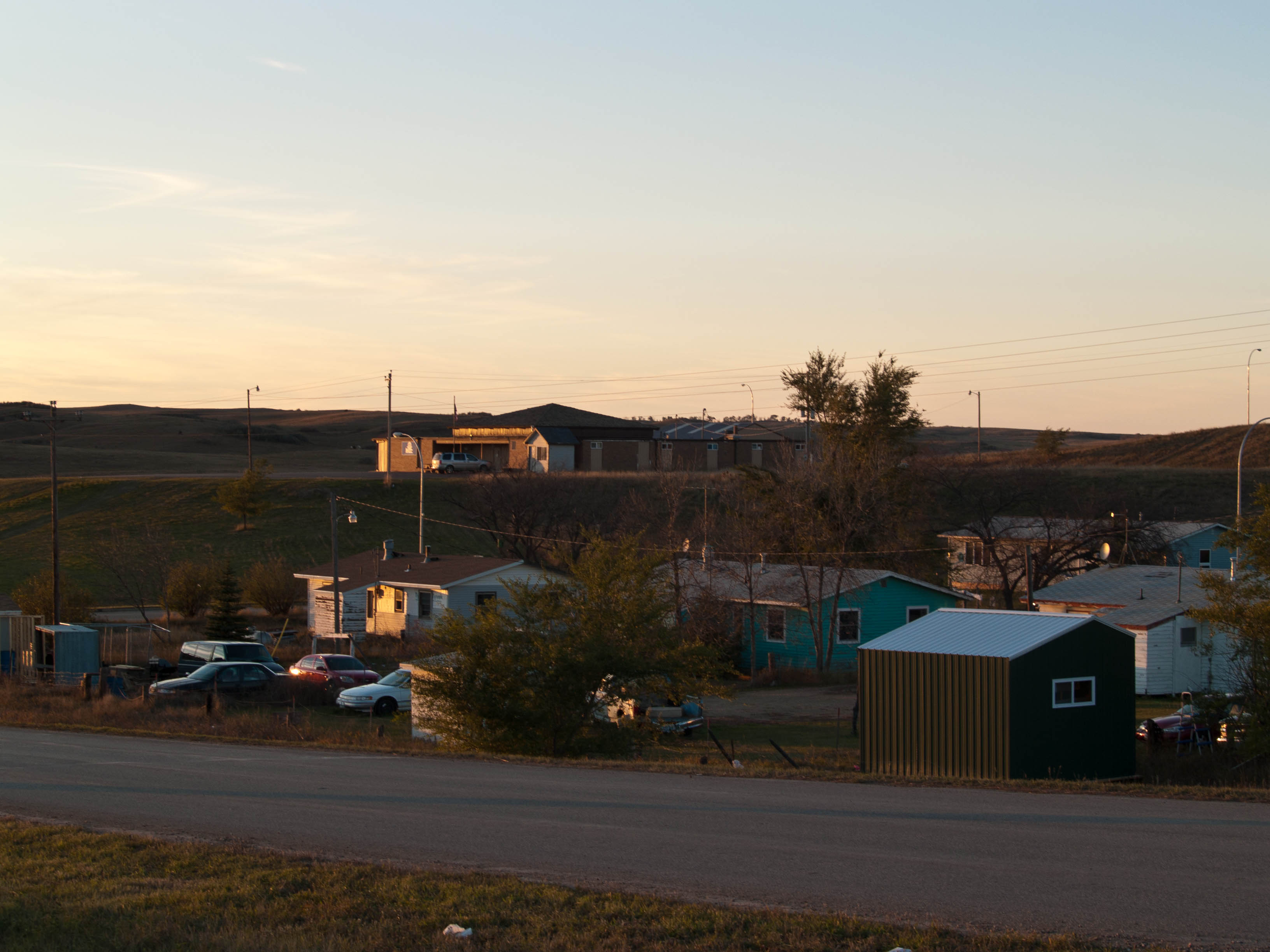
- Street in Mandaree

- Location in McKenzie County and the state of North Dakota
- Coordinates: 47°44′09″N 102°40′32″W
- Country: United States
- State: North Dakota
- County: McKenzie

Area
  - Total: 11.15 sq mi (28.87 km^{2})
  - Land: 11.14 sq mi (28.84 km^{2})
  - Water: 0.012 sq mi (0.03 km^{2})
- Elevation: 2,257 ft (688 m)

Population (2020)
  - Total: 691
  - Density: 62.1/sq mi (23.96/km^{2})
- Time zone: UTC-6 (Central (CST))
  - Summer (DST): UTC-5 (CDT)
- ZIP Code: 58757
- Area code: 701
- FIPS code: 38-49980
- GNIS feature ID: 2393116

Mandaree (Hidatsa: Adixoodagoorahareesh) is a census-designated place (CDP) in McKenzie County, North Dakota, United States. The population was 691 at the 2020 census, up from 596 in 2010.

Mandaree is located on the Fort Berthold Indian Reservation in the Mandan, Hidatsa and Arikara Nation. It was founded in 1954 as a home for those displaced by the rising backwaters of the Garrison Dam on the Missouri River. The name was suggested by a Catholic missionary on the reservation and is a portmanteau of the names of the three tribes: MANdan, HiDAtsa, and REE, another name for the Arikara.

Mandaree is the primary physical center of the Mandan-Hidatsa community. It is noted nationally for its annual Pow-wow, held the third weekend in July, as well as for being the home of the Mandaree Singers, a tribal musical group.

== Geography ==
Mandaree is in eastern McKenzie County, bordered to the east by Dunn County and to the west by North Dakota Highway 22. By road it is 30 miles (48 km) north and east to New Town, 31 miles (50 km) south to Killdeer, and 31 miles west to Watford City.

According to the U.S. Census Bureau, the Mandaree CDP has a total area of 11.1 square miles (29 km^{2}), of which 0.01 square miles (0.03 km^{2}), or 0.09% is water. Sakakawea Creek forms the southern boundary of the CDP, while Boggy Creek forms the northern boundary. Sakakawea Creek is a southeast-flowing tributary of the Little Missouri River, while Boggy Creek is a northeast-flowing direct tributary of the Missouri River.

== Demographics ==
Historical population
Census	Pop.	Note	%±
1990	367		—
2000	558		52.0%
2010	596		6.8%
2020	691		15.9%
U.S. Decennial Census

As of the census of 2000, there were 558 people, 132 households, and 119 families residing in the CDP. The population density was 50.0 inhabitants per square mile (19.3/km^{2}). There were 151 housing units at an average density of 13.5/sq mi (5.2/km^{2}). The racial makeup of the CDP was 3.05% White, 95.88% Native American, 0.18% from other races, and 0.90% from two or more races. Hispanic or Latino of any race were 1.97% of the population.

There were 132 households, out of which 59.8% had children under the age of 18 living with them, 34.1% were married couples living together, 40.9% had a female householder with no husband present, and 9.8% were non-families. 8.3% of all households were made up of individuals, and 3.0% had someone living alone who was 65 years of age or older. The average household size was 4.23 and the average family size was 4.31.

In the CDP, the population was spread out, with 48.7% under the age of 18, 9.9% from 18 to 24, 23.8% from 25 to 44, 13.1% from 45 to 64, and 4.5% who were 65 years of age or older. The median age was 18 years. For every 100 females, there were 97.2 males. For every 100 females age 18 and over, there were 88.2 males.

The median income for a household in the CDP was $24,167, and the median income for a family was $22,500. Males had a median income of $19,688 versus $17,604 for females. The per capita income for the CDP was $6,179. About 33.9% of families and 35.4% of the population were below the poverty line, including 38.9% of those under age 18 and 51.4% of those age 65 or over.

== Education ==
Mandaree Public School District #36 is made up of Mandaree Elementary School and Mandaree High School. Both schools are funded by the Bureau of Indian Education (BIE) and the state of North Dakota. The teams are called the "Mandaree Warriors" and "Lady Warriors."

The Crestwood Maagarishda Center, which includes a Head Start center, opened in 2019. The cost was $2.3 million.

== Notable people ==
- Tex G. Hall, 1998-2006 tribal chairman
- Edward Lone Fight, 1986-1990 tribal chairman
