= Sandstone School (Keene, North Dakota) =

- U.S. National Register of Historic Places
- Location within North Dakota Location within the United States
- Nearest city: 29th St., NW., McKenzie County, North Dakota, near Keene
- Coordinates: 47°50′27″N 103°19′21″W
- Area: 1 acre (0.40 ha)
- Built by: Williams, Elmer; Daily, Ed
- NRHP reference No.: 08000278
- Added to NRHP: April 11, 2008

The Sandstone School, on 29th St., NW., in McKenzie County, North Dakota, near Keene, North Dakota was listed on the National Register of Historic Places in 2008. The listing included two contributing buildings.

It achieved its 100th anniversary on June 26, 2008.

"A grass roots effort has sprung a one-room school house in McKenzie County back to life. An all-class reunion is slated for noon Thursday [June 26, 2008] to celebrate 100th anniversary of the opening Sandstone School House".

"The Sandstone School will celebrate its 100th Anniversary on Thursday, June 26th with a noon lunch at the Keene Dome in Keene, ND. There will be a short program followed by everyone traveling to the newly renovated school for cake and lemonade. Attending the program will be former teachers and students of the school. The school will receive its official certification from the US Department of Interior that lists the Sandstone School on the National Register of Historic Places for its contribution to the cultural heritage of North Dakota."
