= Killdeer Public School District =

School district in North Dakota, United States

Address
- 101 High Street NW Killdeer, North Dakota, 58640; United States

District information
- Type: Public
- Grades: PreK–12
- NCES District ID: 3810270

Students and staff
- Students: 598
- Teachers: 51.01
- Staff: 55.57
- Student–teacher ratio: 11.72

Other information
- Website: www.killdeer.k12.nd.us

Killdeer Public School District #16, also known as Killdeer Public Schools, is a school district headquartered in Killdeer, North Dakota.

Located in Dunn County, the district serves, in addition to Killdeer: Dunn Center, Halliday, Werner, and Manning.

== History ==
At one point the district had around 100 students, a low enrollment.

In 2002 the Killdeer district had 347 students. That year the district leadership considered merging the district with Halliday School District of Halliday. Halliday voters ultimately voted down the plan. Therefore, parents of 39 children residents in Halliday requested permission to send their children to Killdeer. As North Dakota districts allowed districts to restrict how many children are sent by parents to public schools outside of their districts, a group of parents attempted to persuade the North Dakota Legislature in changing the laws governing how many students may attend schools outside of their school districts. The administration of Halliday schools did not interfere with them withdrawing their children even though the parents did not succeed in having the law concerning children attending out of district changed. Additionally, the Grassy Butte district closed and sent its students to Killdeer. In Fall 2003 the Killdeer district had around 400 students, a 10% increase from the previous year.

In the 2009–2010 school year, 40 students residing in the Halliday district went to Killdeer schools while only around 20 students attended Halliday schools. The Halliday schools eventually closed.

In 2014 enrollment was at 450 with lower grade classes having the largest growth. That year the school unveiled a modular classroom to get overflow. The library and wrestling room held classes before the addition of the modular classroom.

== Transportation ==
After the Grassy Butte merger and exodus from Halliday, the district did not get an increase in its transportation budget, but to do bus services to Grassy Butte it purchased a school bus for $50,000.
