= Sandstone School =

Sandstone School may refer to:

- Sandstone School (Sandstone, Minnesota), listed on the National Register of Historic Places in Pine County, Minnesota
- Sandstone School (Keene, North Dakota), listed on the National Register of Historic Places in McKenzie County, North Dakota
