= Central McKenzie, North Dakota =

Township in North Dakota, United States

- Unorganized territory
- Location within the state of North Dakota
- Coordinates: 47°41′54″N 103°12′14″W
- Country: United States
- State: North Dakota
- County: McKenzie County

Area
  - Total: 417.38 sq mi (1,081.01 km^{2})
  - Land: 416.10 sq mi (1,077.69 km^{2})
  - Water: 1.28 sq mi (3.32 km^{2})
- Elevation: 2,290 ft (700 m)

Population (2010)
  - Total: 717
  - Density: 1.72/sq mi (0.665/km^{2})
- Time zone: UTC-7 (Mountain (CST))
  - Summer (DST): UTC-6 (MDT)
- Area code: 701
- GNIS feature ID: 1035964

Central McKenzie is an unorganized territory in McKenzie County, North Dakota, United States. The population was 717 at the 2010 census.

== Geography ==
According to the United States Census Bureau, the unorganized territory has a total area of 417.38 square miles (1,081.01 km^{2}), of which 416.10 square miles (1,077.69 km^{2}) is land and 1.28 square miles (3.32 km^{2}), or 0.31%, is water.
