= Dunn Center, North Dakota =

- City
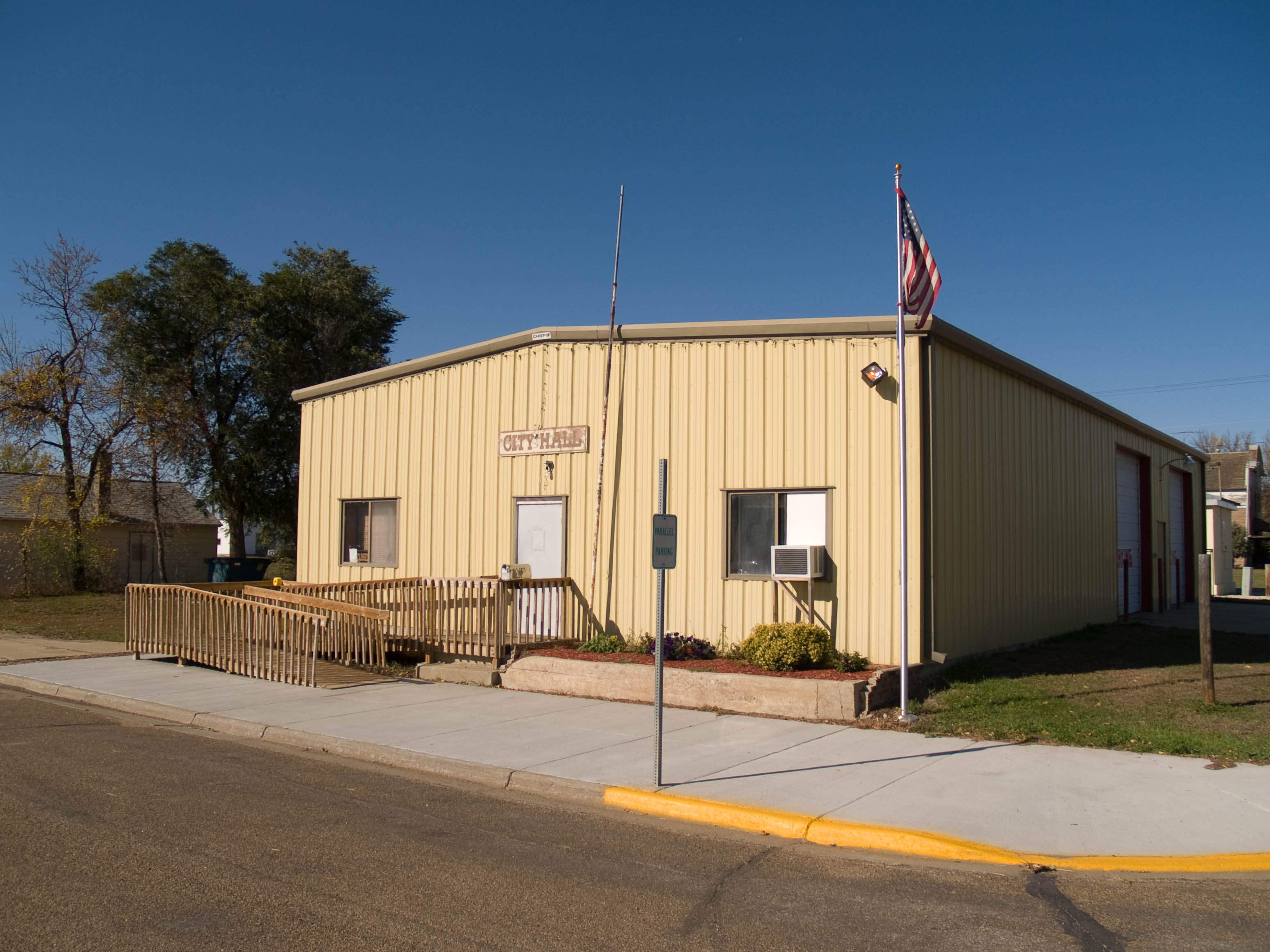
- Dunn Center City Hall

- Logo

- Location of Dunn Center, North Dakota
- Coordinates: 47°21′10″N 102°37′24″W
- Country: United States
- State: North Dakota
- County: Dunn
- Founded: 1914

Area
  - Total: 0.39 sq mi (1.02 km^{2})
  - Land: 0.39 sq mi (1.01 km^{2})
  - Water: 0 sq mi (0.00 km^{2})
- Elevation: 2,175 ft (663 m)

Population (2020)
  - Total: 227
  - Estimate (2022): 229
  - Density: 580.7/sq mi (224.21/km^{2})
- Time zone: UTC-7 (Mountain (MST))
  - Summer (DST): UTC-6 (MDT)
- ZIP code: 58626
- Area code: 701
- FIPS code: 38-20940
- GNIS feature ID: 1035999
- Website: cityofdunncenter.com

Dunn Center is a city in Dunn County, North Dakota, United States. The population was 227 at the 2020 census. Dunn Center was founded in 1914.

== History ==
Dunn Center was laid out in 1914, when the railroad was extended to that point. The city was so named on account of its central location in Dunn County.

== Geography ==
According to the United States Census Bureau, the city has a total area of 0.39 square miles (1.01 km^{2}), all land.

Dunn Center is located on North Dakota Highway 200, east of Lake Ilo.

== Demographics ==
Historical population
Census	Pop.	Note	%±
1920	247		—
1930	276		11.7%
1940	238		−13.8%
1950	246		3.4%
1960	250		1.6%
1970	107		−57.2%
1980	170		58.9%
1990	128		−24.7%
2000	122		−4.7%
2010	146		19.7%
2020	227		55.5%
2022 (est.)	229		0.9%
U.S. Decennial Census; 2020 Census

=== 2010 census ===
As of the census of 2010, there were 146 people in 66 households, including 38 families, in the city. The population density was 374.4 inhabitants per square mile (144.6/km^{2}). There were 80 housing units at an average density of 205.1 per square mile (79.2/km^{2}). The racial makup of the city was 93.8% White, 1.4% Native American, 0.7% from other races, and 4.1% from two or more races. Hispanic or Latino of any race were 1.4%.

Of the 66 households, 27.3% had children under the age of 18 living with them, 48.5% were married couples living together, 6.1% had a female householder with no husband present, 3.0% had a male householder with no wife present, and 42.4% were non-families. 33.3% of households were one person and 19.7% were one person aged 65 or older. The average household size was 2.21 and the average family size was 2.82.

The median age was 39.2 years. 21.9% of residents were under the age of 18; 8.2% were between the ages of 18 and 24; 27.4% were from 25 to 44; 23.9% were from 45 to 64; and 18.5% were 65 or older. The gender makeup of the city was 51.4% male and 48.6% female.

=== 2000 census ===
As of the census of 2000, there were 122 people in 58 households, including 33 families, in the city. The population density was 304.5 inhabitants per square mile (117.6/km^{2}). There were 81 housing units at an average density of 202.2 per square mile (78.1/km^{2}). The racial makup of the city was 90.98% White, 6.56% Native American, and 2.46% from two or more races.

Of the 58 households, 15.5% had children under the age of 18 living with them, 50.0% were married couples living together, 3.4% had a female householder with no husband present, and 43.1% were non-families. 36.2% of households were one person and 20.7% were one person aged 65 or older. The average household size was 2.10 and the average family size was 2.67.

The age distribution was 16.4% under the age of 18, 4.9% from 18 to 24, 23.0% from 25 to 44, 32.8% from 45 to 64, and 23.0% 65 or older. The median age was 49 years. For every 100 females, there were 90.6 males. For every 100 females age 18 and over, there were 92.5 males.

The median household income was $23,500 and the median family income was $27,500. Males had a median income of $18,750 versus $16,071 for females. The per capita income for the city was $13,736. There were 8.3% of families and 9.6% of the population living below the poverty line, including no under eighteens and 3.1% of those over 64.

== Climate ==
This climatic region is typified by large seasonal temperature differences, with warm to hot (and often humid) summers and cold (sometimes severely cold) winters. According to the Köppen Climate Classification system, Dunn Center has a humid continental climate, abbreviated "Dfb" on climate maps.

Climate data for Dunn Center 1E, North Dakota (1991–2020 normals, extremes 1919–present)
Month	Jan	Feb	Mar	Apr	May	Jun	Jul	Aug	Sep	Oct	Nov	Dec	Year
Record high °F (°C)	62 (17)	65 (18)	80 (27)	96 (36)	100 (38)	108 (42)	111 (44)	110 (43)	107 (42)	98 (37)	77 (25)	64 (18)	111 (44)
Mean maximum °F (°C)	46.8 (8.2)	50.1 (10.1)	64.9 (18.3)	77.8 (25.4)	85.7 (29.8)	90.9 (32.7)	95.7 (35.4)	99.0 (37.2)	93.1 (33.9)	81.6 (27.6)	62.8 (17.1)	49.5 (9.7)	100.4 (38.0)
Mean daily maximum °F (°C)	24.4 (−4.2)	28.6 (−1.9)	41.0 (5.0)	55.1 (12.8)	66.4 (19.1)	75.6 (24.2)	83.5 (28.6)	84.2 (29.0)	73.1 (22.8)	56.4 (13.6)	40.2 (4.6)	27.6 (−2.4)	54.7 (12.6)
Daily mean °F (°C)	12.3 (−10.9)	16.2 (−8.8)	28.2 (−2.1)	41.5 (5.3)	53.1 (11.7)	62.7 (17.1)	68.6 (20.3)	68.3 (20.2)	58.0 (14.4)	43.0 (6.1)	27.9 (−2.3)	16.6 (−8.6)	41.4 (5.2)
Mean daily minimum °F (°C)	0.2 (−17.7)	3.8 (−15.7)	15.4 (−9.2)	28.0 (−2.2)	39.8 (4.3)	49.7 (9.8)	53.7 (12.1)	52.3 (11.3)	42.9 (6.1)	29.5 (−1.4)	15.7 (−9.1)	5.7 (−14.6)	28.1 (−2.2)
Mean minimum °F (°C)	−25.0 (−31.7)	−15.8 (−26.6)	−8.3 (−22.4)	11.6 (−11.3)	25.4 (−3.7)	38.1 (3.4)	41.9 (5.5)	40.6 (4.8)	27.9 (−2.3)	13.6 (−10.2)	−3.7 (−19.8)	−18.7 (−28.2)	−28.0 (−33.3)
Record low °F (°C)	−46 (−43)	−52 (−47)	−35 (−37)	−14 (−26)	12 (−11)	22 (−6)	33 (1)	29 (−2)	14 (−10)	−14 (−26)	−23 (−31)	−38 (−39)	−52 (−47)
Average precipitation inches (mm)	0.36 (9.1)	0.36 (9.1)	0.73 (19)	1.36 (35)	2.62 (67)	3.25 (83)	2.46 (62)	1.84 (47)	1.72 (44)	1.17 (30)	0.55 (14)	0.41 (10)	16.83 (427)
Average snowfall inches (cm)	7.0 (18)	5.4 (14)	6.8 (17)	4.6 (12)	0.5 (1.3)	0.0 (0.0)	0.0 (0.0)	0.0 (0.0)	0.1 (0.25)	2.1 (5.3)	6.7 (17)	5.4 (14)	38.6 (98.85)
Average precipitation days (≥ 0.01 in)	5.1	4.6	5.7	6.4	8.7	10.4	8.0	6.8	5.7	5.3	4.9	5.1	76.7
Average snowy days (≥ 0.1 in)	4.6	3.8	4.2	1.8	0.4	0.0	0.0	0.0	0.1	0.9	3.6	5.0	24.4
Source: NOAA (precip days, snow/snow days 1981–2010)

== Education ==
It is zoned to the Killdeer School District.
