= Cartwright, North Dakota =

- Unincorporated community
- Location within North Dakota Location within the United States
- Coordinates: 47°51′35″N 103°55′35″W
- Country: United States
- State: North Dakota
- County: McKenzie
- Elevation: 1,910 ft (580 m)
- Time zone: UTC-6 (Central (CST))
  - Summer (DST): UTC-5 (CDT)
- ZIP codes: 58838
- Area code: 701
- GNIS feature ID: 1034764

Cartwright is an unincorporated community in northwestern McKenzie County, North Dakota, United States. The community is named for Samuel George Cartwright, a rancher, trapper, and hunter who was the first settler in the area. Cartwright lies along North Dakota Highway 200, west of the city of Watford City, the county seat of McKenzie County.

== History ==
The population was 50 in 1940.

== Climate ==
According to the Köppen Climate Classification system, Cartwright has a semi-arid climate, abbreviated "BSk" on climate maps.
