= Halliday, North Dakota =

- City
- Location of Halliday, North Dakota
- Coordinates: 47°21′08″N 102°20′19″W
- Country: United States
- State: North Dakota
- County: Dunn
- Founded: 1914

Area
  - Total: 0.47 sq mi (1.21 km^{2})
  - Land: 0.46 sq mi (1.19 km^{2})
  - Water: 0.0039 sq mi (0.01 km^{2})
- Elevation: 2,070 ft (631 m)

Population (2020)
  - Total: 241
  - Estimate (2022): 229
  - Density: 522.3/sq mi (201.68/km^{2})
- Time zone: UTC-7 (Mountain (MST))
  - Summer (DST): UTC-6 (MDT)
- ZIP code: 58636
- Area code: 701
- FIPS code: 38-34340
- GNIS feature ID: 1036072
- Website: cityofhalliday.com

Halliday is a city in Dunn County, North Dakota, United States. The population was 241 at the 2020 census.

John S. Lesmeister, who served as the 30th North Dakota State Treasurer, grew up in Halliday.

== History ==
Halliday was founded in 1914.

Halliday was originally two miles farther north. It moved in 1914 to be near the new Mandan to Killdeer railroad line. In 1900, the first post office was located on William Halliday's place.

Two events drastically altered the economic life of the city for the worst; the first was the Great Depression of 1929, and the second was the abandonment of the rail line from Zap to Killdeer. Unlike other locals communities, such as the nearby city of Werner, the city persisted and continued to function despite the economic setback due to its strategic location.

== Geography ==
According to the United States Census Bureau, the city has a total area of 0.47 square miles (1.22 km^{2}), of which 0.46 square miles (1.19 km^{2}) is land and 0.01 square miles (0.03 km^{2}) is water.

== Demographics ==
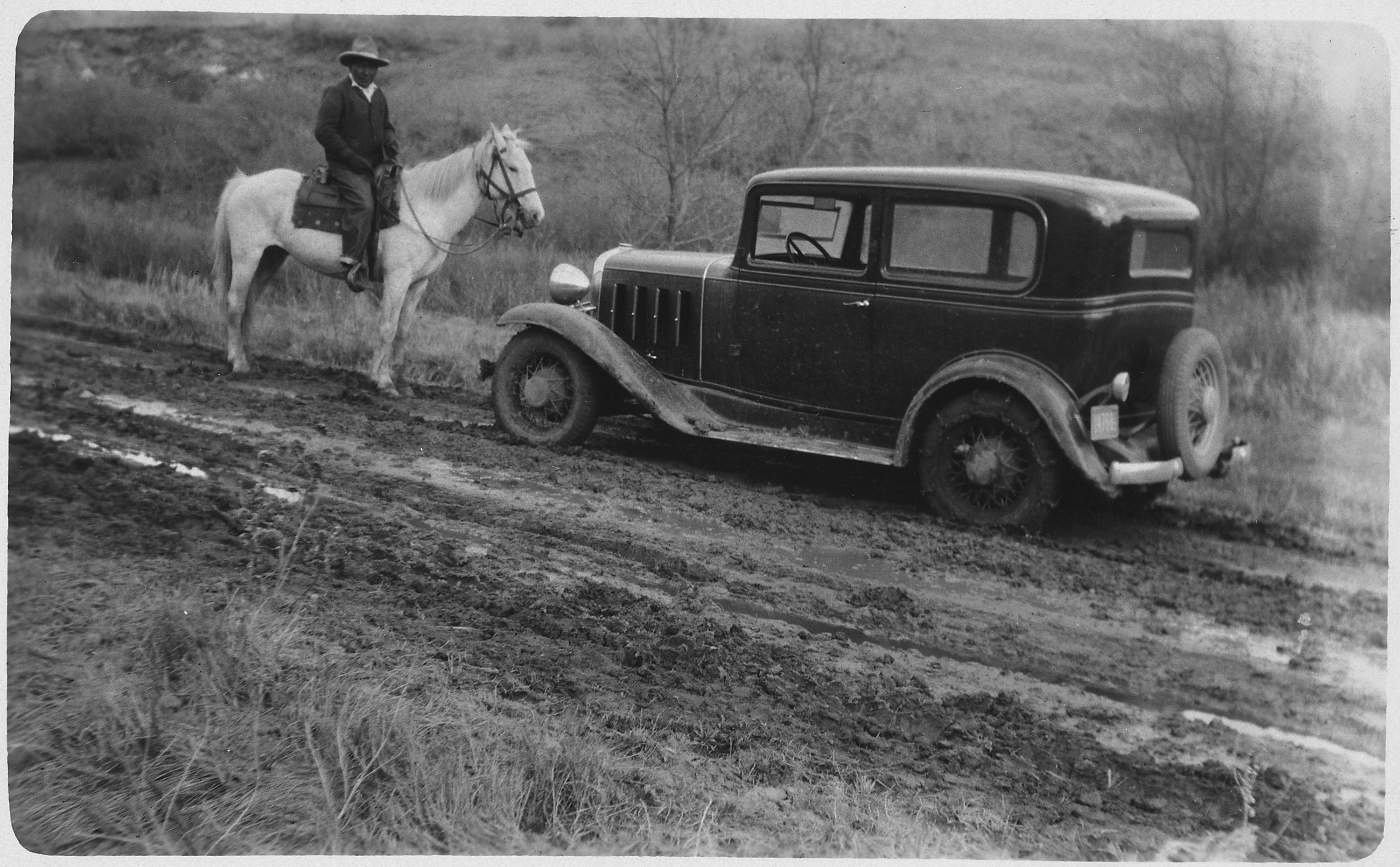
Car meets horse near Halliday, North Dakota (1933)

Historical population
Census	Pop.	Note	%±
1920	289		—
1930	305		5.5%
1940	395		29.5%
1950	477		20.8%
1960	509		6.7%
1970	413		−18.9%
1980	355		−14.0%
1990	288		−18.9%
2000	227		−21.2%
2010	188		−17.2%
2020	241		28.2%
2022 (est.)	229		−5.0%
U.S. Decennial Census; 2020 Census

=== 2010 census ===
As of the census of 2010, there were 188 people, 93 households, and 52 families residing in the city. The population density was 408.7 inhabitants per square mile (157.8/km^{2}). There were 135 housing units at an average density of 293.5 per square mile (113.3/km^{2}). The racial makeup of the city was 90.4% White, 0.5% African American, 5.9% Native American, 1.6% Asian, and 1.6% from two or more races. Hispanic or Latino of any race were 0.5% of the population.

There were 93 households, of which 21.5% had children under the age of 18 living with them, 47.3% were married couples living together, 4.3% had a female householder with no husband present, 4.3% had a male householder with no wife present, and 44.1% were non-families. 43.0% of all households were made up of individuals, and 29% had someone living alone who was 65 years of age or older. The average household size was 2.02 and the average family size was 2.77.

The median age in the city was 53.2 years. 20.7% of residents were under the age of 18; 7% were between the ages of 18 and 24; 16% were from 25 to 44; 25.5% were from 45 to 64; and 30.9% were 65 years of age or older. The gender makeup of the city was 54.3% male and 45.7% female.

=== 2000 census ===
As of the census of 2000, there were 227 people, 117 households, and 62 families residing in the city. The population density was 489.6 inhabitants per square mile (189.0/km^{2}). There were 155 housing units at an average density of 334.3 per square mile (129.1/km^{2}). The racial makeup of the city was 92.51% White, 6.17% Native American, and 1.32% from two or more races. Hispanic or Latino of any race were 2.20% of the population.

There were 117 households, out of which 16.2% had children under the age of 18 living with them, 47.0% were married couples living together, 5.1% had a female householder with no husband present, and 47.0% were non-families. 41.9% of all households were made up of individuals, and 17.9% had someone living alone who was 65 years of age or older. The average household size was 1.94 and the average family size was 2.65.

In the city, the population was spread out, with 17.6% under the age of 18, 4.0% from 18 to 24, 16.7% from 25 to 44, 27.3% from 45 to 64, and 34.4% who were 65 years of age or older. The median age was 54 years. For every 100 females, there were 100.9 males. For every 100 females age 18 and over, there were 117.4 males.

The median income for a household in the city was $21,500, and the median income for a family was $31,500. Males had a median income of $30,000 versus $21,250 for females. The per capita income for the city was $18,371. None of the families and 8.8% of the population were living below the poverty line, including no under eighteens and 15.6% of those over 64.

== Education ==
The local school is Halliday Public School District.

== Climate ==
This climatic region is typified by large seasonal temperature differences, with warm to hot (and often humid) summers and cold (sometimes severely cold) winters. According to the Köppen Climate Classification system, Halliday has a humid continental climate, abbreviated "Dfb" on climate maps.
