= Four Bears Bridge =

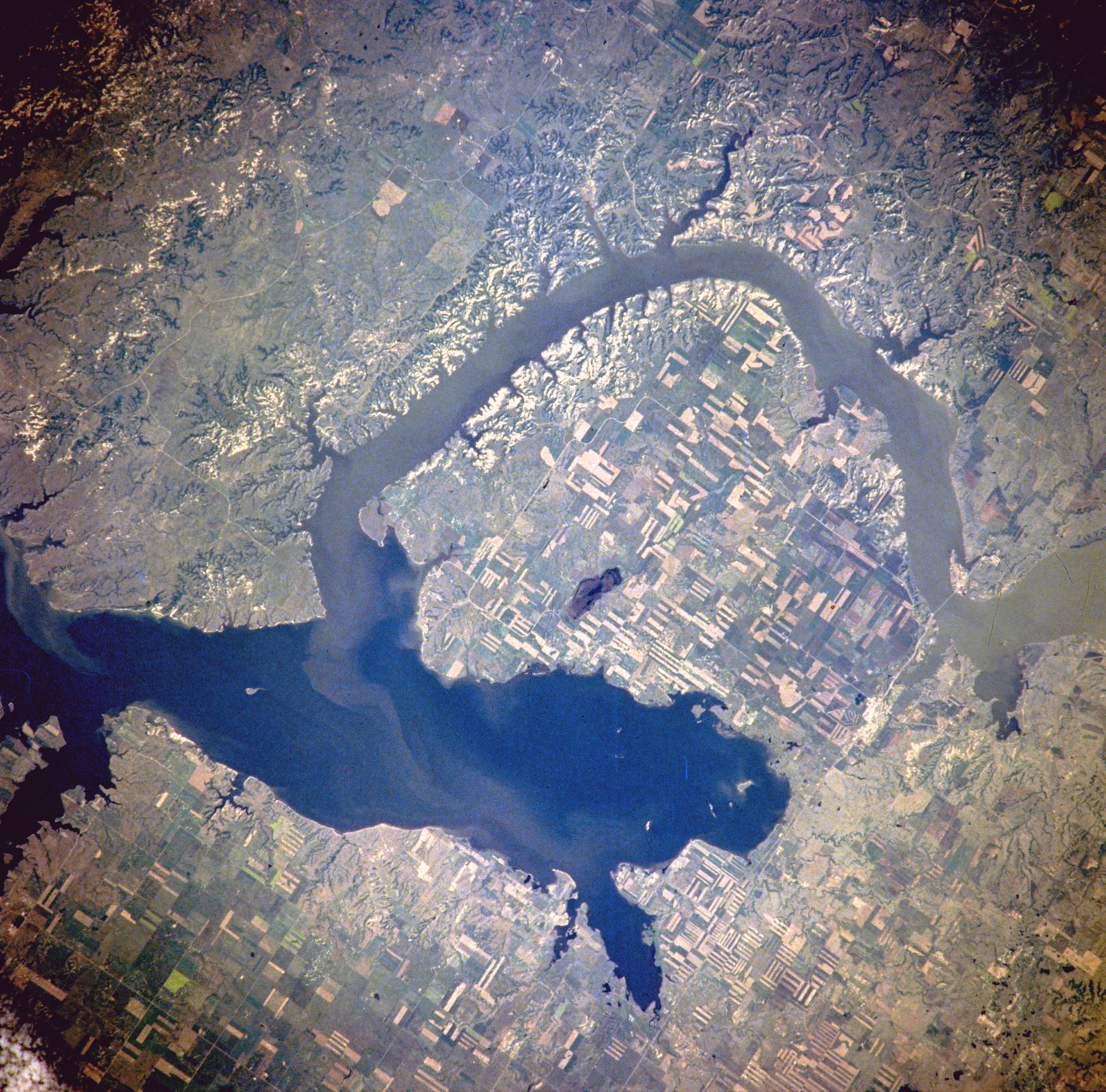
- Four Bears Bridge seen by satellite in 1996
- Coordinates: 47°58′47″N 102°33′43″W
- Crosses: Lake Sakakawea

Characteristics
- Longest span: 316 feet (96 m)

History
- Construction start: July 2003
- Construction end: 2005
- Construction cost: $55,000,000

Location
- Interactive map of Four Bears Bridge

Four Bears Bridge is one of two bridges built over the Missouri River on the Fort Berthold Reservation in the U.S. state of North Dakota. It carries North Dakota Highway 23. The current bridge which opened in 2005 is the second largest bridge in the state and replaced an earlier bridge built in 1934. The 1934 bridge was moved in 1955 following the construction of the Garrison Dam and the creation of Lake Sakakawea.

One worker was killed and three were injured when a portion of the new bridge collapsed during construction on November 30, 2004.

The current bridge is decorated with medallions reflecting the heritage of the Three Affiliated Tribes, the Mandan, Arikara and Hidatsa, who inhabit the reservation. The bridge is named for two chiefs, one Mandan and one Hidatsa and both named Four Bears.

The bridge opened to traffic on September 2, 2005, at around 10:00 a.m. local time . An official opening ceremony was held on October 3, 2005.

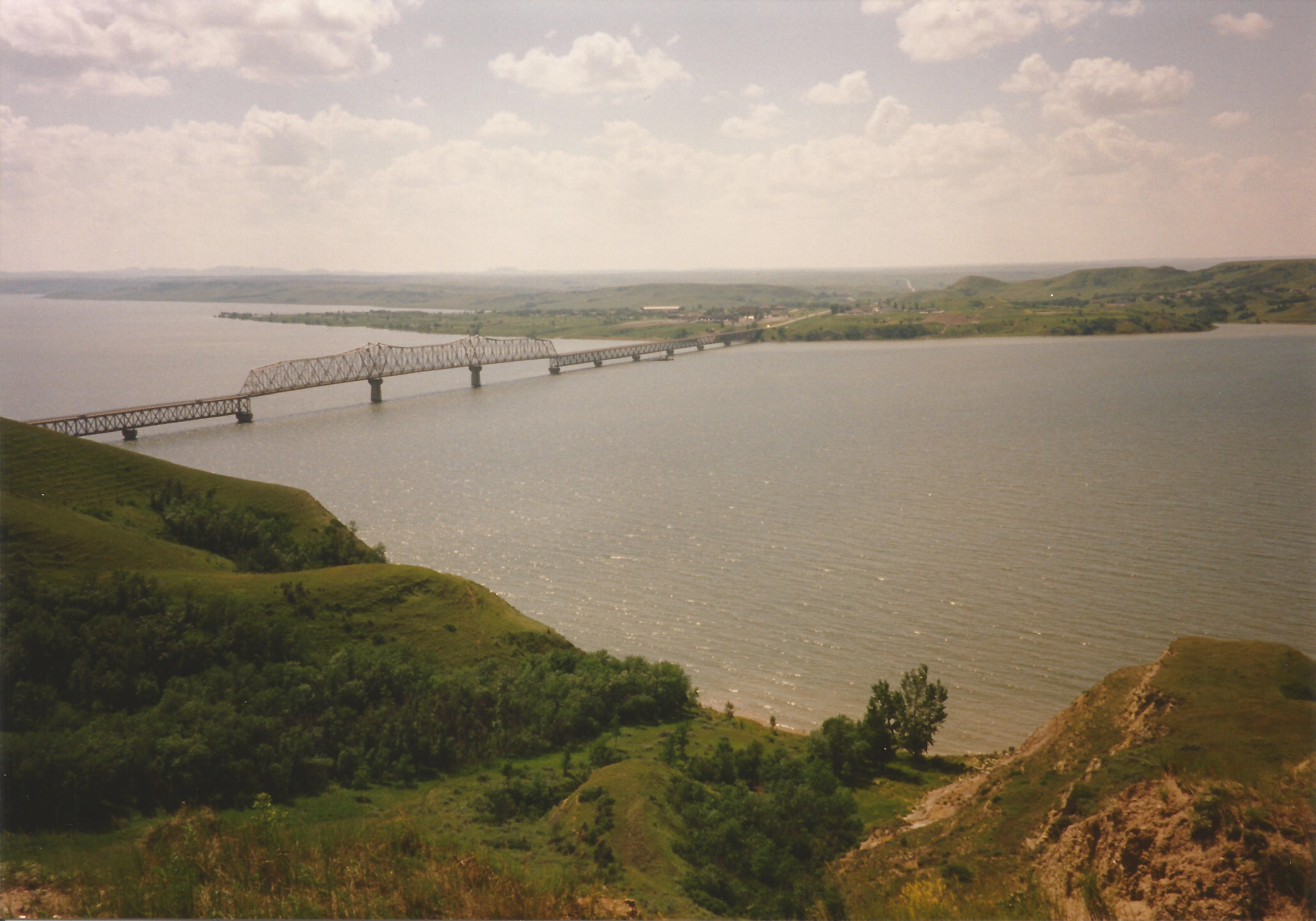
The old bridge from the Four Bears Village side
