= Rawson, North Dakota =

- Unincorporated community
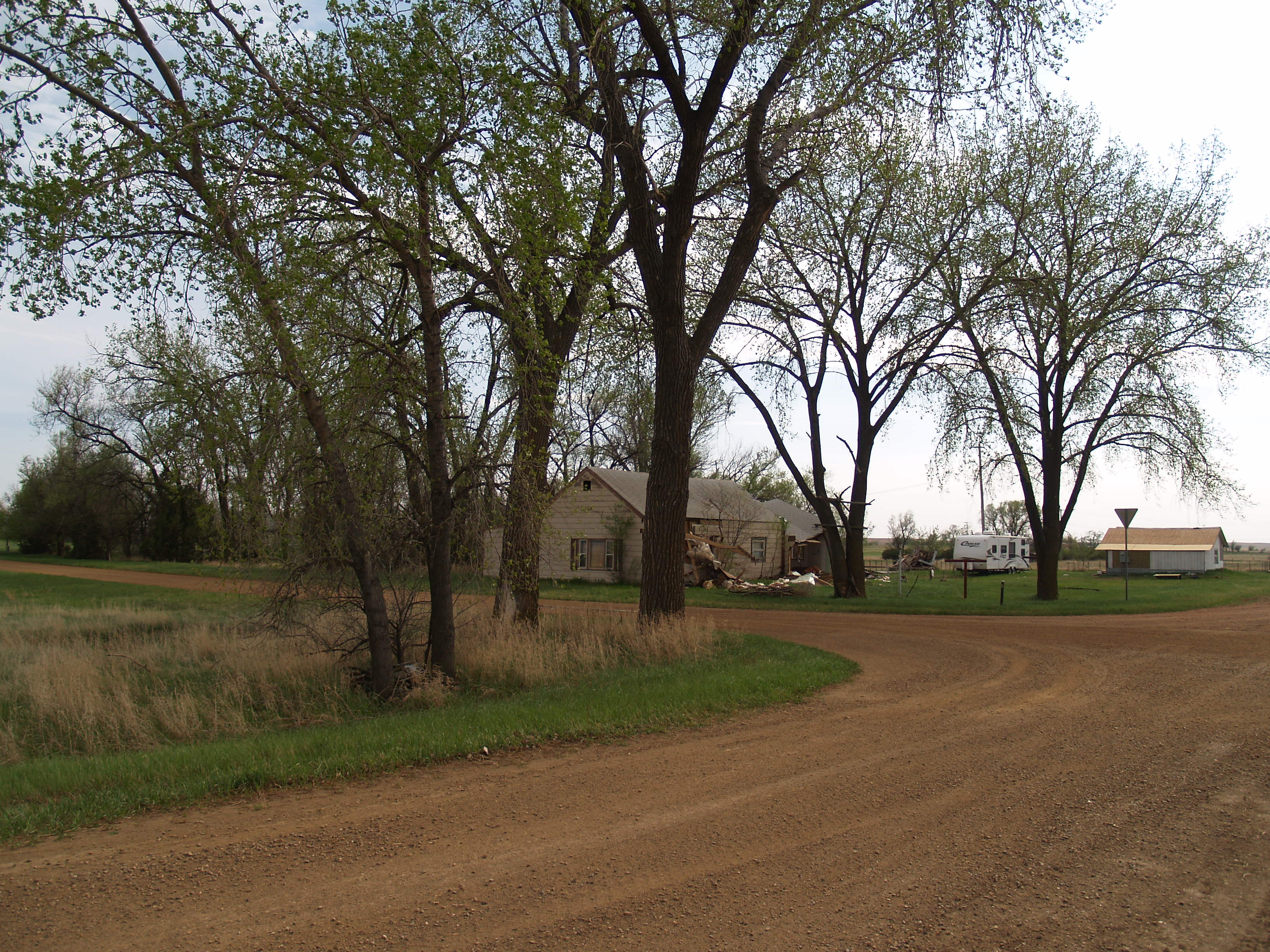
- Street in Rawson

- Location within North Dakota Location within the United States
- Coordinates: 47°49′12″N 103°32′28″W
- Country: United States
- State: North Dakota
- County: McKenzie

Area
  - Total: 0.23 sq mi (0.6 km^{2})
  - Land: 0.23 sq mi (0.6 km^{2})
  - Water: 0 sq mi (0.0 km^{2})
- Elevation: 2,257 ft (688 m)

Population (2000)
  - Total: 6
  - Density: 24/sq mi (9.4/km^{2})
- ZIP code: 58831
- Area code: 701
- FIPS code: 38-65500
- GNIS feature ID: 1036230

Rawson is a now-unincorporated farm community in McKenzie County, North Dakota, United States. It has two streets: Main Street, one mile north of the combined state highways 85 and 200, at Main's intersection with First Avenue. The population was 6 at the 2000 census. Rawson was founded in 1913 and incorporated, and attained the status of a small rural town. The government of Rawson was dissolved in 2002, mail was then sent to Alexander.

== Geography ==
According to the United States Census Bureau, the city has a total area of 0.2 square miles (0.52 km^{2}), all land. The land is fertile and flat, and used for farming.

== Demographics ==
Historical population
Census	Pop.	Note	%±
1930	65		—
1940	72		10.8%
1950	32		−55.6%
1960	28		−12.5%
1970	10		−64.3%
1980	12		20.0%
1990	9		−25.0%
2000	6		−33.3%
U.S. Decennial Census

As of the census of 2000, there were 6 people, 2 households, and 2 families residing in the city. The population density was 24.5 people per square mile (9.3/km^{2}). There were 7 housing units at an average density of 28.5 per square mile (11.0/km^{2}). The racial makeup of the city was 100.00% White.

There were 2 households, out of which 50.0% had children under the age of 18 living with them, and 100.0% were married couples living together. The average household size was 3.00 and the average family size was 3.00.

In the city the population was spread out, with 33.3% under the age of 18, 33.3% from 25 to 44, 33.3% from 45 to 64. The median age was 42 years. For every 100 females, there were 50 males. For every 100 females age 18 and over, there were 100 males.

The median income for a household in the city was $16,250, and the median income for a family was $16,250. Males had a median income of $0 versus $0 for females. The per capita income for the city was $5,467. None of the population and none of the families were below the poverty line. Farming is the sole occupation of the population; there are no other businesses or services.
