= Homesteaders Gap =

Unincorporated village in North Dakota, U.S.

Homesteaders Gap, North Dakota
- Interactive map of Homesteaders Gap, North Dakota
- Coordinates: 47°29′20″N 103°55′39″W
- Country: United States of America
- State: North Dakota
- County: McKenzie County
- Elevation: 2,274 ft (693 m)
- Time zone: UTC-7 (Mountain)
  - Summer (DST): UTC-6
- ZIP: 59270
- Area codes: +1 701 (ND) and +1 406 (MT)
- GNIS feature ID: 1035183

Homesteaders Gap (formerly Squaw Gap) is a tiny hamlet on North Dakota Highway 16 in McKenzie County, extending across the Montana border as West Squaw Gap.

The unincorporated village includes a school and a community center (the Squaw Gap Multipurpose Center).

The McKenzie County school, which had been operating since 1904, had two students in 2006. It is now closed; local students attend Rau School in Sidney, Montana. Squaw Gap School, when it was functioning, served kindergarten through sixth grade. A trailer on the school property used to house the lone schoolmaster, but has since been occupied by a local woman.

A local independent telephone exchange was inaugurated on December 15, 1971, with an NBC broadcast of a first phone call from Squaw Gap to U.S. Secretary of Agriculture Earl Butz in Washington, D.C. The community was one of the last to obtain landline telephone service in the continental United States. (Iowa Hill, California, lost its service in the 1960s, but regained it in 2010.)

In January 2023, the United States Department of the Interior announced that Homesteaders Gap, along with six other locations, had been renamed due to the former name containing an ethnic, racial and sexist slur. The new name was chosen by the government, and is relevant to local history.
