= Lake Ilo National Wildlife Refuge =

Wildlife refuge

- IUCN category IV (habitat/species management area)
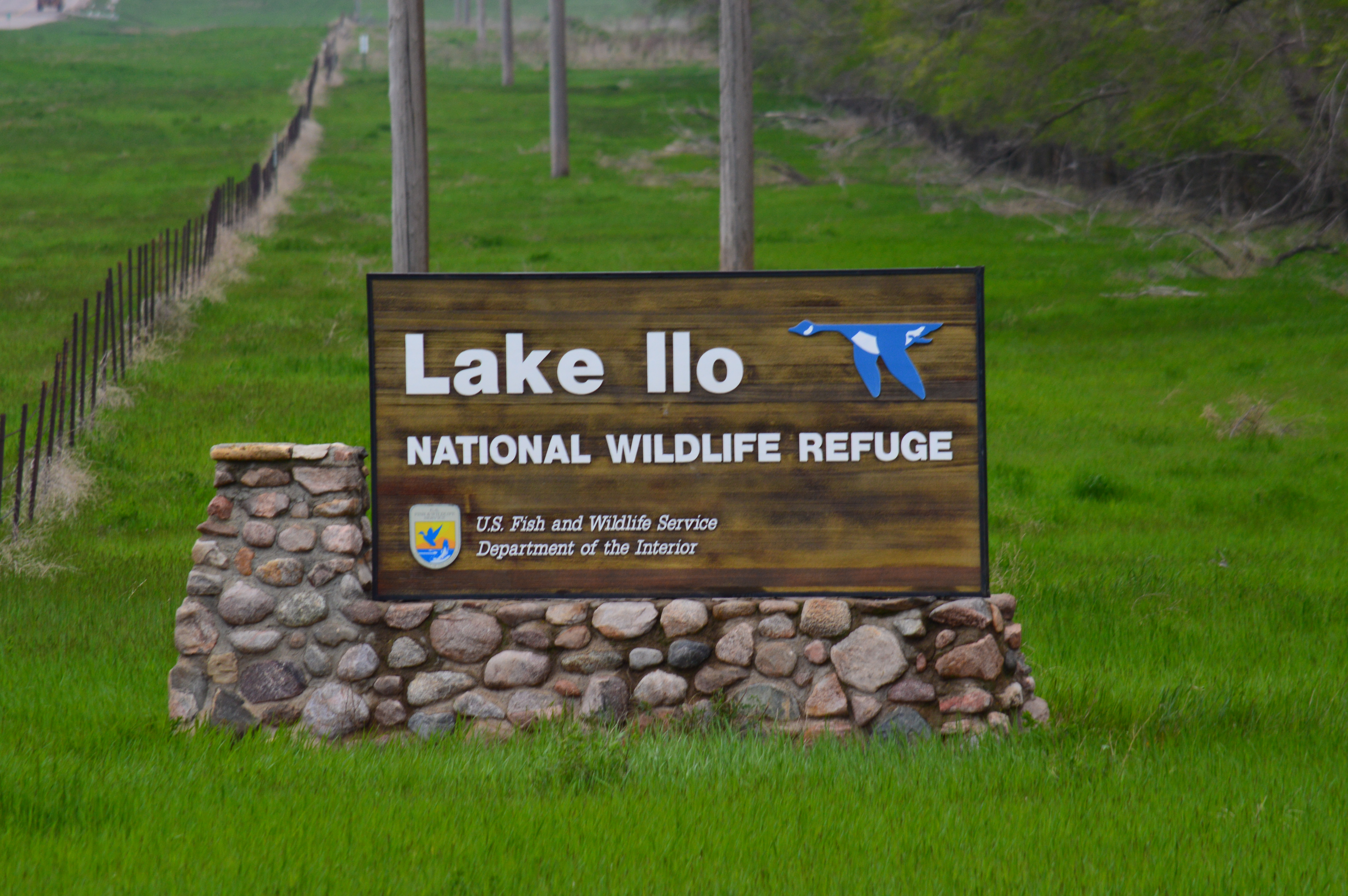

- Location within the United States
- Location: Dunn County, North Dakota, USA
- Nearest city: Dunn Center, ND
- Coordinates: 47°20′11″N 102°41′17″W
- Area: 4,034 acres (16 km^{2})
- Established: 1939
- Governing body: U.S. Fish and Wildlife Service
- Website: Lake Ilo National Wildlife Refuge

Lake Ilo National Wildlife Refuge (NWR) is located in the U.S. state of North Dakota and is managed from Audubon National Wildlife Refuge by the U.S. Fish and Wildlife Service. The refuge consists of Lake Ilo, surrounding wetlands and some upland range, providing habitat for hundreds of species of birds, and numerous fish and mammal species. An average of over 16 inches (40 cm) of precipitation falls annually, supporting a prairie ecosystem.

Archeological work at Lake Ilo NWR in the 1990s resulted in creating one of the largest assemblages of Paleo Indian artifacts found on land managed by the U.S. Fish and Wildlife Service. These artifacts help to educate modern peoples about those who lived in the region more than 10,000 years ago, and enhances the refuge with a human culture story that was not anticipated when the region was set aside for wildlife protection.

== History ==
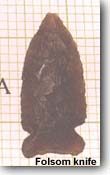
Arrow point made of Knife River Flint found on the refuge

The refuge region has been inhabited by humans for 11,000 years, and 58,000 stone artifacts from the Folsom period have been recovered from the refuge since 1989. Many of the stone tools are made from what is known as Knife River Flint, a sturdy but relatively easily worked stone from which Paleo Indians fabricated spear points, meat cleavers and other implements. Western North Dakota has the only large concentrations of this glass-like caramel-colored stone, and similar stone tools made from these deposits have been found as far away as the states of New York and New Mexico.

The region in which Lake Ilo NWR is located was one of the last to be settled by white settlers on the Great Plains of the United States. By the 1930s, the era of the Dust Bowl brought drought and dust storms to an already arid region. Starting in 1936, local citizens were hired by the U.S. Government to build a dam at the confluence of two creeks, which would help create a more sustainable water supply for the immediate area since no sizeable bodies of water existed in this region of North Dakota. The dam was completed in 1938 and the following year, U.S. President Franklin D. Roosevelt signed a congressional bill designating the new lake and the surrounding area as a National Wildlife Refuge.

In the late 1980s, the dam on Lake Ilo was determined to be deficient in a number of ways and the lake was drained in 1989 a total of 7 feet (2 m). A new concrete dam was constructed and soil from the old dam was used to build two small islands to improve nesting habitat for waterfowl. After the lake water was partially drained, numerous Paleo Indian artifacts were discovered, including stone artifacts and even a Tipi ring. Subsequent archeological work resulted in obtaining over 58,000 artifacts by 1994. These artifacts help to reconstruct the lifestyle and culture of the earliest known human inhabitants to the region. Additionally, numerous bones of now extinct mammal species assist in determining the biodiversity of the region at the end of the ice age.

== Ecosystem ==
=== Habitat ===
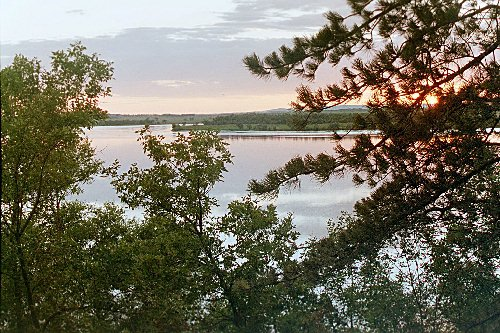
Lake Ilo

Lake Ilo NWR consists of 2,650 acres (11 km^{2}) grassland prairie and the 1,240-acre (5 km^{2}) Lake Ilo, which is a man-made lake. The prairie ecosystem of the region receives only 16.8 inches (42 cm) of precipitation annually so the lake provides nesting habitat and a sustainable water supply for hundreds of migratory waterfowl and other birds. In addition to the lake, over two dozen smaller wetlands are located in the refuge. The natural habitat of the region is Short grass prairie, which is similar to the steppe of Asia, but since it receives a little more moisture, it has more trees. Since the creation of the lake in the 1930s, Lake Ilo NWR now has a more expansive forested section, which increases nesting habitat for songbirds and smaller mammals.

Summers on the northern Great Plains of North Dakota are usually pleasant with temperatures in the 70s °F (25 °C), and nighttime lows usually dipping into the 50s (7 °C). The winters are windy and can be very cold, with temperatures as low as -56 °F (-49 °C) and an average of 2 blizzards occurring annually.

=== Biology ===
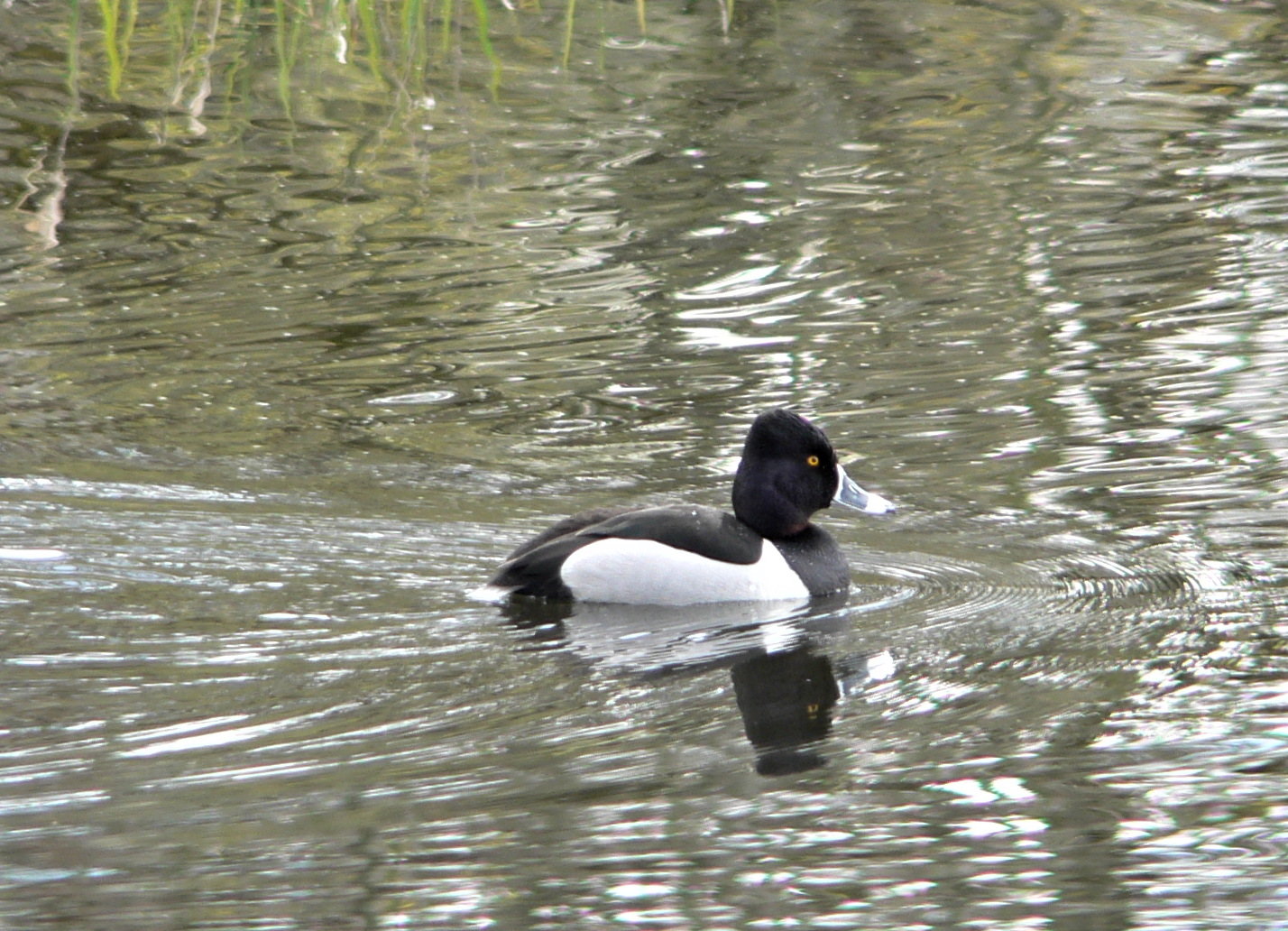
Ring-necked duck is but one of over a hundred species of waterfowl that can be seen at the refuge.

A total of 226 species of birds have been observed at Lake Ilo NWR, including the endangered whooping crane, and the threatened bald eagle and piping plover. During fall migrations, as many as 100,000 waterfowl such as Canada geese, mallards, northern pintail, blue-winged teal, double-crested cormorant and great blue heron can be seen each year. While the vast majority of bird species are most abundant during the spring and fall migrations, some bird species can be found year-round.

Mammals such as the white-tailed deer, badger, skunk, beaver, raccoon are relatively common, while the pronghorn, mule deer and coyote are a few of the less likely to be observed of the 36 mammal species that have been recorded on the refuge. Lake Ilo NWR is also home to three species of amphibians and six species of reptiles including the tiger salamander, common snapping turtle, bull snake and the chorus frog. Northern pike, yellow perch and black crappie are examples of the 11 fish species that have been documented in the refuge.

== Recreation ==
Fishing is permitted on the lake almost year-round except for the month of April. Small motorized boats are permitted but must not operate above idle speed. Some wetland areas may be excluded from fishing during certain periods of the spring and fall to protect nesting birds. Wildlife viewing is available from a 1-mile (1.6 km) nature trail which is located on the north shore of Lake Ilo, as well as from gravel roads. Much of the wetland environment on the southwestern side of the lake is off-limits to people year round.

The refuge has several archeological displays and a reconstructed Tipi ring located at the entrance to the nature trail. At the location of the Lake Ilo dam, there is also a historical display discussing the history of the dam project on the 1930s and 1990s. Along the north shore of the lake, a boat ramp and picnic area are provided for visitors.

The refuge is located 1 mile (1.6 km) west of Dunn Center, North Dakota on Highway 200, and is only open during the daytime.

== Management ==
Lake Ilo NWR is a part of the Audubon National Wildlife Refuge Complex and is one of dozens of outlying National Wildlife Refuges which have their main headquarters at Audubon National Wildlife Refuge. A small staff maintains the refuge. Lake Ilo NWR is one of over 540 locations managed by the U.S. Fish and Wildlife Service, an agency of the U.S. Department of the Interior. The primary focus of the refuge is protection of habitat for various plant and animal species.
