= 1988 United States presidential election in North Dakota =

- November 8, 1988

Nominee	George H. W. Bush	Michael Dukakis
Party	Republican	Democratic–NPL
Home state	Texas	Massachusetts
Running mate	Dan Quayle	Lloyd Bentsen
Electoral vote	3	0
Popular vote	166,559	127,739
Percentage	56.03%	42.97%

Bush
50–60%
60–70%
70–80%
80–90%
90–100%
Dukakis
40–50%
50–60%
60–70%
70–80%
80–90%
90–100%
President before election
Ronald Reagan
Republican
Elected President
George H. W. Bush
Republican

The 1988 United States presidential election in North Dakota took place on November 8, 1988. All 50 states and the District of Columbia were part of the 1988 United States presidential election. State voters chose three electors to the Electoral College, which selected the president and vice president.

North Dakota was won by incumbent United States Vice President George H. W. Bush of Texas, who was running against Massachusetts Governor Michael Dukakis. Bush ran with Indiana Senator Dan Quayle as vice president, and Dukakis ran with Texas Senator Lloyd Bentsen. Bush won the election in North Dakota with a solid 13-point landslide.

The election was very partisan, with nearly 99 percent of the electorate voting for either the Democratic or Republican parties. All major counties in North Dakota gave pluralities for Bush, including the relatively highly populated center of Cass County, which contains the city of Fargo. As has been typical ever since the 1960s, however, Dukakis gained large majorities in the two predominantly Native American counties of Rolette in the north and Sioux in the south, and he also carried by smaller margins a number of other counties in the northern and eastern portions of the state. This is one of only two elections (the other being 2020) since 1952 where national bellwether Sargent County in the state's southeast supported a losing candidate, with the anomaly most likely due to the farm crisis.

North Dakota weighed in for this election as five percent more Republican than the national average, a much smaller margin than usual due to the persistent farm crisis of the 1980s. As of the 2024 presidential election this remains the least Republican the state has been relative to the nation since Nixon's landslide win in 1972, when a "favorite son" effect with George McGovern from neighboring South Dakota was a likely influence.

== Primaries ==
North Dakota held the last primary of the election season on June 14, by which time the party nominations had effectively already been secured. Libertarian candidate Ron Paul entered due to it being an open primary, receiving 985 votes. For the Republicans, Bush received 37,062 votes to 2,372 for perennial candidate Mary Jane Rachner of Minnesota while Dukakis garnered 2,890 votes compared to 515 for Jesse Jackson.

== Results ==
1988 United States presidential election in North Dakota
Party	Candidate	Votes	Percentage	Electoral votes
Republican	George H. W. Bush	166,559	56.03%	3
Democratic-NPL	Michael Dukakis	127,739	42.97%	0
Libertarian	Ron Paul	1,315	0.44%	0
National Economic Recovery	Lyndon LaRouche	905	0.30%	0
New Alliance Party	Lenora Fulani	396	0.13%	0
Socialist Workers Party	James Warren	347	0.12%	0
Totals		297,261	100.0%	3

=== Results by county ===
County	George H. W. Bush Republican		Michael Dukakis Democratic-NPL		Ron Paul Libertarian		Lyndon LaRouche National Economic Recovery		Lenora Fulani New Alliance		James Warren Socialist Workers		Margin		Total votes cast
County	#	%	#	%	#	%	#	%	#	%	#	%	#	%	Total votes cast
Adams	1,018	58.61%	708	40.76%	1	0.06%	4	0.23%	4	0.23%	2	0.12%	310	17.85%	1,737
Barnes	3,631	55.47%	2,858	43.66%	24	0.37%	17	0.26%	8	0.12%	8	0.12%	773	11.81%	6,546
Benson	1,316	43.42%	1,691	55.79%	5	0.16%	13	0.43%	6	0.20%	0	0.00%	-375	-12.37%	3,031
Billings	437	66.31%	211	32.02%	11	1.67%	0	0.00%	0	0.00%	0	0.00%	226	34.29%	659
Bottineau	2,530	59.52%	1,684	39.61%	17	0.40%	17	0.40%	3	0.07%	0	0.00%	846	19.91%	4,251
Bowman	1,111	59.51%	737	39.48%	8	0.43%	7	0.37%	3	0.16%	1	0.05%	374	20.03%	1,867
Burke	971	57.46%	693	41.01%	11	0.65%	11	0.65%	2	0.12%	2	0.12%	278	16.45%	1,690
Burleigh	18,000	61.89%	10,760	37.00%	132	0.45%	101	0.35%	53	0.18%	38	0.13%	7,240	24.89%	29,084
Cass	26,699	54.34%	22,107	44.99%	181	0.37%	75	0.15%	36	0.07%	39	0.08%	4,592	9.35%	49,137
Cavalier	2,096	60.63%	1,333	38.56%	8	0.23%	9	0.26%	6	0.17%	5	0.14%	763	22.07%	3,457
Dickey	2,064	61.87%	1,249	37.44%	14	0.42%	6	0.18%	1	0.03%	2	0.06%	815	24.43%	3,336
Divide	869	49.15%	875	49.49%	5	0.28%	15	0.85%	4	0.23%	0	0.00%	-6	-0.34%	1,768
Dunn	1,263	57.99%	892	40.96%	5	0.23%	10	0.46%	5	0.23%	3	0.14%	371	17.03%	2,178
Eddy	891	53.74%	748	45.11%	8	0.48%	3	0.18%	3	0.18%	5	0.30%	143	8.63%	1,658
Emmons	1,634	62.94%	925	35.63%	10	0.39%	16	0.62%	8	0.31%	3	0.12%	709	27.31%	2,596
Foster	1,218	58.84%	837	40.43%	5	0.24%	7	0.34%	1	0.05%	2	0.10%	381	18.41%	2,070
Golden Valley	781	66.02%	388	32.80%	6	0.51%	8	0.68%	0	0.00%	0	0.00%	393	33.22%	1,183
Grand Forks	14,801	53.76%	12,494	45.38%	133	0.48%	45	0.16%	26	0.09%	32	0.12%	2,307	8.38%	27,531
Grant	1,351	66.13%	654	32.01%	16	0.78%	15	0.73%	1	0.05%	6	0.29%	697	34.12%	2,043
Griggs	1,020	54.11%	846	44.88%	13	0.69%	3	0.16%	2	0.11%	1	0.05%	174	9.23%	1,885
Hettinger	1,395	66.08%	698	33.06%	5	0.24%	8	0.38%	4	0.19%	1	0.05%	697	33.02%	2,111
Kidder	1,039	59.00%	678	38.50%	23	1.31%	13	0.74%	4	0.23%	4	0.23%	361	20.50%	1,761
LaMoure	1,642	56.60%	1,223	42.16%	10	0.34%	10	0.34%	8	0.28%	8	0.28%	419	14.44%	2,901
Logan	1,111	66.49%	540	32.32%	11	0.66%	4	0.24%	1	0.06%	4	0.24%	571	34.17%	1,671
McHenry	1,888	52.69%	1,665	46.47%	14	0.39%	9	0.25%	2	0.06%	5	0.14%	223	6.22%	3,583
McIntosh	1,726	73.54%	598	25.48%	9	0.38%	11	0.47%	1	0.04%	2	0.09%	1,128	48.06%	2,347
McKenzie	1,949	59.91%	1,273	39.13%	14	0.43%	12	0.37%	1	0.03%	4	0.12%	676	20.78%	3,253
McLean	2,906	53.85%	2,428	45.00%	30	0.56%	21	0.39%	5	0.09%	6	0.11%	478	8.85%	5,396
Mercer	3,013	61.46%	1,843	37.60%	22	0.45%	17	0.35%	4	0.08%	3	0.06%	1,170	23.86%	4,902
Morton	5,588	53.49%	4,708	45.07%	68	0.65%	50	0.48%	17	0.16%	16	0.15%	880	8.42%	10,447
Mountrail	1,443	41.73%	1,977	57.17%	17	0.49%	12	0.35%	5	0.14%	4	0.12%	-534	-15.44%	3,458
Nelson	1,078	48.06%	1,151	51.32%	5	0.22%	3	0.13%	2	0.09%	4	0.18%	-73	-3.26%	2,243
Oliver	696	56.27%	526	42.52%	4	0.32%	8	0.65%	2	0.16%	1	0.08%	170	13.75%	1,237
Pembina	2,471	59.56%	1,616	38.95%	40	0.96%	13	0.31%	6	0.14%	3	0.07%	855	20.61%	4,149
Pierce	1,422	57.41%	1,008	40.69%	22	0.89%	16	0.65%	3	0.12%	6	0.24%	414	16.72%	2,477
Ramsey	3,103	53.12%	2,665	45.63%	22	0.38%	31	0.53%	12	0.21%	8	0.14%	438	7.49%	5,841
Ransom	1,362	47.66%	1,459	51.05%	13	0.45%	9	0.31%	10	0.35%	5	0.17%	-97	-3.39%	2,858
Renville	893	51.03%	837	47.83%	5	0.29%	8	0.46%	1	0.06%	6	0.34%	56	3.20%	1,750
Richland	4,670	56.44%	3,523	42.58%	31	0.37%	26	0.31%	10	0.12%	14	0.17%	1,147	13.86%	8,274
Rolette	1,126	31.23%	2,426	67.28%	22	0.61%	18	0.50%	7	0.19%	7	0.19%	-1,300	-36.05%	3,606
Sargent	1,119	45.94%	1,306	53.61%	4	0.16%	5	0.21%	1	0.04%	1	0.04%	-187	-7.67%	2,436
Sheridan	885	67.15%	428	32.47%	1	0.08%	3	0.23%	1	0.08%	0	0.00%	457	34.68%	1,318
Sioux	325	31.19%	701	67.27%	7	0.67%	5	0.48%	3	0.29%	1	0.10%	-376	-36.08%	1,042
Slope	315	59.43%	202	38.11%	7	1.32%	3	0.57%	2	0.38%	1	0.19%	113	21.32%	530
Stark	6,137	61.35%	3,678	36.77%	59	0.59%	65	0.65%	47	0.47%	17	0.17%	2,459	24.58%	10,003
Steele	690	43.26%	895	56.11%	5	0.31%	3	0.19%	1	0.06%	1	0.06%	-205	-12.85%	1,595
Stutsman	5,375	55.59%	4,214	43.58%	29	0.30%	16	0.17%	19	0.20%	16	0.17%	1,161	12.01%	9,669
Towner	946	48.91%	970	50.16%	7	0.36%	2	0.10%	5	0.26%	4	0.21%	-24	-1.25%	1,934
Traill	2,562	56.20%	1,940	42.55%	26	0.57%	18	0.39%	5	0.11%	8	0.18%	622	13.65%	4,559
Walsh	3,250	54.48%	2,646	44.35%	42	0.70%	14	0.23%	9	0.15%	5	0.08%	604	10.13%	5,966
Ward	13,179	56.74%	9,906	42.65%	71	0.31%	46	0.20%	11	0.05%	15	0.06%	3,273	14.09%	23,228
Wells	1,901	58.65%	1,317	40.64%	8	0.25%	9	0.28%	2	0.06%	4	0.12%	584	18.01%	3,241
Williams	5,653	57.87%	4,004	40.99%	49	0.50%	35	0.36%	14	0.14%	13	0.13%	1,649	16.88%	9,768
Totals	166,559	56.03%	127,739	42.97%	1,315	0.44%	905	0.30%	396	0.13%	347	0.12%	38,820	13.06%	297,261

==== Counties that flipped from Republican to Democratic ====
- Benson
- Divide
- Mountrail
- Nelson
- Ransom
- Sargent
- Steele
- Towner

== See also ==
- United States presidential elections in North Dakota
- Presidency of George H. W. Bush
