= Mandaree School District =

School district in North Dakota, USA

Address
- 117 Warrior Way Mandaree, North Dakota, 58757; United States

District information
- Type: Public
- Grades: K–12
- Superintendent: Hector Salvador Serna
- Accreditation: Cognia
- NCES District ID: 3811850

Students and staff
- Students: 221
- Teachers: 20.0
- Staff: 31.0
- Student–teacher ratio: 11.05
- District mascot: Warriors
- Colors: Maroon and Gold

Other information
- Website: www.mandaree.k12.nd.us

Mandaree School District No. 36 is a school district headquartered in Mandaree, North Dakota. It is on the Fort Berthold Indian Reservation.

It is in McKenzie and Dunn counties. It is also affiliated with the Bureau of Indian Education (BIE). It is also known as Mandaree Day School.

== History ==
In the 1970s the principal, Robert Schumacher, started a radio station called KRSS.

In 1995 the school had 256 students.

In 2004 the Bureau of Indian Affairs (BIA), the parent agency of what became the BIE, investigated the special education program after parents made complaints.

In April 2020, Kirsten Baesler, the state superintendent of education, approved the school having a four-day week instead of a five day.

== Culture ==
The homecoming celebration uses Hidatsa traditions and, as of 1995, promotes abstaining from drugs and alcohol.
