= Manning, North Dakota =

- Census-designated place
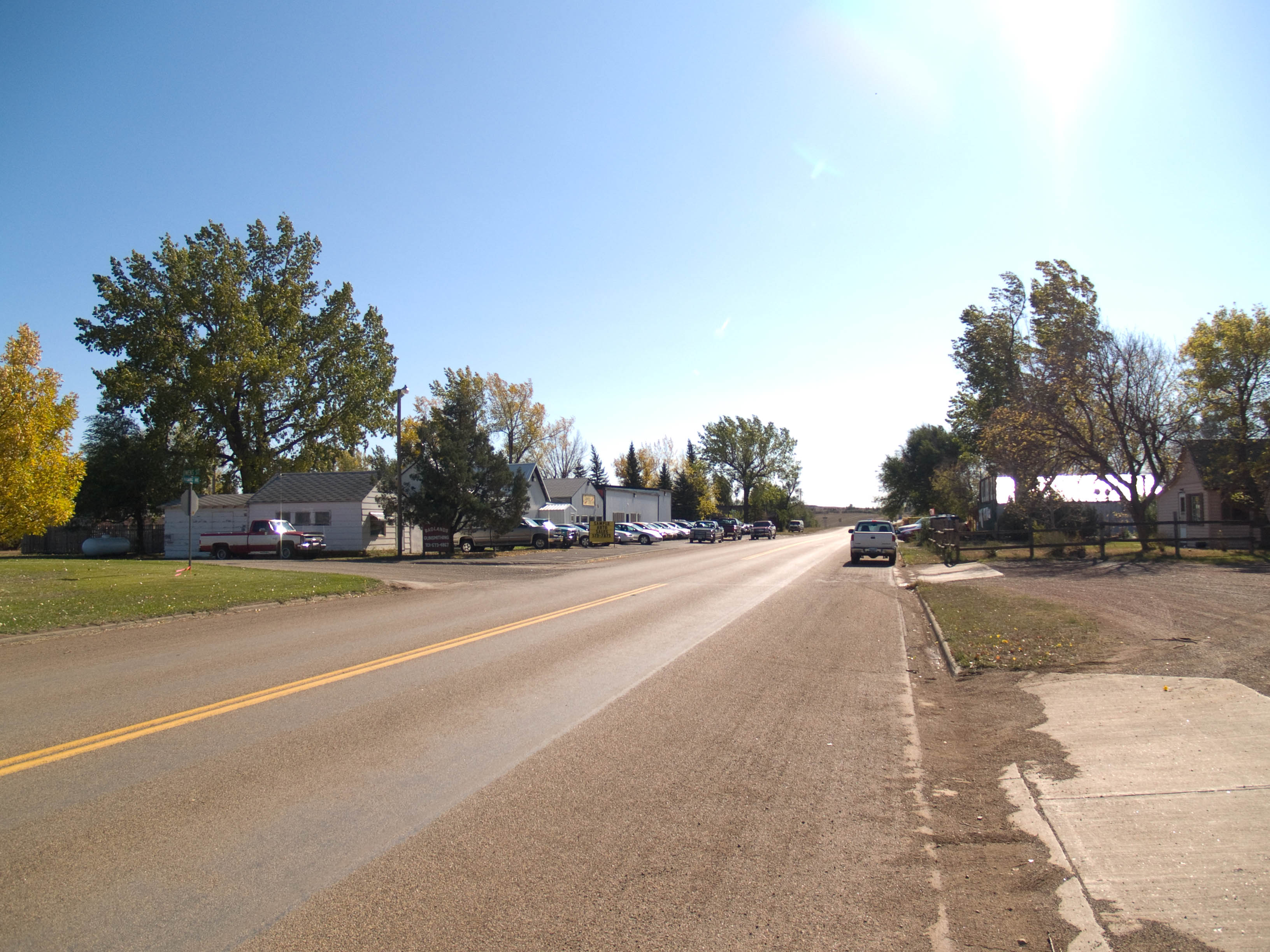
- Street in Manning

- Location within the state of North Dakota Manning (the United States)
- Coordinates: 47°13′52″N 102°46′13″W
- Country: United States
- State: North Dakota
- County: Dunn

Area
  - Total: 0.58 sq mi (1.49 km^{2})
  - Land: 0.58 sq mi (1.49 km^{2})
  - Water: 0 sq mi (0.00 km^{2})
- Elevation: 2,221 ft (677 m)

Population (2020)
  - Total: 47
  - Estimate (2023): 79
  - Density: 81.8/sq mi (31.58/km^{2})
- Time zone: UTC-7 (MST)
  - Summer (DST): UTC-6 (MDT)
- ZIP Code: 58642
- Area code: 701
- FIPS code: 38-50220
- GNIS feature ID: 2628576

Manning is a census-designated place in Dunn County, North Dakota, United States. It is the county seat of Dunn County. Manning was founded in 1908 to serve as the seat of Dunn County, itself organized that year. Its population was not reported in the 2000 census, but was included in the 2020 census, where a population of 47 was given, and was estimated to be 79 in 2023 with this population estimate being the only info available.

An unincorporated community, Manning, along with the surrounding inhabited vicinity, was designated part of the United States Census Bureau's Participant Statistical Areas Program on March 31, 2010, with the name of the Manning Census Designated Place

== Name ==
Manning was named after the pioneer rancher Dan Manning (1845–1914), who promoted the area. It was originally suggested that the community be named Owensville after William P. Owens (1870–1913) because administrative work was carried out at his home, but Owens declined to have the community named after him.

== Climate ==
This climatic region is typified by large seasonal temperature differences, with warm to hot (and often humid) summers and cold (sometimes severely cold) winters. According to the Köppen Climate Classification system, Manning has a humid continental climate, abbreviated "Dfb" on climate maps.

== Notable person ==
Mel Ruder, Pulitzer Prize winning journalist was born in Manning.

== Education ==
It is zoned to the Killdeer School District.

== Population ==
Historical population
Census	Pop.	Note	%±
2010	74		—
2020	47		−36.5%
2023 (est.)	79		68.1%
U.S. Decennial Census; 2020 Census
