= McKenzie County, North Dakota =

County in North Dakota, United States

- County
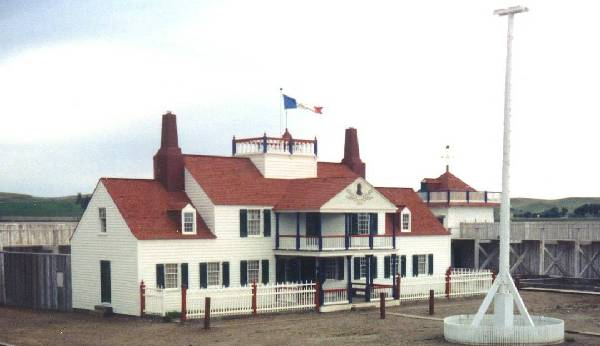
- Fort Union Trading Post National Historic Site

- Seal

- Location within the U.S. state of North Dakota
- Coordinates: 47.742475°N 103.403215°W
- Country: United States
- State: North Dakota
- Founded: March 9, 1883 (created); April 20, 1905 (organized)
- Named for: Alexander McKenzie
- Seat: Watford City
- Largest city: Watford City

Area
  - Total: 2,860.566 sq mi (7,408.83 km^{2})
  - Land: 2,760.133 sq mi (7,148.71 km^{2})
  - Water: 100.433 sq mi (260.12 km^{2}) 3.51%

Population (2020)
  - Total: 14,704
  - Estimate (2025): 15,192 ▲
  - Density: 5.3273/sq mi (2.0569/km^{2})

Time zones
- (northern portion): UTC−6 (Central)
  - Summer (DST): UTC−5 (CDT)
- (southern portion): UTC−7 (Mountain)
  - Summer (DST): UTC−6 (MDT)
- Area code: 701
- Congressional district: At-large
- Website: mckenziecountynd.gov

McKenzie County is a county in the U.S. state of North Dakota. As of the 2020 census, the population was 14,704, and was estimated to be 15,192 in 2025, The county seat and largest city is Watford City. McKenzie County is also the largest county in North Dakota by land area, and is home to the North Unit of Theodore Roosevelt National Park.

The county lies immediately adjacent to the Williston Micropolitan Statistical Area, although the Census Bureau does not include McKenzie County in that grouping.

== History ==
The Dakota Territory legislature created the county on March 9, 1883, with areas partitioned from Howard County (now extinct). The county was named for Alexander McKenzie, a territorial political figure who was later disgraced for corruption. The county was not organized at that time, and was not attached to another county for administrative or judicial purposes. The county's boundary was altered in 1885, and on March 2, 1891, the state legislature authorized the dissolution of the county, assigning its territories to Billings and Stark counties. However, this directive was not implemented, and McKenzie continued as a defined county until November 3, 1896, when another act was passed to dissolve the county and assign its territories to Billings County. This act was challenged in the courts, and on May 24, 1901, the state Supreme Court held that the county was to continue in existence.

On March 10, 1903, the county was attached to Stark County for administrative purposes. On March 16, 1905, McKenzie gained the territories of Allred and Wallace counties as those counties were administratively dissolved. On April 20, 1905, the McKenzie County government was organized, and its previous attachment to Stark was terminated.

The first county seat was Alexander. In 1907 the seat was moved to Schafer, and in 1941 it was moved to the present location, Watford City.

Between the 2010 and 2020 censuses, McKenzie County was the fastest growing county in the United States, growing by 131.2% from 6,360 to 14,704 inhabitants, largely due to the Bakken Formation oil boom.

== Geography ==
McKenzie County lies on the west line of North Dakota. Its west boundary line abuts the east boundary line of the state of Montana. The Missouri River flows easterly along the western portion of the county's north boundary line, and the enlargement of the Missouri as it discharges into Lake Sakakawea forms the eastern portion of the county's north and northeastern boundary line. The Yellowstone River flows into the northwestern corner of the county from Montana, and discharges into the Missouri at the county's northern boundary line. The Little Missouri River flows northeasterly through the county's lower portion, on its way to discharge into Lake Sakakawea, east of the county's east boundary line. The county terrain consists of semi-arid rolling hills, carved by river valleys and drainages. The area is partially devoted to agriculture. The terrain slopes to the east and north, with its highest point on its south boundary line, at 2,684 ft (818 m) ASL.

According to the United States Census Bureau, the county has a total area of 2,860.566 square miles (7,408.83 km^{2}), of which 2,760.133 square miles (7,148.71 km^{2}) is land and 100.433 square miles (260.12 km^{2}) (3.51%) is water. It is the largest county in North Dakota by total area.

The McKenzie County landscape features a wide diversity of physical features, ranging from sugarbeet fields bordering the Missouri River at the northwest corner of the county to rugged badlands near the Little Missouri River in the south, where Theodore Roosevelt National Park and the Little Missouri National Grassland are located. Between the two rivers is a large area of prairie, ranging from gentle rolling terrain to rocky, rugged pastures. The southeast corner of the county, bordering on the Little Missouri badlands of neighboring Dunn County, is abundant in wildlife, quaking aspen groves, and bur oak groves, interspersed in places with western red cedar on the north-facing slopes of the badlands.

The southwestern corner counties of North Dakota (Adams, Billings, Bowman, Golden Valley, Grant, Hettinger, Slope, Stark) observe Mountain Time. The counties of McKenzie, Dunn, and Sioux are split between Mountain and Central Time.

=== Major highways ===
- U.S. Highway 85
- North Dakota Highway 22
- North Dakota Highway 23
- North Dakota Highway 58
- North Dakota Highway 68
- North Dakota Highway 73
- North Dakota Highway 200
- North Dakota Highway 1806

=== Adjacent counties ===
- Williams County - north (observes Central Time)
- Mountrail County - northeast (observes Central Time)
- Dunn County - southeast (observes Mountain Time in western section)
- Billings County - south (observes Mountain Time)
- Golden Valley County - southwest (observes Mountain Time)
- Wibaux County, Montana - west (observes Mountain Time)
- Richland County, Montana - northwest (observes Mountain Time)

=== Protected areas ===
- Antelope Creek State Game Management Area
- Antelope Creek State Wildlife Refuge
- Bear Den Creek Public Use Area
- Little Missouri National Grassland (part)
- Maah Daah Hey Trail
- Theodore Roosevelt National Park (North Unit - contained within LM National Grassland)
- Tobacco Garden Creek State Game Management Area
- Tobacco Garden Creek Recreation Area

=== Lakes ===
- Demicks Lake
- Lake Sakakawea
- Nohly Lake

== Demographics ==
Historical population
Census	Pop.	Note	%±
1910	5,720		—
1920	9,544		66.9%
1930	9,709		1.7%
1940	8,426		−13.2%
1950	6,849		−18.7%
1960	7,296		6.5%
1970	6,127		−16.0%
1980	7,132		16.4%
1990	6,383		−10.5%
2000	5,737		−10.1%
2010	6,360		10.9%
2020	14,704		131.2%
2025 (est.)	15,192	▲	3.3%
U.S. Decennial Census; 1790–1960 1900–1990; 1990–2000 2010–2020

As of the fourth quarter of 2024, the median home value in McKenzie County was $378,579.

As of the 2023 American Community Survey, there are 5,910 estimated households in McKenzie County with an average of 2.37 persons per household. The county has a median household income of $88,289. Approximately 8.1% of the county's population lives at or below the poverty line. McKenzie County has an estimated 69.8% employment rate, with 22.8% of the population holding a bachelor's degree or higher and 92.3% holding a high school diploma.

The top five reported ancestries (people were allowed to report up to two ancestries, thus the figures will generally add to more than 100%) were English (91.0%), Spanish (4.9%), Indo-European (1.2%), Asian and Pacific Islander (0.9%), and Other (2.0%).

The median age in the county was 31.2 years.

McKenzie County, North Dakota – racial and ethnic composition
Note: the US Census treats Hispanic/Latino as an ethnic category. This table excludes Latinos from the racial categories and assigns them to a separate category. Hispanics/Latinos may be of any race.

Race / ethnicity (NH = non-Hispanic)	Pop. 1980	Pop. 1990	Pop. 2000	Pop. 2010	Pop. 2020
White alone (NH)	6,143 (86.13%)	5,426 (85.01%)	4,419 (77.03%)	4,746 (74.62%)	10,268 (69.83%)
Black or African American alone (NH)	1 (0.01%)	2 (0.03%)	4 (0.07%)	4 (0.06%)	214 (1.46%)
Native American or Alaska Native alone (NH)	915 (12.83%)	898 (14.07%)	1,191 (20.76%)	1,349 (21.21%)	1,823 (12.40%)
Asian alone (NH)	7 (0.10%)	3 (0.05%)	2 (0.03%)	19 (0.30%)	171 (1.16%)
Pacific Islander alone (NH)	—	—	1 (0.02%)	2 (0.03%)	5 (0.03%)
Other race alone (NH)	2 (0.03%)	0 (0.00%)	2 (0.03%)	4 (0.06%)	67 (0.46%)
Mixed race or multiracial (NH)	—	—	60 (1.05%)	97 (1.53%)	624 (4.24%)
Hispanic or Latino (any race)	64 (0.90%)	54 (0.85%)	58 (1.01%)	139 (2.19%)	1,532 (10.42%)
Total	7,132 (100.00%)	6,383 (100.00%)	5,737 (100.00%)	6,360 (100.00%)	14,704 (100.00%)

=== 2023 estimate ===
As of the 2023 estimate, there were 14,252 people and 5,910 households residing in the county. There were 7,841 housing units at an average density of 2.84 per square mile (1.1/km^{2}). The racial makeup of the county was 84.5% White (74.0% NH White), 2.2% African American, 8.3% Native American, 1.2% Asian, 0.1% Pacific Islander, _% from some other races and 3.7% from two or more races. Hispanic or Latino people of any race were 13.0% of the population.

=== 2020 census ===
As of the 2020 census, there were 14,704 people, 5,416 households, and 3,519 families residing in the county. The population density was 5.3 inhabitants per square mile (2.0/km^{2}). There were 7,661 housing units at an average density of 2.78 per square mile (1.1/km^{2}).

Of the residents, 29.5% were under the age of 18 and 8.6% were 65 years of age or older; the median age was 30.9 years. For every 100 females there were 116.7 males, and for every 100 females age 18 and over there were 121.3 males.

There were 5,416 households in the county, of which 38.4% had children under the age of 18 living with them and 15.2% had a female householder with no spouse or partner present. About 26.0% of all households were made up of individuals and 6.1% had someone living alone who was 65 years of age or older.

About 29.3% of the housing units were vacant. Among occupied housing units, 48.7% were owner-occupied and 51.3% were renter-occupied. The homeowner vacancy rate was 2.7% and the rental vacancy rate was 31.9%.

The racial makeup of the county was 72.3% White, 1.5% Black or African American, 12.9% American Indian and Alaska Native, 1.2% Asian, 4.8% from some other race, and 7.3% from two or more races. Hispanic or Latino residents of any race comprised 10.4% of the population.

=== 2010 census ===
As of the 2010 census, there were 6,360 people, 2,410 households, and 1,682 families residing in the county. The population density was 2.3 inhabitants per square mile (0.9/km^{2}). There were 3,090 housing units at an average density of 1.12 per square mile (0.4/km^{2}). The racial makeup of the county was 75.35% White, 0.13% African American, 22.20% Native American, 0.30% Asian, 0.03% Pacific Islander, 0.42% from some other races and 1.57% from two or more races. Hispanic or Latino people of any race were 2.19% of the population.

In terms of ancestry, 39.5% were Norwegian, 30.6% were German, 6.1% were Irish, and 0.7% were American.

There were 2,410 households, 33.7% had children under the age of 18 living with them, 52.7% were married couples living together, 10.2% had a female householder with no husband present, 30.2% were non-families, and 25.3% of all households were made up of individuals. The average household size was 2.58 and the average family size was 3.06. The median age was 38.0 years.

The median income for a household in the county was $48,480 and the median income for a family was $58,906. Males had a median income of $42,803 versus $33,056 for females. The per capita income for the county was $27,605. About 6.7% of families and 10.0% of the population were below the poverty line, including 12.8% of those under age 18 and 10.0% of those age 65 or over.

== Communities ==
=== Cities ===
- Alexander
- Arnegard
- Watford City (county seat)

=== Census-designated places ===
- East Fairview
- Four Bears Village
- Mandaree

=== Unincorporated communities ===
- Banks
- Cartwright
- Charbonneau
- Charlson
- Dore
- Grassy Butte
- Hawkeye
- Homesteaders Gap
- Johnsons Corner (or Johnson Corner)
- Keene
- Kroff
- Rawson
- Schafer

=== Townships ===
- Alex
- Antelope Creek
- Arnegard
- Blue Butte
- Charbon
- Elm Tree
- Ellsworth
- Grail
- Hawkeye
- Keene
- Randolph
- Riverview
- Sioux
- Tri
- Twin Valley
- Yellowstone

=== Defunct townships ===
Elk, Poe, and Wilbur townships merged January 1, 2002, to form Tri Township.

== Politics ==
McKenzie County voters have traditionally voted Republican. In only one national election since 1948 has the county selected the Democratic Party candidate (as of 2024).

United States presidential election results for McKenzie County, North Dakota
Year	Republican		Democratic		Third party(ies)	
Year	No.	%	No.	%	No.	%
1908	574	68.41%	212	25.27%	53	6.32%
1912	285	27.54%	293	28.31%	457	44.15%
1916	1,394	45.16%	1,456	47.17%	237	7.68%
1920	2,587	79.50%	511	15.70%	156	4.79%
1924	1,113	38.14%	137	4.69%	1,668	57.16%
1928	2,100	61.14%	1,289	37.53%	46	1.34%
1932	710	20.02%	2,655	74.85%	182	5.13%
1936	570	14.66%	2,885	74.20%	433	11.14%
1940	1,563	38.63%	2,440	60.31%	43	1.06%
1944	1,241	43.35%	1,592	55.61%	30	1.05%
1948	1,168	45.08%	1,227	47.36%	196	7.56%
1952	2,260	71.70%	846	26.84%	46	1.46%
1956	1,609	53.15%	1,405	46.42%	13	0.43%
1960	1,715	53.08%	1,514	46.86%	2	0.06%
1964	1,352	46.02%	1,584	53.91%	2	0.07%
1968	1,625	59.63%	935	34.31%	165	6.06%
1972	1,913	65.87%	937	32.27%	54	1.86%
1976	1,595	53.56%	1,335	44.83%	48	1.61%
1980	2,265	67.25%	867	25.74%	236	7.01%
1984	2,610	71.96%	974	26.85%	43	1.19%
1988	1,949	59.91%	1,273	39.13%	31	0.95%
1992	1,324	42.85%	787	25.47%	979	31.68%
1996	1,338	49.50%	928	34.33%	437	16.17%
2000	1,634	69.12%	653	27.62%	77	3.26%
2004	1,897	68.68%	847	30.67%	18	0.65%
2008	1,740	64.09%	933	34.36%	42	1.55%
2012	2,458	71.23%	927	26.86%	66	1.91%
2016	3,670	78.55%	698	14.94%	304	6.51%
2020	4,482	82.71%	814	15.02%	123	2.27%
2024	4,627	83.81%	809	14.65%	85	1.54%

== Education ==
School districts include:

K–12:

- Alexander Public School District 2
- Mandaree Public School District 36
- McKenzie County Public School District 1
- New Town Public School District 1
- Williston Basin School District 7

Elementary:

- Earl Public School District 18
- Horse Creek Public School District 32
- Yellowstone Public School District 14

Former districts

- Grassy Butte District - Merged into the Killdeer district
- Williston Public School District 1 - Merged into Williston Basin district in 2021

== See also ==
- National Register of Historic Places listings in McKenzie County, North Dakota
