= Killdeer Mountains =

Buttes in North Dakota, United States

Highest point
- Peak: Killdeer Mountain
- Elevation: 3,281 ft (1,000 m)
- Coordinates: 47°27′07″N 102°54′34″W

Dimensions
- Area: 26 km^{2} (10 mi^{2})

Naming
- Etymology: Named after the local native bird, Killdeer

Geography
- Country: United States
- State: North Dakota
- Region: Dunn County

The Killdeer Mountains are two large flat-topped buttes in Dunn County, North Dakota, United States. They consist of North Mountain and South Mountain. The tops consist of Miocene age tuffaceous siltstones, sandstones and carbonates of the Arikaree Formation. Below, are outcrops of the Eocene sandstones and mudstones of the Chadron Formation, and the Golden Valley Formation. Much of their formation was caused by wind, river and lake erosion.

The Killdeer Mountains cover a surface of 26 square kilometers (10 sq mi). The highest peak reaches 3,281 ft (1,000 m), which is the highest point in the county.

The name comes from the Native Americans, who used the area as a hunting ground for deer. The butte was the scene of the Battle of Killdeer Mountain in 1864.

Upland deciduous forest with aspen, oak, birch, ash and poplar covers much of the Killdeer Mountains.

In 1906, reports of volcanic activity were coming from the mountains. However, no geological evidence has proven a confirmed volcano in the area.
