= Dunn County, North Dakota =

County in North Dakota, United States

- County
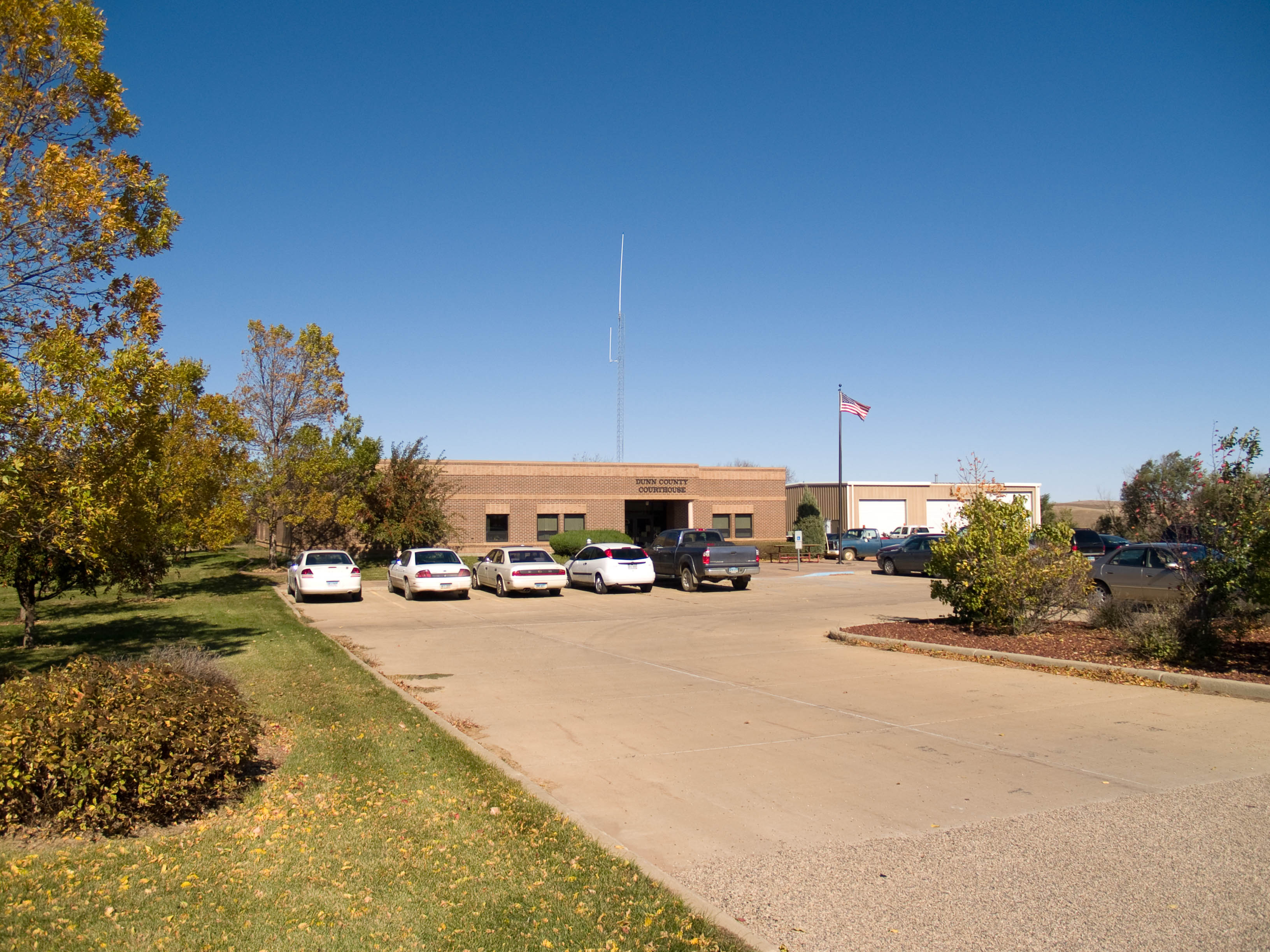
- The Dunn County Courthouse in Manning

- Seal

- Location within the U.S. state of North Dakota
- Coordinates: 47.354557°N 102.612322°W
- Country: United States
- State: North Dakota
- Founded: March 9, 1883 (created); January 18, 1908 (organized)
- Seat: Manning
- Largest city: Killdeer

Area
  - Total: 2,082.056 sq mi (5,392.50 km^{2})
  - Land: 2,008.492 sq mi (5,201.97 km^{2})
  - Water: 73.564 sq mi (190.53 km^{2}) 3.53%

Population (2020)
  - Total: 4,095
  - Estimate (2025): 4,058 ▼
  - Density: 2.007/sq mi (0.775/km^{2})

Time zones
- (northern portion): UTC−6 (Central)
  - Summer (DST): UTC−5 (CDT)
- (southern portion): UTC−7 (Mountain)
  - Summer (DST): UTC−6 (MDT)
- Area code: 701
- Congressional district: At-large
- Website: dunncountynd.gov

Dunn County is a county in the U.S. state of North Dakota. As of the 2020 census, the population was 4,095, and was estimated to be 4,058 in 2025. The county seat is Manning and the largest city is Killdeer.

== History ==
On March 9, 1883, the Dakota Territory legislature authorized the creation of a new county, using territory partitioned from Howard County (which is now extinct). The county organization was not affected at that time, but the county was not attached to another county for judicial purposes.

The county boundaries were altered in 1883, and on November 3, 1896, the legislature ordered Dunn dissolved, with its territory assigned to Stark County. However, the state supreme court overturned the legislature's act on May 24, 1901; in effect re-creating Dunn County. The county was still not assigned to another county. This was resolved on March 10, 1903, when the county was assigned to Stark County for judicial purposes.

On March 13, 1903, the legislature again voted to dissolve Dunn County, but again (during the 1905 session) the state supreme court voided the act. Dunn County continued to be attached to Stark County. However, on January 18, 1908, the county organization was affected, and Dunn became a standalone county. In the process, Dunn gained a tract of previously unattached land from Stark County, enlarging its boundary. The configuration thus created has remained to the present. The county was named for John Piatt Dunn, who opened the first drugstore in North Dakota, and who was a civic and commercial leader during the early history of Bismarck.

== Geography ==
The Missouri River flows southeasterly along the northeastern boundary of Dunn County, and the Little Missouri River flows eastward across the center part of the county, to its confluence with the Missouri in the northeastern part of the county. The county terrain consists of semi-arid rolling hills, which are etched in the north and east by gullies and drainages to the river valleys. The terrain slopes to the east and north; its highest point is a hill at the southwestern corner, at 2,625 ft (800 m) ASL.

According to the United States Census Bureau, the county has a total area of 2,082.056 square miles (5,392.50 km^{2}), of which 2,008.492 square miles (5,201.97 km^{2}) is land and 73.564 square miles (190.53 km^{2}) (3.53%) is water. It is the 6th largest county in North Dakota by total area.

Dunn County is somewhat unusual among western North Dakota counties. Like other counties in the region, it has both prairie and badlands areas. Located in the northwest part of the county are the Killdeer Mountains, which are more accurately described as hills. These hills help create a mini-ecosystem on the southern edge of the Little Missouri badlands, which has a greater abundance of aspen forests and wildlife than is typically found in southwestern North Dakota. The Killdeer Mountains' highest point, and the highest point in Dunn County, is 3281 feet above sea level.

The northwest corner of the county, northwest of the Killdeer Mountains, features many square miles of bur oak forest, mainly on the north-facing slopes of the hills. Bur oak and quaking aspen, though native to North Dakota, are sparse in western North Dakota, with Dunn County being a notable exception.

=== Major highways ===
- North Dakota Highway 8
- North Dakota Highway 22
- North Dakota Highway 200

=== Adjacent counties ===
- Mountrail County – north
- McLean County – northeast
- Mercer County – east
- Stark County – south
- Billings County – southwest
- McKenzie County – northwest

=== Protected areas ===
- Lake Ilo National Wildlife Refuge
- Little Missouri Public Use Area
- Kildeer Mountain State Game Preserve
- Badlands Trail Rides
- Little Mountain State Park

=== Lakes ===
- Moffet Slough
- Lake Sakakawea (part)

== Demographics ==
Historical population
Census	Pop.	Note	%±
1890	159		—
1910	5,302		—
1920	8,828		66.5%
1930	9,566		8.4%
1940	8,376		−12.4%
1950	7,212		−13.9%
1960	6,350		−12.0%
1970	4,895		−22.9%
1980	4,627		−5.5%
1990	4,005		−13.4%
2000	3,600		−10.1%
2010	3,536		−1.8%
2020	4,095		15.8%
2025 (est.)	4,058	▼	−0.9%
U.S. Decennial Census; 1790–1960 1900–1990; 1990–2000 2010–2020

=== Other estimates ===
As of the fourth quarter of 2024, the median home value in Dunn County was $258,531.

As of the 2023 American Community Survey, there are 1,513 estimated households in Dunn County with an average of 2.60 persons per household. The county has a median household income of $94,688. Approximately 11.2% of the county's population lives at or below the poverty line. Dunn County has an estimated 63.0% employment rate, with 20.6% of the population holding a bachelor's degree or higher and 92.7% holding a high school diploma.

The top five reported ancestries (people were allowed to report up to two ancestries, thus the figures will generally add to more than 100%) were English (89.9%), Spanish (2.7%), Indo-European (2.4%), Asian and Pacific Islander (0.6%), and Other (4.3%).

The median age in the county was 40.8 years.

Dunn County, North Dakota – racial and ethnic composition
Note: the US Census treats Hispanic/Latino as an ethnic category. This table excludes Latinos from the racial categories and assigns them to a separate category. Hispanics/Latinos may be of any race.

Race / ethnicity (NH = non-Hispanic)	Pop. 1980	Pop. 1990	Pop. 2000	Pop. 2010	Pop. 2020
White alone (NH)	4,144 (89.56%)	3,596 (89.79%)	3,101 (86.14%)	2,984 (84.39%)	3,241 (79.15%)
Black or African American alone (NH)	1 (0.02%)	0 (0.00%)	1 (0.03%)	8 (0.23%)	23 (0.56%)
Native American or Alaska Native alone (NH)	447 (9.66%)	377 (9.41%)	441 (12.25%)	443 (12.53%)	455 (11.11%)
Asian alone (NH)	1 (0.02%)	6 (0.15%)	3 (0.08%)	10 (0.28%)	32 (0.78%)
Pacific Islander alone (NH)	—	—	0 (0.00%)	0 (0.00%)	0 (0.00%)
Other race alone (NH)	0 (0.00%)	0 (0.00%)	0 (0.00%)	0 (0.00%)	10 (0.24%)
Mixed race or multiracial (NH)	—	—	27 (0.75%)	53 (1.50%)	227 (5.54%)
Hispanic or Latino (any race)	34 (0.73%)	26 (0.65%)	27 (0.75%)	38 (1.07%)	107 (2.61%)
Total	4,627 (100.00%)	4,005 (100.00%)	3,600 (100.00%)	3,536 (100.00%)	4,095 (100.00%)

=== 2024 estimate ===
As of the 2024 estimate, there were 4,031 people and 1,513 households residing in the county. There were 2,158 housing units at an average density of 1.07 per square mile (0.4/km^{2}). The racial makeup of the county was 83.5% White (80.5% NH White), 1.9% African American, 9.2% Native American, 1.7% Asian, 0.0% Pacific Islander, _% from some other races and 3.8% from two or more races. Hispanic or Latino people of any race were 4.3% of the population.

=== 2020 census ===
As of the 2020 census, there were 4,095 people, 1,558 households, and 1,055 families residing in the county. The population density was 2.0 inhabitants per square mile (0.8/km^{2}). There were 2,105 housing units at an average density of 1.05 per square mile (0.4/km^{2}) in the county.

Of the residents, 25.4% were under the age of 18 and 17.0% were 65 years of age or older; the median age was 38.8 years. For every 100 females there were 109.7 males, and for every 100 females age 18 and over there were 112.7 males.

The racial makeup of the county was 80.0% White, 0.6% Black or African American, 11.2% American Indian and Alaska Native, 0.8% Asian, 1.0% from some other race, and 6.4% from two or more races. Hispanic or Latino residents of any race comprised 2.6% of the population.

There were 1,558 households in the county, of which 32.0% had children under the age of 18 living with them and 14.8% had a female householder with no spouse or partner present. About 26.5% of all households were made up of individuals and 9.7% had someone living alone who was 65 years of age or older.

There were 2,105 housing units, of which 26.0% were vacant. Among occupied housing units, 73.0% were owner-occupied and 27.0% were renter-occupied. The homeowner vacancy rate was 1.5% and the rental vacancy rate was 18.9%.

=== 2010 census ===
As of the 2010 census, there were 3,536 people, 1,401 households, and 977 families residing in the county. The population density was 1.8 inhabitants per square mile (0.7/km^{2}). There were 2,132 housing units at an average density of 1.06 per square mile (0.4/km^{2}). The racial makeup of the county was 84.93% White, 0.23% African American, 12.70% Native American, 0.28% Asian, 0.00% Pacific Islander, 0.17% from some other races and 1.70% from two or more races. Hispanic or Latino people of any race were 1.07% of the population.

In terms of ancestry, 57.6% were German, 20.3% were Norwegian, 8.5% were Czech, 6.0% were Russian, 5.7% were Irish, 5.3% were English, and 1.8% were American.

There were 1,401 households, 28.1% had children under the age of 18 living with them, 57.7% were married couples living together, 6.6% had a female householder with no husband present, 30.3% were non-families, and 26.5% of all households were made up of individuals. The average household size was 2.43 and the average family size was 2.93. The median age was 44.4 years.

The median income for a household in the county was $48,707 and the median income for a family was $65,122. Males had a median income of $37,270 versus $23,599 for females. The per capita income for the county was $24,832. About 6.2% of families and 8.6% of the population were below the poverty line, including 7.5% of those under age 18 and 12.1% of those age 65 or over.

== Sites of interest ==
- Killdeer Mountains
- Killdeer Mountain National Battlefield

== Communities ==
=== Cities ===
- Dodge
- Dunn Center
- Halliday
- Killdeer

=== Census-designated place ===
- Manning (county seat)

=== Unincorporated communities ===
- Emerson
- Fayette
- Hirschville
- Marshall
- Medicine Hole
- New Hradec
- Oakdale
- Twin Buttes
- Werner

== Politics ==
Dunn County has voted Republican in every election since 1976.

United States presidential election results for Dunn County, North Dakota
Year	Republican		Democratic		Third party(ies)	
Year	No.	%	No.	%	No.	%
1908	373	68.82%	160	29.52%	9	1.66%
1912	285	32.39%	246	27.95%	349	39.66%
1916	566	34.43%	1,028	62.53%	50	3.04%
1920	2,102	80.60%	457	17.52%	49	1.88%
1924	980	42.78%	190	8.29%	1,121	48.93%
1928	1,360	46.50%	1,561	53.37%	4	0.14%
1932	569	18.92%	2,380	79.12%	59	1.96%
1936	732	21.65%	2,257	66.76%	392	11.59%
1940	2,132	60.29%	1,392	39.37%	12	0.34%
1944	1,374	59.79%	919	39.99%	5	0.22%
1948	1,244	51.34%	1,074	44.33%	105	4.33%
1952	2,237	76.50%	664	22.71%	23	0.79%
1956	1,567	59.63%	1,055	40.14%	6	0.23%
1960	1,462	52.53%	1,321	47.47%	0	0.00%
1964	1,079	44.37%	1,351	55.55%	2	0.08%
1968	1,207	56.17%	772	35.92%	170	7.91%
1972	1,438	65.45%	644	29.31%	115	5.23%
1976	1,041	48.26%	1,051	48.73%	65	3.01%
1980	1,706	71.50%	532	22.30%	148	6.20%
1984	1,583	68.12%	716	30.81%	25	1.08%
1988	1,263	57.99%	892	40.96%	23	1.06%
1992	784	37.24%	667	31.69%	654	31.07%
1996	830	47.62%	587	33.68%	326	18.70%
2000	1,124	65.05%	474	27.43%	130	7.52%
2004	1,178	66.40%	571	32.19%	25	1.41%
2008	1,080	65.69%	527	32.06%	37	2.25%
2012	1,506	74.04%	508	24.98%	20	0.98%
2016	1,771	78.96%	358	15.96%	114	5.08%
2020	1,951	83.45%	342	14.63%	45	1.92%
2024	1,877	83.72%	332	14.81%	33	1.47%

== Education ==
School districts include:

K-12:

- Beulah Public School District 27
- Dickinson Public School District 1
- Halliday Public School District 19 (now closed)
- Hebron Public School District 13
- Killdeer Public School District 16
- Mandaree Public School District 36
- Richardton-Taylor Public School District 34
- South Heart Public School District 9

Elementary:

- Twin Buttes Public School District 37

== See also ==
- National Register of Historic Places listings in Dunn County, North Dakota
