= Keene, North Dakota =

- Township
- Location within North Dakota
- Coordinates: 47°55′37″N 102°56′30″W
- Country: United States
- State: North Dakota
- County: McKenzie

Area
  - Total: 36.9 sq mi (95.5 km^{2})
  - Land: 36.9 sq mi (95.5 km^{2})
  - Water: 0 sq mi (0.0 km^{2})
- Elevation: 2,333 ft (711 m)

Population (2000)
  - Total: 35
  - Density: 1.0/sq mi (0.4/km^{2})
- Time zone: UTC-6 (Central (CST))
  - Summer (DST): UTC-5 (CDT)
- ZIP code: 58847
- Area code: 701
- FIPS code: 38-41580
- GNIS feature ID: 1034953

Keene is an unincorporated community in McKenzie County, North Dakota in the United States. In this zip code area, the 2000 census found 258 people.

== Climate ==
This climatic region is typified by large seasonal temperature differences, with warm to hot (and often humid) summers and cold (sometimes severely cold) winters. According to the Köppen Climate Classification system, Keene has a humid continental climate, abbreviated "Dfb" on climate maps.

Climate data for Keene 3 S, North Dakota (1991–2020 normals, extremes 1959–present)
Month	Jan	Feb	Mar	Apr	May	Jun	Jul	Aug	Sep	Oct	Nov	Dec	Year
Record high °F (°C)	56 (13)	65 (18)	80 (27)	96 (36)	101 (38)	105 (41)	108 (42)	104 (40)	102 (39)	93 (34)	80 (27)	58 (14)	108 (42)
Mean daily maximum °F (°C)	22.4 (−5.3)	27.3 (−2.6)	40.3 (4.6)	56.0 (13.3)	67.4 (19.7)	75.8 (24.3)	83.0 (28.3)	83.4 (28.6)	73.1 (22.8)	56.2 (13.4)	38.5 (3.6)	25.9 (−3.4)	54.1 (12.3)
Daily mean °F (°C)	13.1 (−10.5)	17.5 (−8.1)	29.4 (−1.4)	42.8 (6.0)	54.0 (12.2)	63.1 (17.3)	69.2 (20.7)	68.8 (20.4)	59.1 (15.1)	44.3 (6.8)	29.0 (−1.7)	17.1 (−8.3)	42.3 (5.7)
Mean daily minimum °F (°C)	3.8 (−15.7)	7.6 (−13.6)	18.6 (−7.4)	29.6 (−1.3)	40.7 (4.8)	50.4 (10.2)	55.4 (13.0)	54.2 (12.3)	45.0 (7.2)	32.3 (0.2)	19.6 (−6.9)	8.2 (−13.2)	30.5 (−0.8)
Record low °F (°C)	−41 (−41)	−38 (−39)	−27 (−33)	−14 (−26)	11 (−12)	22 (−6)	27 (−3)	30 (−1)	13 (−11)	−7 (−22)	−24 (−31)	−43 (−42)	−43 (−42)
Average precipitation inches (mm)	0.52 (13)	0.45 (11)	0.71 (18)	1.12 (28)	2.64 (67)	3.32 (84)	2.95 (75)	1.67 (42)	1.85 (47)	1.35 (34)	0.72 (18)	0.60 (15)	17.90 (455)
Average snowfall inches (cm)	7.6 (19)	6.1 (15)	6.1 (15)	2.7 (6.9)	0.7 (1.8)	0.0 (0.0)	0.0 (0.0)	0.0 (0.0)	0.0 (0.0)	2.0 (5.1)	3.1 (7.9)	6.5 (17)	34.8 (88)
Average precipitation days (≥ 0.01 in)	4.2	3.7	3.9	5.9	9.0	11.0	8.8	6.3	6.3	5.5	4.4	5.0	74.0
Average snowy days (≥ 0.1 in)	3.4	2.9	1.9	0.7	0.1	0.0	0.0	0.0	0.0	0.9	1.9	3.8	15.6
Source: NOAA
