= Little Missouri River (North Dakota) =

River in the north-central United States

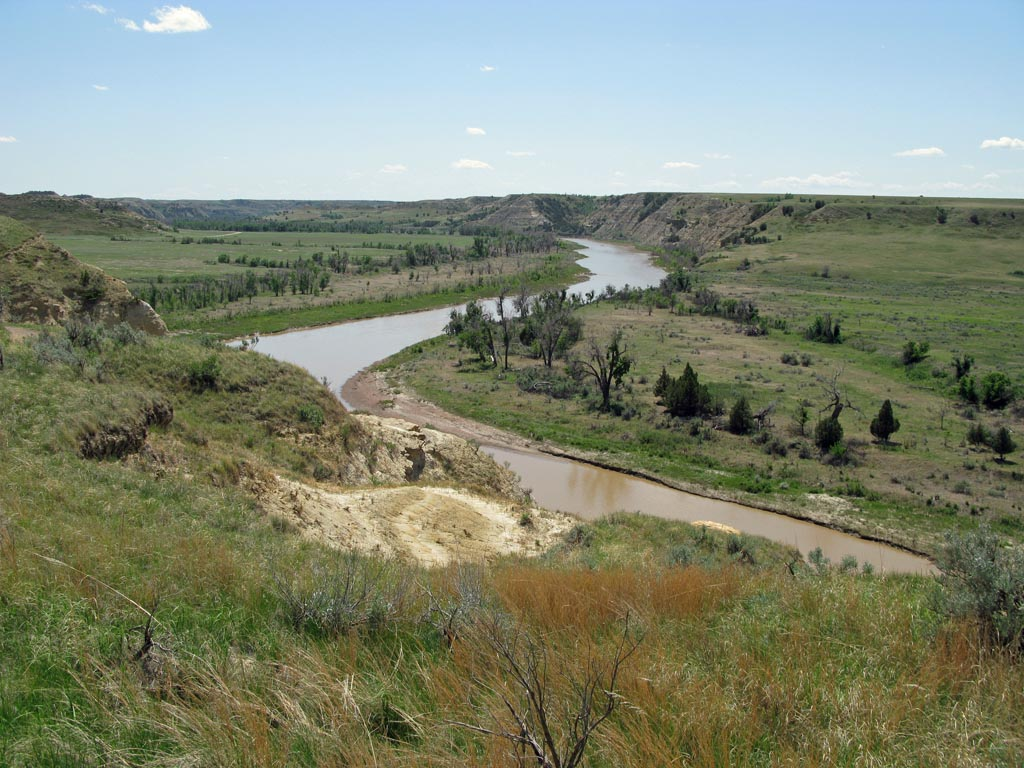
- Flowing through Theodore Roosevelt National Park

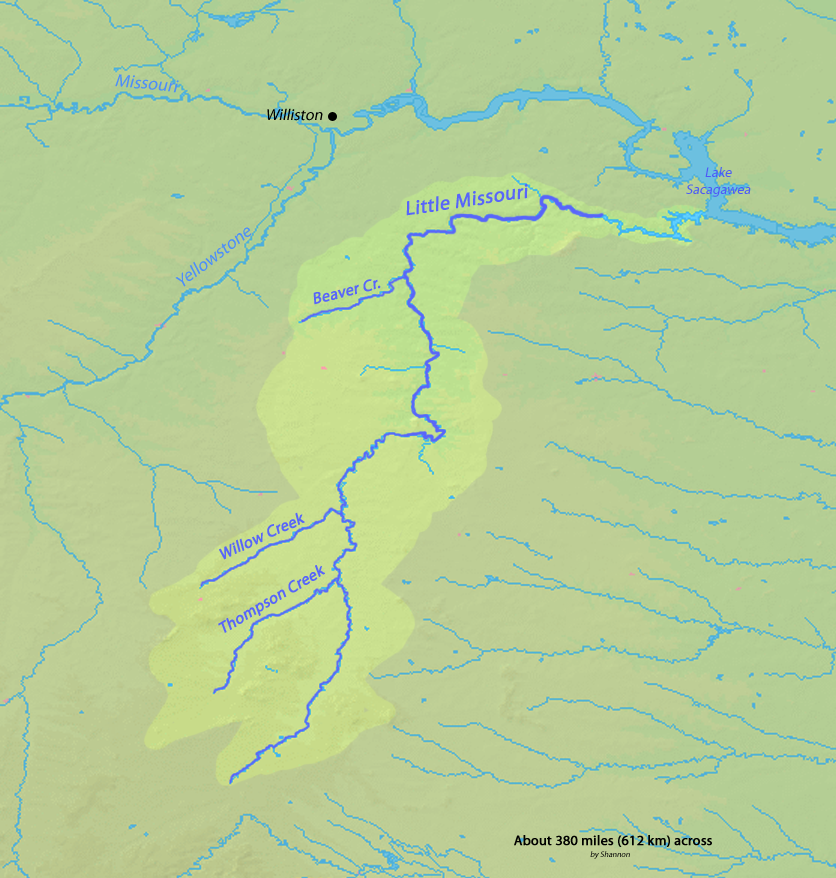
- Little Missouri watershed

- Location of the mouth of the Little Missouri River in North Dakota

Location
- Country: United States
- State: Wyoming, Montana, South Dakota, North Dakota

Physical characteristics
- Source: Flatiron Butte
  - location: near Oshoto, Crook County, Wyoming
  - coordinates: 44°32′25″N 104°59′57″W
  - elevation: 4,501 ft (1,372 m)
- Mouth: Missouri River
  - location: Lake Sakakawea, near Killdeer, Dunn County, North Dakota
  - coordinates: 47°36′38″N 102°52′24″W
  - elevation: 1,860 ft (570 m)
- Length: 560 mi (900 km)
- Basin size: 8,310 sq mi (21,500 km^{2})
- Discharge
  - location: 17.5 miles (28.2 km) south of Watford City, about 25 miles (40 km) from the mouth
  - average: 534 cu ft/s (15.1 m^{3}/s)
  - minimum: 0 cu ft/s (0 m^{3}/s)
  - maximum: 110,000 cu ft/s (3,100 m^{3}/s)

Basin features
- Tributaries
  - left: Slick Creek; Ebert Creek; Tie Creek; Wagon Creek
  - right: Fortyeight Mile Creek; Oley Creek

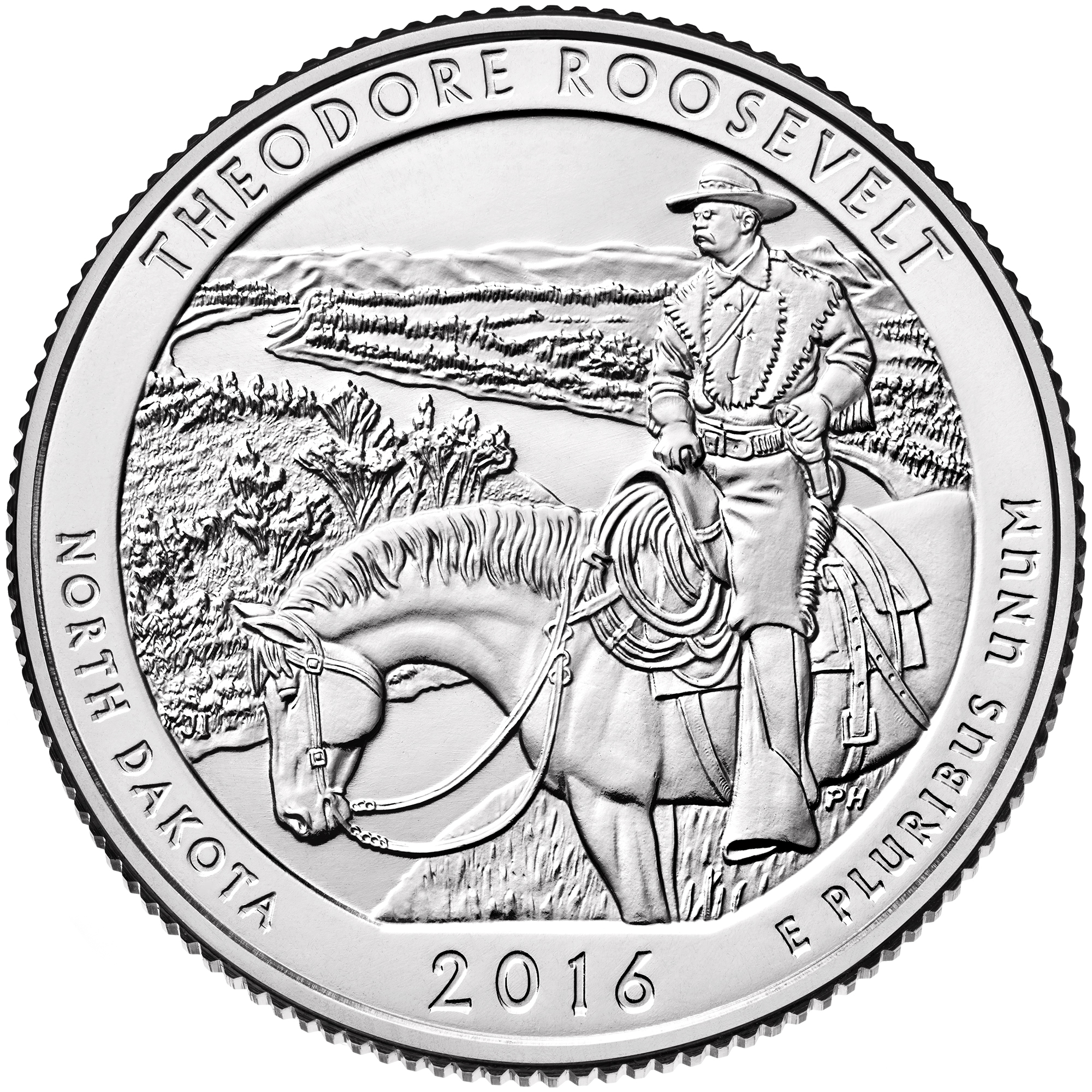
The river and the Theodore Roosevelt National Park appear with Roosevelt on the reverse of the 2016 America the Beautiful quarter.

The Little Missouri River is a tributary of the Missouri River, 560 miles (900 km) long, in the northern Great Plains of the United States. Rising in northeastern Wyoming, in western Crook County about 15 miles (24 km) west of Devils Tower, it flows northeastward, across a corner of southeastern Montana, and into South Dakota. In South Dakota, it flows northward through the Badlands into North Dakota, crossing the Little Missouri National Grassland and all three units of Theodore Roosevelt National Park. In the north unit of the park, it turns eastward and flows into the Missouri in Dunn County at Lake Sakakawea, where it forms an arm of the reservoir 30 miles (48 km) long called Little Missouri Bay and joins the main channel of the Missouri about 25 miles (40 km) northeast of Killdeer.

The highly seasonal runoff from badlands and other treeless landscapes along the Little Missouri carries heavy loads of eroded sediment downstream. The sedimentary layers, which extend from the headwaters in Wyoming all the way to the mouth in North Dakota, vary in age, but most of the beds along the river belong to the Bullion Creek and Sentinel Butte formations, both deposited during the Paleocene (about 66 to 56 million years ago). The deposits include siltstone, claystone, sandstone, and lignite coal laid down in a coastal plain during the Laramide orogeny.

== See also ==
- List of rivers of North Dakota
- List of longest rivers of the United States (by main stem)
- List of rivers of Montana
- List of rivers of South Dakota
- List of rivers of Wyoming
- Montana Stream Access Law
