= Killdeer, North Dakota =

- City
- Logo

- Location of Killdeer, North Dakota
- Coordinates: 47°22′08″N 102°44′50″W
- Country: United States
- State: North Dakota
- County: Dunn
- Founded: 1914

Area
  - Total: 1.85 sq mi (4.80 km^{2})
  - Land: 1.85 sq mi (4.79 km^{2})
  - Water: 0.0039 sq mi (0.01 km^{2})
- Elevation: 2,238 ft (682 m)

Population (2020)
  - Total: 939
  - Estimate (2022): 906
  - Density: 507.8/sq mi (196.05/km^{2})
- Time zone: UTC-7 (Mountain (MST))
  - Summer (DST): UTC-6 (MDT)
- ZIP code: 58640
- Area code: 701
- FIPS code: 38-42700
- GNIS feature ID: 1036107
- Website: killdeer.com

Killdeer (Hidatsa: Cíìdadagi Arudíheesh, Where-Deer-Are-Killed) is a city in Dunn County, North Dakota, United States. The population was 939 at the 2020 census.

== History ==
Killdeer was founded in 1914 at the end of a Northern Pacific Railway branch line that began in Mandan. The name was taken from the nearby Killdeer Mountains.

== Geography ==
According to the United States Census Bureau, the city has a total area of 0.94 square miles (2.43 km^{2}), all land.

=== Climate ===
Climate data for Killdeer, North Dakota (1991–2020)
Month	Jan	Feb	Mar	Apr	May	Jun	Jul	Aug	Sep	Oct	Nov	Dec	Year
Mean daily maximum °F (°C)	26.6 (−3.0)	30.2 (−1.0)	42.1 (5.6)	55.5 (13.1)	66.8 (19.3)	75.7 (24.3)	83.3 (28.5)	83.5 (28.6)	73.1 (22.8)	56.4 (13.6)	41.2 (5.1)	29.8 (−1.2)	55.4 (13.0)
Daily mean °F (°C)	15.3 (−9.3)	18.8 (−7.3)	29.8 (−1.2)	41.6 (5.3)	53.0 (11.7)	62.3 (16.8)	68.9 (20.5)	67.9 (19.9)	58.1 (14.5)	43.5 (6.4)	29.6 (−1.3)	19.0 (−7.2)	42.3 (5.7)
Mean daily minimum °F (°C)	4.0 (−15.6)	7.4 (−13.7)	17.6 (−8.0)	27.7 (−2.4)	39.2 (4.0)	48.8 (9.3)	54.4 (12.4)	52.4 (11.3)	43.0 (6.1)	30.6 (−0.8)	18.1 (−7.7)	8.3 (−13.2)	29.3 (−1.5)
Average precipitation inches (mm)	0.50 (13)	0.36 (9.1)	0.67 (17)	1.29 (33)	2.81 (71)	3.37 (86)	2.92 (74)	1.90 (48)	1.88 (48)	1.29 (33)	0.66 (17)	0.49 (12)	18.14 (461.1)
Average snowfall inches (cm)	6.7 (17)	5.8 (15)	6.7 (17)	4.9 (12)	1.3 (3.3)	0.0 (0.0)	0.0 (0.0)	0.0 (0.0)	0.0 (0.0)	1.8 (4.6)	4.8 (12)	7.2 (18)	39.2 (98.9)
Source: NOAA

== Demographics ==
Historical population
Census	Pop.	Note	%±
1920	512		—
1930	495		−3.3%
1940	650		31.3%
1950	698		7.4%
1960	765		9.6%
1970	615		−19.6%
1980	790		28.5%
1990	722		−8.6%
2000	713		−1.2%
2010	751		5.3%
2020	939		25.0%
2022 (est.)	906		−3.5%
U.S. Decennial Census; 2020 Census

=== 2010 census ===
As of the census of 2010, there were 751 people, 310 households, and 190 families residing in the city. The population density was 798.9 inhabitants per square mile (308.5/km^{2}). There were 342 housing units at an average density of 363.8 per square mile (140.5/km^{2}). The racial makeup of the city was 93.3% White, 0.1% African American, 3.6% Native American, 0.4% Asian, 0.1% from other races, and 2.4% from two or more races. Hispanic or Latino of any race were 0.9% of the population.

There were 310 households, of which 26.5% had children under the age of 18 living with them, 49.0% were married couples living together, 9.4% had a female householder with no husband present, 2.9% had a male householder with no wife present, and 38.7% were non-families. 33.2% of all households were made up of individuals, and 14.2% had someone living alone who was 65 years of age or older. The average household size was 2.25 and the average family size was 2.87.

The median age in the city was 45.8 years. 20.9% of residents were under the age of 18; 5.3% were between the ages of 18 and 24; 23% were from 25 to 44; 27.6% were from 45 to 64; and 23.4% were 65 years of age or older. The gender makeup of the city was 49.9% male and 50.1% female.

=== 2000 census ===
As of the census of 2000, there were 713 people, 297 households, and 182 families residing in the city. The population density was 752.7 inhabitants per square mile (290.6/km^{2}). There were 351 housing units at an average density of 370.6 per square mile (143.1/km^{2}). The racial makeup of the city was 93.97% White, 4.91% Native American, 0.14% Asian, and 0.98% from two or more races. Hispanic or Latino of any race were 0.70% of the population.

There were 297 households, out of which 28.3% had children under the age of 18 living with them, 50.8% were married couples living together, 8.1% had a female householder with no husband present, and 38.4% were non-families. 36.4% of all households were made up of individuals, and 22.6% had someone living alone who was 65 years of age or older. The average household size was 2.22 and the average family size was 2.91.

In the city, the population was spread out, with 24.1% under the age of 18, 5.2% from 18 to 24, 23.0% from 25 to 44, 22.0% from 45 to 64, and 25.7% who were 65 years of age or older. The median age was 43 years. For every 100 females, there were 82.4 males. For every 100 females age 18 and over, there were 78.5 males.

The median income for a household in the city was $32,750, and the median income for a family was $40,341. Males had a median income of $34,583 versus $20,208 for females. The per capita income for the city was $17,173. About 10.0% of families and 12.8% of the population were below the poverty line, including 12.2% of those under age 18 and 17.4% of those age 65 or over.

== Education ==
It is zoned to the Killdeer School District.

== Climate ==
This climatic region is typified by large seasonal temperature differences, with warm to hot (and often humid) summers and cold (sometimes severely cold) winters. According to the Köppen Climate Classification system, Killdeer has a humid continental climate, abbreviated "Dfb" on climate maps.
