= Index of North Dakota–related articles =

The location of the state of North Dakota in the United States of America

The following is an alphabetical list of articles related to the U.S. state of North Dakota.

== 0–9 ==
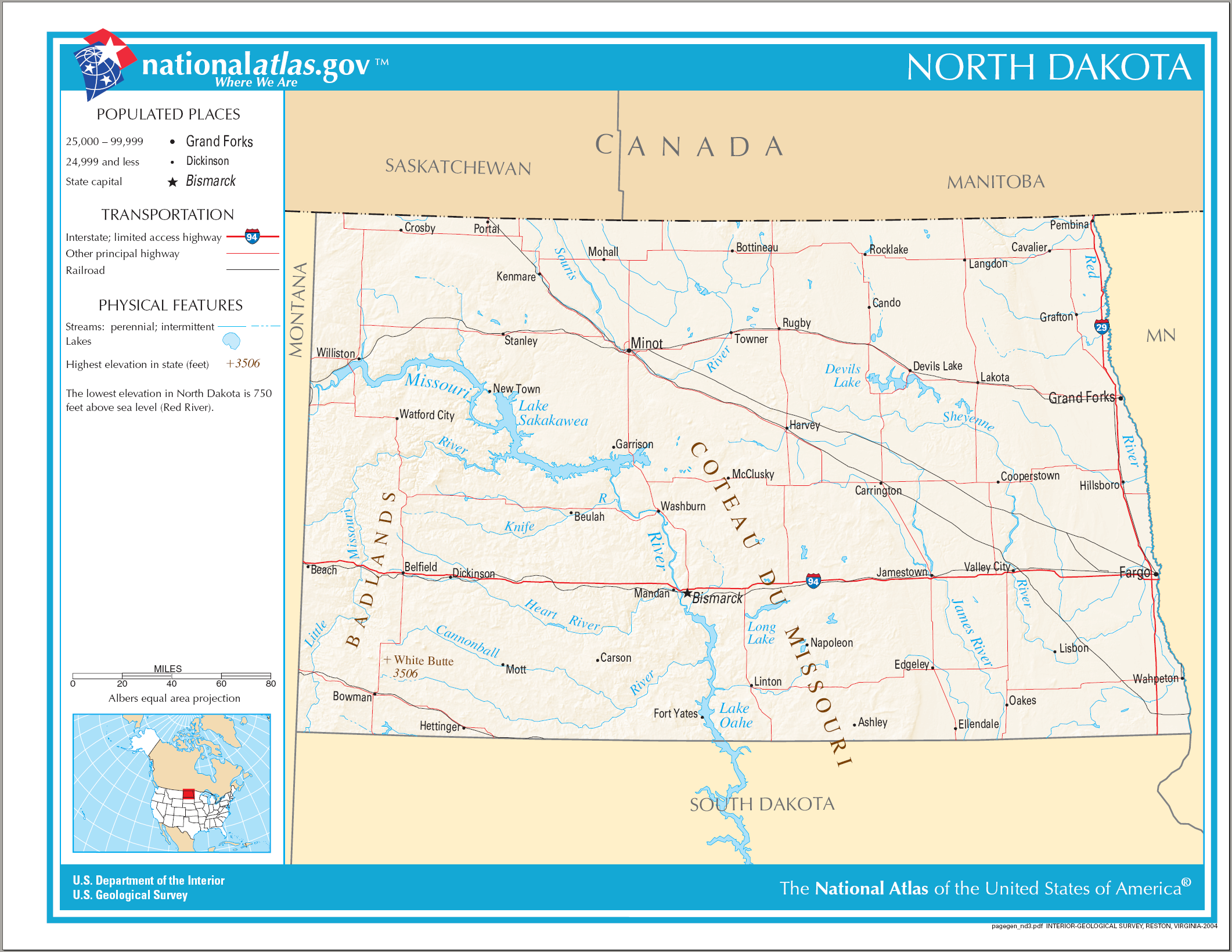
An enlargeable map of the state of North Dakota

- .nd.us – Internet second-level domain for the state of North Dakota
- 39th state to join the United States of America

== A ==
- Adams County, North Dakota
- Adjacent states and provinces:
  - Province of Manitoba
  - Province of Saskatchewan
  - State of Minnesota
  - State of Montana
  - State of South Dakota
- Agriculture in North Dakota
- Airports in North Dakota
- Arboreta in North Dakota
  - commons:Category:Arboreta in North Dakota
- Archaeology of North Dakota
  - Category:Archaeological sites in North Dakota
    - commons:Category:Archaeological sites in North Dakota
- Architecture of North Dakota
- Area codes in North Dakota
- Art museums and galleries in North Dakota
  - commons:Category:Art museums and galleries in North Dakota
- Attorney General of the State of North Dakota

== B ==
- Barnes County, North Dakota
- Battle of Big Mound
- Battle of Dead Buffalo Lake
- Battle of Grand Coteau (North Dakota)
- Battle of Killdeer Mountain
- Battle of Stony Lake
- Battle of the Badlands
- Battle of Whitestone Hill
- Benson County, North Dakota
- Billings County, North Dakota
- Bismarck, capital of the Territory of Dakota 1883-1889 and capital of the State of North Dakota since 1889
- Botanical gardens in North Dakota
  - commons:Category:Botanical gardens in North Dakota
- Bottineau County, North Dakota
- Bowman County, North Dakota
- Buildings and structures in North Dakota
  - commons:Category:Buildings and structures in North Dakota
- Burke County, North Dakota
- Burleigh County, North Dakota

== C ==
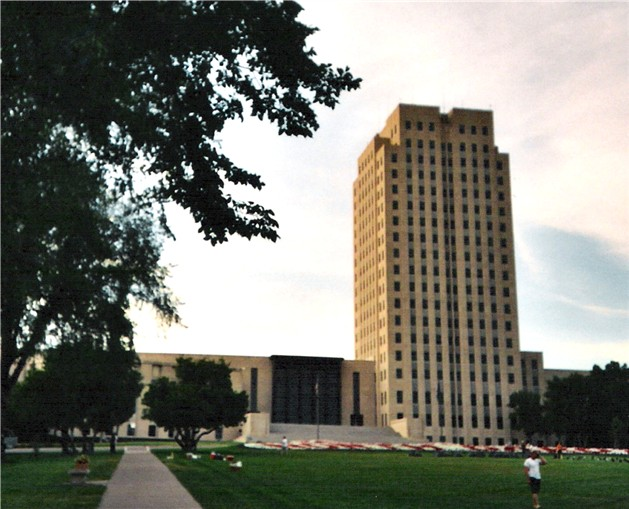
The North Dakota State Capitol in Bismarck

The Coat of Arms of the State of North Dakota

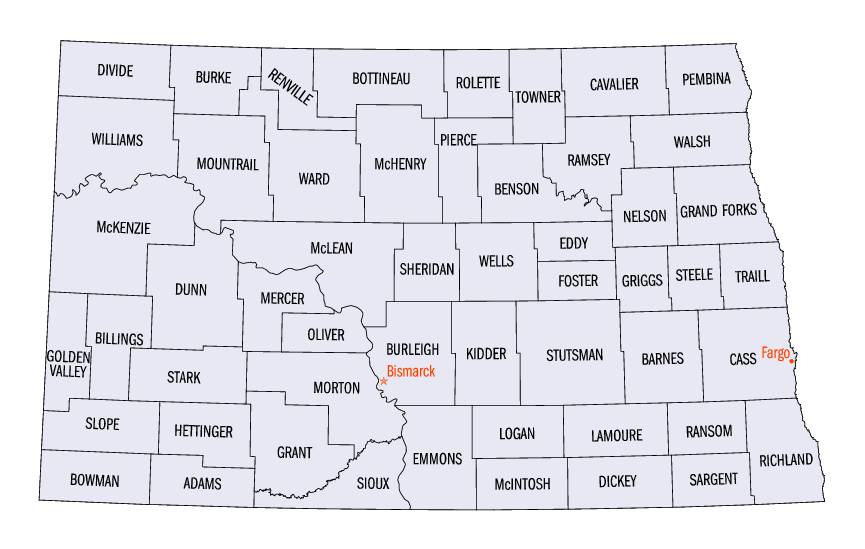
An enlargeable map of the 53 counties of the State of North Dakota

- Capital of the State of North Dakota
- Capitol of the State of North Dakota
  - commons:Category:North Dakota State Capitol
- Casinos in North Dakota
- Cass County, North Dakota
- Cavalier County, North Dakota
- Census statistical areas of North Dakota
- Cities in North Dakota
  - commons:Category:Cities in North Dakota
- Climate of North Dakota
  - Category:Climate of North Dakota
    - commons:Category:Climate of North Dakota
- Coat of Arms of the State of North Dakota
- Colleges and universities in North Dakota
  - commons:Category:Universities and colleges in North Dakota
- Communications in North Dakota
  - commons:Category:Communications in North Dakota
- Companies in North Dakota
  - Category:Companies based in North Dakota
- Congressional districts of North Dakota
- Constitution of the State of North Dakota
- Convention centers in North Dakota
  - commons:Category:Convention centers in North Dakota
- Counties of the State of North Dakota
  - commons:Category:Counties in North Dakota
- Cuisine of North Dakota
- Culture of North Dakota
  - Category:Culture of North Dakota
    - commons:Category:North Dakota culture

== D ==
- Demographics of North Dakota
- Dickey County, North Dakota
- Divide County, North Dakota
- Dunn County, North Dakota

== E ==
- Economy of North Dakota
  - Category:Economy of North Dakota
    - commons:Category:Economy of North Dakota
- Eddy County, North Dakota
- Education in North Dakota
  - Category:Education in North Dakota
    - commons:Category:Education in North Dakota
- Category:Elections in North Dakota
  - commons:Category:Elections in North Dakota
- Emmons County, North Dakota
- Environment of North Dakota
  - commons:Category:Environment of North Dakota

== F ==
The Flag of the State of North Dakota

- Fargo, North Dakota
- Festivals in North Dakota
  - commons:Category:Festivals in North Dakota
- Flag of the State of North Dakota
- Forts in North Dakota
  - Category:Forts in North Dakota
    - commons:Category:Forts in North Dakota
- Foster County, North Dakota

== G ==
The Great Seal of the State of North Dakota

- Geography of North Dakota
  - Category:Geography of North Dakota
    - commons:Category:Geography of North Dakota
- Geology of North Dakota
  - commons:Category:Geology of North Dakota
- Ghost towns in North Dakota
  - Category:Ghost towns in North Dakota
    - commons:Category:Ghost towns in North Dakota
- Golden Valley County, North Dakota
- Golf clubs and courses in North Dakota
- Government of the State of North Dakota website
  - Category:Government of North Dakota
    - commons:Category:Government of North Dakota
- Governor of the State of North Dakota
  - List of governors of North Dakota
- Grand Forks County, North Dakota
- Grant County, North Dakota
- Great Seal of the State of North Dakota
- Griggs County, North Dakota

== H ==
- Hettinger County, North Dakota
- High schools of North Dakota
- Higher education in North Dakota
- Highway Patrol of North Dakota
- Highway routes in North Dakota
- Hiking trails in North Dakota
  - commons:Category:Hiking trails in North Dakota
- History of North Dakota
  - Historical outline of North Dakota
- Hospitals in North Dakota
- House of Representatives of the State of North Dakota

== I ==
- Images of North Dakota
  - commons:Category:North Dakota

== K ==
- Kidder County, North Dakota

== L ==
- Lakes of North Dakota
  - commons:Category:Lakes of North Dakota
- LaMoure County, North Dakota
- Landmarks in North Dakota
  - commons:Category:Landmarks in North Dakota
- LGBT history in North Dakota
- Lieutenant Governor of the State of North Dakota
- Lists related to the State of North Dakota:
  - List of airports in North Dakota
  - List of cemeteries in North Dakota
  - List of census statistical areas in North Dakota
  - List of cities in North Dakota
  - List of colleges and universities in North Dakota
  - List of companies in North Dakota
  - List of United States congressional districts in North Dakota
  - List of counties in North Dakota
  - List of dams and reservoirs in North Dakota
  - List of forts in North Dakota
  - List of ghost towns in North Dakota
  - List of governors of North Dakota
  - List of high schools in North Dakota
  - List of highway routes in North Dakota
  - List of hospitals in North Dakota
  - List of lakes in North Dakota
  - List of law enforcement agencies in North Dakota
  - List of lieutenant governors of North Dakota
  - List of museums in North Dakota
  - List of National Historic Landmarks in North Dakota
  - List of newspapers in North Dakota
  - List of people from North Dakota
  - List of power stations in North Dakota
  - List of radio stations in North Dakota
  - List of railroads in North Dakota
  - List of Registered Historic Places in North Dakota
  - List of rivers of North Dakota
  - List of school districts in North Dakota
  - List of state parks in North Dakota
  - List of state prisons in North Dakota
  - List of symbols of the State of North Dakota
  - List of telephone area codes in North Dakota
  - List of television stations in North Dakota
  - List of North Dakota's congressional delegations
  - List of United States congressional districts in North Dakota
  - List of United States representatives from North Dakota
  - List of United States senators from North Dakota
- Logan County, North Dakota
- Louisiana Purchase of 1803

== M ==
- Maps of North Dakota
  - commons:Category:Maps of North Dakota
- Mass media in North Dakota
- McHenry County, North Dakota
- McIntosh County, North Dakota
- McKenzie County, North Dakota
- McLean County, North Dakota
- Mercer County, North Dakota
- Missouri River
- Morton County, North Dakota
- Mountains of North Dakota
  - commons:Category:Mountains of North Dakota
- Mountrail County, North Dakota
- Museums in North Dakota
  - Category:Museums in North Dakota
  - commons:Category:Museums in North Dakota
- Music of North Dakota
  - commons:Category:Music of North Dakota
  - Category:Musical groups from North Dakota
  - Category:Musicians from North Dakota

== N ==
- Natural gas pipelines North Dakota
- Natural history of North Dakota
  - commons:Category:Natural history of North Dakota
- ND – United States Postal Service postal code for the State of North Dakota
- Nelson County, North Dakota
- Newspapers of North Dakota
- North Dakota website
  - Category:North Dakota
    - commons:Category:North Dakota
      - commons:Category:Maps of North Dakota
- North Dakota Association of Counties
- North Dakota Highway Patrol
- North Dakota pottery
- North Dakota Royal Rangers
- North Dakota State Capitol
- North Dakota State University Press
- North Dakota Workforce Safety and Insurance

== O ==
- Oil pipelines North Dakota
- Oliver County, North Dakota

== P ==
- Pembina County, North Dakota
- People from North Dakota
  - Category:People from North Dakota
    - commons:Category:People from North Dakota
    - Category:People from North Dakota by populated place
    - Category:People from North Dakota by county
    - Category:People from North Dakota by occupation
- Pierce County, North Dakota
- Politics of North Dakota
  - Category:Politics of North Dakota
    - commons:Category:Politics of North Dakota
- Protected areas of North Dakota
  - commons:Category:Protected areas of North Dakota

== R ==
- Radio stations in North Dakota
- Railroads in North Dakota
- Ramsey County, North Dakota
- Ransom County, North Dakota
- Registered historic places in North Dakota
  - commons:Category:Registered Historic Places in North Dakota
- Renville County, North Dakota
- Religion in North Dakota
  - Category:Religion in North Dakota
    - commons:Category:Religion in North Dakota
- Richland County, North Dakota
- Rivers of North Dakota
  - Missouri River
  - Red River of the North
  - commons:Category:Rivers of North Dakota
- Rolette County, North Dakota

== S ==
- Sam McQuade Sr. softball tournament
- Sargent County, North Dakota
- School districts of North Dakota
- Scouting in North Dakota
- Secretary of the State of North Dakota
- Senate of the State of North Dakota
- Settlements in North Dakota
  - Cities in North Dakota
  - Townships in North Dakota
  - Census Designated Places in North Dakota
  - Other unincorporated communities in North Dakota
  - List of ghost towns in North Dakota
- Sheridan County, North Dakota
- Sioux County, North Dakota
- Ski areas and resorts in North Dakota
  - commons:Category:Ski areas and resorts in North Dakota
- Slope County, North Dakota
- Solar power in North Dakota
- South East Multi-County Agency Narcotics Task Force (North Dakota)
- Sports in North Dakota
  - commons:Category:Sports in North Dakota
- Sports venues in North Dakota
  - commons:Category:Sports venues in North Dakota
- SS Flickertail State
- Stark County, North Dakota
- State Capitol of North Dakota
- State of North Dakota website
  - Constitution of the State of North Dakota
  - Government of the State of North Dakota
    - Category:Government of North Dakota
      - commons:Category:Government of North Dakota
  - Executive branch of the government of the State of North Dakota
    - Governor of the State of North Dakota
  - Legislative branch of the government of the State of North Dakota
    - Legislature of the State of North Dakota
      - Senate of the State of North Dakota
      - House of Representatives of the State of North Dakota
  - Judicial branch of the government of the State of North Dakota
    - Supreme Court of the State of North Dakota
- State parks of North Dakota
  - commons:Category:State parks of North Dakota
- State police of North Dakota
- State prisons of North Dakota
- Steele County, North Dakota
- Structures in North Dakota
  - commons:Category:Buildings and structures in North Dakota*Supreme Court of the State of North Dakota
- Stutsman County, North Dakota
- Symbols of the State of North Dakota
  - Category:Symbols of North Dakota
    - commons:Category:Symbols of North Dakota

== T ==
- Telecommunications in North Dakota
  - commons:Category:Communications in North Dakota
- Telephone area codes in North Dakota
- Television stations in North Dakota
- Territory of Dakota, 1861–1889
- Territory of Iowa, 1838–1846
- Territory of Louisiana, 1805–1812
- Territory of Michigan, 1805-(1834–1836)-1837
- Territory of Minnesota, 1849–1858
- Territory of Missouri, 1812–1821
- Territory of Nebraska, (1854–1861)-1867
- Territory of Wisconsin, 1836-(1838)-1848
- Theatres in North Dakota
  - commons:Category:Theatres in North Dakota
- Tourism in North Dakota website
  - commons:Category:Tourism in North Dakota
- Towner County, North Dakota
- Traill County, North Dakota
- Transportation in North Dakota
  - Category:Transportation in North Dakota
    - commons:Category:Transport in North Dakota

== U ==
- United States of America
  - States of the United States of America
  - United States census statistical areas of North Dakota
  - North Dakota's congressional delegations
  - United States congressional districts in North Dakota
  - United States Court of Appeals for the Eighth Circuit
  - United States District Court for the District of North Dakota
  - United States representatives from North Dakota
  - United States senators from North Dakota
- Universities and colleges in North Dakota
  - commons:Category:Universities and colleges in North Dakota
- US-ND – ISO 3166-2:US region code for the State of North Dakota
- USS North Dakota

== W ==
- Walsh County, North Dakota
- Ward County, North Dakota
- Wells County, North Dakota
  Wikimedia
  - Wikimedia Commons:Category:North Dakota
    - commons:Category:Maps of North Dakota
  - Wikinews:Category:North Dakota
    - Wikinews:Portal:North Dakota
  - Wikipedia Category:North Dakota
    - Wikipedia:WikiProject North Dakota
      - Category:WikiProject North Dakota articles
      - Category:WikiProject North Dakota participants
- Williams County, North Dakota
- Wind power in North Dakota

== Z ==
- Zoos in North Dakota
  - commons:Category:Zoos in North Dakota

== See also ==
- Topic overview:
  - North Dakota
  - Outline of North Dakota
