= Outline of North Dakota =

U.S. state

The flag of North Dakota

The seal of North Dakota

The location of the state of North Dakota in the United States of America

The following outline is provided as an overview of and topical guide to the U.S. state of North Dakota:

North Dakota – 39th state of the United States, having been admitted to the union on November 2, 1889. The state capital is Bismarck, and the most populous city is Fargo. North Dakota is the 19th most extensive, but the 4th least populous, and the 4th least densely populated of the 50 U.S. states.

== General reference ==
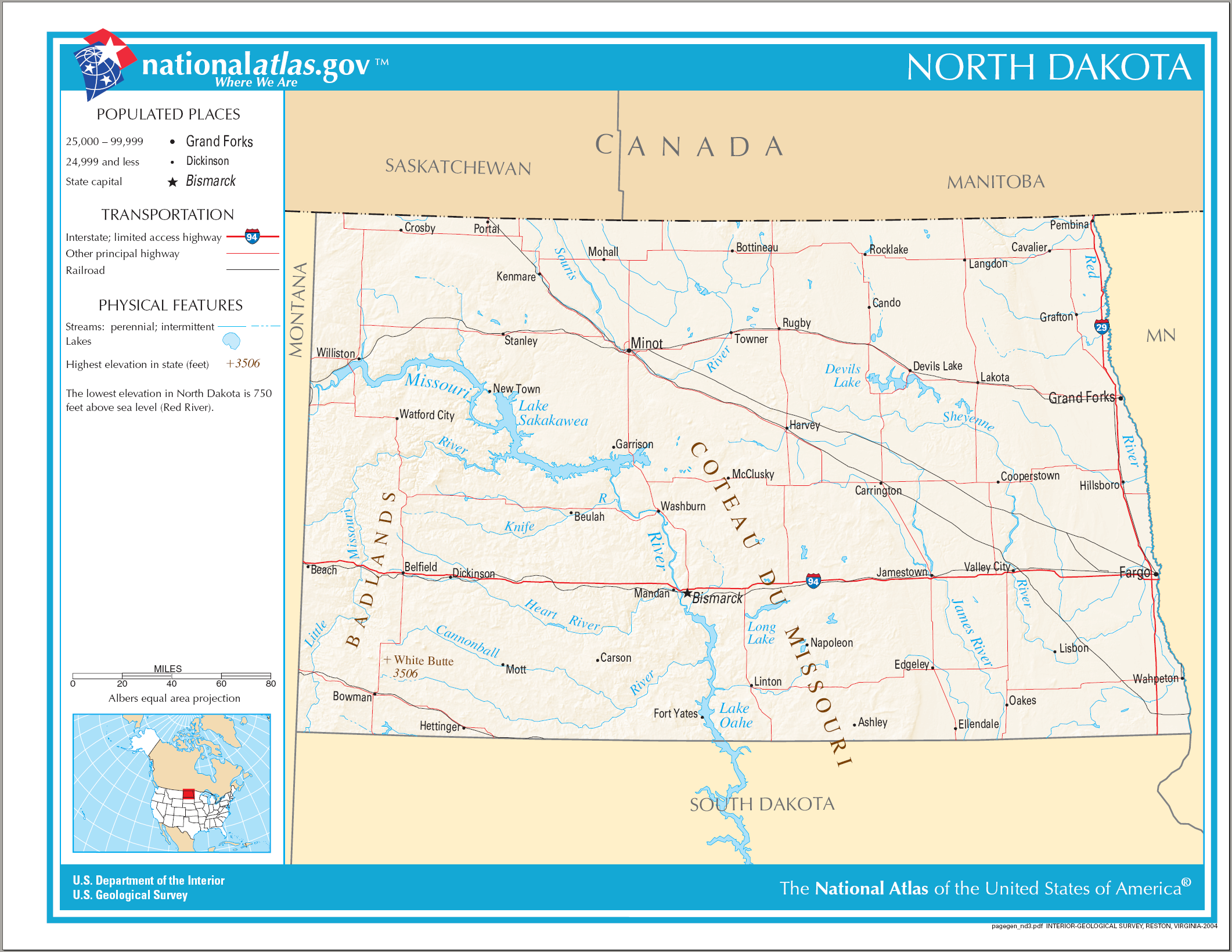
An enlargeable map of the state of North Dakota

- Names
  - Common name: North Dakota
    - Pronunciation: /dəˈkoʊtə/
  - Official name: State of North Dakota
  - Abbreviations and name codes
    - Postal symbol: ND
    - ISO 3166-2 code: US-ND
    - Internet second-level domain: .nd.us
  - Nicknames
    - Flickertail State
    - Peace Garden State (currently used on license plates)
    - Rough Rider State
    - Sioux State
- Adjectivals: North Dakota, North Dakotan
- Demonym: North Dakotan

== Geography of North Dakota ==
Geography of North Dakota

- North Dakota is: a U.S. state, a federal state of the United States of America
- Location
  - Northern Hemisphere
  - Western Hemisphere
    - Americas
      - North America
        - Anglo America
        - Northern America
          - United States of America
            - Contiguous United States
              - Canada–US border
              - Central United States
                - West North Central States
                  - The Dakotas
              - Midwestern United States
          - Great Plains
- Population of North Dakota: 672,591 (2010 U.S. Census)
- Area of North Dakota: 70,705 sq mi (183,125 km^{2})
- Atlas of North Dakota

=== Places in North Dakota ===
- List of cemeteries in North Dakota
- Historic places in North Dakota
  - National Historic Landmarks in North Dakota
  - National Register of Historic Places listings in North Dakota
    - Bridges on the National Register of Historic Places in North Dakota
- National Natural Landmarks in North Dakota
- National parks in North Dakota
- State parks in North Dakota

=== Environment of North Dakota ===
- Climate of North Dakota
- Superfund sites in North Dakota
- Wildlife of North Dakota
  - Fauna of North Dakota
    - Birds of North Dakota

==== Natural geographic features of North Dakota ====
- Rivers of North Dakota

=== Regions of North Dakota ===
==== Administrative divisions of North Dakota ====
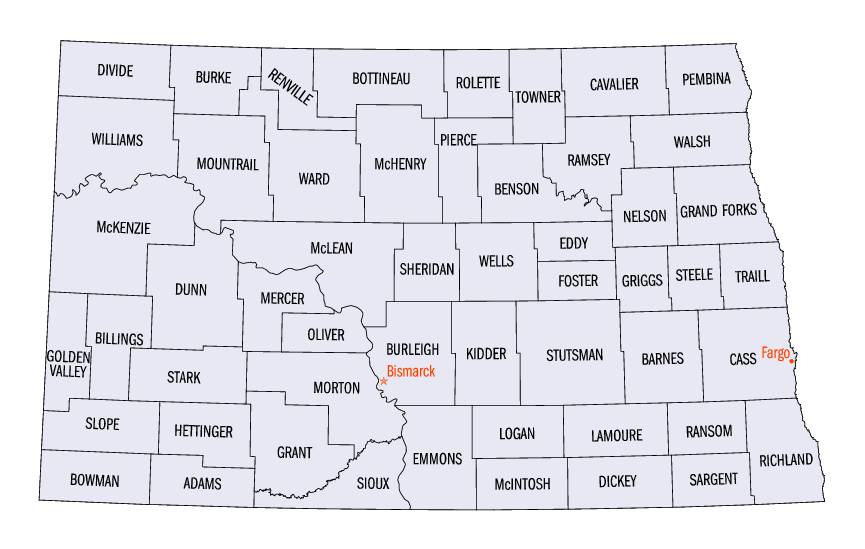
An enlargeable map of the 53 counties of the state of North Dakota

- The 53 counties of the state of North Dakota
  - Municipalities in North Dakota
    - Cities in North Dakota
      - State capital of North Dakota: Bismarck
      - Largest city in North Dakota: Fargo
      - City nicknames in North Dakota
  - List of townships in North Dakota

=== Demography of North Dakota ===
Demographics of North Dakota

== Government and politics of North Dakota ==
Politics of North Dakota

- Form of government: U.S. state government
- North Dakota's congressional delegations
- North Dakota State Capitol
- Elections in North Dakota
  - Electoral reform in North Dakota
- Political party strength in North Dakota
- North Dakota Association of Counties

=== Branches of the government of North Dakota ===
Government of North Dakota

==== Executive branch of the government of North Dakota ====
- Governor of North Dakota
  - Lieutenant Governor of North Dakota
  - Secretary of State of North Dakota
  - State Treasurer of North Dakota
- State departments
  - North Dakota Department of Transportation

==== Legislative branch of the government of North Dakota ====
- North Dakota Legislative Assembly (bicameral)
  - Upper house: North Dakota Senate
  - Lower house: North Dakota House of Representatives

==== Judicial branch of the government of North Dakota ====
Courts of North Dakota

- Supreme Court of North Dakota

=== Law and order in North Dakota ===
Law of North Dakota

- Cannabis in North Dakota
- Capital punishment in North Dakota – See Capital punishment in the United States
- Constitution of North Dakota
- Crime in North Dakota
- Gun laws in North Dakota
- Law enforcement in North Dakota
  - Law enforcement agencies in North Dakota

=== Military in North Dakota ===
- North Dakota Air National Guard
- North Dakota Army National Guard

== History of North Dakota ==
- History of North Dakota
- Founding dates of North Dakota incorporated cities

=== History of North Dakota, by period ===
The location of the state of North Dakota in the United States of America

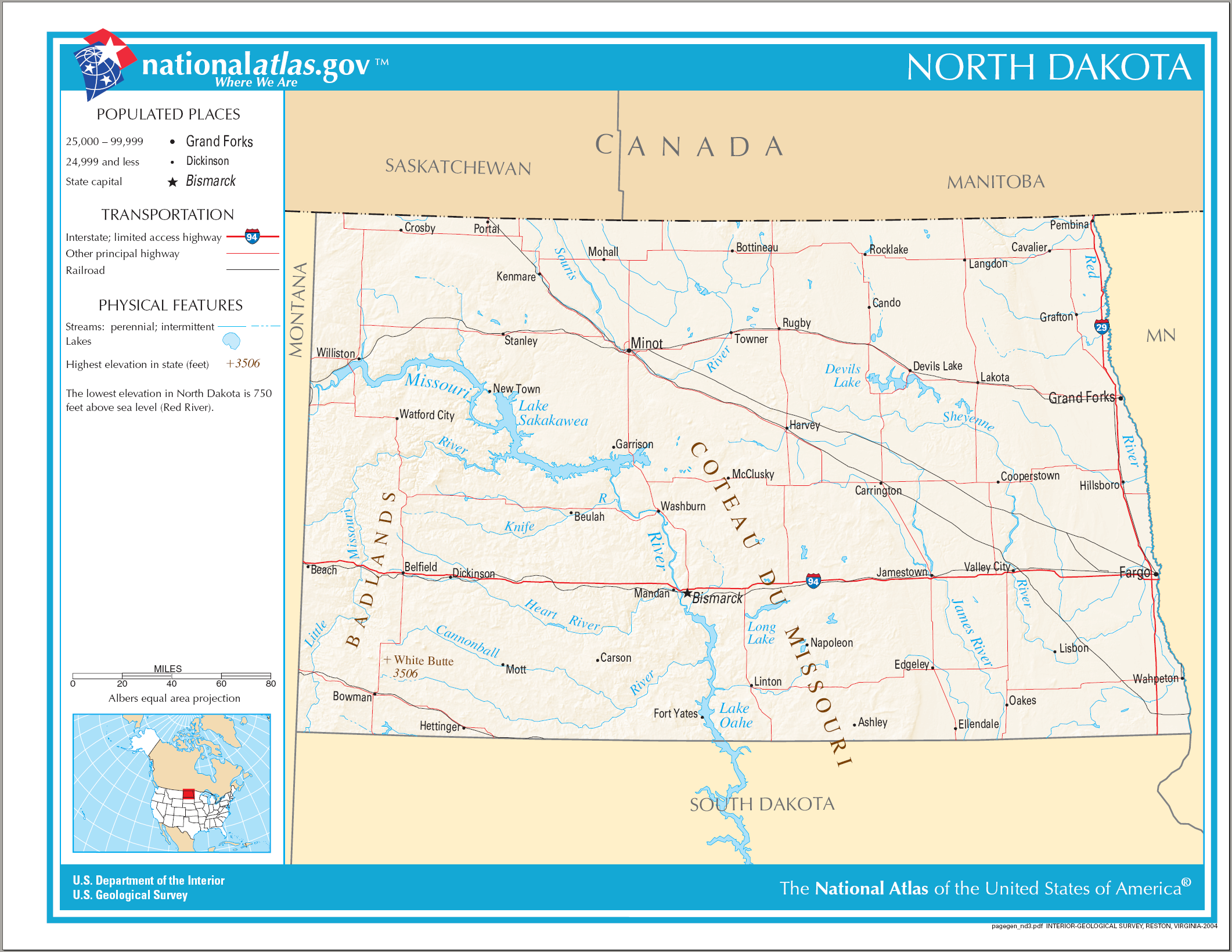
An enlargeable map of the state of North Dakota

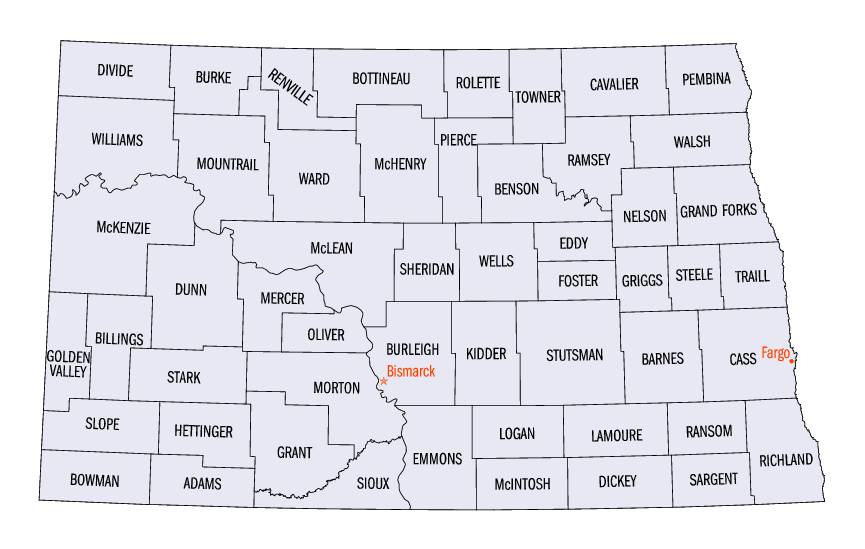
An enlargeable map of the 53 counties of the state of North Dakota

- Indigenous peoples
- English territory of Rupert's Land, 1670–1707
- French colony of Louisiane, 1699–1764
  - Treaty of Fontainebleau of 1762
- British territory of Rupert's Land, (1707–1818)-1870
- Spanish (though predominantly Francophone) district of Alta Luisiana, 1764–1803
  - Third Treaty of San Ildefonso of 1800
- French district of Haute-Louisiane, 1803
  - Louisiana Purchase of 1803
- Unorganized U.S. territory created by the Louisiana Purchase, 1803–1804
  - Lewis and Clark Expedition, 1804–1806
- District of Louisiana, 1804–1805
- Territory of Louisiana, 1805–1812
- Territory of Missouri, 1812–1821
  - War of 1812, June 18, 1812 – March 23, 1815
    - Treaty of Ghent, December 24, 1814
  - Anglo-American Convention of 1818
- Unorganized Territory, 1821–1854
  - Mexican–American War, April 25, 1846 – February 2, 1848
  - Treaty of Fort Laramie of 1851
- Territory of Michigan east of Missouri River and White Earth River, 1805-(1834–1836)-1837
- Territory of Wisconsin east of Missouri River and White Earth River, (1836–1838)-1848
- Territory of Iowa east of Missouri River and White Earth River, 1838–1846
- Territory of Minnesota east of Missouri River and White Earth River, 1849–1858
- Territory of Nebraska west of Missouri River or White Earth River, (1854–1861)-1867
- Territory of Dakota, 1861–1889
  - American Civil War, April 12, 1861 – May 13, 1865
    - Dakota in the American Civil War, 1861–1865
- State of North Dakota becomes 39th state admitted to the United States of America on November 2, 1889
- Theodore Roosevelt National Park designated on November 10, 1978

=== History of North Dakota, by region ===
==== By county ====
- History of Cass County
- History of Emmons County
- History of Stark County

==== By city ====
- History of Bismarck, North Dakota
- History of Grand Forks, North Dakota

=== History of North Dakota, by subject ===
- Political history of North Dakota
  - List of North Dakota state legislatures

== Culture of North Dakota ==
Culture of North Dakota

- Cuisine of North Dakota
- LGBT history in North Dakota
- Museums in North Dakota
- Religion in North Dakota
  - Episcopal Diocese of North Dakota
- Scouting in North Dakota
- State symbols of North Dakota
  - Flag of the state of North Dakota
  - Great Seal of the State of North Dakota

=== The arts in North Dakota ===
- Music of North Dakota

== Economy and infrastructure of North Dakota ==
Economy of North Dakota

- Agriculture in North Dakota
- Communications in North Dakota
  - Newspapers in North Dakota
  - Radio stations in North Dakota
  - Television stations in North Dakota
- Energy in North Dakota
  - Power stations in North Dakota
  - Solar power in North Dakota
  - Wind power in North Dakota
- Health care in North Dakota
  - Hospitals in North Dakota
- Mining in North Dakota
  - Coal in North Dakota
  - Petroleum in North Dakota
- Transportation in North Dakota
  - Airports in North Dakota

== Education in North Dakota ==
Education in North Dakota

- Schools in North Dakota
  - School districts in North Dakota
    - High schools in North Dakota
  - Colleges and universities in North Dakota
    - University of North Dakota
    - North Dakota State University

== See also ==
- Topic overview:
  - North Dakota
  - Index of North Dakota-related articles
