= List of North Dakota state symbols =

Symbols of the U.S. State of North Dakota

Location of the state of North Dakota in the United States of America

The following is a list of officially designated symbols of the U.S. state of North Dakota.

== State symbols ==
These symbols are defined in Title 54 of the North Dakota Century Code and appear in the North Dakota Blue Book:

State bird: Western meadowlark, Sturnella neglecta
State fish: Northern pike, Esox lucius
Honorary equine: Nokota horse
State flower: Wild prairie rose, Rosa arkansana
State tree: American elm, Ulmus americana
State fossil: Teredo petrified wood
State grass: Western wheatgrass, Pascopyrum smithii (formerly Agropyron smithii)
State nicknames: Roughrider State, Flickertail State, Peace Garden State
State mottos:

Motto: Liberty and Union Now and Forever, One and Inseparable
Latin motto: Serit ut alteri saeclo prosit (One sows for the benefit of another age)

State song: "North Dakota Hymn"
State dance: Square dance
State sport: Curling
State fruit: Chokecherry, Prunus virginiana
State march: "Flickertail March"
State beverage: Milk
State insect: Convergent lady beetle (ladybug), Hippodamia convergens
State seal: The Great Seal of North Dakota: "A tree in the open field, the trunk of which is surrounded by three bundles of wheat; on the right a plow, anvil and sledge; on the left, a bow crossed with three arrows, and an Indian on horseback pursuing a buffalo toward the setting sun; the foliage of the tree arched by a half circle of forty-two stars, surrounded by the motto "Liberty and Union Now and Forever, One and Inseparable"; the words Great Seal at the top; the words State of North Dakota at the bottom; October 1 on the left and 1889 on the right."
State coat of arms:

"Device: On an Indian arrowhead point to base or a bend vert charged with three mullets of the first, in base a fleur-de-lis of the second.
Crest: On a wreath or and azure, a sheaf of three arrows argent armed and flighted gules behind a stringed bow fessways or with grip of the second (gules)."

State waltz: "Dancing Dakota"
State vegetable: Rhubarb
State rock: Knife River flint
State tourism brand: "Be Legendary"
State art museum: North Dakota Museum of Art
State railroad museum: North Dakota State Railroad Museum, Mandan, North Dakota

== See also ==
- List of North Dakota-related topics
- Lists of United States state insignia
