= List of North Dakota railroads =

The following railroads operate in the U.S. state of North Dakota.

== Common freight carriers ==
- BNSF Railway (BNSF)
- CPKC Railway (Canadian Pacific Kansas City) through subsidiary Soo Line Railroad (SOO)
- Dakota, Missouri Valley and Western Railroad (DMVW)
- Dakota Northern Railroad (DN)
- Northern Plains Railroad (NPR)
  - Operates the Mohall Railroad and Mohall Central Railroad
- Red River Valley and Western Railroad (RRVW)
- Yellowstone Valley Railroad (YSVR)

== Private freight carriers ==
- Cenex Harvest States Cooperatives

== Passenger carriers ==
- Amtrak (AMTK)

== Defunct railroads ==
Name	Mark	System (Note: This is one or more of the Class I railroads that the railroad became part of, if any.)	From	To	Successor	Notes
Aberdeen, Bismarck and Northwestern Railway		CP	1887	1888	Minneapolis, St. Paul and Sault Ste. Marie Railway	
Bismarck, Washburn and Fort Buford Railway		CP	1889	1900	Bismarck, Washburn and Great Falls Railway	
Bismarck, Washburn and Great Falls Railway		CP	1900	1904	Minneapolis, St. Paul and Sault Ste. Marie Railway	
Brandon, Devils Lake and Southern Railway		GN	1905	1943	Great Northern Railway	
Burlington Northern Inc.	BN		1970	1981	Burlington Northern Railroad	
Burlington Northern Railroad	BN		1981	1996	Burlington Northern and Santa Fe Railway	
Casselton Branch Railroad		GN	1880	1883	St. Paul, Minneapolis and Manitoba Railway	
Chicago, Milwaukee and Puget Sound Railway		MILW	1909	1912	Chicago, Milwaukee and St. Paul Railway	
Chicago, Milwaukee and St. Paul Railway		MILW	1885	1928	Chicago, Milwaukee, St. Paul and Pacific Railroad	
Chicago, Milwaukee and St. Paul Railway of South Dakota		MILW	1906	1908	Chicago, Milwaukee and St. Paul Railway of Washington	
Chicago, Milwaukee and St. Paul Railway of Washington		MILW	1908	1909	Chicago, Milwaukee and Puget Sound Railway	
Chicago, Milwaukee, St. Paul and Pacific Railroad	MILW	MILW	1928	1982	Burlington Northern Railroad	
Chicago and North Western Railway	CNW	CNW	1879	1972	Chicago and North Western Transportation Company	
Chicago and North Western Transportation Company	CNW	CNW	1972	1986	Dakota, Minnesota and Eastern Railroad	
Dakota Central Railway		CNW	1879	1900	Winona and St. Peter Railroad	
Dakota and Great Northern Railway		GN	1900	1907	Great Northern Railway	
Dakota and Great Southern Railway		MILW	1883	1886	Chicago, St. Paul and Milwaukee Railway	
Dakota, Minnesota and Eastern Railroad	DME		1986	1991	Red River Valley and Western Railroad	
Devils Lake and Northern Railway		GN	1900	1902	Farmers' Grain and Shipping Company	
Duluth and Manitoba Railroad		NP	1885	1898	Northern Pacific Railway	
Duluth and Manitoba Railway		NP	1884	1885	Duluth and Manitoba Railroad	
Fairmount and Veblen Railway		CP	1912	1915	Minneapolis, St. Paul and Sault Ste. Marie Railway	
Fargo and Southern Railway		MILW	1881	1885	Chicago, Milwaukee and St. Paul Railway	
Fargo and Southwestern Railroad		NP	1881	1898	Northern Pacific Railway	
Farmers' Grain and Shipping Company	FG&S	GN	1902	1943	Great Northern Railway	
Great Northern Railway	GN	GN	1890	1970	Burlington Northern Inc.	
James River Valley Railroad		NP	1883	1898	Northern Pacific Railway	
Jamestown and Northern Railroad		NP	1881	1898	Northern Pacific Railway	
Jamestown and Northern Extension Railroad		NP	1889	1898	Northern Pacific Railway	
Midland Continental Railroad	MICO	CP/ NP	1903	1970	N/A	
Minneapolis and Pacific Railway		CP	1884	1888	Minneapolis, St. Paul and Sault Ste. Marie Railway	
Minneapolis, St. Paul and Sault Ste. Marie Railroad	SOO	CP	1944	1961	Soo Line Railroad	
Minneapolis, St. Paul and Sault Ste. Marie Railway	SOO	CP	1888	1944	Minneapolis, St. Paul and Sault Ste. Marie Railroad	
Missouri River Railway		NP	1906	1914	Northern Pacific Railway	
Montana Eastern Railway		GN	1912	1928	Great Northern Railway	
Northern Dakota Railway			1907	1922	N/A	
Northern Pacific Railroad		NP	1864	1896	Northern Pacific Railway	
Northern Pacific Railway	NP	NP	1896	1970	Burlington Northern Inc.	
Northern Pacific, Fergus and Black Hills Railroad		NP	1881	1898	Northern Pacific Railway	
Northern Pacific, La Moure and Missouri River Railroad		NP	1886	1898	Northern Pacific Railway	
Ordway, Bismarck and Northwestern Railway		CP	1883	1887	Aberdeen, Bismarck and Northwestern Railway	
Red River Valley and Western Railroad		GN	1893	1893	St. Paul, Minneapolis and Manitoba Railway	
St. Paul, Minneapolis and Manitoba Railway		GN	1879	1907	Great Northern Railway	
Sanborn, Coopertown and Turtle Mountain Railroad		NP	1882	1898	Northern Pacific Railway	
South-Eastern Dakota Railroad		NP	1886	1898	Northern Pacific Railway	
Western Dakota Railway		NP	1906	1914	Northern Pacific Railway	
Winona and St. Peter Railroad		CNW	1900	1900	Chicago and North Western Railway	

Electric

- Devils Lake and Chautauqua Railway
