= Seal of North Dakota =

Official government emblem of the U.S. state of North Dakota

Great Seal of the State of North Dakota

Versions
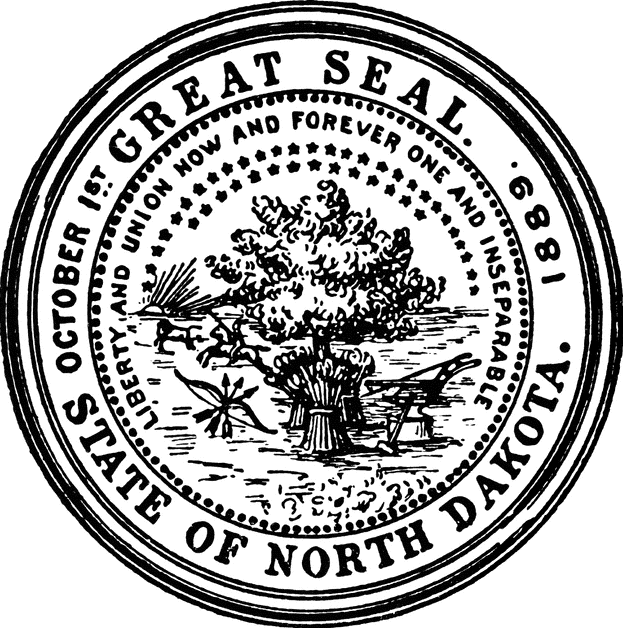
- Pre-1987 seal
- Armiger: State of North Dakota
- Adopted: 1987
- Motto: Liberty and Union Now and Forever, One and Inseparable
- Designer: Lili Stewart

The Great Seal of the State of North Dakota is the official seal of the U.S. state of North Dakota.

== Description ==
The seal is based on the description of the seal of the Territory of Dakota, enacted in 1862-3:

A tree in an open field, the trunk of which is surrounded by three bundles of wheat; on the right a plow, anvil and sledge; on the left, a bow crossed with three arrows, and an Indian on horseback pursuing a buffalo toward the setting sun; the foliage of the tree arched by a half circle of forty-two stars. It is surrounded by the motto "Liberty and Union Now and Forever, One and Inseparable", from Daniel Webster's Reply to Hayne; the words "Great Seal" at the top; "State of North Dakota" at the bottom; "October 1st" on the left and "1889" on the right.

The current description is found in Article XI, Section 2 of the Constitution of North Dakota.

The current seal was designed by Lili Stewart of North Dakota in 1987.

== See also ==
- Symbols of the State of North Dakota
- Coat of arms of North Dakota
- Flag of North Dakota
