= Bismarck, Washburn and Great Falls Railway =

Overview
- Headquarters: Bismarck, North Dakota
- Locale: North Dakota
- Dates of operation: 1899–1904
- Successor: Minneapolis, St. Paul and Sault Ste. Marie Railway

Technical
- Track gauge: 4 ft 8 1/2 in (1,435 mm) standard gauge
- Length: 58 miles (93 kilometres)

The Bismarck, Washburn and Great Falls Railway (BW&GF) was a railroad that was organized in North Dakota on May 12, 1899. Its offices were located in Bismarck, North Dakota.

== History ==
The BW&GF started as the Bismarck, Washburn & Fort Buford Railroad in 1889 by General William D. Washburn, a U.S. Senator and Surveyor-General from Minnesota. He was the main owner of the Washburn-Crosby Flour Mills. By 1903, the railroad ran from Bismarck to Washburn, a distance of 44.81 miles. In 1904, the road was extended to Underwood.

The railroad primarily carried passengers, mail, coal, and grain. It also included a steamboat operation.

In 1903, the railroad owned 3 steam engines, 2 passenger cars, 34 freight cars, and 1 caboose. In 1901, the BW&GF was one of the first US railroads to roster the Mikado 2-8-2 steam engine design.

The railroad was purchased by the Minneapolis, St. Paul and Sault Ste. Marie Railway in 1904.
