= North Dakota pottery =

Industry in North Dakota

North Dakota potteries
Common name	Production years
UND	1910 to present
Dickota	1934 to 1937
Turtle Mountain	1936 to c.1942
WPA	1936 to 1942
Rosemeade	1940 to 1961
Messer	1952 to 1956
Little Heart	1959 to 1968
Three Tribes	1967 to 1975

North Dakota in the United States has been the scene of modern era pottery production using North Dakota clays since the early 1900s. In 1892 a study was published by Earle Babcock, a chemistry instructor at the University of North Dakota (UND) that reported on the superior qualities of some of the North Dakota clays for pottery production. The UND School of Mines began operations in 1898 with Earle Babcock as director. With the assistance of several eastern potteries, pottery made from North Dakota clay was first displayed at the 1904 St. Louis World's Fair.

From this beginning, a Ceramics Department was founded at the University and a talented potter, Margaret Kelly Cable, was hired as its director. The university trained many of the people later involved in other pottery ventures within the state. These include Charles Grantier who worked at Dickinson Clay Products Company (Dickota) and later served as state director of the WPA Ceramics Project. Laura Taylor (Hughes) preceded Charles Grantier as state director at WPA and later became a partner in the Wahpeton Pottery Company (Rosemeade) which operated from 1940 until 1961. The WPA project was active first in Dickinson, North Dakota and then in Mandan, North Dakota from 1936 until 1942.

In addition to the above students trained in the regular ceramics program at UND, Mrs. Carey (Corbert) Grant, the arts and handicrafts instructor at the Turtle Mountain School at Belcourt, North Dakota completed a summer teacher training course at UND and began teaching students at the school to make pottery. The pottery made by the students was sold to customers throughout the United States. This operation lasted from 1936 until about 1942.

Other potteries that operated in the state by people not trained at the University were Ceramics by Messer which operated in Bowman, North Dakota from 1952 until 1956, Little Heart Ceramics which was part of L&H Manufacturing's accessories business which produced cattle figurines and specialty advertising items from 1959 until 1968, and Three Tribes Stoneware Inc which began as a training project on the Fort Berthhold Indian Reservation at New Town, North Dakota in 1967. This company produced contemporary Indian Stoneware until it closed in 1975.

== University of North Dakota ==
UND produced pottery for sale from the early 1900s and continues to the present day. Under the direction of Margaret Cable, native clays were tested, glazes perfected, and ceramics classes were instituted at the university.

"The School of Mines experimented with and developed many clays and glazes. Clays used included Dickinson, Beulah, Hebron, Mandan, Weigel, Red and Grey Ross, McCurdy, Hettinger, and bentonite. Much North Dakota pottery was made from a mix of Hettinger, Mandan, Red Ross, and Beulah clay. Bentonite clays, which fired to a rich burnt sienna color, were used primarily for pottery with Indian motifs. An advantage of bentonite was that it could have glazes applied to green ware and be finished in one firing." - Bob Barr

In 1910, a Ceramics Department was officially established at the University. Margaret Kelly Cable was hired to head this Department, a position she held for the next 39 years. Under her direction, native clays were tested, glazes perfected, and ceramics classes were instituted at UND. The University became the training ground for many of the potters that built an industry in the state in later years. Many talented instructors worked at the University at various times. Among them were Margaret's sister, Flora Cable Huckfield, Frieda Hammers, Margaret Pachl and Julia Mattson.

The cobalt blue "School of Mines" seal was used on UND pottery beginning in 1913. It was retired the year Julia Mattson retired in 1963. After 1963, only student or instructor names appear on UND pottery. Many of the UND pieces also bear a name or initial of the student or instructor responsible for the item. Others simply have an identification number of the mold used for that particular piece of pottery.

Some of the many UND products include vases of all types, dishes, tea sets, decorative tiles, candleholders, animal figurines, book ends, curtain pulls, and ashtrays among others. Advertising pieces were also made for groups such as the 4H Clubs, the American Legion, the Daughters of Norway and others.

== Dickinson Clay Products Company ==
Seeing a need for winter work at the Dickinson Clay Products Company, Howard Lewis started pottery production in 1934 to keep the plant running year round. In 1935 he was joined by Charles Grantier who had trained under Margaret Cable at the University of North Dakota and who was very familiar with the properties of North Dakota Clay. The pottery produced by this company was known as Dickota, usually scratched or incised on the bottom of the pottery pieces. In addition a gold and silver sticker with the Dickota name was placed on some items

Margaret Cable worked at Dickinson Clay Products in the summer of 1936 designing a dinnerware set which became known as "Cableware". Laura Taylor, another UND student also worked for the company for a short time.

Some of the items made by the company include vases, advertising ashtrays, pitchers, mugs, book ends, curtain shade pulls, animal figurines, cookie jars, salt and pepper shakers, sugars and creamers and tea pots. In addition to glazed clay products, Dickota Badlands pieces were produced. This process was brought to Dickota by Howard Lewis who learned the technique while working at Niloak. It consisted of several colors of clay swirled together in one product. (by Arley and Bonnie Olson)

Another popular item was the ball water pitcher and glasses patterned after Cambridge Glass. This led to legal problems for the company as Cambridge held the patent for the pitcher shape. Those legal problems and other economic issues led to the closing of the pottery operation in 1937.

== Turtle Mountain ==
North Dakota Pottery was also produced at the Turtle Mountain School at Belcourt, North Dakota from 1936 until about 1942. Mrs. Carey (Corbert) Grant, the arts and handicrafts instructor completed a teacher training course at UND and began teaching students at the school to make pottery. In 1937 this was expanded to an adult evening class. All of the steps in the pottery making process were done by hand beginning with digging and processing the clay through the final finishing operations.

Items such as plates, bowls, wall plaques, lamp bases, candle holders, ash trays, and novelty paper weights were made and sold throughout the United States.

== Works Progress Administration ceramics ==
WPA Logo

The Works Progress Administration (WPA) was a part of President Franklin D. Roosevelt's New Deal legislation. As a part of the WPA, the Federal Arts Project was intended to help professional artists, but also to train people to be able to make a living in the arts. In 1936, Laura Taylor, a University of North Dakota trained artist was appointed state director of the Federal Arts Project. Initially the location of the project was in Dickinson, North Dakota, later it was moved to Mandan, North Dakota.

In 1939 Miss Taylor performed wheel throwing demonstrations at the New York World's Fair. At that time Charles Grantier, another former University student became temporary director. He became permanent director when Laura Taylor decided to join with Robert. J Hughes to form the Wahpeton Pottery Company. He continued to direct the WPA project until it closed in 1942. After the move to Mandan, Margaret Cable and Frieda Hammers at the University assisted in the formulation of glazes suitable for use with the local Mandan clay.

WPA products included many utensils for the State school hot lunch programs. These include plates and bowls for eating as well as serving bowls, pitchers, etc. They also made hand thrown or molded items for various state institutions. Functional products include ashtrays, spoon holders, trivets, paperweights and salt and pepper shakers among other items. A popular series nursery rhyme characters was also produced including Humpty Dumpty, Old King Cole, Old Mother Hubbard, and others. These figurines were sent to North Dakota nursery schools for use as teaching aids.

Some WPA ceramics items are identified by a rubber ink stamp, WPA Ceramics N. Dak. Others were hand etched or incised. Pieces marked WPA and not identified by state, or not marked at all can not be attributed to the North Dakota project as several other states also had WPA Ceramics projects.

== Wahpeton Pottery Company (Rosemeade) ==
The Wahpeton Pottery Company was formed in 1940 by Robert J. Hughes, a local Wahpeton, North Dakota business man and Laura Taylor, a potter trained at the University of North Dakota. Mr. Hughes was the business manager of the Company and Laura Taylor provided the creative talent. The two were married in 1943. Laura was born in Rosemeade township in Ransom County, North Dakota and named the pottery after her birthplace.

The success of the business allowed a modern production plant to be built in 1944 and Howard Lewis, a ceramics engineer formerly with Dickinson Clay Products, became a partner and production manager. Initially, Rosemeade was marketed in the Midwest, but later expanded to all of the United States and many foreign countries.

Laura Hughes did the majority of the design work for the company. Her many animal figurines and salt and pepper designs used live animals as models, but she also worked from pictures, sketches and mounted animals. While there are wheel thrown vases, especially the swirl pieces, most of Rosemeade production was from plaster cast molds made from Laura's clay models.

Pheasants in many variations were probably the most popular sale item. "By 1953, more than 500,000 Rosemeade pheasants in 19 different designs had been sold." (Dommel, Dakota Potteries) Some other of the many figures were Quail, various song birds, fish, coyotes, American bison, rabbits and others were produced in the form of salt and peppers, figurines of various sizes, cup sitters, pins, paper weights and used as figurines on ash trays. Twelve different types of dog heads were designed in 1950 copied from illustrations in National Geographic magazine.

When Laura Taylor Hughes died of cancer in 1959 the company lost its primary designer. At the same time, competition from cheaper Japanese imports hurt the company sales. Production continued until 1961 and the sales room remained open until 1964 to sell the last of the production items.

Rosemeade pottery pieces are marked in several ways. The well known prairie rose sticker was placed on many of the pieces and also many were bottom stamped in various ways. These were not, however, used on all production pieces so are not a requirement to positively identify a Rosemeade piece.

== Ceramics by Messer ==
Another North Dakota native, Joe Messer studied ceramics and sculpture at the Kansas City Art Institute and then returned to his native Bowman, North Dakota and produced pottery for several years as Ceramics by Messer. Joe and his wife Eunice produced pottery in Bowman from 1952 until 1956.

Initially their production facility was half a chicken coop belonging to Eunice's father. They expanded to take over the whole building in 1953 and by 1954 moved into their own building, a former gas station in Bowman on a major road to the Black Hills.

Joe used his artistic skills to produce animal figurines as well as other landmark figurines. Especially popular were his figurines of his father-in-law's prize Hereford bull which local ranchers bought custom made with their own brands. Other figures include an oil derrick, a popular Devils Tower National Monument salt and pepper shaker set and salt and pepper sets of grain elevators advertising North Dakota towns.

Joe was also very talented at wheel throwing vases, jugs, etc. Local clay was used for these one-of-a-kind products. These items were marked as one-of-a-kind originals. Other Messer production pieces were marked or impressed on the bottom and some contained a "Ceramics by Messer" sticker on the side.

Competition from low cost Japanese pottery drove the Messers out of business in 1956.

== Little Heart ==
Tony Helbling, the owner and founder of L & H Manufacturing of Mandan, North Dakota, began Little Heart Ceramics in 1959 to produce ceramic figurines of cattle for his branding iron customers. Little Heart's main business consisted of these cattle figurines plus they produced specialty advertising items. A variety of items were produced; including figurines of animals, ashtrays, paperweights, vases, and salt and pepper shakers. Little Heart was fortunate to be able to purchase molds from the Messers when their operation ended. Especially useful to the company were the cattle molds in four different sizes. In addition, oil derricks, a coyote, and elevators were made from Messer molds. Little Heart ended operations in 1968.

== Three Tribes ==
Three Tribes Stoneware Inc began as a training project on the Fort Berthhold Indian Reservation at New Town, North Dakota in 1967. Jim Walker, a native of Wisconsin served as director. Three Tribes began as a training project for Indians at Fort Berthhold in 1966 and then used the potters that were trained there for production of modern stoneware. Emmaline Blake, Mary Elk, Sadie Young Bear and Elizabeth Morsette all were trained in the project and later worked for the company. Three Tribes Stoneware produced contemporary Indian Stoneware until it closed in 1975.

The stoneware produced by Three Tribes was marked on the bottom with an incised 3TS symbol.

== Collectability ==
All of the above pottery products have become highly collectible and are sought after by collectors throughout the United States.
