= USS North Dakota =

Two ships of the United States Navy have been named USS North Dakota in honor of the 39th state.

- USS North Dakota (BB-29) was a Delaware-class battleship that was commissioned on 11 April 1910, and participated in World War I.
- USS North Dakota (SSN-784) is a Virginia-class submarine that was commissioned in October 2014.

== See also ==
- SS Flickertail State, an auxiliary Gopher State-class crane ship launched in 1968 currently in ready reserve since 1993.
