= North Dakota Workforce Safety and Insurance =

The North Dakota Workforce Safety and Insurance office (WSI) is the state agency in North Dakota charged with managing the state's workers compensation system. The office falls under the jurisdiction of the executive branch of government. The office has an advisory Board of Directors, whose members are appointed by the governor.
