= North Dakota Century Code =

Laws of the state

The North Dakota Century Code is the collection of all the statutes passed by the North Dakota Legislative Assembly since the state's admission to the Union. It also includes the North Dakota Constitution.

The numbering system for the Century Code is a three-part number, with each part separated by a hyphen. The first part refers to the title, the second to the chapter, and the third to the section. For example, Section 54-35-01 refers to the first section in Chapter 35 of Title 54 (the section deals with the legislative management of the North Dakota Legislative Assembly).

The decimal point system is used to designate sections that have been inserted between two consecutively numbered sections. For example, Title 12 deals with Corrections, Parole, and Probation, while Title 13 deals with Debtor and Creditor Relationship. The state Criminal Code (which alphabetically falls between the titles) is thus numbered Title 12.1.
