= List of North Dakota state prisons =

This is a list of state prisons in the U.S. state of North Dakota.

There are no federal prisons in North Dakota and this list does not include county jails located in North Dakota. North Dakota does not contract with private prisons.

== Adult facilities ==
- James River Correctional Center (inmate capacity 365)
- Missouri River Correctional Center (inmate capacity 151)
- North Dakota State Penitentiary
- Dakota Women's Correctional Rehab Center (inmate capacity 126)

== Juvenile facilities ==
- North Dakota Youth Correctional Center
