= Electoral reform in North Dakota =

U.S. state electoral reform

Electoral reform in North Dakota refers to efforts to change the voting laws in this U.S. state. After the 2001 regular session of the North Dakota Legislative Assembly, the legislature formed a bi-partisan interim committee to work on state legislative districts. North Dakota law specifies a minimum of 4,000 signatures to get on the Presidential ballot. In North Dakota, felons' voting rights are restored automatically after release from prison.

== Balloting methods ==
North Dakota opted to eliminate direct recording electronic ballots in favor of systems that leave a paper trail. The state also established controversial voting centers in urban areas in place of the former decentralized system in which voters had precinct polling stations close to their homes.

== Ballot access ==
Seven thousand petition signatures to create a new political party and nominate a slate of candidates for office. Yet, even if a new or minor party becomes formally organized, it is difficult for their candidates to be listed on the election ballot for certain offices. Primary election rules require a prospective candidate to not only win the plurality, but for a minimum number of voters to choose to vote in that party's primary.

Independent candidates need a thousand signatures for a statewide office, four thousand for the presidency or 300 for a state legislative office. The independent nominating petition process does not allow for candidates to appear on the ballot with a political party designation, in lieu of independent, except for presidential elections.
