= North Dakota Association of Counties =

Association of American counties

The North Dakota Association of Counties (NDACo), formed in 1975, is a member association formed by the 53 counties in the U.S. state of North Dakota. The Association provides government relations, publication, legislative, and other member relation work on behalf of the counties of North Dakota.

== See also ==
- List of counties in North Dakota
