= List of colleges and universities in North Dakota =

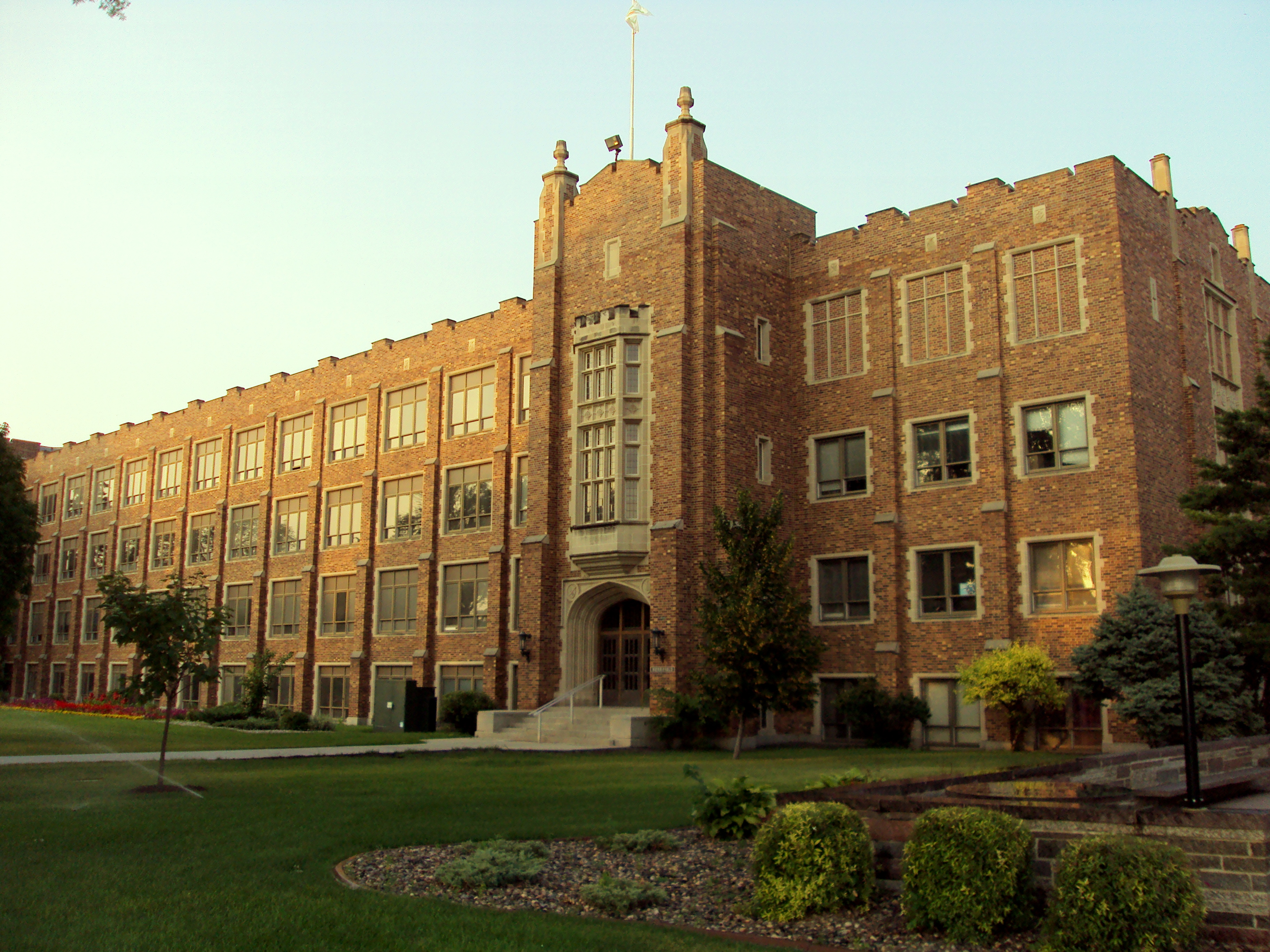
Merrifield Hall at the University of North Dakota, the largest university in the state

There are twenty colleges and universities in the U.S. state of North Dakota that are listed under the Carnegie Classification of Institutions of Higher Education. Grand Forks-based University of North Dakota (UND) is the largest public institution with an enrollment of 13,876 students as of Fall 2022 enrollment data. Fargo-based North Dakota State University (NDSU) is the second largest public institution, with an enrollment of 12,242 students for Fall 2022.

UND, founded February 27, 1883 (six years prior to North Dakota's statehood), is the state's oldest and longest operating post-secondary institution. University of Jamestown (UJ), founded under the name Jamestown College on October 31, 1883, by the Presbyterian Church, is the state's second-oldest established post-secondary institution. Mayville State University (MSU), originally named Mayville Normal School, founded in 1889 by the first North Dakota Legislative Assembly, is the state's third-oldest established post-secondary institution but is the second longest operating school. NDSU, originally named the North Dakota Agricultural College, was founded on March 8, 1890, as part of the Morrill Land-Grant Acts of 1862 and 1890, is the state's fourth-oldest post-secondary institution and third longest operating school.

The North Dakota University System contains eleven public colleges. There are also seven private universities in North Dakota. The University of North Dakota School of Medicine and Health Sciences, a part of UND, is the state's only medical school. The state's only law school is the University of North Dakota School of Law, which is another UND affiliate.

The majority of North Dakota's post-secondary institutions are accredited by the Higher Learning Commission (HLC). Most are accredited by multiple agencies, such as the Commission on Collegiate Nursing Education (CCNE), the National Council for Accreditation of Teacher Education (NCATE), the National League for Nursing (NLNAC), the American Psychological Association (APA), and the Academy of Nutrition and Dietetics.

== Extant institutions ==
Institution	Location(s)	Control (Note: School control is based on the Carnegie Classification of Institutions of Higher Education.)	Type (Note: School types are based on the Carnegie Classification of Institutions of Higher Education.)	Enrollment (Fall 2024)	Founded	Accreditation
Bismarck State College	Bismarck	Public	Baccalaureate/associate's college	4,206	1939	Higher Learning Commission (HLC)
Cankdeska Cikana Community College	Fort Totten	Public	Tribal college	239	1974	Higher Learning Commission (HLC)
Dakota College at Bottineau	Bottineau	Public	Associate's college	1,204	1906	Higher Learning Commission (HLC)
Dickinson State University	Dickinson	Public	Baccalaureate college	1,410	1918	Higher Learning Commission (HLC), NASM, NCATE, NLNAC
Lake Region State College	Devils Lake	Public	Associate's college	1,897	1941	Higher Learning Commission (HLC)
Mayville State University	Mayville	Public	Baccalaureate college	1,134	1889	Higher Learning Commission (HLC), NCATE
Minot State University	Minot	Public	Master's university	2,751	1913	Higher Learning Commission (HLC), ASHA, NASM, NCATE, NLNAC
North Dakota State College of Science	Wahpeton	Public	Associate's college	3,367	1903	Higher Learning Commission (HLC), ADA, AOTA, NLNAC
North Dakota State University	Fargo	Public	Research university	11,952	1890-03-08	Higher Learning Commission (HLC), ACPE, AAMFT, ADA, CCNE, NASAD, NASM, NAST, NCATE
Nueta Hidatsa Sahnish College	New Town	Public	Tribal college	233	1973	Higher Learning Commission (HLC)
Rasmussen University	Fargo	Private for-profit	Baccalaureate/associate's college	52	2006	Higher Learning Commission (HLC)
Sitting Bull College	Fort Yates	Public	Tribal college	309	1973	Higher Learning Commission (HLC)
Trinity Bible College	Ellendale	Private not-for-profit	Special-focus institution	275	1948	ABHE
Turtle Mountain College	Belcourt	Private not-for-profit	Tribal college	872	1972	Higher Learning Commission (HLC)
United Tribes Technical College	Bismarck	Private not-for-profit	Tribal college	576	1969	Higher Learning Commission (HLC), NLNAC
University of Jamestown	Jamestown	Private not-for-profit	Master's university	1,376	1883-10-31	Higher Learning Commission (HLC), NLNAC
University of Mary	Bismarck, Fargo, Williston, Watford City, Grand Forks AFB	Private not-for-profit	Doctoral university	3,861	1959	Higher Learning Commission (HLC), AOTA, APTA, CCNE
University of North Dakota	Grand Forks	Public	Research university	15,019	1883-02-27	Higher Learning Commission (HLC), ABA, ADA, AOTA, APTA, APA, ASHA, CCNE, AANA, LCME, NASAD, NASM, NAST, NCATE
Valley City State University	Valley City	Public	Baccalaureate college	1,806	1890-10-13	Higher Learning Commission (HLC), NASM, NCATE
Williston State College	Williston	Public	Associate's college	934	1957	Higher Learning Commission (HLC)

== Defunct institutions ==
Institution	Location(s)	Control	Founded	Closed	Ref
Assumption College	Richardton	Private	1899	1971	
Dakota Business College	Fargo	Private	1890	1978	
North Dakota State Normal and Industrial School	Ellendale	Public	1899	1971	
Tower University	Tower City	Private	1886	1889	

== Key ==
Abbreviation	Accrediting agency
AAMFT	American Association for Marriage and Family Therapy
AANA	American Association of Nurse Anesthetists
ABA	American Bar Association
ACPE	Accreditation Council for Pharmacy Education
ADA	American Dental Association
ADA	American Dietetic Association
AOTA	American Occupational Therapy Association
APA	American Psychological Association
APTA	American Physical Therapy Association
ASHA	American Speech–Language–Hearing Association
CCNE	Commission on Collegiate Nursing Education
LCME	Liaison Committee on Medical Education
NASAD	National Association of Schools of Art and Design
NASM	National Association of Schools of Music
NAST	National Association of Schools of Theatre
HLC	Higher Learning Commission
NCATE	National Council for Accreditation of Teacher Education
NLNAC	National League for Nursing

== See also ==
- Higher education in the United States
- List of college athletic programs in North Dakota
- List of American institutions of higher education
