= List of power stations in North Dakota =

Sources of North Dakota utility-scale electricity generation in gigawatt-hours, full-year 2025:
1. Coal: 22,578 (53.1%)
2. Wind: 15,378 (36.2%)
3. Natural gas: 2,268 (5.34%)
4. Hydroelectric: 2,194 (5.16%)
5. Petroleum: 31 (0.07%)
6. Other gases: 35 (0.08%)

This is a list of electricity-generating power stations in the U.S. state of North Dakota, sorted by type and name. In 2024, North Dakota had a total summer capacity of 9.7 GW through all of its power plants, and a net generation of 42,557 GWh. In 2025, the electrical energy generation mix was 53.1% coal, 36.2% wind, 5.3% natural gas, and 5.2% hydroelectric. Petroleum liquids and other gases generated most of the remaining 0.2%.

North Dakota contains the world's largest known deposit of lignite coal, and hosted 4% of U.S. coal extraction in year 2019. It ranked second behind the state of Texas in U.S. crude oil extraction. Natural gas extraction has been growing as well, and exceeded 1 trillion cubic feet for the first time.

North Dakota oil extraction included the flaring of over 200 billion cubic feet of associated petroleum gas in year 2019. Operations were widely distributed throughout the Bakken Formation which underlays the northwest region of the state. This record-high volume of wasted natural gas could have generated over 30,000 GWh of electrical energy, an amount equal to three-quarters of the state's total generation.

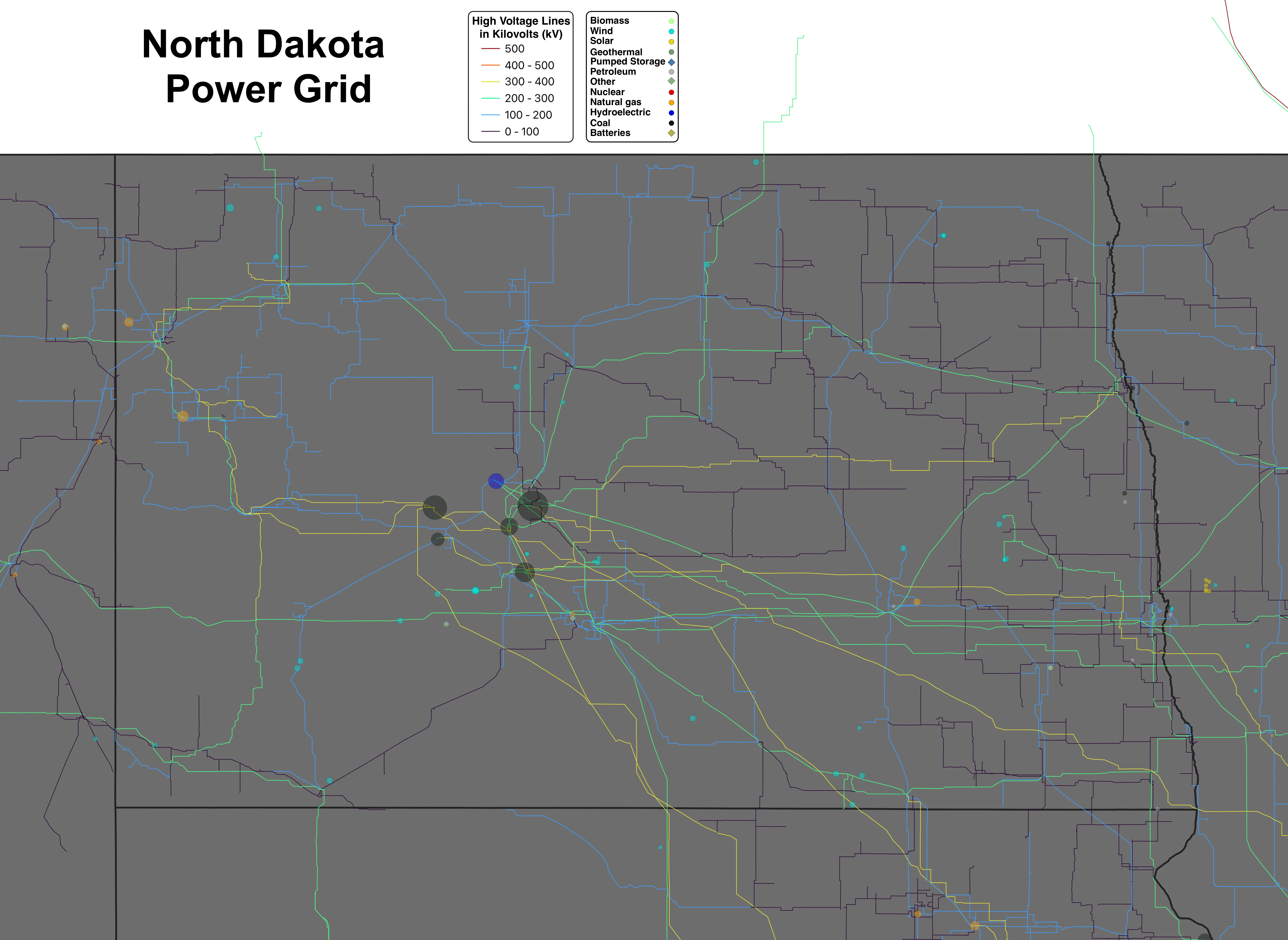
North Dakota power grid

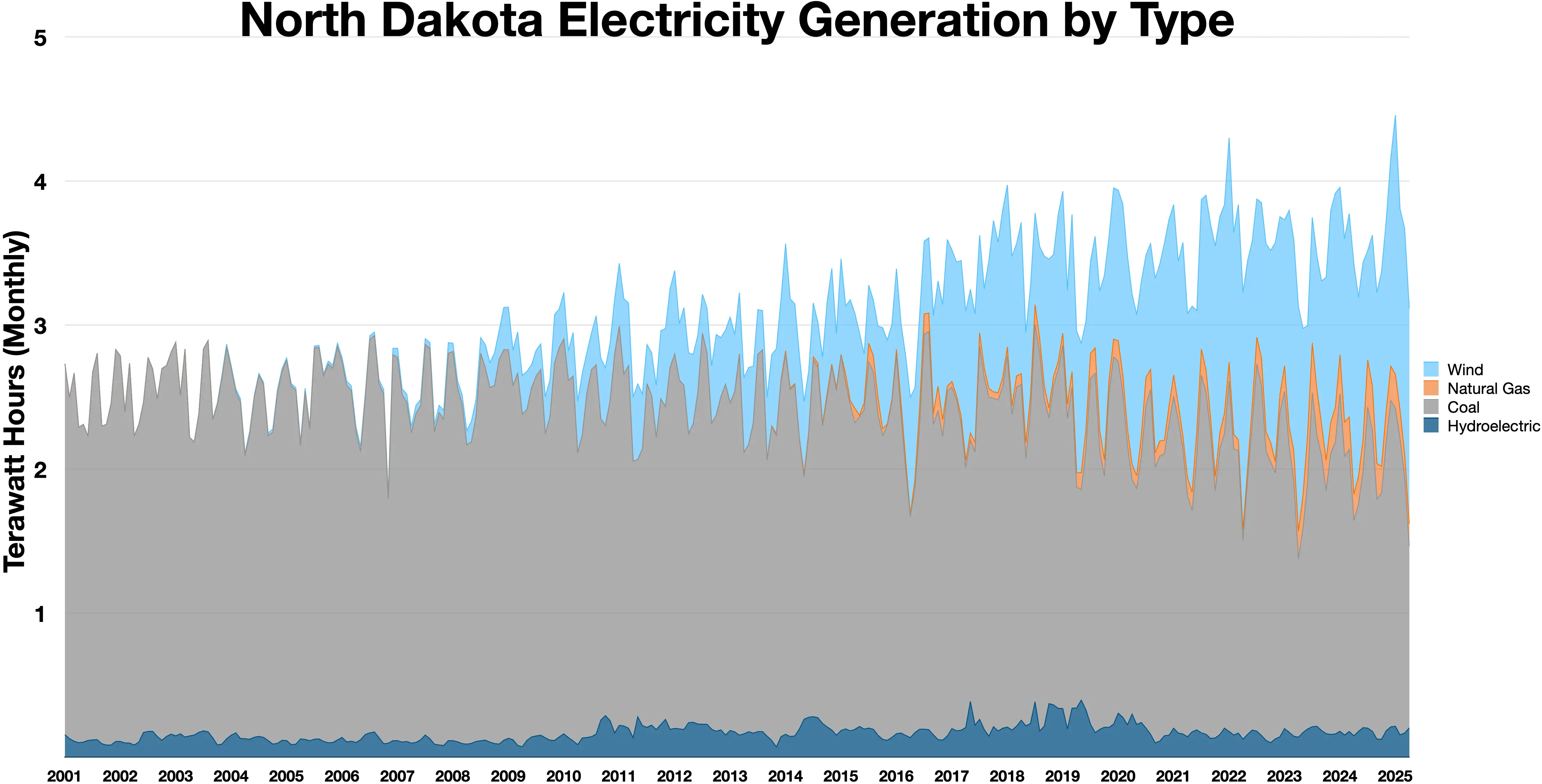
North Dakota electricity generation by type

== Nuclear power stations ==
North Dakota had no utility-scale plants that used fissile material as a fuel in 2019.

== Fossil-fuel power stations ==
Data from the U.S. Energy Information Administration serves as a general reference.

=== Coal and lignite ===
A useful map of active and retiring coal generation plants is provided by the Sierra Club.

Name	Location	Coordinates	Capacity (MW)	Refs	Year opened	Notes
American Crystal Sugar - Drayton	Pembina County	48.5932°N 97.1761°W	6.0		1965	
American Crystal Sugar - Hillsboro	Traill County	47.4376°N 97.0631°W	13.3		1990	
Antelope Valley Station	Mercer County	47.3705°N 101.8357°W	900		1984/1986	
Coal Creek Station	McLean County	47.3777°N 101.1571°W	1150		1979/1980	
Coyote Station	Mercer County	47.2214°N 101.8157°W	430		1981	
Leland Olds Station	Mercer County	47.2808°N 101.3212°W	650		1966/1975	
Milton R. Young Station	Oliver County	47.0659°N 101.2131°W	680		1970/1977	

=== Natural gas and petroleum ===
Name	Location	Coordinates	Capacity (MW)	Fuel type	Generation type	Number of units	Refs	Year opened	Notes
Coal Creek Plant	McLean County	47.3778°N 101.1571°W	6.0	Petroleum	Reciprocating engine (x2)	2		2016	
Grafton Plant	Walsh County	48.4300°N 97.4033°W	4.0	Petroleum	Reciprocating engine (x4)	4		1937/1949/ 1956	
Heskett Station	Morton County	46.8657°N 100.8873°W	178	Gas	Simple cycle (x2)	2		2014/2024	Not to be confused with Heskett 1 & 2 coal-fired units (retired 2022, demolished in 2023)
Hillsboro Plant	Traill County	47.3970°N 97.0606°W	4.0	Petroleum	Reciprocating engine (x2)	2		2002	
Jamestown GT	Stutsman County	46.9057°N 98.6622°W	41.7	Petroleum	Simple cycle (x2)	2		1976/1978	
Lonesome Creek Station	McKenzie County	47.7967°N 103.5786°W	200	Gas	Simple cycle (x5)	5		2013/2015/ 2017	
Pioneer Generating Station	Williams County	48.2326°N 103.9528°W	337	Gas, petroleum	Simple cycle (x3) reciprocating engine (x12)	15		2014/2017	
Spiritwood Station	Stutsman County	46.9264°N 98.4997°W	100	Gas	Steam turbine	1		2014	Originally coal-fired. Convert to gas in 2017.

== Renewable power stations ==
Data from the U.S. Energy Information Administration serves as a general reference.

=== Hydroelectric ===
Name	Location	Coordinates	Capacity (MW)	Refs	Year opened	Notes
Garrison Hydro Power Plant	Mercer County	47.4945°N 101.4115°W	510		1956/1960	USACE owned and managed

=== Wind ===
Also see wind industry of North Dakota map.

Name	Location	Coordinates	Capacity (MW)	Turbine spec	Number of units	Refs	Year opened	Note
Ashtabula Wind Farm (I-III)	Barnes County; Griggs County; Steele County	46°39′N 98°00′W	378	GE 1.5-91, GE 1.5-91	250		2008/2009/ 2010	
Aurora Wind Farm	Williams County; Mountrail County	48°21′N 102°56′W	299	Nordex N149/4.8	71		2021	
Baldwin Wind Farm (I-II) (aka Wilton Wind Farm)	Burleigh County	47°03′N 100°30′W	99	GE 1.5-77, GE 1.5-77, GE 1.6-91	66		2005/2006/ 2010	
Bison Wind Energy Center (I-IV)	Morton County	47°10′N 101°17′W	497	Siemens SWT-2.3-101, Siemens SWT-3.0-101, Siemens SWT-3.2-113	165		2010/2012/ 2015	
Border Winds Wind Farm	Rolette County	48°59′N 99°34′W	150	Vestas V100-2.0	75		2016	
Brady Wind Farm (I-II)	Stark County	46°42′N 102°46′W	299	GE 1.715-103, GE 2.0-116	159		2016	
Cedar Hills Wind Farm	Bowman County	46°15′N 103°46′W	19.5	GE 1.5-77	13		2010	
Courtenay Wind Farm	Stutsman County	46°54′N 98°47′W	200	Vestas V100-2.0	100		2016	
Emmons-Logan Wind Farm	Emmons County; Logan County	46°25′N 99°56′W	216.4	GE 1.72-103, GE 2.72-116	123		2019	
Foxtrail Wind	Dickey County	46°05′N 98°52′W	150	Vestas V110-2.0	75		2019	
Glen Ullin Energy Center	Morton County; Mercer County	46°58′N 101°49′W	107	GE 2.5-116	43		2019	
Langdon Wind Energy Center	Cavalier County	46°06′N 98°31′W	200	GE 1.5-77, GE 1.62-87, GE 1.62-91	133		2007/2008	
Lindahl Wind Farm	Williams County	48°24′N 102°56′W	150	Vestas V100-2.0	75		2017	
Luverne Wind Farm (adjacent to Ashtabula)	Steele County	47°25′N 98°06′W	49.5	GE 1.5-82.5	33		2009	
Merricourt Wind Project	Dickey County	46°12′N 98°45′W	150	Vestas V110-2.0	75		2020	
New Frontier Wind	McHenry County	48°04′N 100°48′W	99	Vestas V126-3.45	29		2018	
North Dakota Wind (I-II)	LaMoure County	46°20′N 98°52′W	61.5	GE 1.5-70.5	41		2003	
Northern Divide (Burke) Wind Project	Divide County, Burke County	48°49′N 102°58′W	193	GE 1.7-103, GE 2.72-116	74		2020	
Oliver Wind Energy Center (I-III)	Oliver County	47°09′N 101°20′W	198	Siemens SWT-2.3-108, GE 1.6-91, GE 1.79-100, GE 2.0-116	102		2006/2007/ 2017	
Prairie Winds Wind Farm (I-II)	Ward County	48°14′N 101°17′W	122.6	GE 1.5-77, GE 1.5-82.5, Nordex N60	82		2002/2009	
Rugby Wind Farm	Pierce County	48°22′N 100°00′W	149.1	Suzlon S88	71		2009	
Sunflower Wind Farm	Morton County	46°50′N 102°04′W	104	Vestas V100-2.0	52		2016	
Tatanka Wind Farm	Dickey County; McIntosh County	45°56′N 98°58′W	91.5*	Acciona AW82/1500	65		2008	* portion in North Dakota
Thunder Spirit Wind Farm (I-II)	Adams County	46°19′N 102°31′W	155.5	Nordex N100, Nordex N117/3000	59		2015/2018	
Velva Wind Farm	McHenry County	48°05′N 100°55′W	11.9	Vestas V47-0.66	18		2005	

=== Solar ===
There are currently no operating utility-scale solar farms in North Dakota. National Grid Renewables, formerly known as Geronimo Energy, has been developing several potential projects within the state, including the 200 MW Harmony Solar Project in Cass County and the 128 MW Wild Spring Solar Project in Pennington County.
