= Solar power in North Dakota =

Solar power in North Dakota has been a little-used resource. The state ranks last on installed solar power in the United States, with .47 MW of installed capacity. Solar on rooftops can provide 24.6% of all electricity used in North Dakota from 3,300 MW of solar panels. The most cost effective application for solar panels is for pumping water at remote wells where solar panels can be installed for $800 vs. running power lines for $15,000/mile.

== Utility scale ==
Traditionally a coal and wind state, the cost reduction of solar has enabled North Dakota to include solar power plants in its grid. A 200 MW solar station costing $250 million and covering 1,600 acres was approved in 2019, to operate in Cass County by 2020.

The first solar farm in North Dakota, the 300 kilowatt Cannon Ball Community Solar Farm opened in February 2019, and represented "half the total solar energy being generated across the state," according to its press release. The solar farm is located on the Standing Rock Reservation, which saw increased interest in renewable energy as a result of the Dakota Access Pipeline protests.

== Net metering ==
Net metering is available monthly to all consumers generating up to 100 kW, one of the worst policies in the country, as it is reconciled monthly at the avoided cost rate, meaning that only a portion is rolled over, although some utilities add a REC adder, giving the state a D. The primary reason to use net metering is to roll over summer generation to winter usage, which requires continuous roll over of excess generation. Technically North Dakota's net metering policy is an FIT program, not a net metering policy, because meters are only read once a month, and is an FIT program that pays one of the lowest rates in the world, as it 1) only pays for excess generation, and 2) pays a lower, rather than a higher, rate. By comparison, Ontario's 2010 FIT program paid 80.2¢ Canadian/kWh for rooftop mounted solar panels.

== Solar race cars ==
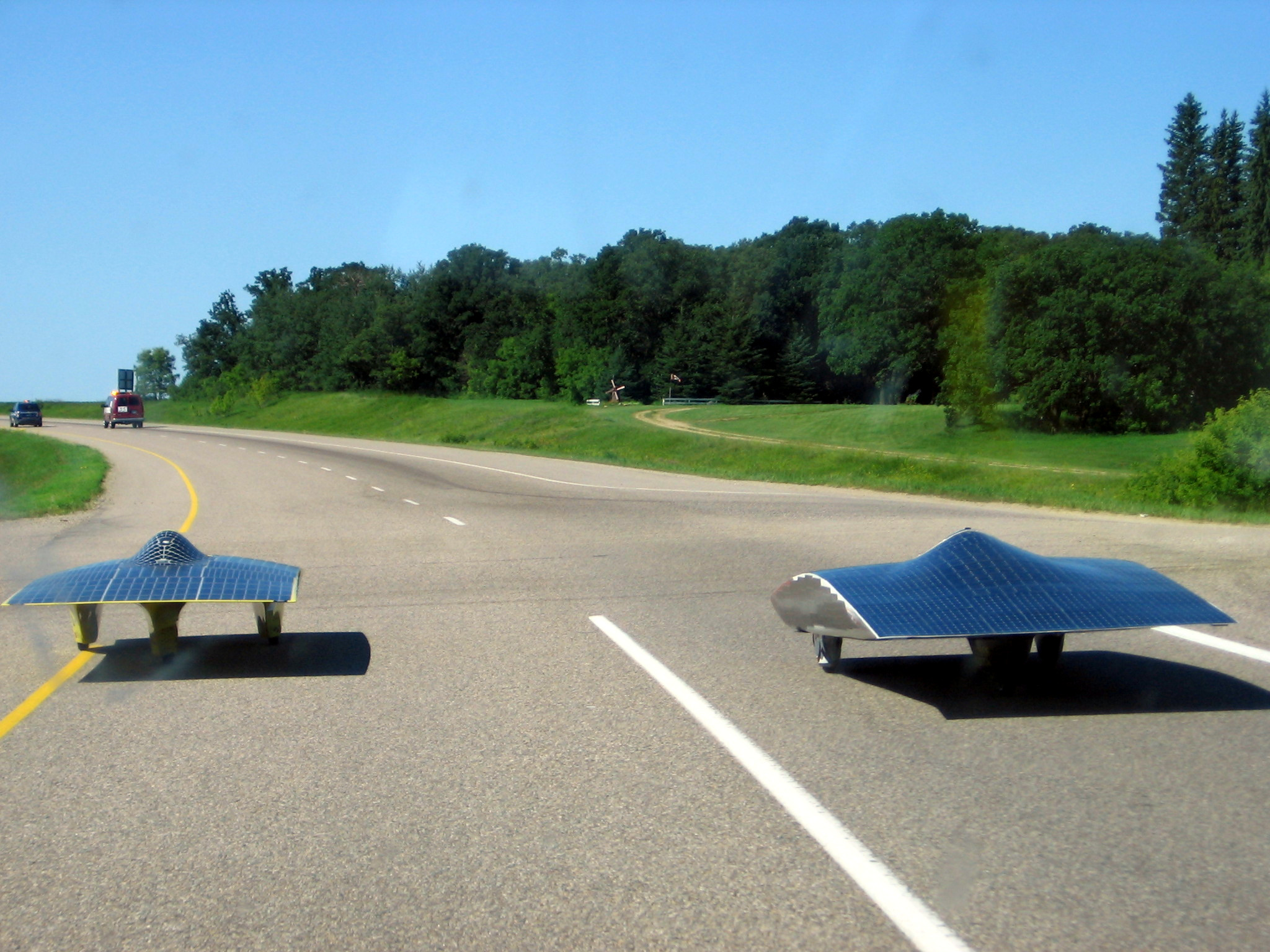
Solar race cars

Both North Dakota State University and the University of North Dakota built solar race cars. A solar car uses less power than a toaster, but can travel continuously at 55 mph using energy stored in batteries, charged only from the car's solar panels. In 2009 a solar car of this type visited Fargo while setting the record for the farthest distance traveled by a solar car. Today's solar race cars are typically street legal, although they are so different looking that in Alaska one was mistaken for a UFO.

== Statistics ==
Source: NREL

Grid-connected PV capacity (MW)
Year	Capacity	Change	% change
2010	<0.1		
2011	<0.1		
2012	0.1		
2013	0.2	0.1	100%
2014	0.22	0.02	10%
2015	0.22	0	0%
2016	0.22	0	0%
2017	0.22	0	0%
2018	0.52	0.3	136%
2019	0.67	0.15	28%
2020	0.84	0.17	25%
2021	1.6	0.76	%
2022	2	0.4	%

== See also ==
- Wind power in North Dakota
- Solar power in the United States
- Renewable energy in the United States
