= Geography of North Dakota =

North Dakota map of Köppen climate classification.

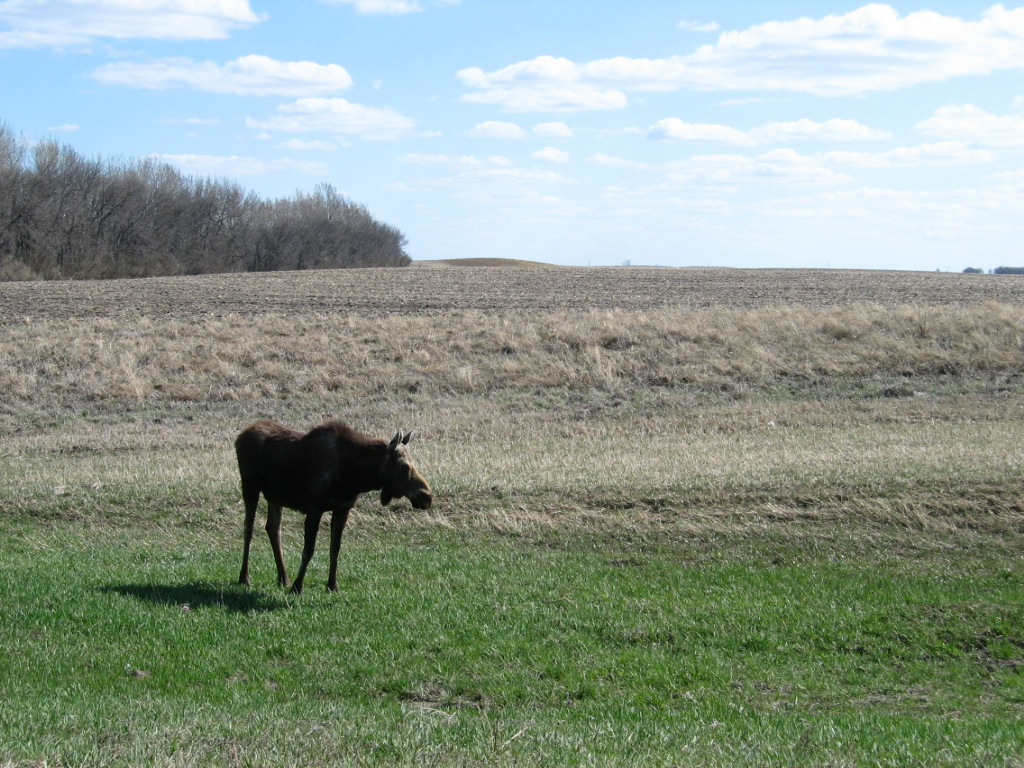
Shot within the North Dakota section of the Great Plains where a small population of Moose can be found.

The geography of North Dakota consists of three major geographic regions: in the east is the Red River Valley, west of this, the Missouri Plateau. The southwestern part of North Dakota is covered by the Great Plains, accentuated by the Badlands. There is also much in the way of geology and hydrology.

North Dakota is about 340 miles (545 km) east to west and 211 miles (340 km) north to south, with a total area of 70,704 square miles (183,123 km²), making it the 19th largest of the 50 U.S. states. About 2.4% of North Dakota's area is covered by water.

== Geographic divisions ==
=== Red River Valley ===
The Red River Valley takes up the eastern portion of the state, with the Red River of the North forming the border with Minnesota.

The Valley is the remnant lake bed of the ancient Lake Agassiz. It is very flat, and is quite fertile. This area of North Dakota is mostly farm country, with wheat, sugarbeets, and maize as staple crops, and along with other crops and livestock, cover the area. The valley contains the lowest point in North Dakota which is the Red River at Pembina, at 750 feet (230 m) above sea level.

=== Missouri Plateau and Drift Prairie ===
To the west of the Red River Valley is the Drift Prairie and the Missouri Plateau (or Missouri Coteau). The Drift Prairie is bordered on the north by the Turtle Mountains and separated from the Red River Valley by the Pembina Hills. This area rises from 200 to 2,000 feet over the Red River Valley. The Drift Prairie is covered in lakes, stream valleys, and rolling hills. This region suffers moderate to severe flooding from the Red River almost annually, caused by the heavy snowfall in this region every winter.

=== Great Plains ===
About half of North Dakota is covered by the Great Plains. The Great Plains, in the southwestern section of the state, are hilly and rich in mineral deposits. This area rises about 300 to 400 feet above the Drift Prairie east of the Missouri River. Along the Missouri River, the land is lower. This area is called the Missouri Break. To the south and west of the river is an area of rugged valleys and buttes called the Slope.

=== Badlands ===
The Badlands lie in southwestern North Dakota. The Badlands are exposed surfaces of stone and clay that erosion has shaped into striking formations; many shades of browns, reds, grays, and yellows appear in buttes, pyramids, domes, and cones. They stretch for about 190 miles (305 km) and are from 6 to 20 miles (10 to 30 km) wide. In some areas of the Badlands the rocks contain lignite coal that has been burning for many years. The clay above these coal beds has turned bright pink and red. White Butte, the highest point in North Dakota, is located in the Badlands, and stands 3506 feet (1069 m) above sea level.

== Climate ==
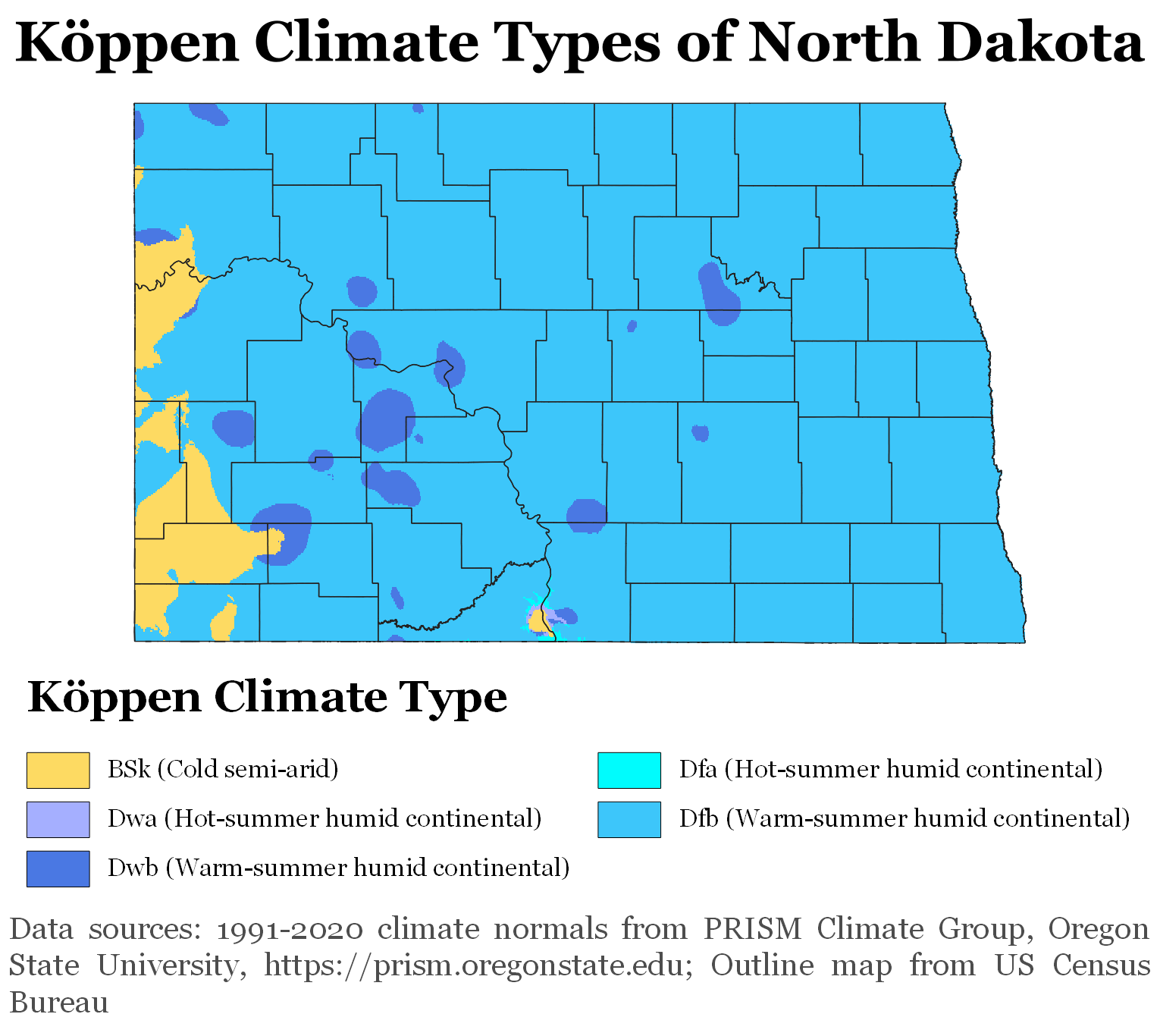
Köppen climate types of North Dakota, using 1991–2020 climate normals.

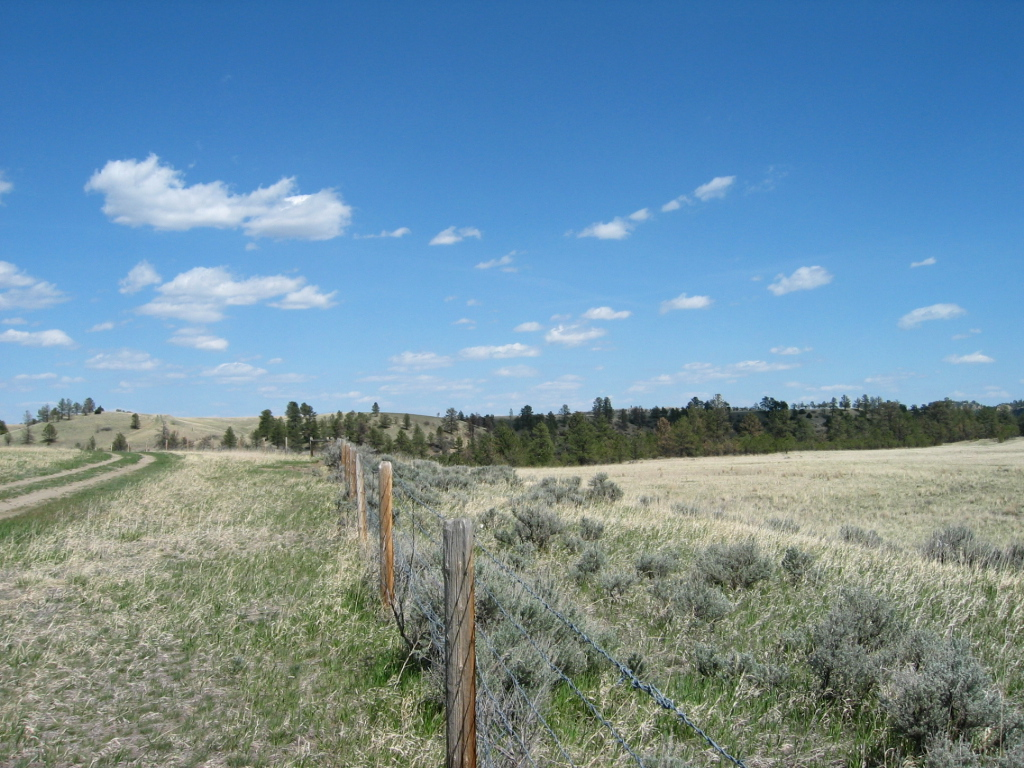
Western North Dakota lands along Interstate 94 in North Dakota. With an average 17 inches of precipitation a year, North Dakota is one of the driest states in the United States.

North Dakota's climate is typical of a continental climate with cold winters and warm-hot summers. The state's location in the Upper Midwest allows it to experience some of the widest variety of weather in the United States, and each of the four seasons has its own distinct characteristics. The eastern half of the state has a humid continental climate (Köppen climate classification Dfb and Dwb) with warm to hot, somewhat humid summers and cold, windy winters, while the western half has a semi-arid climate (Köppen climate classification BSk) with less precipitation and less humidity but similar temperature profiles. The areas east of the Missouri River get slightly colder winters, while those west of the stream get higher summer daytime temperatures. In general, the diurnal temperature difference is prone to be more significant in the west due to higher elevation and less humidity.

== Notable points ==
Extreme points

- Northernmost point: Border with Saskatchewan and Manitoba 49° N
- Southernmost point: Border with South Dakota at Bois de Sioux River, 45°56'07" N
- Easternmost point: Bois de Sioux River near Fairmount, 46.084058° N, 96.554405° W
- Westernmost point: Border with Montana and Saskatchewan, 104° 02' 46" W

Physiographic points

- Highest point: White Butte 3507' (1069 m)
- Lowest point: Red River of the North at Pembina 750' (230 m)
- Most prominent point: Boundary Butte, Turtle Mountains, elevation 2541' (774 m), prominence 1030' (314 m), isolation 95.7 mi. (154 km)

Hydrographic points

- The confluence of the Yellowstone and Missouri Rivers near Buford, North Dakota.
