= Climate of North Dakota =

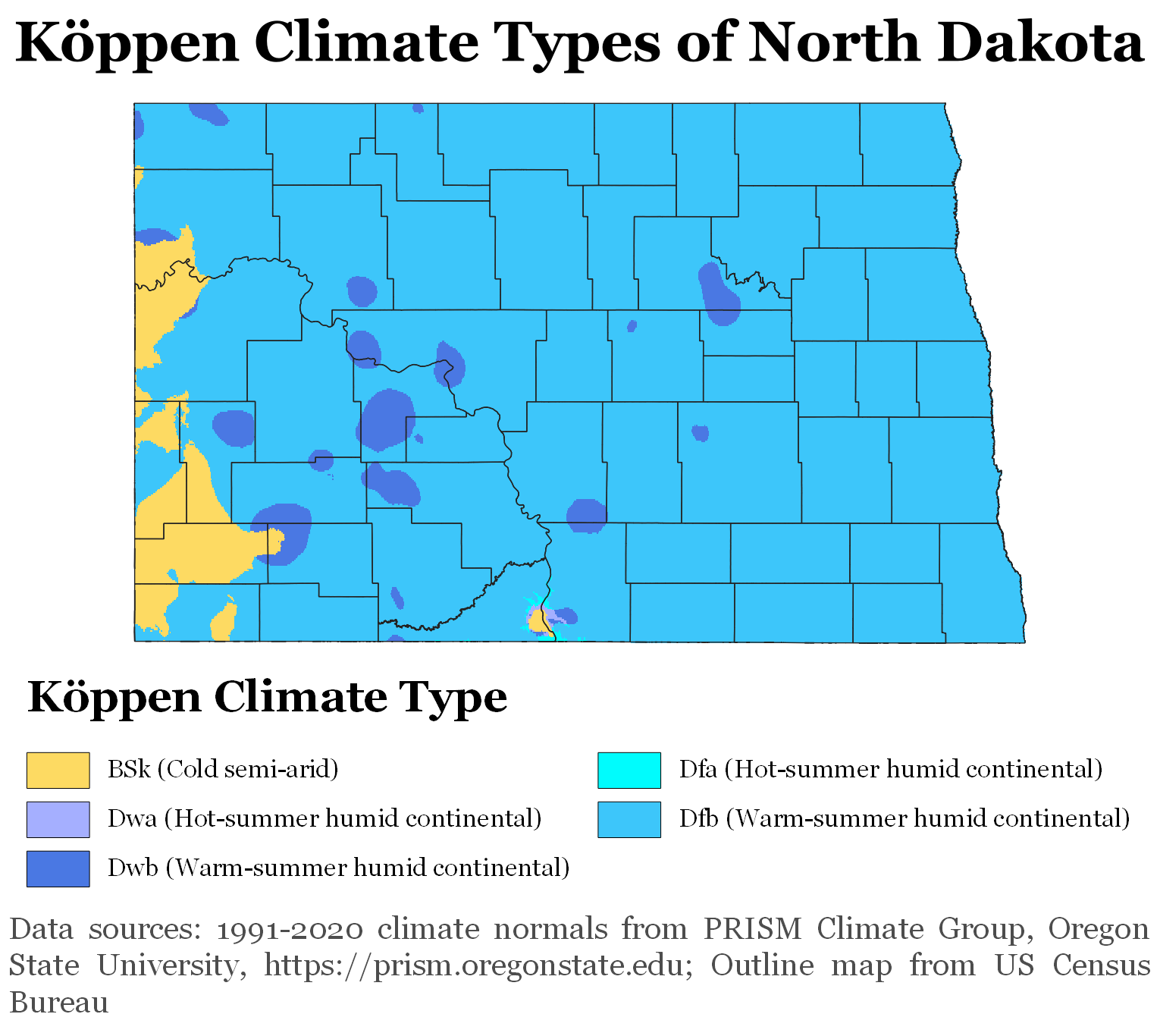
Köppen climate types of North Dakota, using 1991–2020 climate normals.

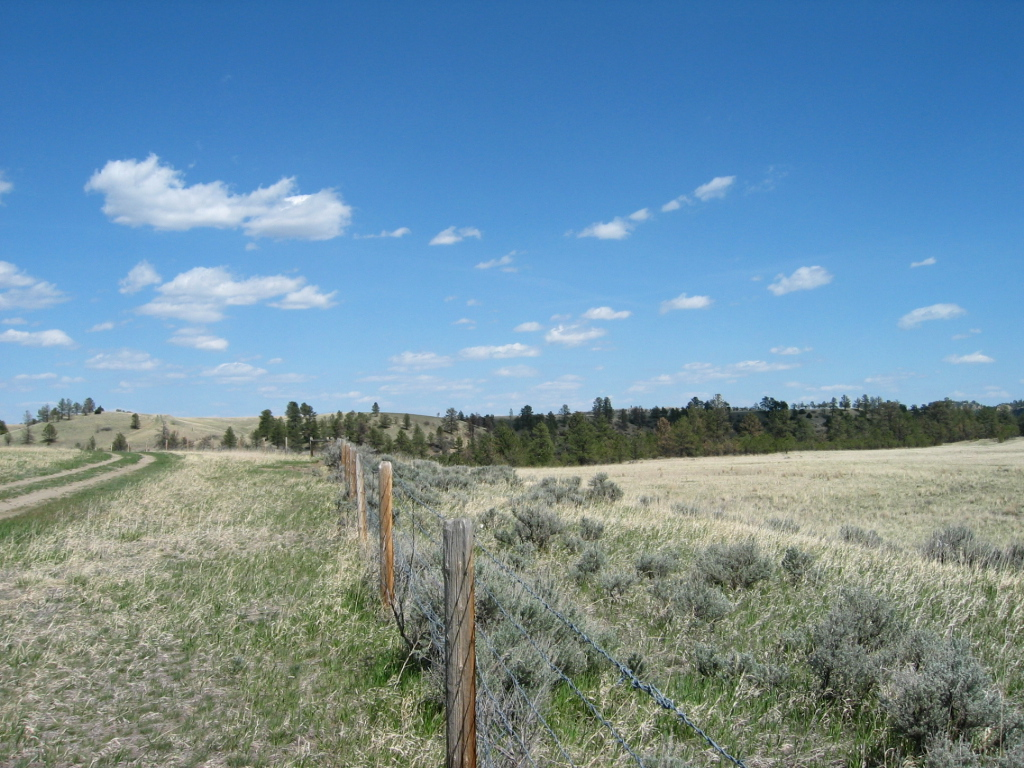
Western North Dakota lands along Interstate 94 in North Dakota. With an average 17 inches of precipitation a year, North Dakota is one of the driest states in the United States.

North Dakota's climate is typical of a continental climate with cold winters and warm-hot summers. The state's location in the Upper Midwest allows it to experience some of the widest variety of weather in the United States, and each of the four seasons has its own distinct characteristics. The eastern half of the state has a humid continental climate (Köppen climate classification Dfb and Dwb) with warm to hot, somewhat humid summers and cold, windy winters, while the western half has a semi-arid climate (Köppen climate classification BSk) with less precipitation and less humidity but similar temperature profiles. The areas east of the Missouri River get slightly colder winters, while those west of the stream get higher summer daytime temperatures. In general, the diurnal temperature difference is prone to be more significant in the west due to higher elevation and less humidity.

== General climatology ==
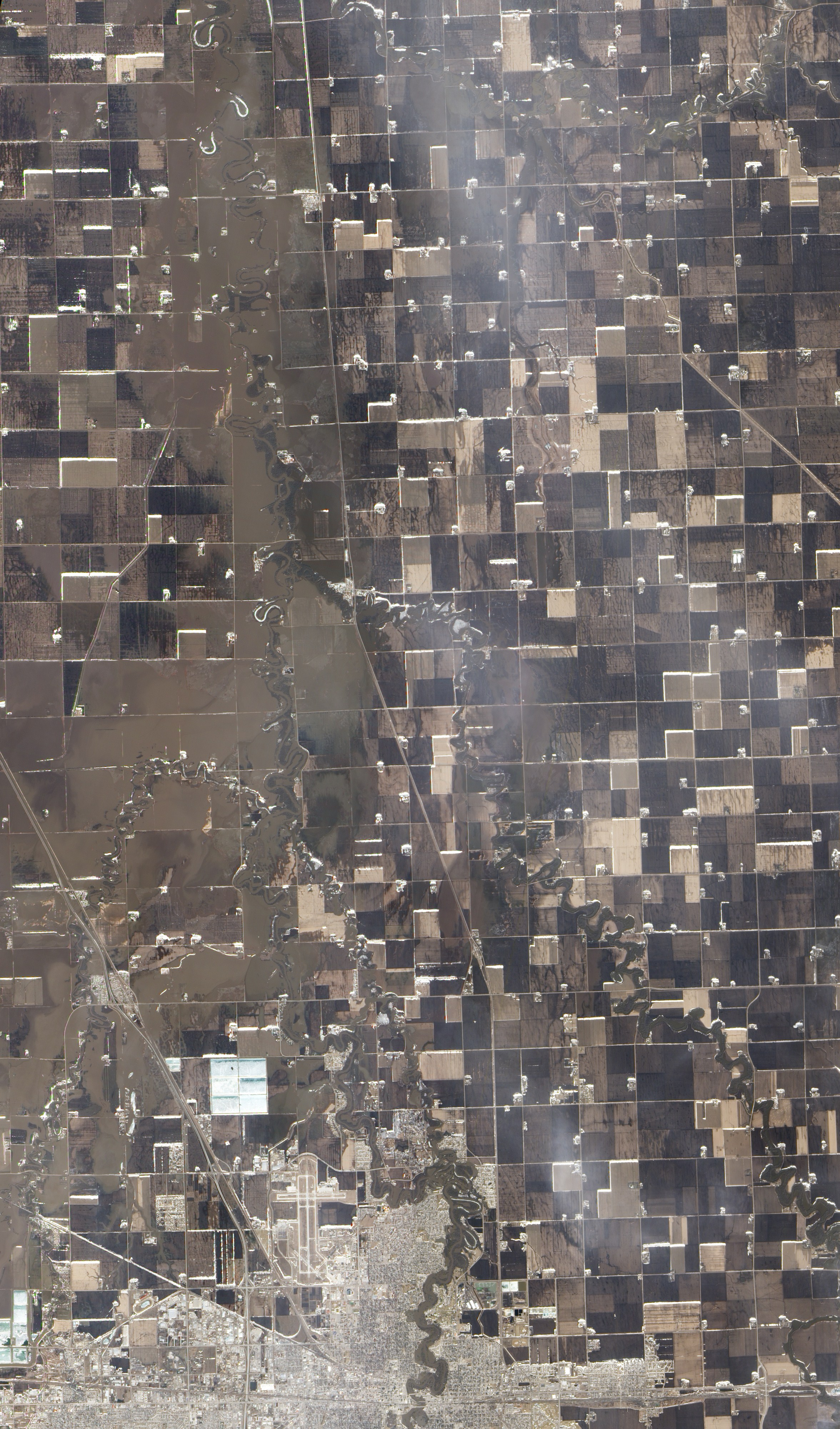
Flooding in North Dakota in March 2010.

Due to its location in the center of North America, North Dakota experiences temperature extremes characteristic of a continental climate, with cold winters and hot summers. Each season has distinctive upper air patterns which bring different weather conditions with them. One feature of a continental climate is that weather patterns can be unpredictable. For example, an Alberta clipper, a low pressure system originating in the province of Alberta in Canada, would be a common winter occurrence in North Dakota. But with the general unpredictability of weather in a continental climate, such a storm system could occur in spring, or in late autumn. Hot weather, though usually confined to July and August, can sometimes begin as early as April or May, and could spill over into September or October.

Being 1,000 miles (1,609 km) from any large body of water (with the exception of Lake Superior), temperatures and precipitation in North Dakota can vary widely. North Dakota is far enough north to experience −60 °F (−51 °C) temperatures and blizzards during the winter months, but far enough south to experience 121 °F (49 °C) temperatures and tornado outbreaks in the summer. The 181 °F degree (100 °C) variation between North Dakota's highest and lowest temperature is the 3rd largest variation of any U.S. State, and the largest of any non-mountainous state.

North Dakota is far from major sources of moisture and is in the transition zone between the moist East and the semi-arid West, as precipitation and humidity decrease from east to west. Annual average precipitation across the state ranges from around 14 in (35.6 cm) in the west to 22 in (55.9 cm) in the east. Snow is the main form of precipitation from November through March, while rain is the most common the rest of the year. It has snowed in North Dakota during every month except August. The ENSO also has a significant impact on North Dakota's weather. During El Niño, the jet stream is often weakened and shoved further north into Canada. This usually blocks arctic air from entering North Dakota and a milder zonal pattern takes place. The opposite phase, La Niña, strengthens the jet stream even more, making arctic air even colder and more dominant.

=== Statistics for ThreadEx cities ===
Climate data for Bismarck Municipal Airport, North Dakota (1991–2020 normals, (Note: Mean monthly maxima and minima (i.e. the highest and lowest temperature readings during an entire month or year) calculated based on data at said location from 1991 to 2020.) extremes 1874–present (Note: Records for Bismarck have been kept at the Bismarck Municipal Airport since January 1948 and at an undisclosed location from October 1874 to December 1947.))
Month	Jan	Feb	Mar	Apr	May	Jun	Jul	Aug	Sep	Oct	Nov	Dec	Year
Record high °F (°C)	63 (17)	73 (23)	81 (27)	93 (34)	102 (39)	111 (44)	114 (46)	109 (43)	105 (41)	95 (35)	79 (26)	66 (19)	114 (46)
Mean maximum °F (°C)	46.7 (8.2)	49.9 (9.9)	66.7 (19.3)	80.2 (26.8)	87.1 (30.6)	93.2 (34.0)	98.3 (36.8)	98.2 (36.8)	93.0 (33.9)	82.1 (27.8)	63.9 (17.7)	49.4 (9.7)	101.4 (38.6)
Mean daily maximum °F (°C)	23.2 (−4.9)	27.8 (−2.3)	41.0 (5.0)	56.0 (13.3)	68.3 (20.2)	77.9 (25.5)	84.7 (29.3)	83.5 (28.6)	73.4 (23.0)	57.1 (13.9)	40.6 (4.8)	27.7 (−2.4)	55.1 (12.8)
Daily mean °F (°C)	12.8 (−10.7)	17.5 (−8.1)	30.1 (−1.1)	43.2 (6.2)	55.3 (12.9)	65.4 (18.6)	71.3 (21.8)	69.6 (20.9)	59.7 (15.4)	44.8 (7.1)	29.9 (−1.2)	17.9 (−7.8)	43.1 (6.2)
Mean daily minimum °F (°C)	2.4 (−16.4)	7.2 (−13.8)	19.1 (−7.2)	30.4 (−0.9)	42.4 (5.8)	52.9 (11.6)	57.9 (14.4)	55.7 (13.2)	45.9 (7.7)	32.6 (0.3)	19.1 (−7.2)	8.1 (−13.3)	31.1 (−0.5)
Mean minimum °F (°C)	−23.8 (−31.0)	−17.6 (−27.6)	−4.7 (−20.4)	13.4 (−10.3)	26.9 (−2.8)	39.7 (4.3)	46.2 (7.9)	43.3 (6.3)	29.8 (−1.2)	15.9 (−8.9)	−1.0 (−18.3)	−16.0 (−26.7)	−27.9 (−33.3)
Record low °F (°C)	−45 (−43)	−45 (−43)	−36 (−38)	−12 (−24)	13 (−11)	30 (−1)	32 (0)	32 (0)	10 (−12)	−10 (−23)	−30 (−34)	−43 (−42)	−45 (−43)
Average precipitation inches (mm)	0.48 (12)	0.52 (13)	0.84 (21)	1.34 (34)	2.50 (64)	3.36 (85)	3.07 (78)	2.50 (64)	1.72 (44)	1.43 (36)	0.69 (18)	0.60 (15)	19.05 (484)
Average snowfall inches (cm)	8.9 (23)	7.5 (19)	8.5 (22)	4.6 (12)	0.4 (1.0)	0.0 (0.0)	0.0 (0.0)	0.0 (0.0)	0.0 (0.0)	2.5 (6.4)	8.0 (20)	10.1 (26)	50.5 (128)
Average extreme snow depth inches (cm)	8.0 (20)	7.0 (18)	5.8 (15)	3.5 (8.9)	0.2 (0.51)	0.0 (0.0)	0.0 (0.0)	0.0 (0.0)	0.0 (0.0)	1.3 (3.3)	4.4 (11)	6.3 (16)	11.5 (29)
Average precipitation days (≥ 0.01 in)	7.8	7.9	7.5	8.1	10.4	11.6	9.7	8.0	7.3	7.2	6.6	7.7	99.8
Average snowy days (≥ 0.1 in)	9.9	8.7	6.3	2.7	0.4	0.0	0.0	0.0	0.0	2.5	8.0	10.1	44.6
Average relative humidity (%)	71.3	72.4	69.9	61.8	60.1	65.0	61.8	60.6	63.7	63.8	72.0	74.5	66.4
Average dew point °F (°C)	2.3 (−16.5)	8.6 (−13.0)	18.9 (−7.3)	28.6 (−1.9)	39.6 (4.2)	50.5 (10.3)	54.9 (12.7)	52.0 (11.1)	42.4 (5.8)	32.2 (0.1)	19.8 (−6.8)	7.5 (−13.6)	29.8 (−1.2)
Mean monthly sunshine hours	149.4	153.5	222.3	244.3	296.1	318.1	354.6	316.2	245.9	191.7	122.6	122.9	2,737.6
Percentage possible sunshine	53	53	60	60	64	67	74	72	65	57	43	46	61
Average ultraviolet index	0.8	1.5	2.9	4.7	6.3	7.5	7.9	6.7	4.6	2.4	1.1	0.8	3.9
Source 1: NOAA (relative humidity and sun 1961–1990)
Source 2: UV Index Today (1995 to 2022)

Climate data for Grand Forks International Airport, North Dakota (1991–2020 normals, extremes 1893–present)
Month	Jan	Feb	Mar	Apr	May	Jun	Jul	Aug	Sep	Oct	Nov	Dec	Year
Record high °F (°C)	52 (11)	67 (19)	83 (28)	100 (38)	105 (41)	105 (41)	109 (43)	104 (40)	103 (39)	95 (35)	75 (24)	58 (14)	109 (43)
Mean maximum °F (°C)	39.1 (3.9)	40.3 (4.6)	54.2 (12.3)	75.6 (24.2)	86.6 (30.3)	91.2 (32.9)	91.5 (33.1)	92.2 (33.4)	89.4 (31.9)	77.4 (25.2)	57.1 (13.9)	40.3 (4.6)	95.1 (35.1)
Mean daily maximum °F (°C)	15.8 (−9.0)	20.5 (−6.4)	33.9 (1.1)	52.0 (11.1)	66.9 (19.4)	76.4 (24.7)	80.7 (27.1)	79.8 (26.6)	70.4 (21.3)	53.9 (12.2)	35.7 (2.1)	21.4 (−5.9)	50.6 (10.3)
Daily mean °F (°C)	6.3 (−14.3)	10.6 (−11.9)	24.4 (−4.2)	40.7 (4.8)	54.1 (12.3)	64.6 (18.1)	68.9 (20.5)	67.0 (19.4)	57.9 (14.4)	43.2 (6.2)	26.7 (−2.9)	12.8 (−10.7)	39.8 (4.3)
Mean daily minimum °F (°C)	−3.1 (−19.5)	0.7 (−17.4)	15.0 (−9.4)	29.3 (−1.5)	41.4 (5.2)	52.9 (11.6)	57.0 (13.9)	54.3 (12.4)	45.3 (7.4)	32.5 (0.3)	17.8 (−7.9)	4.2 (−15.4)	28.9 (−1.7)
Mean minimum °F (°C)	−26.1 (−32.3)	−21.6 (−29.8)	−10.3 (−23.5)	14.0 (−10.0)	27.0 (−2.8)	40.9 (4.9)	46.3 (7.9)	42.9 (6.1)	31.0 (−0.6)	17.3 (−8.2)	−1.5 (−18.6)	−18.1 (−27.8)	−28.9 (−33.8)
Record low °F (°C)	−43 (−42)	−42 (−41)	−36 (−38)	−9 (−23)	5 (−15)	28 (−2)	30 (−1)	30 (−1)	11 (−12)	−9 (−23)	−35 (−37)	−37 (−38)	−43 (−42)
Average precipitation inches (mm)	0.49 (12)	0.51 (13)	0.91 (23)	1.21 (31)	2.80 (71)	3.77 (96)	3.52 (89)	2.81 (71)	2.26 (57)	1.88 (48)	0.92 (23)	0.66 (17)	21.74 (552)
Average snowfall inches (cm)	9.9 (25)	7.1 (18)	7.4 (19)	3.5 (8.9)	0.0 (0.0)	0.0 (0.0)	0.0 (0.0)	0.0 (0.0)	0.0 (0.0)	1.6 (4.1)	6.6 (17)	12.3 (31)	48.4 (123)
Average extreme snow depth inches (cm)	11.3 (29)	11.6 (29)	10.9 (28)	2.7 (6.9)	0.0 (0.0)	0.0 (0.0)	0.0 (0.0)	0.0 (0.0)	0.0 (0.0)	0.6 (1.5)	3.7 (9.4)	8.3 (21)	15.1 (38)
Average precipitation days (≥ 0.01 in)	8.4	6.8	7.3	7.7	10.7	12.1	10.2	8.8	8.6	8.4	7.0	8.8	104.8
Average snowy days (≥ 0.1 in)	10.2	7.7	5.8	2.3	0.2	0.0	0.0	0.0	0.0	1.3	5.7	10.2	43.4
Source: NOAA

Climate data for Williston, North Dakota (1991–2020 normals, (Note: Mean monthly maxima and minima (i.e. the expected highest and lowest temperature readings at any point during the year or given month) calculated based on data at said location from 1991 to 2020.) extremes 1894–present (Note: Official records for Williston kept at the Weather Bureau Office from January 1894 to June 1948, Sloulin Field International Airport from July 1948 until October 22, 2019, and the new Williston Basin Int'l since October 23, 2019.)
Month	Jan	Feb	Mar	Apr	May	Jun	Jul	Aug	Sep	Oct	Nov	Dec	Year
Record high °F (°C)	58 (14)	66 (19)	84 (29)	92 (33)	106 (41)	108 (42)	110 (43)	108 (42)	104 (40)	93 (34)	76 (24)	63 (17)	110 (43)
Mean maximum °F (°C)	44.0 (6.7)	46.7 (8.2)	65.1 (18.4)	79.0 (26.1)	86.6 (30.3)	93.5 (34.2)	98.0 (36.7)	98.9 (37.2)	93.3 (34.1)	80.3 (26.8)	60.4 (15.8)	46.1 (7.8)	100.6 (38.1)
Mean daily maximum °F (°C)	22.1 (−5.5)	26.7 (−2.9)	40.1 (4.5)	55.6 (13.1)	67.4 (19.7)	76.7 (24.8)	84.5 (29.2)	83.9 (28.8)	72.6 (22.6)	55.9 (13.3)	38.4 (3.6)	26.1 (−3.3)	54.2 (12.3)
Daily mean °F (°C)	11.6 (−11.3)	16.1 (−8.8)	28.8 (−1.8)	42.4 (5.8)	53.8 (12.1)	63.5 (17.5)	70.4 (21.3)	69.0 (20.6)	58.0 (14.4)	43.2 (6.2)	27.8 (−2.3)	16.1 (−8.8)	41.7 (5.4)
Mean daily minimum °F (°C)	1.0 (−17.2)	5.5 (−14.7)	17.5 (−8.1)	29.2 (−1.6)	40.2 (4.6)	50.2 (10.1)	56.3 (13.5)	54.0 (12.2)	43.5 (6.4)	30.4 (−0.9)	17.1 (−8.3)	6.1 (−14.4)	29.3 (−1.5)
Mean minimum °F (°C)	−25.8 (−32.1)	−19.5 (−28.6)	−7.6 (−22.0)	12.6 (−10.8)	24.4 (−4.2)	37.5 (3.1)	45.1 (7.3)	40.9 (4.9)	27.2 (−2.7)	12.0 (−11.1)	−4.6 (−20.3)	−19.8 (−28.8)	−29.2 (−34.0)
Record low °F (°C)	−42 (−41)	−50 (−46)	−35 (−37)	−15 (−26)	10 (−12)	26 (−3)	34 (1)	32 (0)	13 (−11)	−9 (−23)	−27 (−33)	−50 (−46)	−50 (−46)
Average precipitation inches (mm)	0.56 (14)	0.48 (12)	0.63 (16)	1.05 (27)	2.10 (53)	2.64 (67)	2.48 (63)	1.57 (40)	1.36 (35)	0.94 (24)	0.67 (17)	0.63 (16)	15.11 (384)
Average snowfall inches (cm)	11.2 (28)	6.7 (17)	6.4 (16)	3.7 (9.4)	0.9 (2.3)	0.0 (0.0)	0.0 (0.0)	0.0 (0.0)	0.0 (0.0)	2.6 (6.6)	6.3 (16)	10.4 (26)	48.2 (122)
Average precipitation days (≥ 0.01 in)	7.6	7.1	7.4	8.3	9.9	12.3	9.2	8.7	7.5	6.9	6.8	8.5	100.2
Average snowy days (≥ 0.1 in)	9.8	6.9	6.0	2.7	0.9	0.0	0.0	0.0	0.0	1.9	5.8	8.8	42.8
Average relative humidity (%)	71.3	75.6	72.5	61.4	58.5	59.6	56.1	54.9	61.1	65.2	74.9	77.1	66.1
Average dew point °F (°C)	3.4 (−15.9)	10.0 (−12.2)	19.9 (−6.7)	28.6 (−1.9)	38.8 (3.8)	48.6 (9.2)	52.2 (11.2)	49.5 (9.7)	41.2 (5.1)	31.1 (−0.5)	19.6 (−6.9)	7.5 (−13.6)	29.2 (−1.6)
Mean monthly sunshine hours	144.5	169.7	227.3	250.3	297.9	326.0	366.3	331.5	249.5	197.1	122.2	125.5	2,807.8
Percentage possible sunshine	53	59	62	61	63	68	76	75	66	59	44	48	63
Source: NOAA (relative humidity and dew point 1962–1990, sun 1961–1990) (Note: Only 22 to 24 years out of the 29 in the normals period were used to calculate the humidity normals.)

== Seasons ==
Winter in North Dakota is characterized by cold (below freezing) temperatures and snowfall. Snow is the main form of winter precipitation, but freezing rain, ice, sleet, and sometimes even rain are all possible during the winter months. Common storm systems include Alberta clippers or Panhandle hooks, some of which evolve into blizzards. Annual snowfall averages from 26 inches (66 cm) in the central part of the state to 38 inches (96.5 cm) in the northeast and southwest. Temperatures as low as −60 °F (−51 °C) have occurred during North Dakota winters.

Spring is a time of major transition in North Dakota. Early spring commonly sees snowstorms, but by late spring as temperatures begin to moderate the state can experience tornado outbreaks, a risk which diminishes but does not cease through the summer and into the fall as North Dakota lies at the northern edge of Tornado Alley. Springtime flooding is a relatively common event in the Red River Valley, due to the river flowing north into Canada. The spring melt and the eventual runoff typically begins earlier in the southern part of the valley than in the northern part. The most destructive flooding in eastern North Dakota occurred in 1997, which caused extensive damage to Grand Forks.

Summer sees heat and humidity predominate in the east, while hotter and less humid conditions are generally present in the west. These humid conditions help kick off thunderstorm activity 22–34 days a year. Summer high temperatures in North Dakota average in the mid 80s °F (30 °C) in the west to the upper 70s °F (25-26 °C) in the east, with temperatures as hot as 121 °F (49 °C) possible. The growing season in North Dakota usually begins in April, and harvest begins in September and October. Tornadoes are possible in North Dakota from April through October, but the peak tornado month is July, followed by June and August. The state averages 13 tornadoes per year. Depending on location, average annual precipitation ranges from 14 in (35.6 cm) to 22 in (55.9 cm).

Autumn weather in North Dakota is largely the reverse of spring weather. The jet stream, which tends to weaken in summer, begins to re-strengthen, leading to a quicker changing of weather patterns and an increased variability of temperatures. By late October and November these storm systems become strong enough to form major winter storms. Fall and spring are the windiest times of the year in North Dakota.

== Extreme weather ==
2017 Drought As of September 2017, the United States Drought Monitor recorded abnormally dry weather conditions across the entire state. The drought is considered severe and unprecedented, and because of its nature as a "unpredictable, sudden event brought on by sustained high temperatures and little rain" leading to a rapid drop in soil moisture, it is considered a “flash drought”. North Dakota Agriculture Commissioner Doug Goehring announced that predicted economic losses as a consequence from the drought could amount to as much as $4 billion or $5 billion.

Climatic and Hydrologic Aspects of the 1988-1992 Drought The 1988-92 drought was the second most severe drought 1930-1992

The Great Drought Drought struck down North Dakota in the 1930’s. Nine of the eleven years from 1929 through 1939 had less than average rainfall. June, 1929, was one of the driest Junes on record;

2011 Statewide Floods U.S. Geological Survey recorded 22 record crests state-wide in 2011

1997 Red River flood The Red River flood of 1997 was a major flood that occurred in April and May 1997 along the Red River of the North in Minnesota, North Dakota, and southern Manitoba. It was the most severe flood of the river since 1826.

1997 April Blizzard 20 years ago (April 4–7, 1997) North Dakota was hit with a Major Blizzard, bringing much of the state to a complete halt. Heavy snowfall (as much as 2 feet in some areas), and winds to 65 MPH, resulted in widespread impacts. This included 100,000 head of cattle killed (10% of the state herd), widespread power outages, and stranded numerous motorists. Damages totaled just under 45 million dollars. The additional snow at Bismarck (17.5 inches), brought the season snowfall total to 101.4 inches. This set an all-time seasonal snowfall record for Bismarck, which still stands today.

Blizzard of March 2-5, 1966 One of the most severe blizzards on record to impact the Northern Plains occurred 50 years ago between March 2–5 of 1966. The blizzard was particularly memorable for its long duration, as well as for its very heavy snowfall totals of 20 to 30 inches in some locations and wind gusts exceeding 70 mph at times. Snowfall totals reached as high as 38 inches, with drifts 30 to 40 feet high in some locations.

1996-1997 Record Snowfall Back in December of ’96, we had four days that it didn’t snow,” By the end of the November, just over 26 inches of snow had fallen in Fargo. Two Major storms in Nov. By the end of the December, another 20 inches of snow had fallen, pushing the season total to over 46 inches. One official blizzard in Dec. Keith Malakowsky: “Back in December of ’96, we had four days that it didn’t snow,” Three official blizzards in January. By the end of January the season’s total was just over 75 inches. February ended with season total of 83.4 inches falling in total. March had a blizzard and couple heavy snows. At the end of March, nearly 110 inches had fallen. April blizzard and when the last flake had fallen, the total snowfall in Fargo was 117 inches for the year.

Winter of 1935-1936 and 1936 Cold Wave The meteorological winter (December through February) of 1935/36 was the coldest on record for North Dakota. February 1936 was the coldest February on record in the contiguous U.S., narrowly eclipsing February 1899. It also was the coldest month ever in North Dakota.

1936 Heat Wave The climatological summer June–August 1936 remains the warmest nationwide on record since 1895 with an average temperature of 74.0 °F. The second warmest summer was that of 2012 with an average of 73.7 °F. North Dakota set its all time record high of 121 Steele July 6. Bismarck recorded a low of just 83 °F on July 11.

Cold Wave of 1996 Dangerously cold weather once again hit North Dakota. The town of Rolette(Rolette Co.) in north central North Dakota reported a morning low of 53 below. Many places reported lows from 35 to 45 below. Fargo tied its record low of 39 below . The temperature at Fargo remained at or below zero for 11 straight days(1/23/96-2/3/96). This ties the second longest subzero period, previously set in 1899. Daytime highs fared no better, as Bismarck reached a high of 26 below. Northwest winds up to 30 mph created wind chills to 100 below.

February 2019 The official state average February temperature was −2.9 °F or −19.4 °C. 2019 was the second coldest February in the 125-year period of record, and the coldest since 1936.

North Dakota Severe Weather History this link includes the number of tornadoes by county 1950-2021. Severity of tornadoes by county 1950-2021. Strength of non tornadic winds by county. Largest hail size reported by county. Number of tornadoes by year from 2011-2021 by county.

== See also ==
- Meteorology
- Weather lore
