= List of school districts in North Dakota =

This is a list of school districts in North Dakota, grouped by county.

All school districts in the state are individual governments. The state does not have K-12 school systems dependent on another layer of government.

== History ==
In the 1998-1999 school year, the state had 221 school districts with 113,300 students. In January 2007, the number of school districts had declined to 195, and these districts had a total of 95,600 students. The eight largest school districts, which had 48,900 of those students, had their combined enrollment decline by 8% from 1998-1999 to 2006-2007. The remaining districts lost 23% of their students from 1998-1999 to 2006-2007.

=== Adams County ===
- Hettinger Public School District

=== Barnes County ===
- Barnes County North School District
- Oriska Public School District
- Valley City Public School District

=== Benson County ===
- Leeds Public School District
- Fort Totten Public School District
- Maddock Public School District
- Minnewaukan Public School District
- Oberon Public School District
- Warwick Public School District

=== Billings County ===
- Billings County Public School District 1

=== Bottineau County ===
- Bottineau Public Schools
- Newburg-United Public School District
- Westhope Public School District
- Willow City Public School District

=== Bowman County ===
- Bowman County Public School District 1
- Scranton Public School District

=== Burke County ===
- Bowbells Public School District 14
- Burke Central Public School District 36
- Powers Lake Public School District

=== Burleigh County ===
- Apple Creek Public School District 39
- Bismarck Public School District 1
- Bismarck Special Education Unit
- Bismarck Technical Center
- Burleigh County Special Education Unit
- Driscoll Public School District
- Manning Public School District
- McKenzie Public School District
- Menoken Public School District
- Naughton Public School District
- Regan Public School District
- Sterling Public School District
- Wing Public School District

=== Cass County ===
- Central Cass Public School District
- Fargo Public Schools
- Kindred Public School District
- Maple Valley Public School District
- Mapleton Public School District
- Northern Cass Public School District
- West Fargo Public Schools

=== Cavalier County ===
- Border Central Public School District
- Langdon Area Public School District
- Milton Public School District
- Munich Public School District
- Osnabrock Public School District

=== Dickey County ===
- Ellendale Public School District
- Oakes Public School District

=== Divide County ===
- Divide County Public School District

=== Dunn County ===
- Dodge Public School District
- Halliday Public School District
- Killdeer Public School District
- Twin Buttes Public School District

=== Eddy County ===
- East Central Special Education District
- New Rockford-Sheyenne Public School District

=== Emmons County ===
- Bakker Public School District 10
- Hazelton-Moffit-Braddock Public School District
- Linton Public School District
- Strasburg Public School District

=== Foster County ===
- Carrington Public Schools
- Midkota Public School District 7

=== Golden Valley County ===
- Beach Public School District 3
- Lone Tree Public School District

=== Grand Forks County ===
- Emerado Public School District
- Grand Forks Public School District
- Larimore Public School District
- Manvel Public School District
- Midway Public School District
- Northwood Public School District
- Thompson Public School District

=== Grant County ===
- Elgin-New Leipzig Public School District
- Roosevelt Public School District

=== Griggs County ===
- Griggs County Central Public School District

=== Hettinger County ===
- Mott-Regent Public School District
- New England Public School District

=== Kidder County ===
- Steele-Dawson Public School District
- Robinson Public School District
- Tappen Public School District
- Tuttle-Pettibone Public School District

=== LaMoure County ===
- Edgeley Public School District
- Kulm Public School District
- LaMoure Public Schools
- Litchville-Marion Public School District

=== Logan County ===
- Gackle-Streeter Public School District
- Napoleon Public School District
- South Prairie Special Education District

=== McHenry County ===
- Anamoose Public School District 14
- Drake Public School District
- Granville Public School District
- Newport Public School District
- TGU Public School District
- Upham Public School District
- Velva Public School District

=== McIntosh County ===
- Ashley Public School District 9
- Wishek Public School District
- Zeeland Public School District

=== McKenzie County ===
- Alexander Public School District 2
- Bowline Butte Public School District
- Horse Creek Public School District
- Mandaree Public School District
- McKenzie Co Public School District
- Yellowstone Public School District

=== McLean County ===
- Butte Public School District
- Garrison Public School District
- Max Public School District
- Montefiore Public School District
- Turtle Lake-Mercer Public School District
- Underwood Public School
- Washburn Public School District
- White Shield Public School District
- Wilton Public School District

=== Mercer County ===
- Beulah Public School District 27
- Golden Valley Public School District
- Hazen Public School District
- Stanton Public School District

=== Morton County ===
- Flasher Public School District
- Glen Ullin Public School District
- Hebron Public School District
- Little Heart Public School District
- Mandan Public School District
- New Salem Public School District
- Sweet Briar Public School District

=== Mountrail County ===
- New Town Public School District
- Parshall Public School District
- Plaza Public School District
- Stanley Public School District

=== Nelson County ===
- Dakota Prairie Public School District
- Lakota Public School District

=== Oliver County ===
- Center-Stanton Public School District

=== Pembina County ===
- Cavalier Public School District
- Drayton Public School District
- Neche Public School District
- Pembina Public School District
- Saint Thomas Public School District
- Valley Public School District
- Walhalla Public School District

=== Pierce County ===
- Rugby Public School District

=== Ramsey County ===
- Devils Lake Public School District
- Edmore Public School District
- Starkweather Public School District

=== Ransom County ===
- Enderlin Public School District
- Fort Ransom Public School District
- Lisbon Public School District
- Salund Public School District
- Sheldon Public School District

=== Renville County ===
- Glenburn Public School District
- Mohall Lansford Sherwood School District

=== Richland County ===
- Fairmount Public School District
- Hankinson Public School District
- Lidgerwood Public School District
- Mantador Public School District
- Richland Public School District
- Wahpeton Public School District
- Wyndmere Public School District

=== Rolette County ===
- Dunseith Public School District
- Mount Pleasant Public School District
- Rolette Public School District
- Saint John Public School District
- Belcourt Public School District 7

=== Sargent County ===
- Milnor Public School District
- North Sargent Public School District
- Sargent Central Public School District

=== Sheridan County ===
- Goodrich Public School District
- McClusky School District

=== Sioux County ===
- Fort Yates Public School District
- Selfridge Public School District
- Solen Public School District

=== Slope County ===
- Marmarth Public School District

=== Stark County ===
- Belfield Public School District 13
- Dickinson Public Schools
- Richardton-Taylor Public School District
- South Heart Public School District

=== Steele County ===
- Finley-Sharon Public School District
- Hope-Page Public Schools

=== Stutsman County ===
- Buffalo Valley Special Education Unit
- Jamestown Public Schools
- Kensal Public School District
- Medina Public School District
- Montpelier Public School District
- Pingree-Buchanan Public School District
- Spiritwood Public School District

=== Towner County ===
- North Star Schools
- Southern Public School District

=== Traill County ===
- Central Valley Public School District
- Hatton Public School District
- Hillsboro Public School District
- May-Port CG Public School District

=== Walsh County ===
- Edinburg Public School District
- Fordville-Lankin Public School District
- Grafton Public School District
- Minto Public School District
- Nash Public School District
- Park River Public School District

=== Ward County ===
- Bell Public School District 10
- Eureka Public School District
- Kenmare Public School District
- Lewis and Clark Public School District
- Minot Public School District
- Nedrose Public School District
- North Shore Public School District
- Sawyer Public School District
- Surrey Public School District
- United Public School District

=== Wells County ===
- Fessenden-Bowdon Public School District
- Harvey Public Schools
- Pleasant Valley Public School District

=== Williams County ===
- Eight Mile Public School District
- Grenora Public School District
- Nesson Public School District
- Tioga Public School District
- Wildrose-Alamo Public School District
- Williston Basin School District 7

== See also ==
- List of high schools in North Dakota
- List of defunct high schools in North Dakota
- List of high schools in the United States
