= Coat of arms of North Dakota =

Coat of arms of the State of North Dakota

Versions
- Flag of the governor of North Dakota
- Armiger: State of North Dakota
- Adopted: 1957
- Crest: On a wreath Or and azure, a sheaf of three arrows argent armed and flighted gules behind a stringed bow fessways Or with grip of the second.
- Shield: Or a bend vert charged with three mullets of the first, in base a fleur-de-lis of the second.
- Motto: Strength From The Soil

The coat of arms of North Dakota was created for use by the state government and National Guard units. An image of the coat of arms is seen on the flag of the governor of North Dakota and a short discussion of its use can be found at the North Dakota state government website.

== Heraldic description ==
Section 54-41-01 of the North Dakota Century Code specifies the design (blazon) of the coat of arms thus;

Device: On an Indian arrowhead point to base Or a bend vert charged with three mullets of the first, in base a fleur-de-lis of the second.
Crest: On a wreath Or and azure, a sheaf of three arrows argent armed and flighted gules behind a stringed bow fessways Or with grip of the second (gules).
Motto: Strength from the soil.

== Allusions ==
The allusions made in the arms are laid down in section 54-41-02 NDCC:

The colors of yellow gold and green are indicative of the great agricultural state of North Dakota and has particular reference to ripening grain and the abundant grazing areas. The Indian arrowhead forms the shield of the coat of arms and symbolizes the "Sioux State." The three stars denote the trinity of government; legislative, executive, and judicial. Each star in the bend is given the heraldic value of thirteen which signifies the thirteen original colonies of the United States, and the cumulative numerical value of the three stars indicates that North Dakota was the thirty-ninth state admitted to the Union. The stars also allude to the history of the territory under three foreign flags. Three stars are borne upon the coat of arms of Meriwether Lewis of the Lewis and Clark expedition and also on the coat of arms of Lord Selkirk, head of the first permanent settlement in this state. The fleur-de-lis alludes to La Vérendrye, a North American French explorer who was the first known white man to visit the territory of this state. The blue and gold wreath in the crest reflects the history of the territory as part of the Louisiana purchase. The crest which shall constitute the military crest of the state of North Dakota is a motif taken from the state seal and to the Sioux Indian tribes signifies mighty warriors.

== Limits of use ==
Section 54-41-03 limits use of the symbol to the following:

- The governor of North Dakota
- The North Dakota National Guard
- Departments and agencies of the state of North Dakota
- North Dakota veterans organizations
- Officially recognized North Dakota educational institutions, systems, or divisions thereof
- Recognized North Dakota "patriotic organizations".

== Other uses ==
- The North Dakota Army National Guard uses the crest of the coat of arms as their shoulder sleeve insignia.
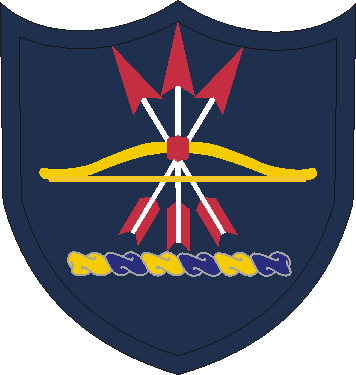
  NDNG shoulder insignia

== Gallery ==
Coat of arms of the Earl of Selkirk

Flag of New France

== See also ==
- Armorial of the United States
