= Constitution of North Dakota =

American state constitution

The Constitution of North Dakota is the most basic legal document in the U.S. state of North Dakota. It consists of a preamble and fourteen articles.

== History ==
In recent years, North Dakota's constitution has been amended several times. Among these amendments was a 2012 revision to legally mandate the administration of oaths to state officers. The amendment was created because an elderly man named John Rolczynski, who lives in Grand Forks, North Dakota, discovered an error that made North Dakota's statehood illegitimate. In 2016, North Dakota voters guaranteed certain rights to crime victims. In 2018, the voters added a new article creating an ethics commission responsible for adopting rules relating to transparency, corruption, elections, and lobbying, and for investigating alleged violations of those rules.

In 2022, voters in the state approved an amendment that limits the governor, state representatives, and senators in the Legislative Assembly to two four-year terms. The amendment only applies to individuals elected after January 1, 2023. In May 2023, an attempt began to change this limit to three terms, and allow affected politicians to run again after four years.

== Amendment ==
Amendments to the North Dakota Constitution have always required the approval of a majority of voters. Between 1889 and 1914, the power to propose amendments to the Constitution rested with the North Dakota Legislative Assembly. In 1914, the voter constitutional initiative was introduced, and between 1914 and 2012, 74 initiated amendments were considered by North Dakota voters.

North Dakota held a constitutional convention in 1889. Since it was adopted on October 1, 1889, the Constitution of North Dakota has been amended 164 times.

In 1970, North Dakota voters approved calling a constitutional convention. The convention drafted a new constitution, but it was rejected by the voters in the 1972 ballot.
