= List of North Dakota companies =

Location of North Dakota

North Dakota is a state in the Midwestern United States. The development of the region's Bakken formation has led to an oil boom economy and produced one of the lowest unemployment rates in the United States and renewed population growth in the state. Oil and gas is now the state's largest contributor to the economy, replacing the agricultural sector.

== Largest firms ==
This list shows firms in the Fortune 500, which ranks firms by total revenues reported before January 31, 2018. Only the top five firms (if available) are included as a sample.

Rank	Image	Name	Revenues (USD $M)	Employees	Notes
560		MDU Resources	4,443	10,140	Integrated gas and electrical utility, including distribution and pipelines. The firm is also a provider of infrastructure development.

== Notable firms ==
This list includes notable companies with primary headquarters located in the state. The industry and sector follow the Industry Classification Benchmark taxonomy. Organizations which have ceased operations are included and noted as defunct.

Notable companies Status: P=Private, S=State; A=Active, D=Defunct
Name	Industry	Sector	Headquarters	Founded	Notes	Status	
Acme Tools	Consumer services	Tool & equipment distributor	Grand Forks	1948		P	A
Alerus Financial	Financials	Banks	Grand Forks	1879	Bank and financial services	P	A
Bank of North Dakota	Financials	Banks	Bismarck	1919	State-owned bank	S	A
Basin Safety Consulting Corporation	Industrials	Business support services	Williston	2012	Health and safety consulting	P	A
Bell Bank	Financials	Banks	Fargo	1966	Bank	P	A
Blue Flint Ethanol	Utilities	Alternative electricity	Underwood	1974	Bioethanol plant	P	A
Bobcat Company	Industrials	Commercial vehicles & trucks	West Fargo	1947	Farm and construction equipment	P	A
Burger Time	Consumer services	Restaurants & bars	West Fargo	1987	Fast food chain	P	A
Cass-Clay	Consumer goods	Food products	Fargo	1934	Dairy	P	A
Cobray Company	Industrials	Defense	Westhope	1964	Firearms, defunct	P	D
Dakota Growers	Consumer goods	Farming & fishing	Carrington	1990	Agricultural processing	P	A
Eide Bailly LLP	Industrials	Financial administration	Fargo	1917	Accounting	P	A
Fargo Bridge & Iron Co.	Industrials	Construction	Fargo	1898	Bridge construction company	P	D
First International Bank	Financials	Banks	Watford City	1910	Bank	P	A
Forum Communications Company	Consumer services	Publishing	Fargo	1878	Newspapers	P	A
Gate City Bank	Financials	Banks	Fargo	1923	Bank	P	A
Haxby & Gillespie	Industrials	Business support services	Fargo	1906	Architecture, defunct	P	D
Hebron Brick Company	Industrials	Building materials & fixtures	West Fargo	1904	Bricks	P	A
Home of Economy	Consumer services	Broadline retailers	Grand Forks	1939	Retail chain	P	A
Hornbacher's	Consumer services	Food retailers & wholesalers	Fargo	1951	Supermarket chain	P	A
Hugo's	Consumer services	Food retailers & wholesalers	Grand Forks	1939	Supermarket chain	P	A
JLG Architects	Industrials	Business support services	Grand Forks	1989	Architects	P	A
The Kegs Drive-In	Consumer services	Restaurants & bars	Grand Forks	1946	Restaurant	P	A
McKenzie Electric Cooperative	Utilities	Conventional electricity	Watford City	1945	Electrical cooperative	P	A
McLean Electric Cooperative	Utilities	Conventional electricity	Garrison	1945	Electrical cooperative	P	A
MDU Resources	Industrials	Diversified industrials	Bismarck	1924	Power, gas, construction	P	A
NoDak Films	Consumer services	Broadcasting & entertainment	Minot	2010	Film production	P	A
Noridian Healthcare Solutions	Healthcare	Life insurance	Fargo	1966	Health/life insurance	P	A
North Dakota Mill and Elevator	Consumer goods	Food products	Grand Forks	1922	State-owned flour mill	S	A
Packet Digital	Technology	Semiconductors	Fargo	2003	Integrated circuit manufacturing	P	A
Pointe of View Winery	Consumer goods	Distillers & vintners	Burlington	2002	Winery	P	A
Pracs Institute	Health care	Biotechnology	Fargo	1983	Defunct 2013	P	D
Red River Broadcasting	Consumer services	Broadcasting & entertainment	Fargo	1980	Television	P	A
Scheels	Consumer services	Specialty retailers	Fargo	1902	Sporting goods retailer	P	A
Space Aliens Grill & Bar	Consumer services	Restaurants & bars	Bismarck	1997	Restaurant chain	P	A
SRT Communications	Telecommunications	Fixed line telecommunications	Minot	1951	Telecom cooperative	P	A
Straus Clothing	Consumer goods	Clothing & accessories	Fargo	1879	Defunct 2016	P	D
Swanson Health Products	Consumer services	Specialty retailers	Fargo	1969	Personal care products	P	A
Titan Machinery	Consumer services	Specialty retailers	Fargo	1980	Agricultural and construction equipment	P	A
Vanity	Consumer services	Apparel retailers	Fargo	1957	Fashion retailer, defunct 2017	P	D
The Vault	Consumer services	Restaurants & bars	Valley City	2009	Coffee shop	P	A

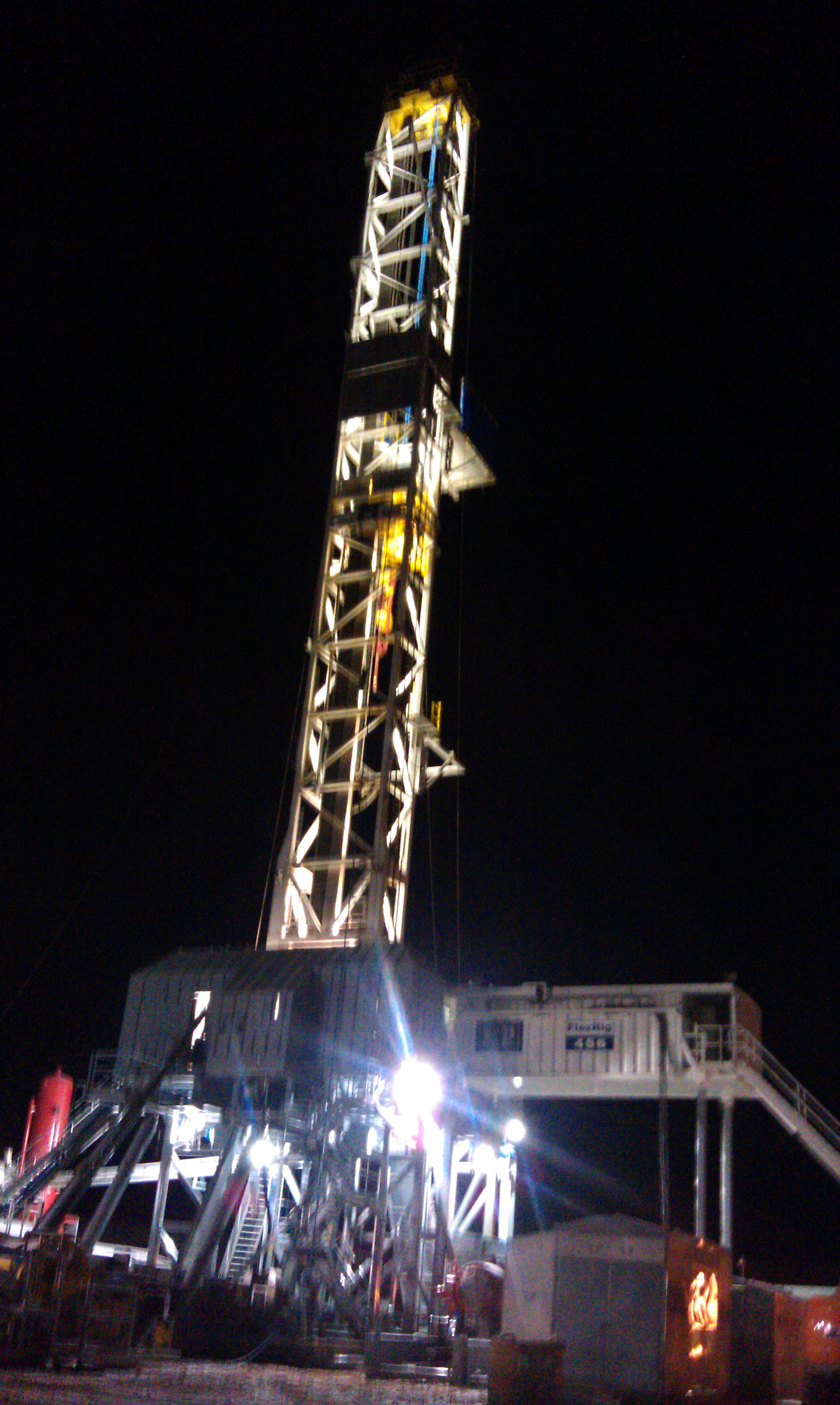
Night view of drilling in the Bakken formation

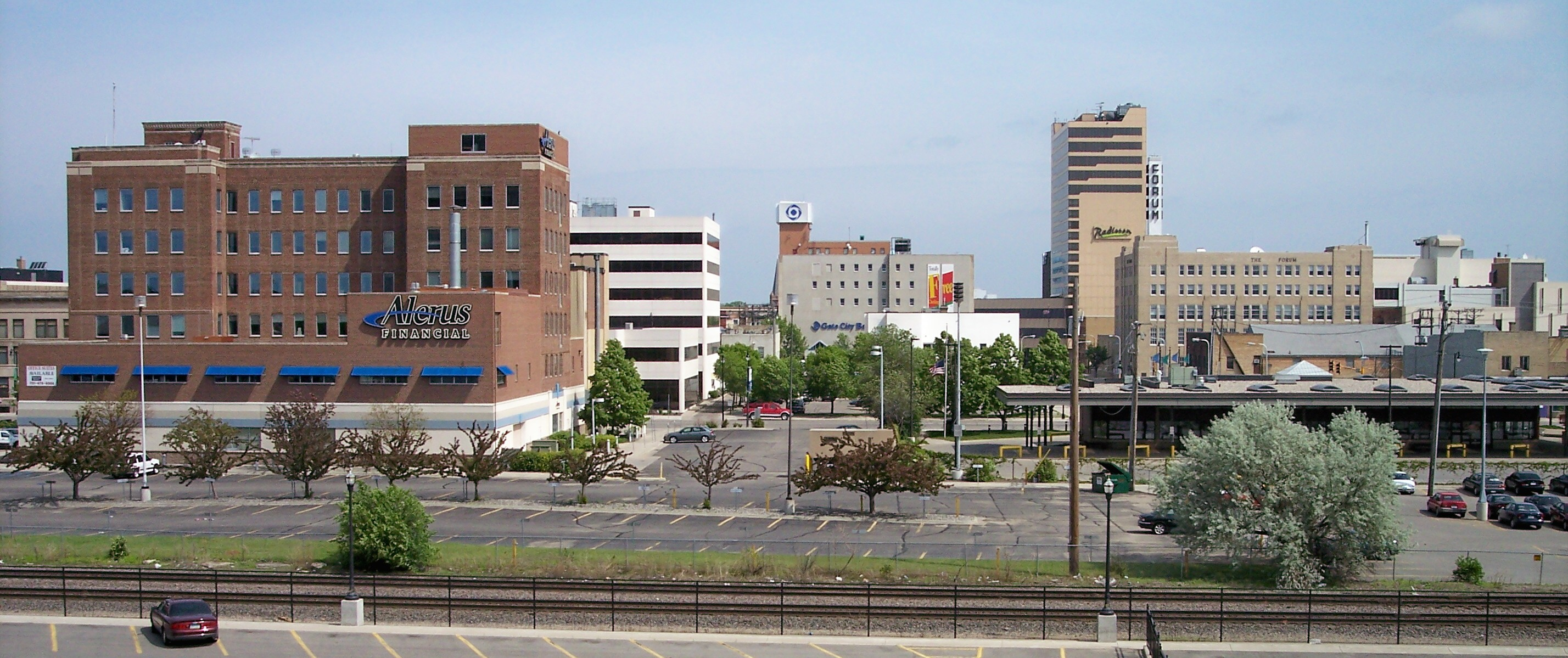
Downtown Fargo

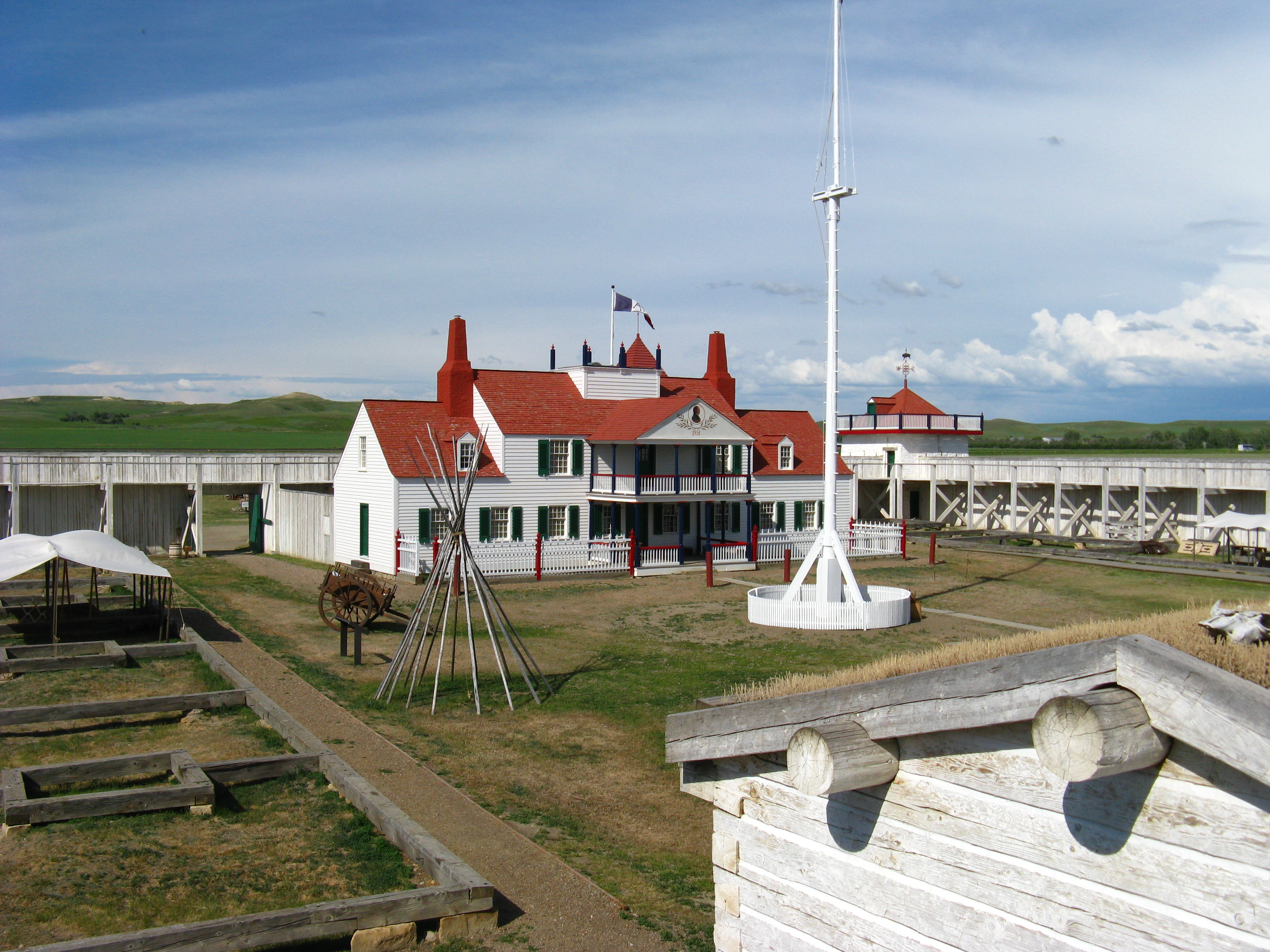
Fort Union Trading Post National Historic Site

== See also ==
- List of cities in North Dakota
