= McKenzie County Farmer =

Newspaper in Watford City, North Dakota

- Type: Weekly newspaper
- Format: Broadsheet
- Owner: Forum Communications Company
- Editor: Neal Shipman
- Founded: 1908; 118 years ago
- Language: English
- Headquarters: Watford City, North Dakota
- Website: watfordcitynd.com

The McKenzie County Farmer is a weekly newspaper published in Watford City, North Dakota, United States. It serves Watford City and McKenzie County.

== History ==
The paper originated as The Inland Call in Berg, North Dakota. In 1910, O.E. Roning announced the Call was for sale along with two other papers, The Weekly Press of Banks and the McKensie County Journal of Charlson. At some point Albert M. Young acquired the Call and Journal, and in 1911 sold them to S.Th. Westdal. Young resumed control of the Call after a year.

In March 1913, E.A. Minton acquired the Call and moved it from Berg to Arnegard. It was then acquired by H.O. Falkestad in June 1913, Mrs. Lee Jenkins in 1915, and the Nonpartisan League in 1917, who renamed the Arnegard Call to the McKenzie County Farmer. A year later Albert Van Dahl was hired to replace Jenkins as editor.

In 1928, the League acquired the Watford City Guide and absorbed it into the Farmer. The consolidated paper was then relocated from Arnegard to Watford City, and C.J. Carlson was named editor. In 1944, Julius C. Leiseth, a pressman formerly employed at The Record-Courier, became editor.

Fred A. Shipman took over four months later. In 1960, his son Delbert C. Shipman joined the staff. He eventually took over for his father as editor, and in 1968 was elected president of the North Dakota Press Association. In 1983, he retired and his son Neal A. Shipman succeeded him as editor. In 2000, D.C. Shipman died. N.A. Shipman sold the Farmer to Flag Family Media in 2022, which sold the paper to Forum Communications Company in 2026.
