= Watford City Air Force Station =

United States Air Force and Federal Aviation Administration installation in North Dakota

- Part of 1960-1967: Air Defense Command; 197x-present: Joint Surveillance System
- McKenzie County, North Dakota

Site information
- Type: FAA Ground Equipment Facility
- Owner: FAA
- Controlled by: Federal Aviation Administration

Location
- Coordinates: 47°40′44″N 103°46′50″W

Watford City Air Force Station is a joint United States Air Force and Federal Aviation Administration installation located about 40 km southwest of Watford City, North Dakota. It is the site of an ARSR-4 radar system, which provides air traffic surveillance along the US-Canada border, as well as limited weather radar data.

== History ==
Established as United States Air Force gap-filler station TM-177B (47°40′43″N 103°46′50″W) with an unmanned Bendix AN/FPS-18 Radar providing data through Dickinson Air Force Station/706th Aircraft Control and Warning (later Radar) Squadron (Minot AFS/786RS after Dickinson closed in 1965), the current facility was activated c. 1979 as a Joint Surveillance System facility with an Air Route Surveillance Radar.
