= First International Bank =

American bank founded in 1910

First International Bank & Trust
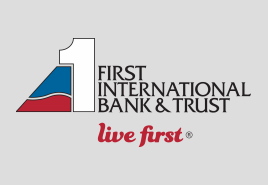
- Company type: Private
- Industry: Banking, Mortgage, Mineral & Land Services
- Founded: 1910
- Headquarters: Watford City, North Dakota
- Area served: Arizona; Minnesota; North Dakota; South Dakota
- Key people: Stephen Stenehjem (Chairman); Peter Stenehjem (Chief executive officer)
- Owners: Watford City Bancshares, Inc.
- Number of employees: 630
- Website: www.fibt.com

First International Bank & Trust (FIBT) is an American financial institution headquartered in Watford City, North Dakota. It is owned by Watford City Bancshares, Inc., which is owned by the Stenehjem family. FIBT is the largest bank in North Dakota and has locations in North Dakota, South Dakota, Minnesota, and Arizona.

== History ==
The bank was established in Arnegard, as the Farmers State Bank by Gerhard and Odin Stenehjem in 1910. It was the only one of 25 banks chartered in McKenzie County to survive the Great Depression; in 1934, it changed its name to First International Bank and moved its headquarters to Watford City, the county seat. Its conservative approach allowed the bank to endure the Depression and receive acclaim decades later; Money magazine named First International among the soundest financial institutions in America in 1989. In 1990, the bank acquired offices of Midwest Federal Savings & Loan offices in Williston, Killdeer, and Minot. The bank added trust powers in 1992 and modified its name accordingly; by 1996, it had expanded to Arizona with two locations.

Between 2004 and 2006, the bank built a new downtown headquarters in Watford City as part of a complex that included a movie theater and a steakhouse, two amenities that residents considered missing. The restaurant, Outlaws, was also run by the Stenehjem family. A second location of Outlaws opened in 2013 adjacent to the bank's relocated Williston branch.

In 2008, the bank expanded by purchasing First Integrity Bank of Staples, Minnesota, which was closed by the Federal Deposit Insurance Corporation; First International assumed all $50.3 million in First Integrity deposits.

FIBT's business saw a lift during the North Dakota oil boom. From 2007 to 2012, its deposits in McKenzie County alone grew 153 percent to $223.4 million. To alleviate a housing crunch, the company built duplexes and homes and rented apartments to employees. In one year, the bank hired 65 employees.

In April of 2018, First International Bank & Trust acquired Fargo-based electronic payments processor InterceptEFT. Upon the acquisition, the company was reintroduced as Kotapay and currently serves more than 107,000 customers across all 50 states.

The bank entered South Dakota in 2021 by acquiring Sodak Home Loans and opening a branch in Sioux Falls. FIBT also opened a location in Edina, marking the bank's entrance into the Twin Cities market.

On January 1, 2025, S. Peter Stenehjem succeeded his father, Stephen L. Stenehjem as CEO, marking the fourth generation of family leadership.
