= Case Construction Equipment =

American construction machine manufacturer

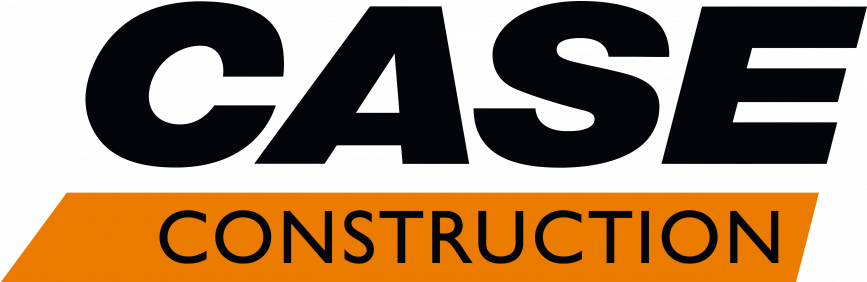
- Industry: Heavy equipment
- Founded: 1842 (184 years ago) in Racine, Wisconsin, United States
- Founder: Jerome Increase Case
- Headquarters: Turin, Italy
- Area served: Worldwide
- Parent: CNH Industrial
- Website: www.casece.com

Case Construction Equipment (stylized as CASE Construction Equipment, commonly referred to as simply Case) is an Italian-American manufacturer of construction machinery. Along with CASE IH, Case Construction Equipment is a brand of CNH. Case produces construction equipment including excavators, motor graders, wheel loaders, vibratory compaction rollers, crawler dozers, skid steers, and compact track loaders.

== Early history ==
The origins of Case date to 1842, when Jerome Increase Case (born in 1819) created Racine Threshing Machine Works in Racine, Wisconsin. The company produced its first portable steam engine in 1876, which is now on display at the Smithsonian Institution.

In 1957 Case made the 320 Construction King backhoe loader. Since 1969 Case has manufactured skid steers, starting in Burlington, Iowa and later moving production to Wichita.

== Recent history ==
The company evolved into the Case Corporation, which merged with New Holland in 1999 to become CNH Global which in 2011 became CNH Industrial.

- 2005: Case made its 500,000th backhoe loader and in 2010 made its 250,000th skid steer loader.
- 2016: Case released the new G-Series wheel loader lineup consisting of seven new models from 521G thru 1121G.
- 2017: In its 175th year in business, Case announced its facility in Wichita produced its 300,000th skid-steer loader.
- 2017: At Conexpo-Con/Agg 2017 Case released the CX750D excavator.

As of May 2017, according to Trade Arabia, Case "sells a full line of construction equipment around the world, including the number one loader/backhoes, excavators, motor graders, wheel loaders, vibratory compaction rollers, crawler dozers, skid steers, compact track loaders and rough-terrain forklifts."

== Products ==
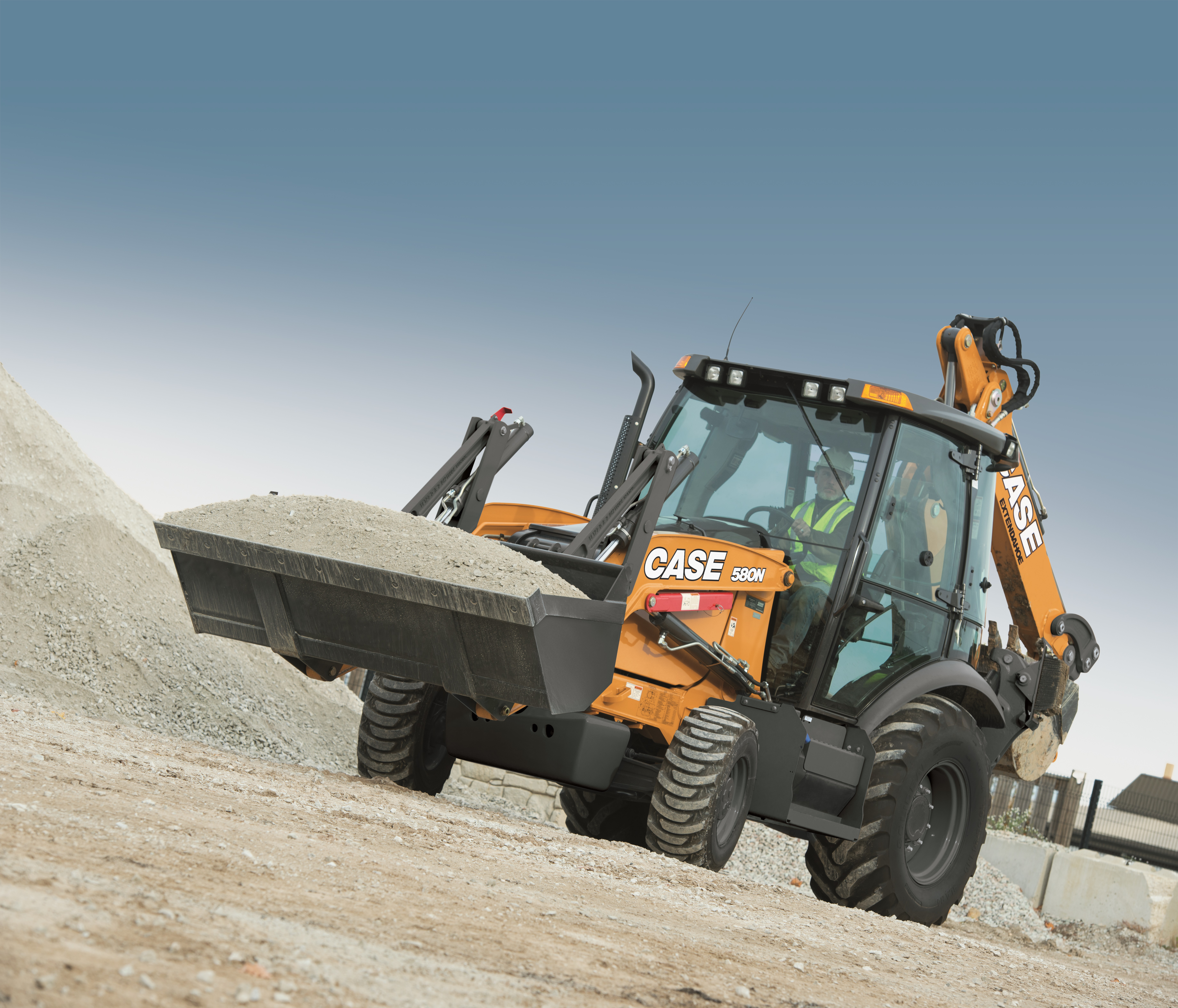
CASE 580N tractor loader backhoe.

Case was the first company to introduce the factory-integrated backhoe loader. In February 2017, the firm released an upgraded backhoe loader in Europe, which meets the Stage IV/Tier 4 Final emissions regulations.

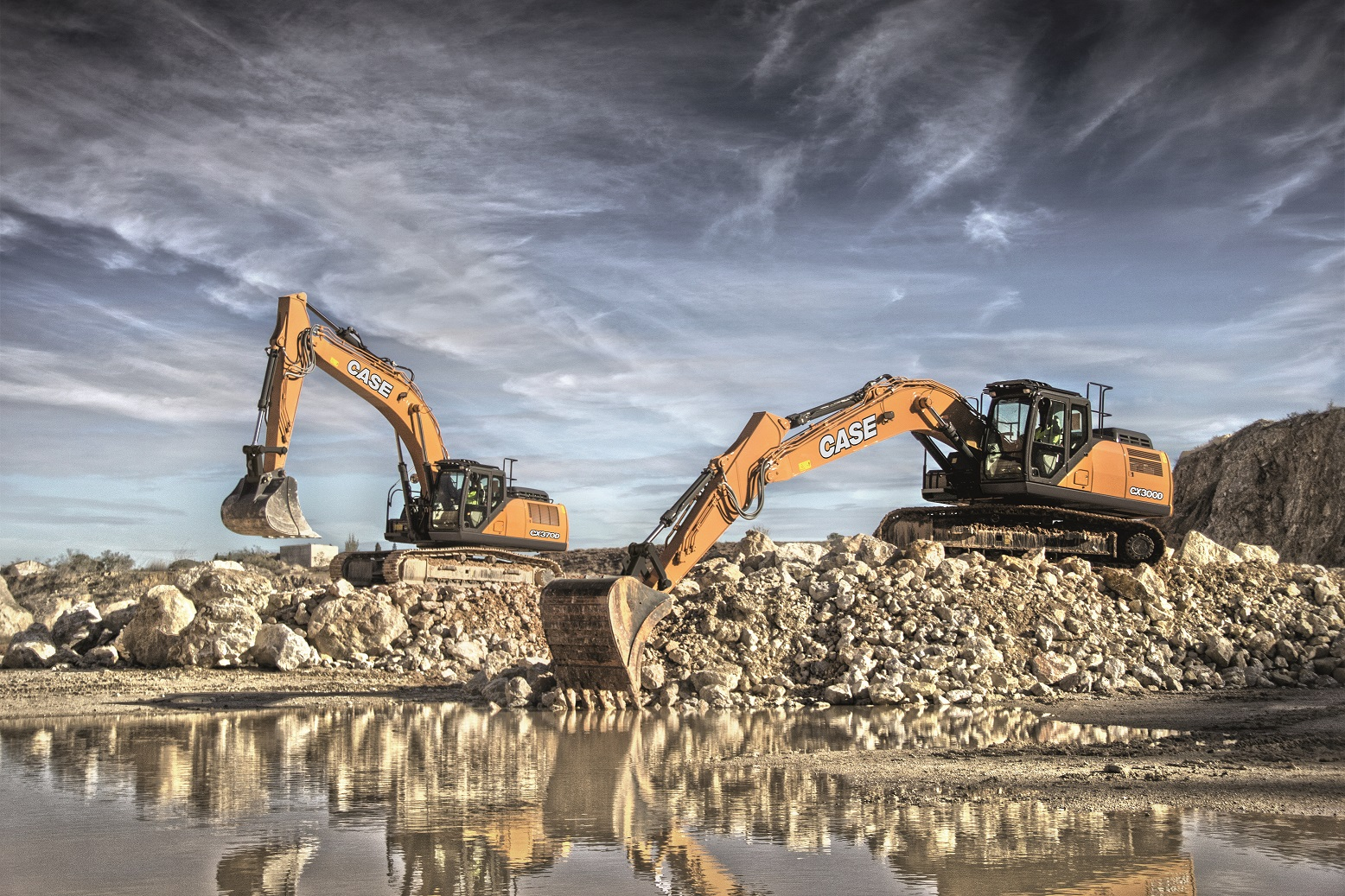
CASE CX300D and CX370D crawler excavators.

In 2017, Case introduced the CX750D Excavator, the 'largest and most powerful machine in the CASE excavator line' according to Construction Equipment Guide.

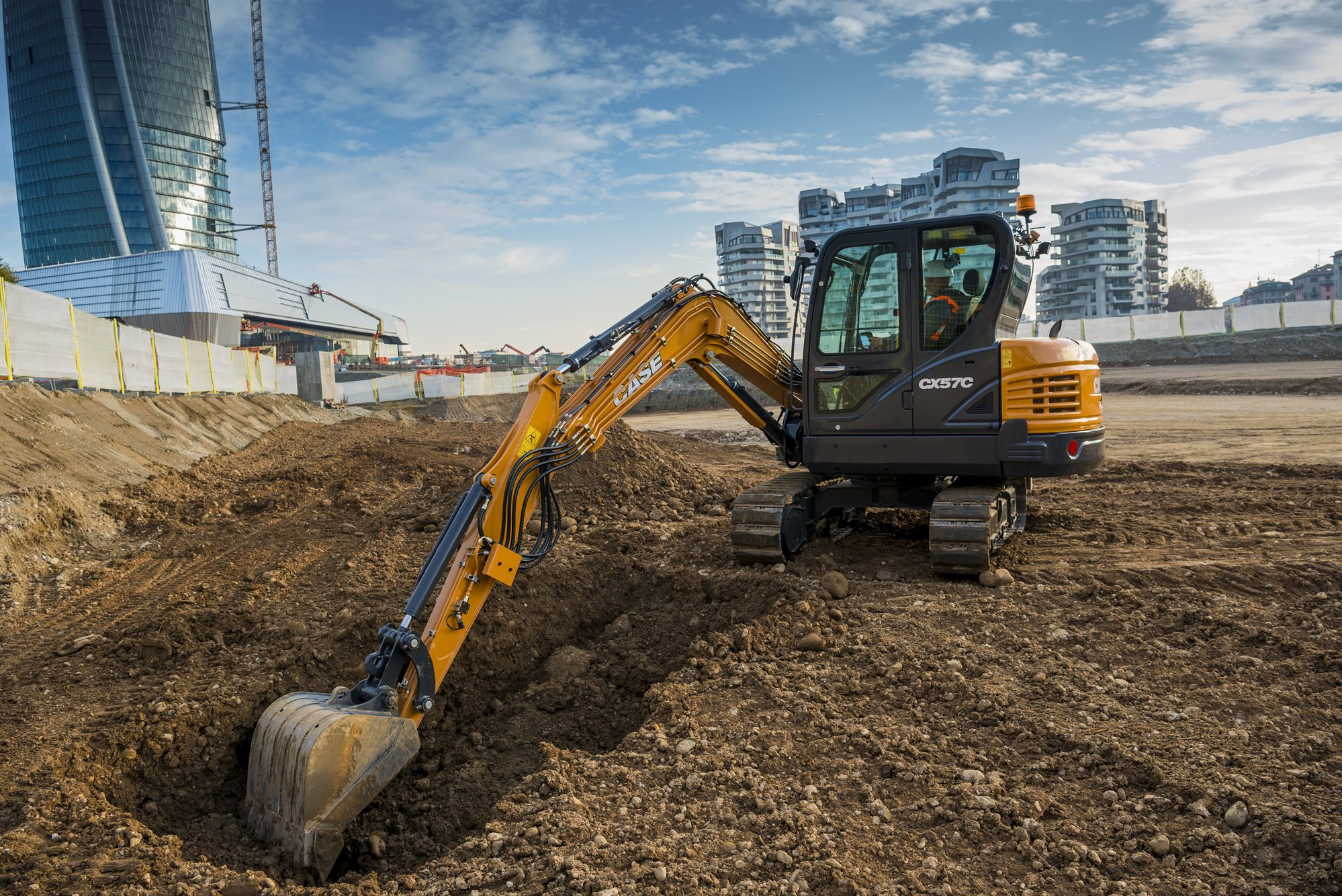
CASE CX37C mini excavator.

Case also produces mini excavators.

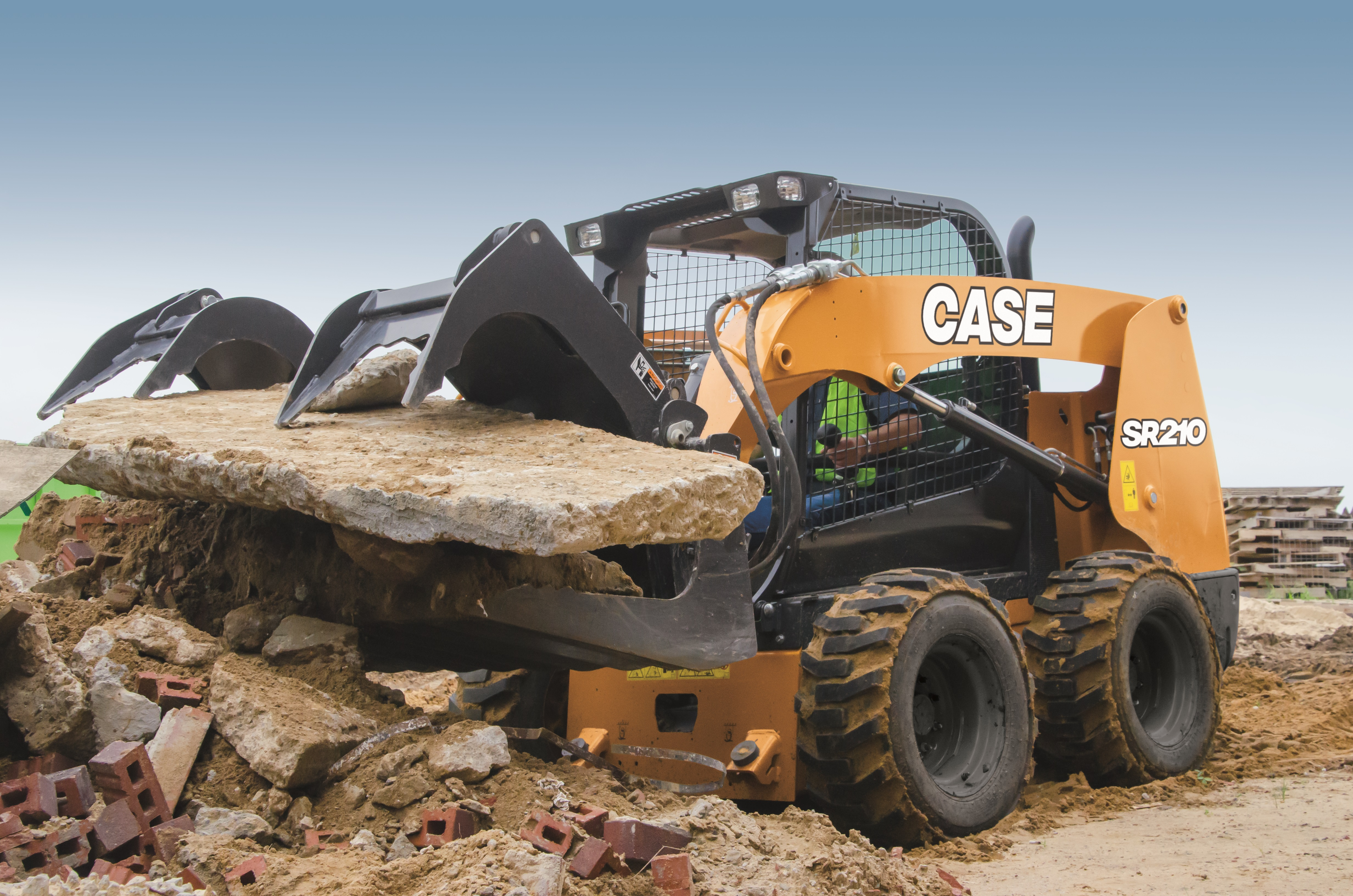
CASE SR210 skid steer loader.

Case builds and sells skid-steer loaders, used on construction sites. Such loaders are small in size, engine powered with lift arms, and fitted with labor-saving tools. Case skid-steer loaders are manufactured in Wichita, Kansas.

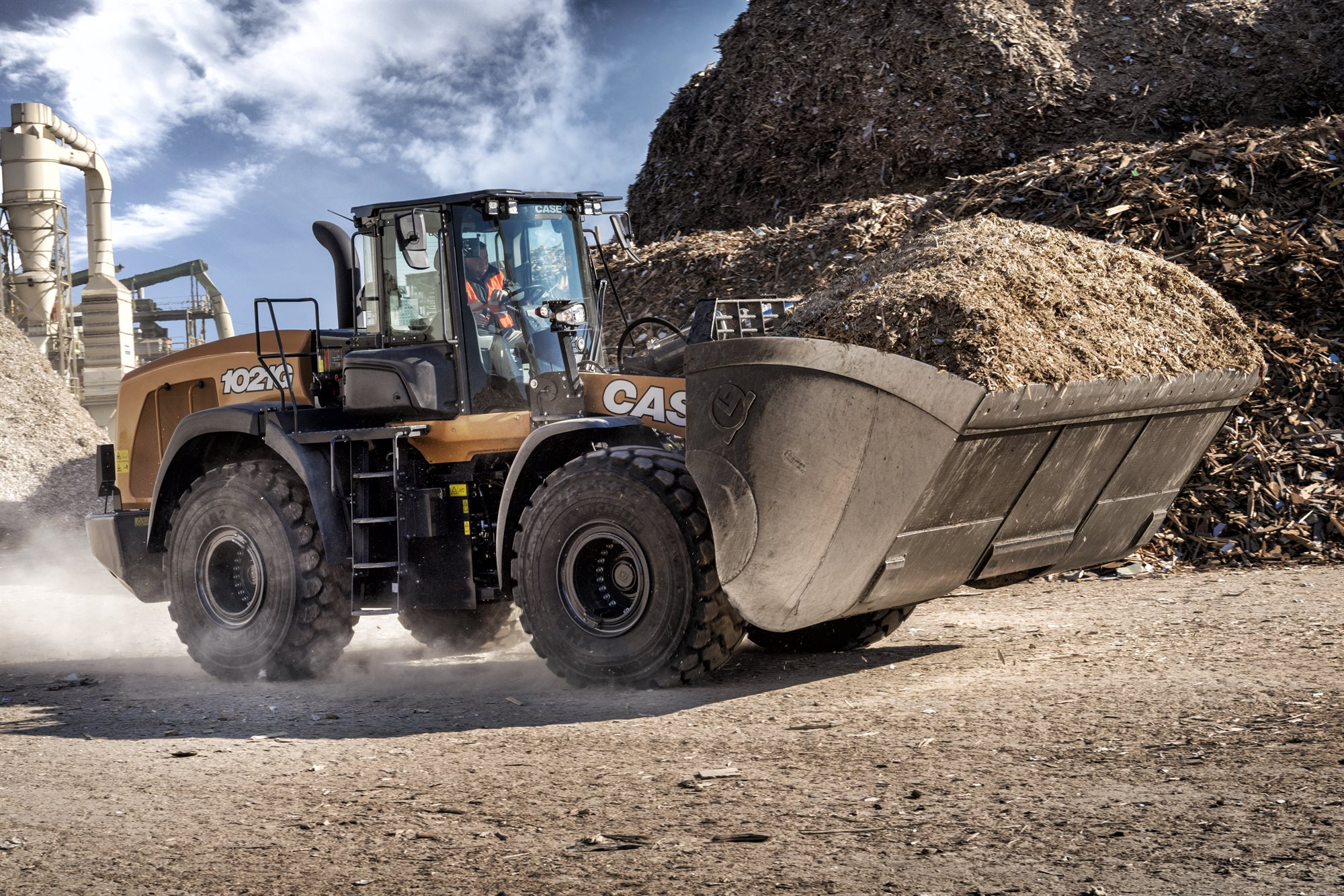
CASE 1021G Wheel Loader.

Case wheel loaders are used in construction and earthmoving, as well as for agriculture such as dairies and feedlots where it is necessary to move large amounts of material.

== Gallery ==
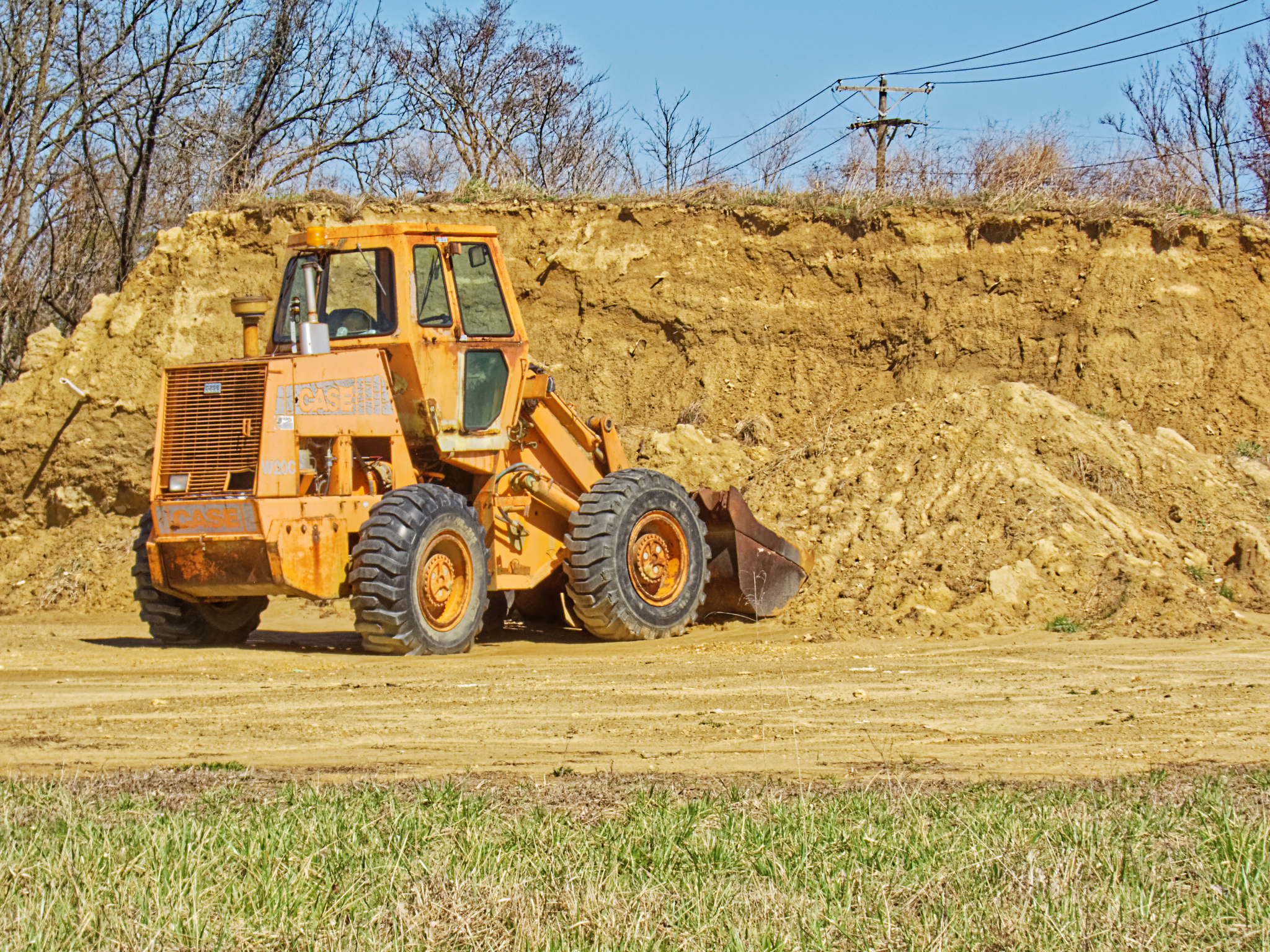
Tuesday_18-March-2025 Case W20C Articulated Loader in Kentucky

== See also ==
- Case IH is CNH Industrial's global provider of agricultural equipment
