= R. P. Home & Harvest =

American retail chain

R.P. Home & Harvest
- Formerly: Big R Stores (1964-2018); Stock + Field (2019-2021)
- Company type: Subsidiary
- Industry: Retail
- Founded: 1964 (62 years ago) in Watseka, Illinois
- Founders: Bill Crabtree; Pat Crabtree
- Defunct: February 2024; 2 years ago
- Fate: Acquired by Runnings; Rebranded
- Headquarters: Watseka, Illinois, United States
- Number of locations: 22 (2021)
- Area served: Illinois; Indiana; Michigan; Ohio; Wisconsin
- Products: Home improvement
- Revenue: ▲$355 million USD (2021)
- Number of employees: 5,000 (2021)
- Parent: R. P. Lumber (2021-2023)
- Website: homeandharvest.com

R.P. Home & Harvest, formerly known as Big R Stores and Stock + Field, was an American retail store specializing in supplies for farming and agriculture, currently being rebranded. It was founded in 1964 in Watseka, Illinois. Although the chain began to undergo liquidation in January 2021, its stores were purchased by R. P. Lumber in March. In April 2023, Runnings, a Minnesota-based retailer acquired the chain with plans to rebrand all the stores by 2024.

== History ==
Big R Stores was founded in 1964 in Watseka, Illinois as a farming supply store by Bill Crabtree and his wife, Pat Crabtree.

Their son-in-law, Jerry Gibbs, bought a majority share of the chain in 1976. In 2018, Gibbs sold the chain to Bill and Pat's son Joda Crabtree and business partner Matt Whebbe, who became the chief executive officer. At the time, the chain consisted of 23 stores in Illinois, Indiana, Wisconsin, and Ohio.

One year later, the chain entered the state of Michigan with stores in Portage and Lansing. While these stores were being opened, Whebbe announced that the chain would officially be renamed to Stock + Field to better reflect the merchandising mix.

In 2021, Stock + Field filed for Chapter 11 bankruptcy and announced that it would be liquidating all of its stores. At the time, 25 Stock + Field stores were in operation.

While the stores were undergoing liquidation, R. P. Lumber of Edwardsville, Illinois announced that it would buy the rights to the stores and continue to operate them under the Stock + Field name.

In September 2021, R. P. Lumber announced it planned to rebrand all of their Stock + Field stores into R. P. Home & Harvest. The stores have subsequently been rebranded along with its website.

In April 2023, it was announced that Runnings, a Minnesota-based retailer, would be buying R.P. Home & Harvest.
