= List of breweries and wineries in North Dakota =

This is a list of breweries in North Dakota.

== Breweries in North Dakota ==
- Dakota Beer
- Dakota Malting and Brewing Company
- Edwinton Brewing
- Fargo Beer Co.
- Fargo Brewing Company
- Laughing Sun Brewing
- Phat Fish Brewing
- Williston Brewing Company

== Wineries in North Dakota ==
- Fluffy Fields Vineyard and Winery
- Pointe of View Winery

== See also ==
- Beer in the United States
- List of breweries in the United States
- List of microbreweries
- North Dakota wine
