= Home of Economy =

American retail store chain

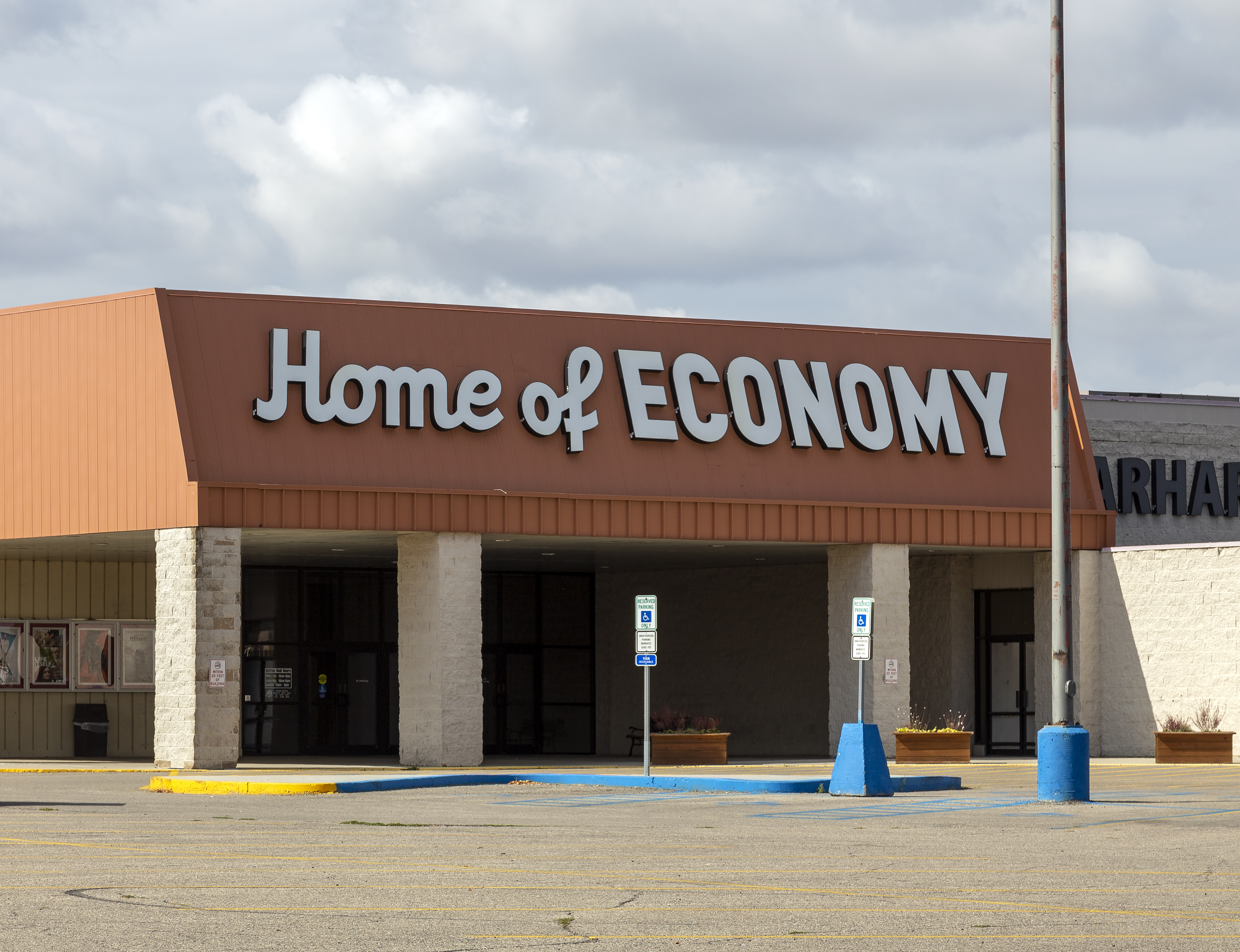
- Home of Economy store in Jamestown, North Dakota
- Type: Private; family business
- Industry: Retail
- Founded: 1939 by M.W. "Bob" Kiesau and Jean Kiesau
- Defunct: 2025
- Fate: Acquired by Runnings
- Headquarters: Grand Forks, North Dakota, USA
- Number of locations: 8
- Products: Amish furniture, clothing, footwear, farm equipment, automotive parts, sporting goods, housewares, lawn & garden supplies, hunting & fishing equipment, toys.
- Website: homeofeconomy.net

Home of Economy was a chain of retail stores with eight locations in North Dakota: Grand Forks, Grafton, Devils Lake, Minot, Williston, Jamestown, Watford City and Rugby. Home of Economy sold a variety of goods: clothing, work wear, home furniture, housewares, automotive goods, tools, farm supplies, hardware, lawn and garden supplies, paint, pet supplies, hunting and fishing equipment, and sporting goods.

== History ==
Founded in 1939 in Thief River Falls, Minnesota by Bob Kiesau and his wife, Jean, Home of Economy was originally an auto parts wholesale business. In February 1940, Bob started a store in Grand Forks, North Dakota, recapping used tires at night and selling them during the day. In the years since, Home of Economy has grown to include stores in other North Dakota cities, including Grafton, Devils Lake, Minot, Williston, Watford City, Jamestown and Rugby.

Home of Economy was considered by many to be the first discount store. Prior to Home of Economy's discount program, free-trade laws required retailers to sell at high, fixed prices, and only fleet operators with five or more machines could receive discounts. In 1950, Bob Kiesau sent his employees to every county seat in the trade area to copy names and addresses of each taxpayer who had listed three or more tractors or combines. He assumed each farmer would have at least one car and one truck that would not be listed on the tax report. From this list, a fleet identification card was mailed to every farmer, enabling them to buy at fleet discounts.

On December 3, 1987, fire destroyed the store in Grand Forks. The store was back in operation in three separate temporary locations less than a week after the fire began.

Their company's motto was (variously):

- "Be wise, Economize"
- "The friendly store where your dollar buys more."

On May 30, 2024, it was announced that Home of Economy (a Midstates Distributing Cooperative founder) had been sold to Runnings, another member of Midstates, and that Runnings would expand to 90 stores through its acquisition of Home of Economy. The closure of the acquisition was announced on September 4, 2024. The eight Home of Economy stores continued to operate under that name until their conversion to Runnings was completed in early 2025.

== Locations ==
- Grand Forks 1508 North Washington Street
- Grafton 868 West 12th Street
- Devils Lake 1205 Highway 2 East
- Minot 107 20th Avenue Southwest
- Williston 2102 2nd Avenue West
- Watford City 113 6th Street SE Ste 5200
- Jamestown Buffalo Mall, 2400 8th Ave SW
- Rugby 225 US Highway 2
