= Runnings =

American retail chain

Runnings, Inc.
- Type: Private
- Industry: Retail
- Founded: 1947; 79 years ago Marshall, Minnesota, U.S.
- Founders: Norman “Red” Running
- Headquarters: Marshall, Minnesota, United States
- Number of locations: 90 (As of April 2024)
- Area served: Illinois, Iowa, Indiana, Wisconsin, Ohio, Minnesota, New York, Connecticut, New Hampshire, Montana, North Dakota, and South Dakota
- Key people: Dennis and Adele Reed
- Products: Hunting and fishing equipment, clothing and footwear, toys, food, hardware, lawn and garden supplies, paint, pet supplies, sporting goods, tools, and farm supplies.
- Number of employees: 2,700+
- Subsidiaries: Campbell Supply Co.
- Website: www.runnings.com

Runnings is an American retail chain that primarily sells farming and ranching equipment. They also sell items such as clothing, sporting goods, pet supplies, household supplies, and automotive goods.

== History ==
The first Runnings store opened on December 5, 1947 by founder Norman “Red” Running in downtown Marshall, Minnesota. The company was bought by Dennis and Adele Reed in 1988.

Runnings acquired R. P. Home & Harvest in April of 2023.

Runnings acquired North Dakota-based Home of Economy in May of 2024, gaining eight stores in the process.
