= North Dakota wine =

Wine made from grapes grown in North Dakota, USA

North Dakota
- Wine region
- Official name: State of North Dakota
- Type: U.S. state
- Year established: 1889
- Years of wine industry: 2002-present
- Country: United States
- Total area: 70,762 square miles (183,273 km^{2})
- No. of wineries: 2

North Dakota wine refers to wine made from grapes grown in the U.S. state of North Dakota. North Dakota was the last state in the United States since Prohibition to license a commercial winery. The first bonded commercial winery in North Dakota, Pointe of View Winery, was established on April 17, 2002. Pointe of View Winery has since been joined by a second winery, Dakota Hills Winery, but both wineries focus on wine made from fruits other than grapes.

== See also ==
- American wine
- List of breweries and wineries in North Dakota
