= Titan Machinery =

US agricultural machinery dealer

Titan Machinery, Inc.

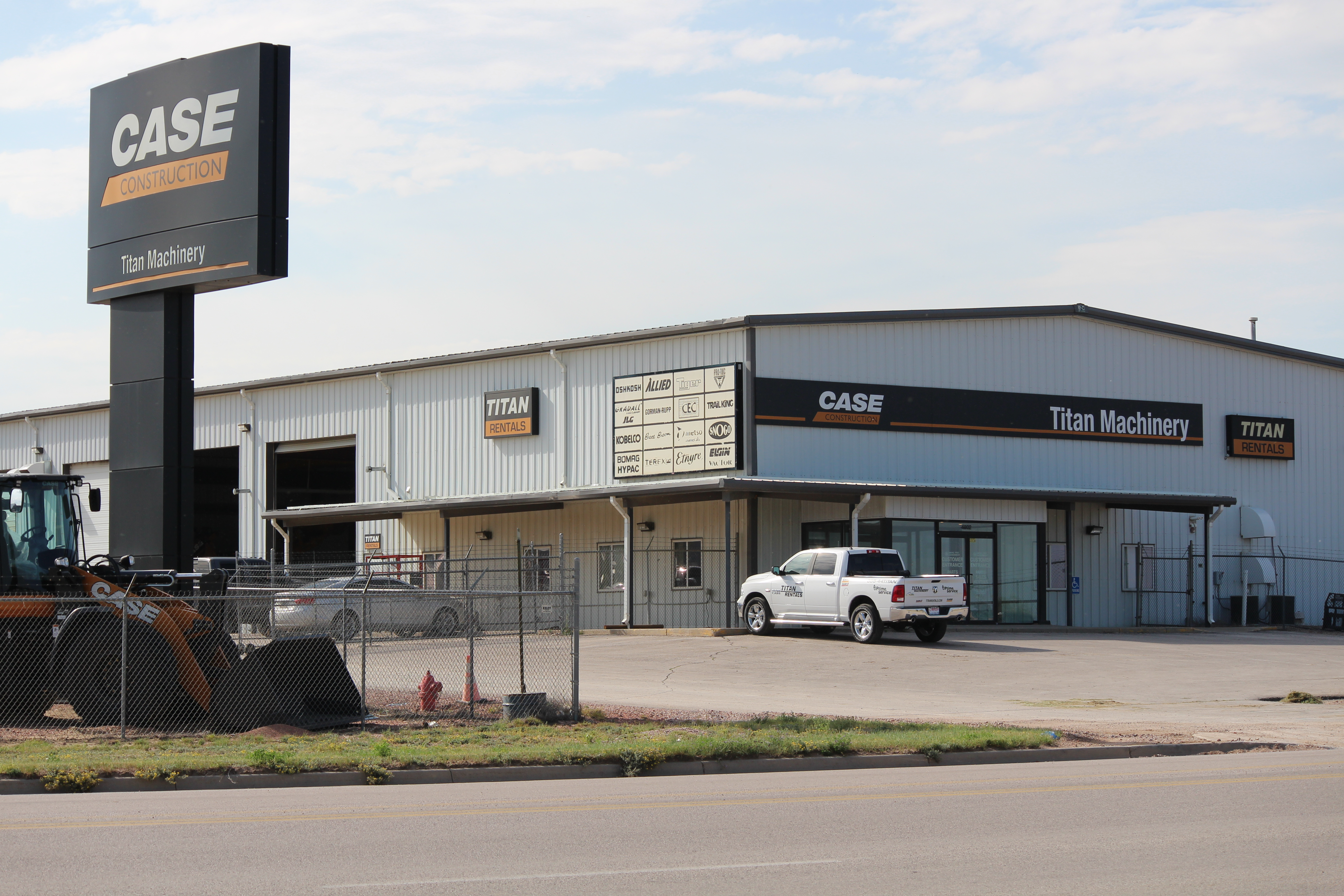
- Former Titan Machinery dealership in Gillette, Wyoming
- Type: Public
- Traded as: Nasdaq: TITN; Russell 2000 Component
- ISIN: US88830R1014
- Industry: Agricultural equipment Construction equipment
- Founded: 1980; 46 years ago, in Wahpeton, North Dakota
- Headquarters: West Fargo, North Dakota, United States
- Number of locations: 151 dealerships (2024)
- Area served: Midwestern United States; Australia; Austria; Bulgaria; Germany; Romania; Ukraine
- Key people: Bryan Knutson (CEO); Robert Larsen (CFO); David Meyer (chairman of the board)
- Products: Case IH, New Holland Agriculture, Case CE, New Holland Construction
- Services: New and Used Equipment Sales; Equipment Repair and Maintenance; Equipment rental; Financial services
- Revenue: US$2.209 billion (2023)
- Operating income: US$138.323 million (2023)
- Net income: US$439.839 million (2023)
- Total assets: 1.188 billion (2023)
- Number of employees: over 2,700 (2023)
- Subsidiaries: Heartland Agriculture, LLC; Heartland Solutions, LLC; Heartland Leveraged Lender, LLC; J.J. O'Connor & Sons Pty. Ltd.; Titan Machinery Austria GmbH; Titan Machinery Holdings Australia Pty. Ltd.; Titan Machinery Bulgaria EAD; Titan Machinery Deutschland GmbH; Titan Machinery Romania SRL; Titan Machinery Ukraine, LLC
- Website: titanmachinery.com

Titan Machinery, Inc. is one of the largest dealers of agricultural and construction equipment and claims to be the largest dealer for the CNH Industrial brands (Case IH, Case CE, New Holland Agriculture, New Holland Construction) in the world. It is based in West Fargo, North Dakota and has locations throughout the Midwestern United States, Australia, Austria, Bulgaria, Germany, Romania and Ukraine. The company is publicly traded on NASDAQ using the symbol TITN. As of 2023, the company reported a total revenue of US$2.209 billion.

== History ==
In 1975, after graduating from college, David Meyer joined the Case Corporation as a product specialist for 4WD tractors. In November of the same year, he began working for the Case dealership Meyer-Jones Farm Store in Wahpeton, North Dakota. In 1976, Meyer and his business partner Darrell Larson became minority shareholders in the company. In September 1977 Larson and Meyer opened a second dealership in Lisbon, North Dakota.

Titan Machinery was founded in 1980 when Meyer and Larson bought out the majority shareholders of Meyer-Jones Farm Store. Darrell Larson left Titan at the end of the 1980s. In the early 1990s, the company began its expansion with acquisitions in La Moure, North Dakota, and Lidgerwood, North Dakota. By 2003, Titan had grown to 13 dealerships after a merger with C.I. Farm Power. Peter and Tony Christianson, owners of C.I. Farm Power, joined Titan Machinery's management. In December 2007 Titan Machinery was taken public with 34 dealerships and US$300 million in revenue at the time.

In late 2011 Titan Machinery expanded into Eastern Europe with its purchase of two Case IH dealerships in Bucharest and Timișoara, Romania. In February 2012 the company acquired seven dealerships in Bulgaria and one dealership in Serbia in December 2012.

After receiving approval from CNH Industrial, Titan Machinery opened its first dealership in Vinnitsa, Ukraine on February 18, 2014.

Following declining revenue in its agricultural equipment business, Titan closed 3 stores in South Dakota and Wyoming in March 2015 and reduced its workforce by 14% through layoffs, store closings and open positions not being filled.

On April 30, 2018, Titan Machinery announced its acquisition of Agram Landtechnikvertrieb GmbH and its 5 Case IH dealerships in Mecklenburg-Vorpommern, Brandenburg and Saxony in Germany.

In August 2023 the company announced its strategic acquisition of J.J. O’Connor & Sons Pty. Ltd. (“O’Connors”), the largest Case IH dealership group in Australia, for US$63 million. O'Connors has 15 dealership locations in the southeastern states Victoria, New South Wales, and South Australia.

In January 2024 Titan Machinery acquired the assets of Scott Supply Co., a Case IH and New Holland dealership in Mitchell, South Dakota.

In October 2023 Titan informed its shareholders, that the long-time CEO David Meyer would take on the role of executive chairman and be succeeded as CEO by Bryan Knutson. The change came into effect February 1, 2024.

On November 6, 2025, it was announced that Titan Machinery would cease operations at all branches in Germany, effective January 1, 2026, and leave the German market. The Burkau site and the sales areas of Saxony and southern Brandenburg were taken over by Agrartechnik Vertrieb Sachsen GmbH. The Mecklenburg-Vorpommern sales territory was taken over by the Wüstenberg Group from Schleswig-Holstein without employees or branches.

== Dealership locations ==
As of January 31, 2024, Titan Machinery operated a total of 151 dealerships worldwide. 94 of these dealerships were in the United States, 16 dealerships in Australia, 41 locations in Europe and a European headquarters at the Vienna airport.

Country	State	Number of locations
Australia	New South Wales	5
	South Australia	1
	Victoria	10
Austria	Niederösterreich	1
Bulgaria		8
Germany	Brandenburg	1
	Mecklenburg-Vorpommern	5
	Saxony	3
Romania		14
Ukraine		10
United States	Colorado	3
	Idaho	6
	Iowa	15
	Kansas	1
	Minnesota	18
	Missouri	1
	Montana	1
	Nebraska	16
	North Dakota	16
	Washington	1
	Wisconsin	2
	Wyoming	1
	South Dakota	13
