= Pointe of View Winery =

Winery in Burlington, North Dakota

- Location: Burlington, North Dakota, United States
- Appellation: North Dakota
- Founded: 2002
- First vintage: 2002
- Key people: Jeff & Diana Peterson, Ken & Cindy Eggleston
- Website: http://www.povwinery.com

The Pointe of View Winery is a winery located in the north-central part of North Dakota, United States half a mile south of Burlington, in the Minot area. Licensed in April 2002, it was the first federally licensed and bonded winery in North Dakota, the last state of the United States to have a federally licensed winery, marking the first time when there was at least one federally licensed and bonded winery in all fifty states.

== History ==
The owners of the winery (the Petersons and the Egglestons) experimented for many years making wines for their own consumption.

Their rhubarb wine (no vintage) has received a bronze medal in the 2006 American Wine Society Commercial Wine Competition.

== Wines ==
Although North Dakota is often thought of as a climate that can not produce grapes, there are a number of vineyards in the state. In addition to grapes, the winery also uses a wide variety of other fruits for their wines which include Grape, Rhubarb, Cherry, Apple, Elderberry, Blackcurrant, Plum, Chokecherry, Strawberry, and Juneberry.

== See also ==
- List of breweries and wineries in North Dakota
