= Packet Digital =

Packet Digital LLC
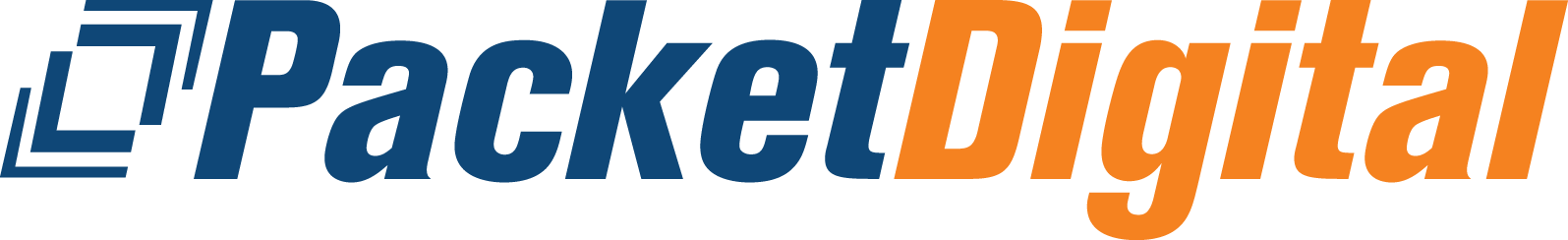
- Industry: Semiconductors; Unmanned aerial systems
- Founded: 2003
- Headquarters: Fargo, North Dakota, U.S.
- Key people: Terri Zimmerman, CEO; Andrew Paulsen, Chief Technology Officer
- Website: packetdigital.com

Packet Digital LLC Packet Digital is an engineering and manufacturing company focused on UAS battery development and production. Founded in 2003, Packet Digital’s team has develops batteries and power systems.

== Unmanned Aircraft Systems (UAS) ==
Packet Digital designs circuitry for solar-powered UAS to more efficiently use electrical output from solar panels on the aircraft wings and fuselage to power avionics and charge batteries, to increase flight times. With the opening of its manufacturing facility in December 2023, Packet Digital is now assembling all of its printed circuit boards in-house with the use of a surface-mount technology line.

Packet Digital is designing power electronics to be used conjointly with advanced photovoltaics being developed by the United States Naval Research Laboratory, Washington, D.C., with the aim of producing solar-powered UAS with unlimited flight time. The circuitry will use power tracking algorithms to accommodate movements of the unmanned aerial vehicle (UAV) or clouds that could change how much sunlight is available to the solar cells.

Packet Digital announced in June 2015 that it would create Botlink LLC as a joint venture with drone app developer Aerobotic Innovations LLC. Botlink will develop and market a hardware-software platform combining Packet Digital's power management circuits for improved drone endurance and Aerobotic Innovation's Internet cloud-based operations platform for safety, communications, data processing and control of a drone from a drag-and-drop app on a tablet or smartphone—a feature known as "Drag. Drop. Drone."

In 2021, Packet Digital and the US Naval Research Laboratory (NRL) announced the successful first test flight of their jointly developed long-endurance UAS. The fixed-wing, hybrid UAS utilized solar panels installed on the wings, autonomous soaring algorithms, and hydrogen fuel cell technology to create a new class of small UAS with the ability to stay in flight for over two days. The fixed-wing drone successfully completed the first phase of operational testing at the Aberdeen Proving Ground in Maryland in late November.

Additionally in 2021, Packet Digital was awarded a supplier agreement with Lockheed Martin to supply high energy density, lithium batteries for Lockheed Martin's cutting-edge Indago 4 drone. Packet Digital's Indago 4 battery has significantly better performance and functionality than earlier Indago batteries. The battery management system enhances the safety and longevity of the battery, reducing cost of ownership. Packet Digital has also developed a multi-pack field charger that can be operated on either AC or DC.

In 2022, Packet Digital was awarded an $8.5 million contract to develop UAS smart batteries, chargers and power systems for the U.S. Navy. The company is responsible for designing and manufacturing high-performance UAS battery systems for the next generation of Navy maritime logistics UAS. Additionally, the battery design will enable the Navy UAS fleet to share a standard set of features and construction techniques so that battery variants can be produced quickly with minimal resource requirements.

== Space power systems ==
In 2021, Packet Digital was awarded a US$7,999,913 contract by the Air Force Research Laboratory to develop highly-efficient and reliable space power components for future U.S. space missions. Work began in July 2021, and is expected to be completed in 2024. Packet Digital's development focuses on replacing current spacecraft power system hardware, which is reaching its technological limit in regards to power density and efficiency. Power system hardware size and weight can be dramatically reduced by implementing advanced technologies.

== Leadership ==
As of 2025 Packet Digital was led by Terri Zimmerman (CEO), who was named CEO in 2013. CTO Andrew Paulsen joined Packet Digital in 2005.

== Accolades ==
Packet Digital was named the Electronics and Overall Innovation Challenge Winner at Aviation Week 2012 in Washington, D.C. Gartner named Packet Digital in its 2014 Cool Vendors in Semiconductors report. Inc. listed the company number 468 among its 500 Fastest Growing Companies in 2008.
