= McKenzie Electric Cooperative =

Electric cooperative in North Dakota and Montana

- Type: Utility cooperative
- Industry: Electric power industry
- Founded: 1945
- Headquarters: 3817 23rd Ave NE, Watford City, North Dakota, United States
- Area served: North Dakota and Montana
- Key people: Matt Hanson, CEO
- Products: Electricity
- Number of employees: 77 (2024)
- Website: mckenzieelectric.com

McKenzie Electric Cooperative, Inc. (MEC) is a utility cooperative based in Watford City, North Dakota. It is a rural, not-for-profit electric cooperative governed by a nine-member board of directors elected by its members. It services portions of McKenzie, Dunn, Billings, Golden Valley and Mercer Counties in North Dakota and Richland and Wibaux Counties in Montana. The cooperative serves nearly 15,000 electric meters across the seven counties. MEC is a member of the North Dakota Association of Rural Electric Cooperatives.

== History ==
McKenzie Electric Cooperative was incorporated in 1945 as part of the rural electrification effort in North Dakota. Its first electric lines were energized in 1947. During the fiscal years 1947 and 1948, the cooperative energized the initial sections of its electric system as one of ten new REA-financed power systems in North Dakota.

Electricity first reached rural McKenzie County in 1947. According to the cooperative's then general manager and CEO John Skurupey, some of the original lines remained in service more than six decades later.

McKenzie Electric Cooperative's transmission and distribution lines serve communities, rural residences, and commercial establishments in the project area.

== Operations ==
As of June 2024, McKenzie Electric Cooperative had 4,769 members and 13,456 meters. Its system included 73 substations and 4,042 miles of distribution lines, and the cooperative had 63 employees.

As of May 2025, McKenzie Electric Cooperative had 4,866 members and 13,780 meters, 76 substations, 4,084 miles of distribution lines and 444 miles of transmission lines. The cooperative reported system availability of 99.95 percent. Commercial and industrial customers accounted for 97 percent of electricity sales. At the time, average system load was reported at 750–800 MW, with a peak of approximately 890 MW.

McKenzie Electric Cooperative is a Class C distribution cooperative. It receives most of its power through Basin Electric Power Cooperative and a small amount of hydropower through the Western Area Power Administration. Its service area is within the Southwest Power Pool (SPP) territory and adjacent to the Midcontinent Independent System Operator (MISO) territory.
