= Vanity (clothing) =

American specialty chain of fashion retailers

Vanity, Inc.
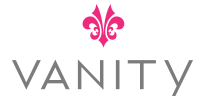

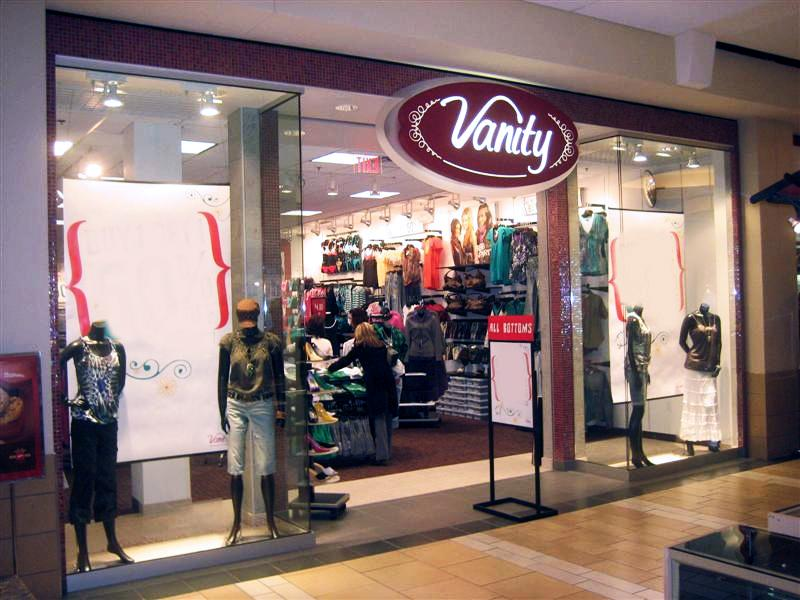
- Type: Private
- Industry: Apparel, Retail
- Founded: 1957, incorporated in 1966
- Defunct: 2017
- Fate: bankruptcy
- Headquarters: Fargo, North Dakota
- Area served: United States
- Key people: Bottrell Families
- Products: Clothing, Accessories
- Number of employees: 2,000
- Website: Archived official website at the Wayback Machine (archive index)

Vanity, also known as Vanity Shops, was an American specialty chain of fashion retailers that sold apparel and accessories targeted to fashion-conscious young women, online and in stores. The company was headquartered in Fargo, North Dakota. The fashion retailer's clothing items ranged in size from zero to 17, with pants inseam lengths of up to 37 inches (940 mm). Vanity filed for bankruptcy and closed its stores in 2017.

== History ==
Emery and Ann Jahnke purchased the Vanity name in 1957 from a dress shop where Ann worked in Dickinson, North Dakota. Vanity was incorporated in 1966, opening a 900 square feet (84 m^{2}) store in Dickinson. In 1969, the first Vanity junior fashion store opened in Fargo, North Dakota.

In 1960, the store moved to a 2,000-square-foot (190 m^{2}) location and opened a children's clothing store in the original location. In 1964, the Jahnkes opened a 3,000-square-foot (280 m^{2}) store in Grand Forks, North Dakota, with one-third of the floor space dedicated to junior women's merchandise. This store proved to be so successful that the Jahnkes sold their Dickinson locations and opened Vanity 2 in Grand Forks with 4,000 square feet (370 m^{2}) of space. It was the only junior women's store in the state at the time.

In 1971, Vanity 3 opened in downtown Fargo. The store was part of a Concept208, which consisted of a music store, shoe store, candle and poster store, young men's store, hot dog stand and Vanity.

Eight new locations were established in 1972, including Vanity 4 in Bismarck, Vanity 5 in West Acres Mall of Fargo, and six stores in Colorado, marking the first time the company had expanded beyond the borders of North Dakota. Vanity headquarters moved to Fargo in 1974.

By 2013, the Vanity chain had grown to 170 stores in 26 states; the corporate headquarters and distribution center remain in Fargo, North Dakota, along with the company's website.

In early 2017, Vanity announced that it had filed for bankruptcy and was closing its 140 outlets in 27 states.

=== Vanity.com ===

Launched July 2008, Vanity also served customers through an online presence, Vanity, LLC. Services included merchandising, marketing and distribution. Corporate office and distribution center were located in Fargo.

Online shoppers had access to behind-the-scenes videos, guides and lookbooks that educated them about frequently changing trends. The site claimed to provide a user-friendly experience with options to shop by featured outfits, clothing categories, best sellers, inseams and more.

In 2013, Vanity changed its domain name from "eVanity.com" to "Vanity.com".

=== Logo evolution ===
The Vanity logo has been updated through the years. With the advent of its website, the fashion retailer introduced a Vanity logo for all e-commerce communications.

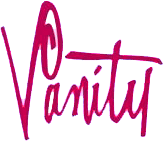
Logo #1

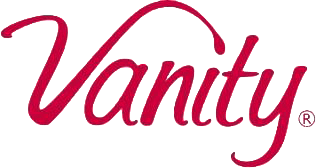
Logo #2

Logo #3

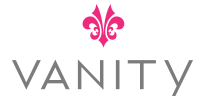
Logo #4

Fashion that fits logo

In 2006, Vanity trademarked the tagline "Fashion that Fits", supposedly referring to how the Vanity brand reflects its customers' body types and lifestyles, as well as its affordable pricing.

== Specialty fashion ==
In 2009, Vanity offered new fashions that consisted of products made from recycled materials with sustainable resources, such as bamboo, as well as organic materials.

In 2010, Vanity launched a new line of career wear trademarked "Style that Works". The company also expanded its Vanity Premium Collection to include fashion tops and jewelry.

Vanity was noted for its broad range of sizes offered, including a plus-size line, that was launched in 2013, before being absorbed into the main store.

== Philanthropy ==
Denim drive
In fall 2009, Vanity teamed up with Cotton Incorporated to launch a nationwide denim drive aimed at helping rebuild communities adversely affected by hurricanes, tornadoes and other natural disasters. Vanity retail locations solicited and collected donations of denim, which was reprocessed to cotton fiber, treated with fire retardant, and converted into insulation. The campaign ultimately provided insulation for over 180 homes in the Gulf Coast region of the United States.

Food drive
In September 2010, Vanity and pop band OneRepublic joined forces to help Feeding America through an in-store food drive and CD sales. The "Share the Secret About Hunger" campaign aimed to raise awareness of food insecurity experienced by Americans and provide hunger relief in communities across the country.

== Bankruptcy ==
On March 1, 2017, Vanity Shops of Grand Forks, Inc. declared bankruptcy and closed its 137 stores.
