= Trade Arabia =

Online News Website

- Industry: Online news media Business news Industry news Online publishing
- Founded: Manama, Bahrain (1999)
- Headquarters: Exhibition Avenue, Manama; Bahrain
- Key people: Ronnie Middleton, Managing Director
- Products: Events Calendar; News and Features; Premium Content
- Revenue: n/a
- Website: www.tradearabia.com

Trade Arabia is a Bahrain-based online business news and information portal covering various trade and industry sectors in the Persian Gulf region, Middle East and the Levant.
