= Pracs Institute =

US pharmaceutical company

PRACS Institute, Ltd., established in 1983, is a company that tests new or developing types of medicine. Its CEO is Dr. James Carlson, a former pharmacy professor at North Dakota State University. The company currently has locations in East Grand Forks, Minnesota, and Fargo, North Dakota.

In February 2006, PRACS announced it would become a wholly owned subsidiary of Contract Research Solutions (CRS). CRS was formed as a holding company by investors, including Carlson and two others: KRG Capital Partners, and the Weinberg & Bell Group. In August 2006, CRS announced the acquisition of Gateway Medical Research, a St. Louis–based competitor of PRACS. CRS also announced in late 2006 that it had acquired Ba Research International of Houston, Texas. The three companies (PRACS, Gateway and Ba) will combine their operations under the name Cetero Research.

On October 5, 2006, Dr. Carlson announced a $1 million pledge to the city of Fargo towards the construction of a new branch of the city's public library. The project (with a total cost of $2.5 million) will be named the "Dr. James D. Carlson Library".

On March 20, 2013, PRACS laid off its employees in Fargo, St. Louis, and Toronto after filing for chapter 7 bankruptcy.
