= Watford City, North Dakota =

- City
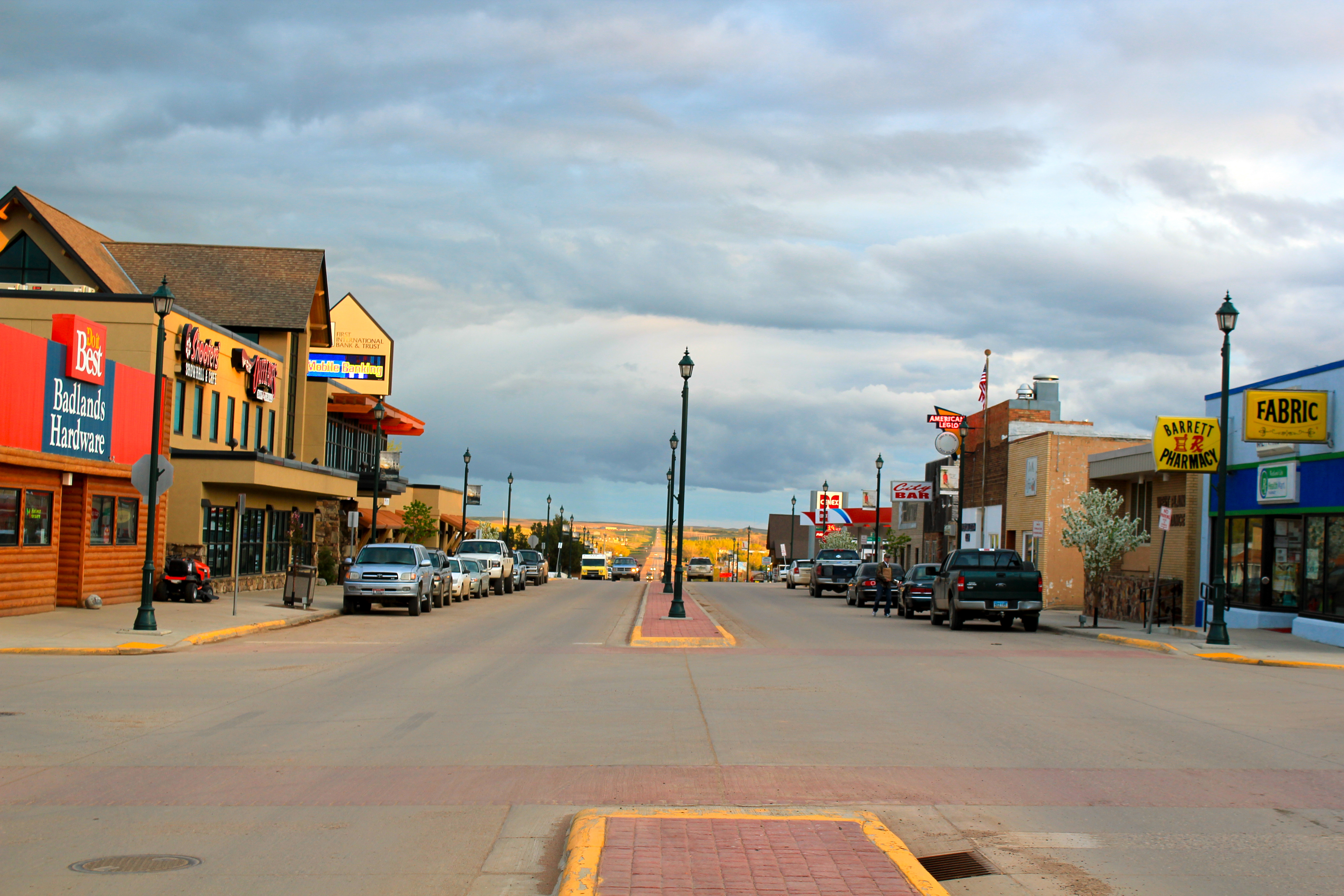
- Main Street in Watford City

- Logo
- Motto: Come be our guest
- Interactive map of Watford City, North Dakota
- Location within North Dakota
- Coordinates: 47.8015°N 103.2667°W
- Country: United States
- State: North Dakota
- County: McKenzie
- Founded: 1914
- Incorporated: June 1915

Government
  - Mayor: Phil Riely
  - City council: Bethany Devlin; Carissa Suter; Chelsea Bulzomi; Lance Renville; Shilo Chavez; Steve Sanford

Area
  - City: 8.994 sq mi (23.294 km^{2})
  - Land: 8.915 sq mi (23.090 km^{2})
  - Water: 0.079 sq mi (0.204 km^{2}) 0.88%
- Elevation: 2,054 ft (626 m)

Population (2020)
  - City: 6,207
  - Estimate (2025): 6,378
  - Density: 696.2/sq mi (268.8/km^{2})
  - Urban: 6,687
  - Metro: 15,192
- Time zone: UTC–6 (Central (CST))
  - Summer (DST): UTC–5 (CDT)
- ZIP Code: 58854
- Area code: 701
- FIPS code: 38-83860
- GNIS feature ID: 1036317
- Highways: US 85, ND 23, ND 23 Alt.
- Website: cityofwatfordcity.gov

Watford City (Hidatsa: abaʔaruʔush), founded in 1914, is a city in and the county seat of McKenzie County, North Dakota, United States. The population was 6,207 as of the 2020 census, and was estimated to be 6,378 in 2025, making it the 14th-most-populous city in North Dakota. Because Watford City is part of the Bakken field, the North Dakota oil boom has significantly increased population and construction since the 2010 census.

The main offices of First International Bank and the headquarters of McKenzie Electric Cooperative are in Watford City. The local newspaper is the McKenzie County Farmer.

== History ==
In 1913, a few prospective businessmen located on the townsite of the future Watford City in anticipation of the arrival of the first Great Northern Railroad train from Fairview, Montana. The Northern Land and Townsite Company, a division of the Great Northern, platted the town and sold lots in June 1914. Building began immediately, and many businesses and homes were moved from Schafer, which eventually became a ghost town. Watford, incorporated in June 1915, was named by Vaughan G. Morris (1879–1940) for his hometown of Watford, Ontario. A year later, the town added "City" to its name to differentiate itself from Wolford in Pierce County.

The Great Northern planned to extend its line to New Rockford and in 1914 began building the Madson Grade, one of the longest dirt-filled railroad grades in the country about a mile west of town. Two years later, the grade was 90 feet high and nearly a mile long, but the project was abandoned shortly before the United States entered World War I.

Village officers were elected in 1915, and they concerned themselves with such tasks as impounding stray horses and cattle, prohibiting swine and chickens from town, locating hitching posts, and removing hay stacks from Main Street. The town had a band and baseball team from its founding. A school and several churches were also constructed almost immediately. During the Great Depression, a water and sanitary system was completed using labor mostly paid by the Public Works Administration.

In 1940, Watford City won a hotly contested campaign for county seat, defeating Alexander and Arnegard and taking the prize from Schafer. At first, difficulty finding suitable office space arose, and a recently constructed hospital was sold to the county for use as a courthouse. A new hospital was dedicated in 1952. Watford City Air Force Station (formally Alexander) was opened nearby in 1979. Burlington Northern Railroad abandoned the branch line from Fairview to Watford City in 1992.

== Geography ==
Watford City is in western North Dakota, in central McKenzie County. U.S. Route 85 and North Dakota Highway 200, running concurrently, pass south and west of the city on a bypass. Williston is 46 miles (74 km) to the northwest, and Interstate 94 is at Belfield via US 85. North Dakota Highway 23 has its western terminus in Watford City and leads east 49 miles (79 km) to New Town.

According to the United States Census Bureau, the city has a total area of 8.994 square miles (23.29 km^{2}), of which 8.915 square miles (23.09 km^{2}) are land and 0.079 sq mi (0.20 km^{2}) (0.88%) is covered by water. Cherry Creek, a tributary of the Little Missouri River, flows through the east side of the city.

== Climate ==
This climatic region is typified by large seasonal temperature differences, with warm to hot (and often humid) summers and cold (sometimes severely cold) winters. According to the Köppen climate classification, Watford City has a humid continental climate, Dfb on climate maps. The wettest time of year is late spring to early summer; winter is the driest season. Temperature variation between seasons is significant.

Climate data for Watford City, North Dakota (1991–2020 normals, extremes 1912–present)
Month	Jan	Feb	Mar	Apr	May	Jun	Jul	Aug	Sep	Oct	Nov	Dec	Year
Record high °F (°C)	60 (16)	64 (18)	81 (27)	92 (33)	103 (39)	110 (43)	112 (44)	111 (44)	103 (39)	96 (36)	77 (25)	66 (19)	112 (44)
Mean daily maximum °F (°C)	21.6 (−5.8)	26.2 (−3.2)	38.8 (3.8)	53.1 (11.7)	64.8 (18.2)	74.1 (23.4)	82.2 (27.9)	81.6 (27.6)	71.1 (21.7)	54.7 (12.6)	38.0 (3.3)	26.2 (−3.2)	52.7 (11.5)
Daily mean °F (°C)	13.4 (−10.3)	17.2 (−8.2)	28.8 (−1.8)	41.8 (5.4)	53.5 (11.9)	63.5 (17.5)	70.0 (21.1)	68.5 (20.3)	58.0 (14.4)	43.7 (6.5)	29.0 (−1.7)	18.0 (−7.8)	42.1 (5.6)
Mean daily minimum °F (°C)	5.1 (−14.9)	8.1 (−13.3)	18.8 (−7.3)	30.5 (−0.8)	42.1 (5.6)	52.9 (11.6)	57.9 (14.4)	55.4 (13.0)	44.9 (7.2)	32.6 (0.3)	20.0 (−6.7)	9.9 (−12.3)	31.5 (−0.3)
Record low °F (°C)	−45 (−43)	−44 (−42)	−30 (−34)	−13 (−25)	12 (−11)	19 (−7)	32 (0)	29 (−2)	10 (−12)	−7 (−22)	−22 (−30)	−36 (−38)	−45 (−43)
Average precipitation inches (mm)	0.50 (13)	0.41 (10)	0.63 (16)	0.96 (24)	2.38 (60)	3.44 (87)	2.63 (67)	1.35 (34)	1.16 (29)	1.04 (26)	0.60 (15)	0.55 (14)	15.65 (398)
Average snowfall inches (cm)	9.5 (24)	8.2 (21)	7.3 (19)	4.2 (11)	1.4 (3.6)	0.0 (0.0)	0.0 (0.0)	0.0 (0.0)	0.0 (0.0)	2.9 (7.4)	6.8 (17)	10.1 (26)	50.4 (128)
Average precipitation days (≥ 0.01 in)	6.9	5.7	6.5	7.6	11.1	12.6	9.4	8.6	7.3	6.6	6.1	6.9	95.3
Average snowy days (≥ 0.1 in)	8.1	6.3	5.0	2.5	0.7	0.0	0.0	0.0	0.0	1.5	4.6	7.5	36.2
Source: NOAA

== Demographics ==
Historical population
Census	Pop.	Note	%±
1920	260		—
1930	769		195.8%
1940	1,023		33.0%
1950	1,371		34.0%
1960	1,865		36.0%
1970	1,768		−5.2%
1980	2,119		19.9%
1990	1,784		−15.8%
2000	1,435		−19.6%
2010	1,744		21.5%
2020	6,207		255.9%
2025 (est.)	6,378		2.8%
U.S. Decennial Census; 2020 Census

According to realtor website Zillow, the average price of a home as of July 31, 2026, in Watford City was $386,046.

As of the 2024 American Community Survey, there were 2,629 estimated households in Watford City with an average of 2.26 persons per household. The city has a median household income of $102,260. Approximately 7.8% of the city's population lives at or below the poverty line. Watford City has an estimated 79.7% employment rate, with 18.9% of the population holding a bachelor's degree or higher and 86.8% holding a high school diploma. There were 3,491 housing units at an average density of 391.59 per square mile (151.2/km^{2}).

The top five reported languages (people were allowed to report up to two languages, thus the figures will generally add to more than 100%) were English (88.3%), Spanish (10.7%), Indo-European (0.0%), Asian and Pacific Islander (0.9%), and Other (0.1%).

The median age in the city was 28.8 years.

Watford City, North Dakota – racial and ethnic composition Note: the US Census treats Hispanic/Latino as an ethnic category. This table excludes Latinos from the racial categories and assigns them to a separate category. Hispanics/Latinos may be of any race.
Race / ethnicity (NH = non-Hispanic)	Pop. 1980	Pop. 1990	Pop. 2000	Pop. 2010	Pop. 2020
White alone (NH)	2,075 (97.92%)	1,736 (97.31%)	1,351 (94.15%)	1,609 (92.26%)	4,311 (69.45%)
Black or African American alone (NH)	1 (0.05%)	1 (0.06%)	3 (0.21%)	2 (0.11%)	145 (2.34%)
Native American or Alaska Native alone (NH)	—	41 (2.30%)	51 (3.55%)	57 (3.27%)	117 (1.88%)
Asian alone (NH)	—	1 (0.06%)	0 (0.00%)	13 (0.75%)	136 (2.19%)
Pacific Islander alone (NH)	—	—	0 (0.00%)	2 (0.11%)	5 (0.08%)
Other race alone (NH)	37 (1.75%)	0 (0.00%)	0 (0.00%)	0 (0.00%)	38 (0.61%)
Mixed race or multiracial (NH)	—	—	14 (0.98%)	28 (1.61%)	294 (4.74%)
Hispanic or Latino (any race)	6 (0.28%)	5 (0.28%)	16 (1.11%)	33 (1.89%)	1,161 (18.70%)
Total	2,119 (100.00%)	1,784 (100.00%)	1,435 (100.00%)	1,744 (100.00%)	6,207 (100.00%)

=== 2020 census ===
As of the 2020 census, there were 6,207 people, 2,449 households, 1,390 families residing in the city. The population density was 691.43 inhabitants per square mile (266.96/km^{2}). There were 3,512 housing units at an average density of 391.22 per square mile (151.05/km^{2}). The racial makeup of the city was 73.72% White, 2.40% African American, 2.00% Native American, 2.19% Asian, 0.08% Pacific Islander, 9.62% from some other races and 9.99% from two or more races. Hispanic or Latino people of any race were 18.70% of the population.

=== 2010 census ===
As of the 2010 census, there were 1,744 people, 733 households, and 445 families residing in the city. The population density was 1,243.05 inhabitants per square mile (479.94/km^{2}). There were 873 housing units at an average density of 622.24 per square mile (240.25/km^{2}). The racial makeup of the city was 93.64% White, 0.11% African American, 3.44% Native American, 0.75% Asian, 0.11% Pacific Islander, 0.34% from some other races, and 1.61% from two or more races. Hispanic or Latino people of any race were 1.89% of the population.

Of the 733 households, 30.8% had children under18 living with them, 47.7% were married couples living together, 7.1% had a female householder with no husband present, 5.9% had a male householder with no wife present, and 39.3% were not families. About 34.7% of households were one person and 15.7% were one person 65 or older. The average household size was 2.30, and the average family size was 2.94.

The median age was 40.2 years; the age distribution was 24.8% under 18, 6.9% from 18 to 24, 23.6% from 25 to 44, 26.8% from 45 to 64, and 17.8% were 65 or older. The gender makeup of the city was 51.1% male and 48.9% female.

=== 2000 census ===
As of the 2000 census, there were 1,435 people, 619 households, and 378 families residing in the city. The population density was 964.85 inhabitants per square mile (372.5/km^{2}). There were 790 housing units at an average density of 531.17 per square mile (205.09/km^{2}). The racial makeup of the city was 94.91% White, 0.21% African American, 3.83% Native American, 0.07% Asian, and 0.98% from two or more races. Hispanic or Latino people of any race were 1.11% of the population.

Of the 619 households, 28.4% had children under 18 living with them, 48.9% were married couples living together, 8.7% had a female householder with no husband present, and 38.8% were not families. About 37.5% of households were one person and 22.0% were one person 65 or older. The average household size was 2.22, and the average family size was 2.91.

The age distribution was 24.8% under 18, 5.7% from 18 to 24, 20.4% from 25 to 44, 24.8% from 45 to 64, and 24.3% 65 or older. The median age was 44 years. For every 100 females, there were 88.8 males. For every 100 females 18 and over, there were 83.8 males.

The median income was $29,688 for a household and $36,850 for a family. Males had a median income of $32,250 versus $21,193 for females. The per capita income for the city was $18,084. About 9.8% of families and 12.2% of the population were below the poverty line, including 15.0% of those under 18 and 13.9% of those 65 or over.

== Transportation ==
Northwest Dakota Public Transit provides dial-a-ride transit in the city. The service, run by the Williston Council for the Aging, operates weekdays from 7:30 am to 4:00 pm and 5:00 pm to 9:00 pm for a $3 fare.

== Education ==
- Badlands Elementary School
- Fox Hills Elementary School
- Watford City Middle School
- Watford City High School

== Sites of interest ==
- Theodore Roosevelt National Park (North Unit), 15 miles (24 km) to the south
- Maah Daah Hey Trail
- McKenzie County Heritage Park
- Long X Trading Post Visitor Center
- Pioneer Museum of McKenzie County
