= Basin Safety Consulting Corporation =

- Company type: Private company
- Industry: Oilfield services
- Founded: 2012; 14 years ago
- Headquarters: Williston, North Dakota
- Key people: Jonathon Greiner (CEO)
- Products: Safety training; Health and safety consulting; Gas monitors; Respirators; Fire extinguishers
- Website: basinsafetyus.com

Basin Safety Consulting Corporation is a health and safety company based in Williston, North Dakota. Positioned in the petroleum-rich Williston Basin, Basin has provided services such as on-site consulting, safety training, equipment servicing, and compliance programs to clients in the oil and gas industry since 2012. The company serves the Williston, Minot, Sidney, and Dickinson areas.

== History ==
Basin Safety was founded in 2012 during the North Dakota oil boom. Its original focus was safety training, but, gaining traction primarily through word of mouth, it expanded its services to include on-site consultation and risk assessment, equipment sales and servicing, safety manual development, compliance management, and environmental programs.

As prices dropped and the oil market slowed in the latter half of 2014, many companies serving the oilfield were driven out of business or prompted to pare their workforce down to a skeleton crew. During this season, according to CEO Jonathon Greiner, Basin continued its expansion. "All of our competitors have gone out of business," Greiner said in an interview with Reuters. "Our existing clients are giving us too much work." Greiner cites the company's diversified clientele (which as of 2015 included oilfield, agriculture, construction, and rail) and its use of cloud-based systems as a reason it survived the changing oil market.

== Partnerships ==
Basin is a member of the North Dakota Petroleum Council and the North Dakota Safety Council. The company has sponsored local events including the Williston Chamber of Commerce awards banquet, Rockin' Ribfest, and a local open mic.

== Recognition ==
- 2016: Finalist for American Petroleum Institute's Outstanding Achievement award
- 2018: Honoree of Williston Herald's 20 under 40 (Owner Jonathon Greiner)
