= Space Aliens Grill & Bar =

Restaurant chain in North Dakota and Minnesota, United States

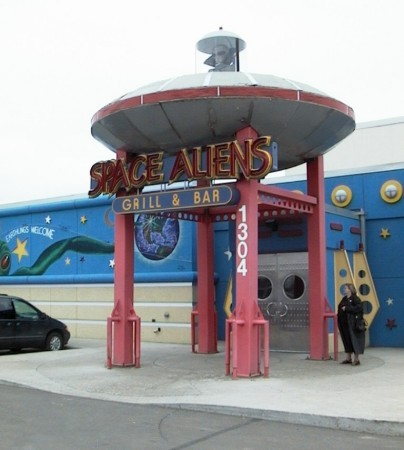
- Space Aliens Grill & Bar in Bismarck, North Dakota
- Type: Private
- Founded: 1997
- Founder: Mort Bank; Dave Glaser; Sheila Glaser
- Headquarters: Bismarck, North Dakota
- Website: spacealiens.com

Space Aliens Grill & Bar is a small regional chain of outer space-themed restaurants in the U.S. states of North Dakota and Minnesota. There are currently three locations. One in Bismarck, ND, one in Fargo, ND, and one in Albertville, MN. The company was founded in 1997 and is currently based in Bismarck, North Dakota.

== History ==
Space Aliens opened its first location in Bismarck, North Dakota in 1997. In 1999, a second location opened in Fargo, North Dakota. The owners then decided to turn the idea into a franchise. The first franchise opened in May 2003 in Waite Park, Minnesota, followed by a second in Albertville, Minnesota in 2006, and a third in Minot, North Dakota in 2006. The Minot location closed in 2012. A fourth franchise opened in Blaine, Minnesota in May 2007 but closed in October 2010. The newest location opened in January 2009 in Grand Forks, North Dakota, but closed in 2012.

== Space theme ==
Space Aliens restaurants are characterized by futuristic-looking exteriors with a large domed ceiling in the center of the building, painted to show a view of outer space. Statues of aliens and other themed objects are displayed throughout the restaurant. Some restaurants also feature Galaxy Games, an arcade room. The bar area is called The Bar from Mars, with a party room called Area 51.

== Food ==
Space Aliens is best known for its barbecued ribs and fire-roasted pizza. It has a wide selection of other food, including steaks, hamburgers and quesadillas.

== Founder notoriety ==
Space Aliens founder Mort Bank gained national notoriety in 2012 when he sold a gallon of "McJordan BBQ Sauce", from his time as a McDonald's operator, on eBay for $9,995.

== Locations ==
=== Current ===
- Bismarck, North Dakota (opened January 1997)
- Fargo, North Dakota (opened December 1999)
- Albertville, Minnesota (opened April 2006)

=== Former ===
- Waite Park, Minnesota (opened May 2003; closed 2014)
- Minot, North Dakota (opened June 2006; closed 2012)
- Blaine, Minnesota (opened 2007; closed 2010)
- Grand Forks, North Dakota (opened January 2009; closed 2012)
