= NoDak Films =

- Company type: Private
- Industry: Film
- Founded: 2010
- Founders: Nathan Anderson
- Headquarters: United States
- Products: Independent films

Nodak Films is an independent production company based out of North Dakota founded by Nathan Anderson in order to produce fictional, feature-length films also set in the state. The first movie from this company, Last Summer for Boys, started filming in 2010 and premiered in Bismarck on September 21, 2012, as well as being released on DVD, with part of the proceeds being donated to the North Dakota Flood Fight program.

The project was given regional media coverage, inviting North Dakotans to participate. Castings were held in Fargo.

Called "the first sustainable filmmaking company" by the director, the funding scheme for the project company relies on contributions by users or companies, which ensure a part in the movie or product placement. The initial contributors included former North Dakota governors, and mayors of North Dakota towns.

Each contribution is backed by a contract that guarantees a full refund if production ceases, which is reviewed by the North Dakota Securities Commission. The funding model came about as a response to a rejection by the Bank of North Dakota, due to the failure of the last state-funded film, "Wooly Boys" in 2001.
