= Swanson Health Products =

American distributor of vitamins and supplements

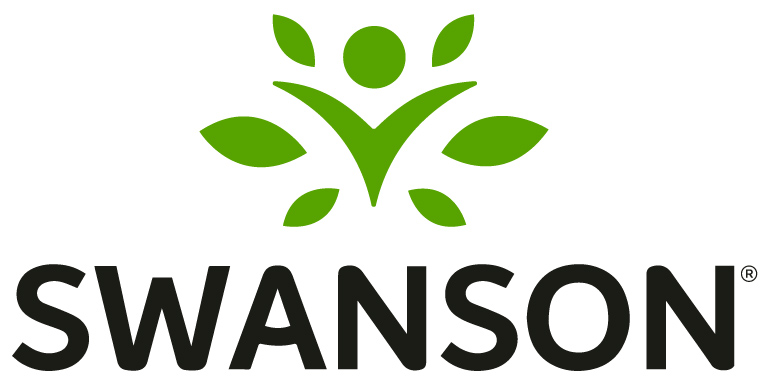
- Type: Private
- Industry: Health products
- Founded: 1969; 57 years ago
- Headquarters: Fargo, North Dakota
- Key people: CEO: Jim Hamel (2021-Current)
- Brands: Lee Swanson Signature Line, Swanson Ultra, Swanson Premium Brand, Swanson Superior Herbs, Swanson EFAs, Swanson Condition Specific Formulas, Swanson Best Weight-control Formulas, Swanson Certified Organic, Swanson GreenFoods Formulas, Swanson Passion, Swanson Kyoto, Swanson Probiotics, Swanson Best Garlic Supplements, Swanson Brand Aromatherapy, Swanson Healthy Home, Swanson, Swanson pH Balance, Swanson Pet Nutrition, Swanson FIT, Swanson Health Products OTC, Swanson Rejuv, Swanson Peak Performance (SPP), Swanson Healthy Foods
- Revenue: US$500 million (2015 est.)
- Number of employees: 250 (2018)
- Website: www.swansonvitamins.com

Swanson Health Products (SHP) is a natural health catalog and Internet marketing company headquartered in Fargo, North Dakota.

== History ==
Swanson Health Products was founded in 1969 in Fargo, North Dakota, by Leland Swanson Sr. The company initially sold vitamins and dietary supplements by mail order.

By 1980, SHP was operating with about 10 employees from a storefront in downtown Fargo. In 1982, the company moved its mail order manufacturing and shipping operations to a 15,000 sq ft (1,400 m^{2}) facility. During the 1990s, the company expanded its mail order business to the internet.

In 2001, the company moved its operations to a 120,000 sq ft (11,000 m^{2}) facility in Fargo. The facility housed its customer service, marketing, manufacturing, storage, and shipping operations.

In January 2016, Leland Swanson, Jr. retired and SHP was acquired by Swander Pace Capital, a private equity firm specializing in investments in growth-oriented, middle-market consumer-products companies.

In January 2019, the company started selling products containing cannabidiol from industrial hemp, which was federally legalized in the 2018 Farm Bill.

== Products and quality control ==
Swanson Health Products carries vitamins, dietary supplements, and other health-related consumer products. The company has more than 20 Swanson-branded lines related to some over-the-counter medication, personal-care products, household products, and organic foods.

Since 2001, SHP has participated in independent third-party Good Manufacturing Practices (GMP) audits to maintain high-quality finished products. The company has also had products reviewed by ConsumerLab.com for safety and efficacy.

== FDA actions ==
Swanson Health Products has had a few encounters with the United States Food and Drug Administration (FDA), which oversees the marketing and labeling of dietary supplements to ensure they are not labeled as unapproved drugs. In 2007, SHP received a warning letter from the FDA stating that the company was selling an unapproved version of the prescription cholesterol drug called Mevacor. FDA laboratory analysis determined that two of SHP's red yeast rice supplements contained significant amounts of lovastatin, the active ingredient in Mevacor and its generic counterparts. The FDA letter stated, “Because Red Yeast Rice and Red Yeast Rice/Policosanol Complex contain red yeast rice with enhanced or added lovastatin and bear claims about lipid control and other cardiovascular benefits supplied by this ingredient, they cannot be marketed as dietary supplements.”
