= Arnegard, North Dakota =

- City
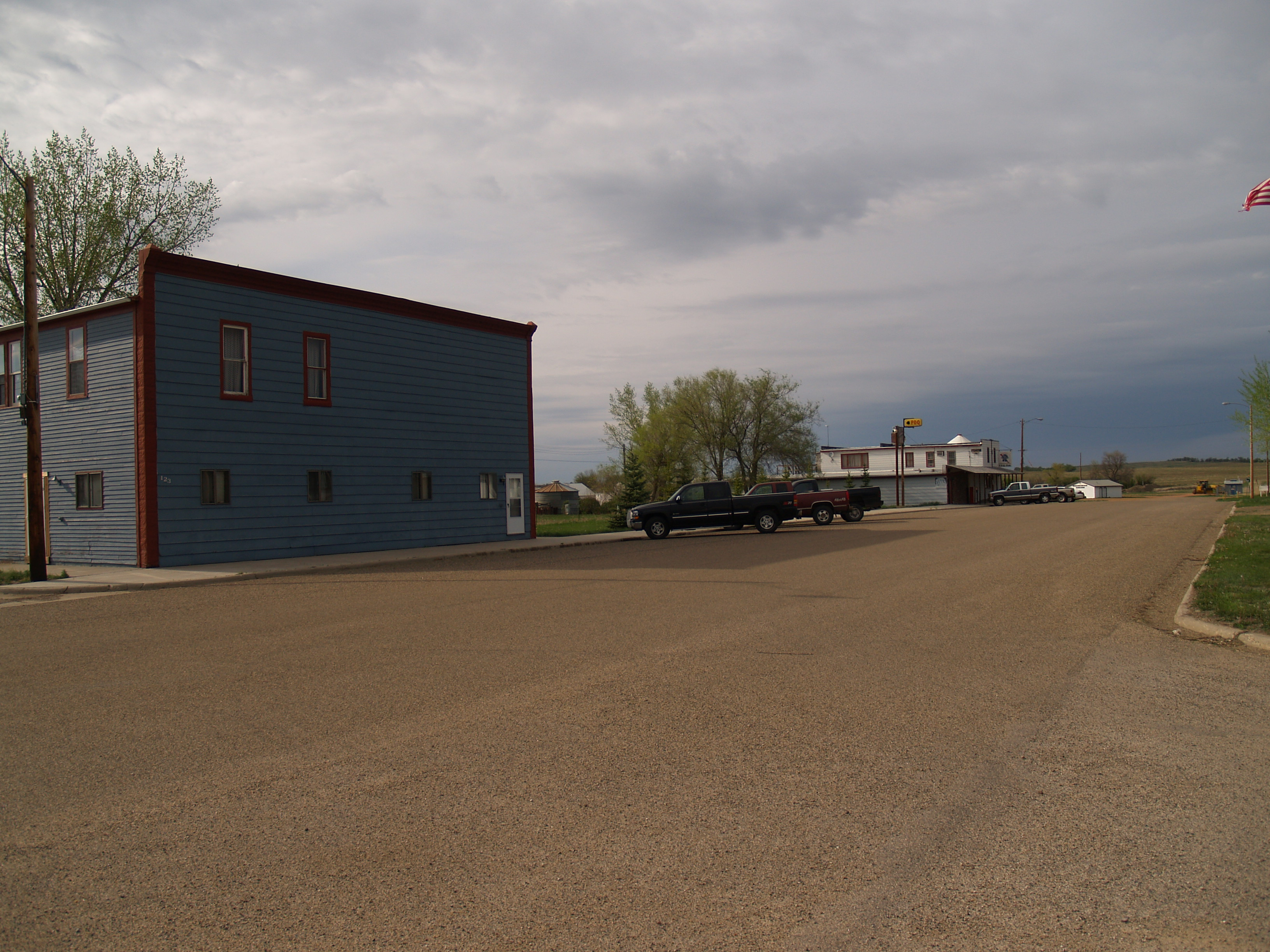
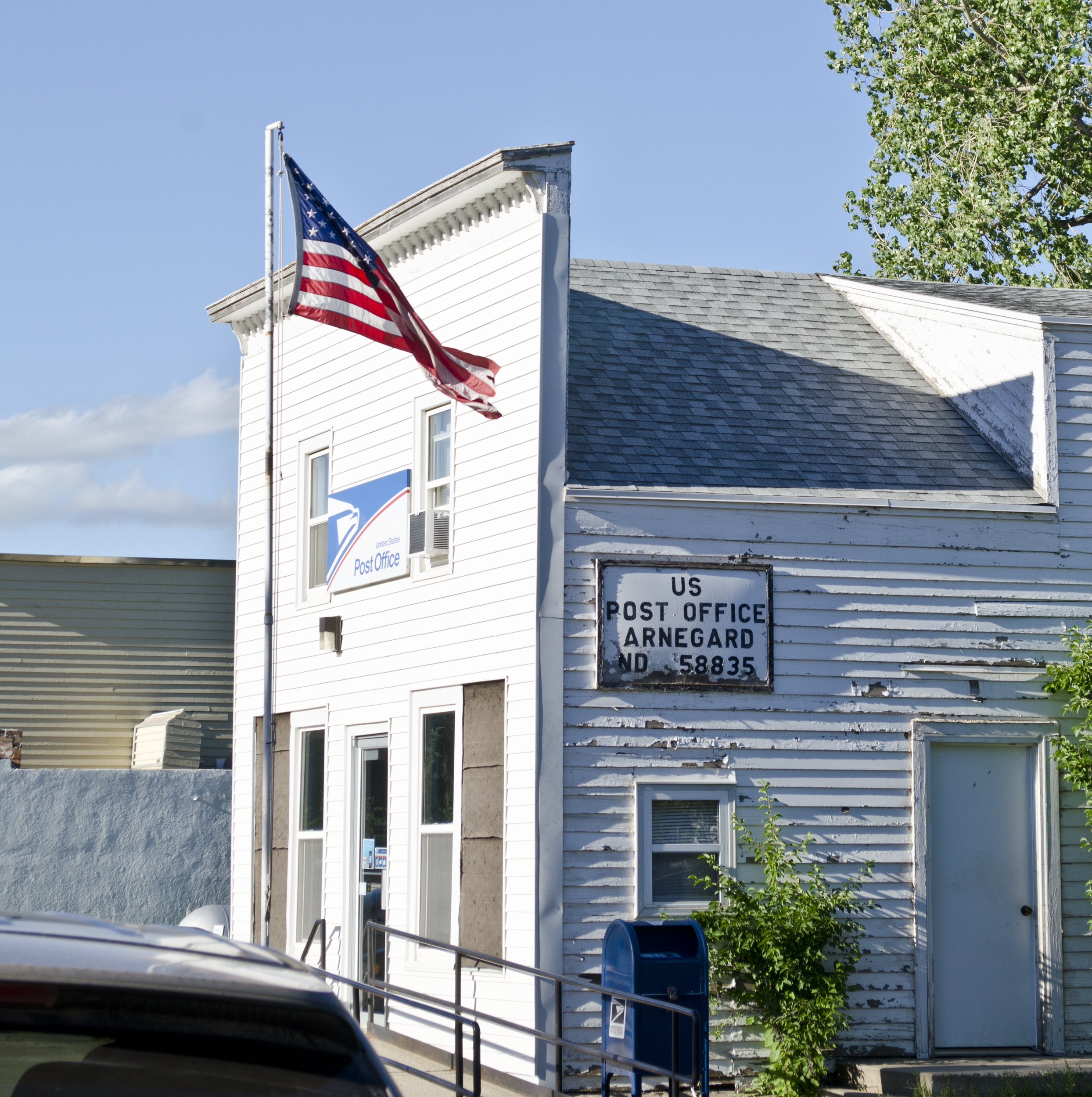
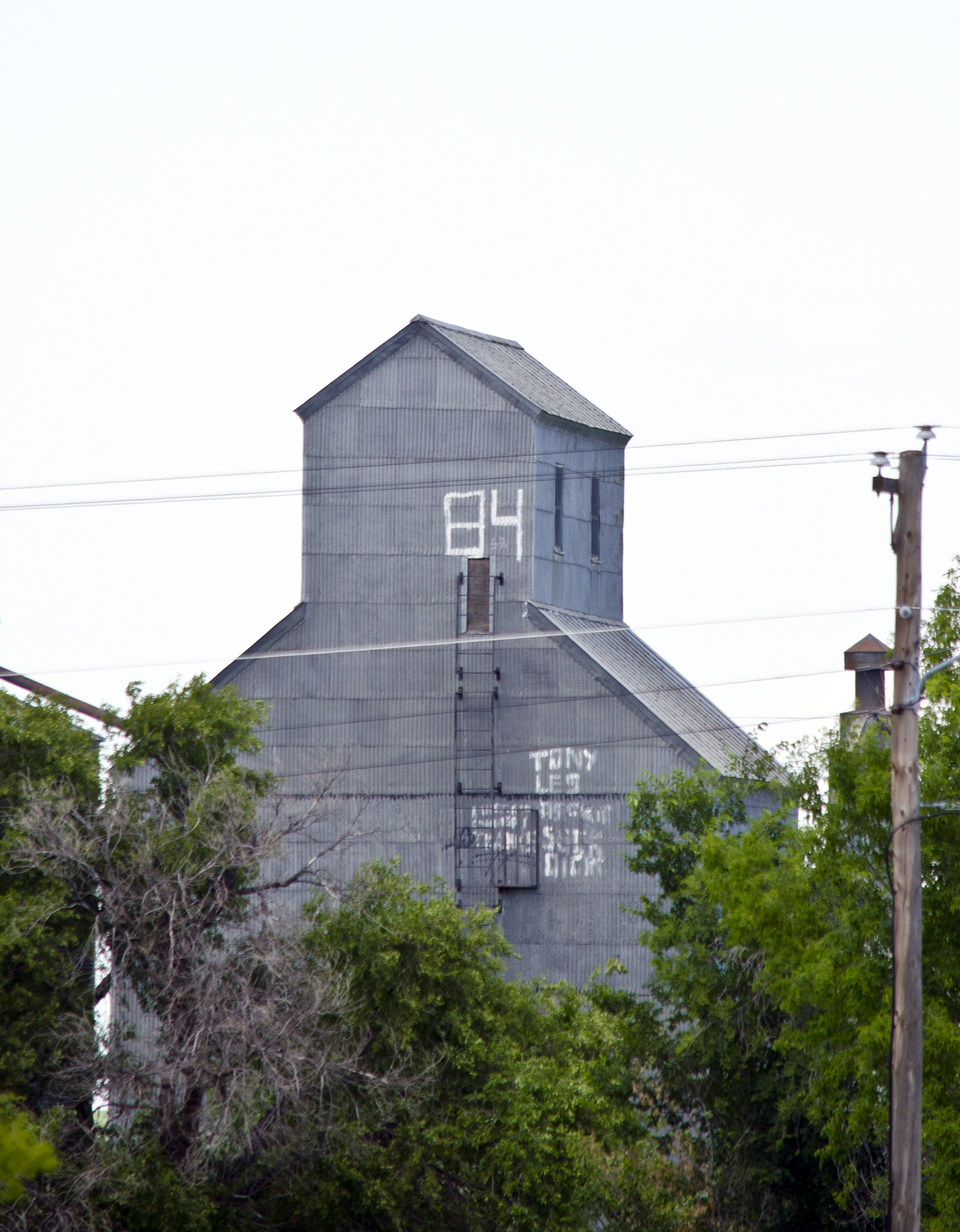
- Buildings in Arnegard. Arnegard Post Office. Looking north at the old grain elevator on the north side of town in Arnegard.
- Interactive map of Arnegard, North Dakota
- Location within North Dakota Location within the United States
- Coordinates: 47.8065°N 103.4426°W
- Country: United States
- State: North Dakota
- County: McKenzie
- Established: July 14, 1906
- Platted: 1913
- Incorporated: 1920

Government
  - Mayor: Lowell Mosby

Area
  - Total: 0.341 sq mi (0.882 km^{2})
  - Land: 0.341 sq mi (0.882 km^{2})
  - Water: 0 sq mi (0.000 km^{2}) 0.00%
- Elevation: 2,244 ft (684 m)

Population (2020)
  - Total: 282
  - Estimate (2025): 294
  - Density: 828/sq mi (320/km^{2})
- Time zone: UTC–6 (Central (CST))
  - Summer (DST): UTC–5 (CDT)
- ZIP Code: 58835
- Area code: 701
- FIPS code: 38-03220
- GNIS feature ID: 1035915
- Website: arnegardnd.com

Arnegard is a city in McKenzie County, North Dakota, United States. The population was 282 as of the 2020 census, and was estimated at 294 in 2025.

== History ==
Arnegard was founded in 1906 and is named for brothers Evan Arnegard and Oscar Arnegard, the first homesteaders in the area. The first church was a one-room log cabin, the Wilmington Lutheran Church. It was so named because most of the people who founded Arnegard came from Spring Grove, Minnesota, where they belonged to the Old Wilmington Lutheran Church. The post office was established July 14, 1906 with Gerhard A. Stenehjem as postmaster. The town was incorporated in 1913 when the Great Northern Railroad extended its line past Watford City to Arnegard.

In 1914, the town built the Arnegard School, a one-story, four room school which taught grades 1 through 12. It opened on January 29, 1915. AS second story and rear annex was built in June 1936. Included were four more classrooms and a library on the second floor, and a gym and principal's office in the rear. The annex was torn down in 1954, and a much larger gym built. By then, the Arnegard Spuds basketball team was winning games throughout the state, and wrestlers too were winning awards. In 1961, the school won the State Class C Boys' Basketball Championship. The high school closed in 1963 due to declining enrollment, but elementary school classes continued to be held in the structure until 1976. McKenzie County donated the building to the city of Arnegard shortly thereafter, and it was used as a roller skating rink, town library, and meeting hall. By the early 1980s, the second floor was considered unsafe, and the building eventually closed. In 1998, local man Milton Hanson purchased the structure and completely renovated it. It was then operated as the "Old School Bed & Breakfast", and has been featured on HGTV's "If Walls Could Talk" and Prairie Public TV's "Old to New: Remodel, Restore, Revitalize". In 2015 it was sold, without the bell, and is no longer a bed and breakfast.

Arnegard suffered a horrible fire on its Main Street in January 1959. Cleanup had barely begun when a second fire occurred in March. But by 1961, most of the structures on Main Street had been rebuilt.

Arnegard was founded with about 100 people living there, and it reached its peak population of 254 in 1930. The town weathered the Great Depression well enough, but by 1940 the population was down to just 222 (a loss of 12.5 percent). The population stayed relatively steady until 1960, but dropped by almost 40 percent to just 141 people in 1970. A brief surge in population during the 1970s oil boom (oil and natural gas deposits were found beneath McKenzie County about 1974), but the boom was followed by a bust in 1980 as drillers discovered that most of the oil was locked in shale which (at the time) could not be reached. By 1990, the population was 122, and by 2000 it was just 105. Arnegard has seen a small uptick in population in the 2000s attributable to the North Dakota Oil Boom.

On March 6, 2019, the city's two police officers were dismissed by the city council with Mayor Virginia Elliot breaking the tie vote. The officers had recently filed a grievance citing hostile work environment. The two council members who voted to dismiss had been previously charged with crimes by the officers, while Mayor Elliot was under investigation for various crimes at the time of the dismissal.

== Geography ==
According to the United States Census Bureau, the city has a total area of 0.340 square miles (0.88 km^{2}), all land.

== Demographics ==
Historical population
Census	Pop.	Note	%±
1930	254		—
1940	222		−12.6%
1950	206		−7.2%
1960	228		10.7%
1970	141		−38.2%
1980	193		36.9%
1990	122		−36.8%
2000	105		−13.9%
2010	115		9.5%
2020	282		145.2%
2025 (est.)	294		4.3%
U.S. Decennial Census; 2020 Census

=== 2020 census ===
As of the 2020 census, there were 282 people, 98 households, and 71 families residing in the city.

=== 2010 census ===
As of the 2010 census, there were 115 people, 47 households, and 31 families residing in the city. The population density was 460.0 inhabitants per square mile (177.6/km^{2}). There were 59 housing units at an average density of 236.0 per square mile (91.1/km^{2}). The racial makup of the city was 97.4% White, 0.9% Native American, and 1.7% from two or more races. Hispanic or Latino of any race were 1.7%.

There were 47 households 29.8% had children under the age of 18 living with them, 51.1% were married couples living together, 6.4% had a female householder with no husband present, 8.5% had a male householder with no wife present, and 34.0% were non-families. 27.7% of households were one person and 6.4% were one person aged 65 or older. The average household size was 2.45 and the average family size was 2.94.

The median age was 41.3 years. 28.7% of residents were under the age of 18; 8.8% were between the ages of 18 and 24; 15.6% were from 25 to 44; 36.5% were from 45 to 64; and 10.4% were 65 or older. The gender makeup of the city was 58.3% male and 41.7% female.

=== 2000 census ===
As of the 2000 census, there were 105 people, 44 households, and 23 families residing in the city. The population density was 415.5 inhabitants per square mile (160.4/km^{2}). There were 60 housing units at an average density of 237.4 per square mile (91.7/km^{2}). The racial makeup of the city was 97.14% White, 0.00% African American, 0.00% Native American, 0.00% Asian, 0.00% Pacific Islander, 0.00% from some other races and 2.86% from two or more races. Hispanic or Latino people of any race were 0.00% of the population.

There were 44 households out of which 29.5% have children under the age of 18 living with them, 50.0% were married couples living together, 0.0% have a female householder with no husband present, and 45.5% were non-families. 40.9% of all households were made up of individuals and 31.8% have someone living alone who was 65 years of age or older. The average household size was 2.39 and the average family size was 3.46.

In the city the population was spread out with 31.4% under the age of 18, 4.8% from 18 to 24, 23.8% from 25 to 44, 20.0% from 45 to 64, and 20.0% who were 65 years of age or older. The median age was 40 years. For every 100 females there were 101.9 males. For every 100 females age 18 and over, there were 105.7 males.

The median income for a household in the city was $27,857, and the median income for a family was $37,188. Males have a median income of $27,500 versus $18,750 for females. The per capita income for the city was $14,831. 1.1% of the population and 0.0% of families were below the poverty line. Out of the total people living in poverty, 0.0% were under the age of 18 and 0.0% were 65 or older.

== Notable person ==
- Orville W. Hagen, 27th Lieutenant Governor of North Dakota
