= Hirschville, North Dakota =

- Unincorporated community
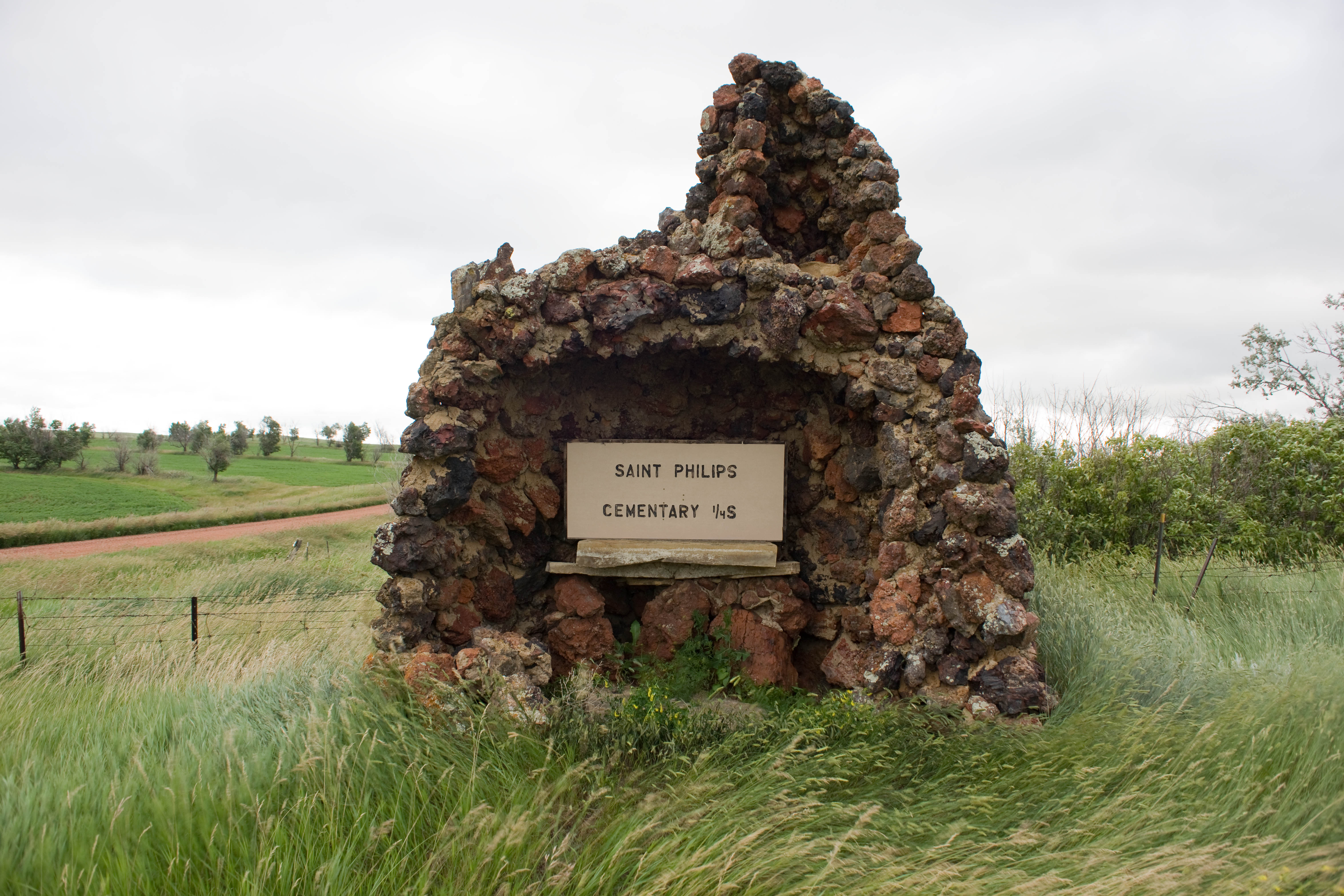
- St. Philip's Cemetery in Hirschville

- Location within the state of North Dakota Hirschville (the United States)
- Coordinates: 47°04′05″N 102°33′50″W
- Country: United States
- State: North Dakota
- County: Dunn
- Elevation: 2,123 ft (647 m)
- Time zone: UTC-6 (Central (CST))
  - Summer (DST): UTC-5 (CDT)
- Area code: 701
- GNIS feature ID: 1029476

Hirschville is an unincorporated community in Dunn County, North Dakota, United States.

== History ==
The Hirschville area was settled by German-Hungarians and German-Russians.

== Post office ==
On May 11, 1911, a U.S. post office was annexed to the general store. The mail route was connected to Taylor in neighboring Stark County. The station was called Hirschville in commemoration of its founder, Casper Hirsch (1865–1931, name sometimes also spelled Kaspar or Kasper). Pius Stockie (1885–1960) was appointed mail carrier. Casper Hirsch served as the postmaster at Hirschville until he relocated to Wisconsin in 1917. The Hirschville post office was discontinued in 1920.

== Church ==
St. Philip's Parish was established in 1907. On December 12, 1910, Casper and Marianna Hirsch donated 6 acres (24,000 m^{2}) of land for St. Philip's Catholic Church to hold services for German-speaking immigrants. Shortly after the church was completed, Casper Hirsch established a grocery and hardware store nearby. In 1916 a fair was held in Hirschville to raise money for a new church building there. The new church served a congregation of 130 families when it was completed. In the 1990s, the Hirschville church was a mission church of Saints Peter and Paul Church in New Hradec.

By the late 1990s, the church's active congregation had declined to only a dozen families at most, and a farewell mass was held at the church on June 27, 1998. Although there was local interest in preserving the church with support from the National Trust for Historic Preservation, the church was burned in 2000.
