= Dickinson micropolitan area, North Dakota =

Area consisting of two counties in North Dakota

Dickinson metropolitan area
- Micropolitan statistical area
- Dickinson, ND Metropolitan Statistical Area
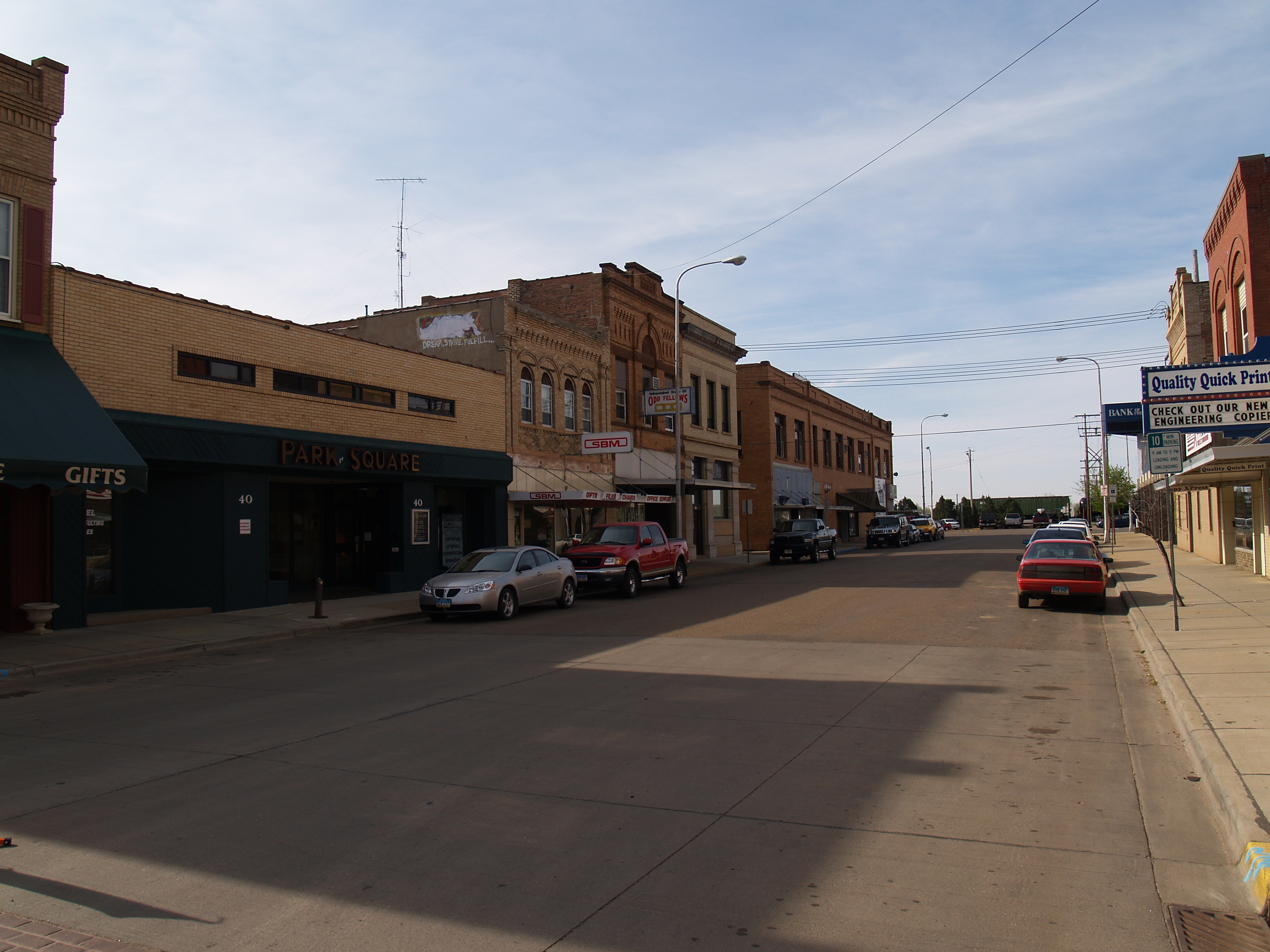
- Downtown Dickinson (2008)
Map of Dickinson, ND μSA
City of Dickinson
Dickinson, ND μSA
- Country: United States
- State: North Dakota
- Largest city: Dickinson
- Other cities: Belfield, Killdeer, Medora, Richardton

Area
  - Total: 4,491.91 sq mi (11,634.0 km^{2})

Population (2020)
  - Total: 38,686
  - Estimate (2024): 38,861 ▲
  - Rank: 333rd in the U.S.
  - Density: 8.65/sq mi (3.341/km^{2})
- Time zone: UTC–7 (MST)
  - Summer (DST): UTC–6 (MDT)
- Area codes: 701

The Dickinson Micropolitan Statistical Area, as defined by the Census Bureau as comprising all of Billings, Dunn, and Stark Counties in North Dakota, anchored by the city of Dickinson. As of the 2020 census, the population was 38,686 and was estimated to be 38,861 in 2024.

== Counties ==
- Billings (1,063)
- Dunn (4,031)
- Stark (33,767)

== Communities ==
=== Incorporated Places ===
- Dickinson (25,695)
- Belfield (992)
- Killdeer (912)
- Richardton (687)
- South Heart (414)
- Gladstone (279)
- Halliday (233)
- Dunn Center (229)
- Taylor (228)
- Medora (160)
- Dodge (83)

=== Census-designated places ===
- Manning (47)

=== Unincorporated Places ===
- Daglum
- Eland
- Emerson
- Fairfield
- Fryburg
- Gorham
- Hirschville
- Lefor
- Marshall
- New Hradec
- Oakdale
- Schefield
- Sully Springs
- Twin Buttes
- Werner
- Zenith

=== Ghost town ===
- Ukraina

== Demographics ==
Historical population
Census	Pop.	Note	%±
1880	1,323		—
1890	2,633		99.0%
1900	8,596		226.5%
1910	27,992		225.6%
1920	25,496		−8.9%
1930	28,046		10.0%
1940	26,321		−6.2%
1950	25,126		−4.5%
1960	26,314		4.7%
1970	25,706		−2.3%
1980	29,462		14.6%
1990	27,945		−5.1%
2000	27,124		−2.9%
2010	28,518		5.1%
2020	38,686		35.7%
2024 (est.)	38,861		0.5%
U.S. Decennial Census; 1790–1960 1900–1990; 1990–2000 2010–2020

=== 2020 census ===
As of the 2020 census, there were 38,686 people, 15,525 households, and 9,720 families residing in the μSA. The population density was 29,998.92 inhabitants per square mile (11,582.6/km^{2}). There were 18,053 housing units at an average density of 0.0 per square mile (0.0/km^{2}). The racial makeup of the μSA was 85.59% White, 2.79% African American, 2.41% Native American, 1.02% Asian, 0.14% Pacific Islander, 2.50% from some other races and 5.54% from two or more races. Hispanic or Latino people of any race were 6.21% of the population.

In the 2000 census, the median income for a household in the μSA was $32,597, and the median income for a family was $38,639. Males had a median income of $31,487 versus $20,500 for females. The per capita income for the μSA was $16,058.

== See also ==
- Micropolitan statistical area
- North Dakota census statistical areas
