= North Dakota statistical areas =

Coordinates: 47.4501°N 100.4659°W

The U.S. State of North Dakota currently has nine statistical areas that have been delineated by the Office of Management and Budget (OMB). On July 21, 2023, the OMB delineated one combined statistical area, four metropolitan statistical areas, and four micropolitan statistical areas in North Dakota. As of 2025, the largest of these is the Fargo–Wahpeton, ND-MN CSA, comprising the area around Fargo, North Dakota's largest city.

== Statistical areas ==
The Office of Management and Budget (OMB) has designated more than 1,000 statistical areas for the United States and Puerto Rico. These statistical areas are important geographic delineations of population clusters used by the OMB, the United States Census Bureau, planning organizations, and federal, state, and local government entities.

The OMB defines a core-based statistical area (commonly referred to as a CBSA) as the county or counties (or county-equivalents) surrounding at least one densely-settled core of at least 10,000 population, "plus adjacent counties having a high degree of social and economic integration with the core as measured through commuting ties with the counties containing the core". The OMB further divides core-based statistical areas based on population into metropolitan statistical areas (MSAs) for those with at least 50,000 and micropolitan statistical areas (μSAs) for those with 10,000 to 49,999 people.

The OMB defines a combined statistical area (CSA) as two or more adjacent core-based statistical areas where the employment interchange rate (% commuting from A to B plus % commuting from B to A) is at least 15%. The primary statistical areas (PSAs) include all combined statistical areas and any core-based statistical area that is not a constituent of a combined statistical area.

The nine United States statistical areas and 53 counties of the State of North Dakota (Note: An out-of-state area and its population are displayed in green. An area that extends into more than one state is displayed in purple. A purple population number over a black population number show the total population versus the in-state population. The state's abbreviation is also shown next to the in-state total.)
| Combined statistical area | 2025 population (est.) | Core-based statistical area | 2025 population (est.) | County | 2025 population (est.) |
|---|---|---|---|---|---|
| Fargo–Wahpeton, ND-MN CSA | 292,547; 218,525 (ND) | Fargo, ND-MN MSA | 269,528; 201,794 (ND) | Cass County, North Dakota | 201,794 |
| Fargo–Wahpeton, ND-MN CSA | 292,547; 218,525 (ND) | Fargo, ND-MN MSA | 269,528; 201,794 (ND) | Clay County, Minnesota | 67,734 |
| Fargo–Wahpeton, ND-MN CSA | 292,547; 218,525 (ND) | Wahpeton, ND-MN μSA | 23,019; 16,731 (ND) | Richland County, North Dakota | 16,731 |
| Fargo–Wahpeton, ND-MN CSA | 292,547; 218,525 (ND) | Wahpeton, ND-MN μSA | 23,019; 16,731 (ND) | Wilkin County, Minnesota | 6,288 |
| none | | Bismarck, ND MSA | 139,750 | Burleigh County, North Dakota | 103,251 |
| none | | Bismarck, ND MSA | 139,750 | Morton County, North Dakota | 34,601 |
| none | | Bismarck, ND MSA | 139,750 | Oliver County, North Dakota | 1,898 |
| none | | Minot, ND MSA | 75,694 | Ward County, North Dakota | 68,233 |
| none | | Minot, ND MSA | 75,694 | McHenry County, North Dakota | 5,130 |
| none | | Minot, ND MSA | 75,694 | Renville County, North Dakota | 2,331 |
| none | | Grand Forks, ND-MN MSA | 105,046; 74,501 (ND) | Grand Forks County, North Dakota | 74,501 |
| none | | Grand Forks, ND-MN MSA | 105,046; 74,501 (ND) | Polk County, Minnesota | 30,545 |
| none | | Williston, ND μSA | 41,767 | Williams County, North Dakota | 41,767 |
| none | | Dickinson, ND μSA | 39,142 | Stark County, North Dakota | 34,013 |
| none | | Dickinson, ND μSA | 39,142 | Dunn County, North Dakota | 4,058 |
| none | | Dickinson, ND μSA | 39,142 | Billings County, North Dakota | 1,071 |
| none | | Jamestown, ND μSA | 21,414 | Stutsman County, North Dakota | 21,414 |
| none | | none | | McKenzie County, North Dakota | 15,192 |
| none | | none | | Rolette County, North Dakota | 11,688 |
| none | | none | | Ramsey County, North Dakota | 11,530 |
| none | | none | | Barnes County, North Dakota | 10,573 |
| none | | none | | Walsh County, North Dakota | 10,179 |
| none | | none | | McLean County, North Dakota | 9,740 |
| none | | none | | Mountrail County, North Dakota | 9,395 |
| none | | none | | Mercer County, North Dakota | 8,441 |
| none | | none | | Traill County, North Dakota | 7,920 |
| none | | none | | Pembina County, North Dakota | 6,568 |
| none | | none | | Bottineau County, North Dakota | 6,284 |
| none | | none | | Benson County, North Dakota | 5,759 |
| none | | none | | Ransom County, North Dakota | 5,617 |
| none | | none | | Dickey County, North Dakota | 4,895 |
| none | | none | | LaMoure County, North Dakota | 4,135 |
| none | | none | | Pierce County, North Dakota | 3,838 |
| none | | none | | Wells County, North Dakota | 3,729 |
| none | | none | | Sargent County, North Dakota | 3,711 |
| none | | none | | Sioux County, North Dakota | 3,667 |
| none | | none | | Cavalier County, North Dakota | 3,497 |
| none | | none | | Emmons County, North Dakota | 3,215 |
| none | | none | | Foster County, North Dakota | 3,212 |
| none | | none | | Nelson County, North Dakota | 2,963 |
| none | | none | | Bowman County, North Dakota | 2,762 |
| none | | none | | Hettinger County, North Dakota | 2,492 |
| none | | none | | McIntosh County, North Dakota | 2,451 |
| none | | none | | Kidder County, North Dakota | 2,393 |
| none | | none | | Eddy County, North Dakota | 2,329 |
| none | | none | | Adams County, North Dakota | 2,275 |
| none | | none | | Griggs County, North Dakota | 2,239 |
| none | | none | | Grant County, North Dakota | 2,206 |
| none | | none | | Burke County, North Dakota | 2,132 |
| none | | none | | Divide County, North Dakota | 2,110 |
| none | | none | | Towner County, North Dakota | 2,040 |
| none | | none | | Logan County, North Dakota | 1,859 |
| none | | none | | Golden Valley County, North Dakota | 1,808 |
| none | | none | | Steele County, North Dakota | 1,797 |
| none | | none | | Sheridan County, North Dakota | 1,296 |
| none | | none | | Slope County, North Dakota | 628 |
| State of North Dakota | | | | | 799,358 |

The eight core-based statistical areas of the State of North Dakota (Note: For CBSAs comprising populations from multiple states, they are listed twice to show both their intrastate population within that CBSA as well as the CBSA's total population. Only the intrastate population is ranked.)
| 2025 rank | Core-based statistical area | Population | | | | |
| 2025 rank | Core-based statistical area | 2025 estimate | Change | 2020 Census | Change | 2010 Census |
|---|---|---|---|---|---|---|
| 1 | Fargo, ND-MN MSA (ND) | 201,794 | +9.36% | 184,525 | +23.20% | 149,778 |
| 2 | Bismarck, ND MSA | 139,750 | +4.58% | 133,626 | +20.79% | 110,625 |
| 3 | Minot, ND MSA | 75,694 | −2.39% | 77,546 | +11.51% | 69,540 |
| 4 | Grand Forks, ND-MN MSA (ND) | 74,501 | +1.82% | 73,170 | +9.44% | 66,861 |
| 5 | Williston, ND μSA | 41,767 | +2.00% | 40,950 | +82.83% | 22,398 |
| 6 | Dickinson, ND μSA | 39,142 | +1.18% | 38,686 | +35.65% | 28,518 |
| 7 | Jamestown, ND μSA | 21,414 | −0.83% | 21,593 | +2.34% | 21,100 |
| 8 | Wahpeton, ND-MN μSA (ND) | 16,731 | +1.22% | 16,529 | +1.27% | 16,321 |
| | Fargo, ND-MN MSA | 269,528 | +7.88% | 249,843 | +19.67% | 208,777 |
| | Grand Forks, ND-MN MSA | 105,046 | +0.66% | 104,362 | +5.99% | 98,461 |
| | Wahpeton, ND-MN μSA | 23,019 | −0.07% | 23,035 | +0.60% | 22,897 |

The one combined statistical area of the State of North Dakota (Note: For CSAs comprising populations from multiple states, they are listed twice to show both their intrastate population within that CSA as well as the CSA's total population. Only the intrastate population is ranked.)
| 2025 rank | Combined statistical area | Population | | | | |
| 2025 rank | Combined statistical area | 2025 estimate | Change | 2020 Census | Change | 2010 Census |
|---|---|---|---|---|---|---|
| 1 | Fargo–Wahpeton, ND-MN CSA (ND) | 218,525 | +8.69% | 201,054 | +21.04% | 166,099 |
| | Fargo–Wahpeton, ND-MN CSA | 292,547 | +7.21% | 272,878 | +17.79% | 231,674 |

== See also ==
- Geography of North Dakota
  - Demographics of North Dakota
