= Dickinson High School =

Dickinson High School may refer to:

- Dickinson High School (Dickinson, North Dakota), a public high school located in Dickinson, North Dakota
- Dickinson High School (Texas), Dickinson, Texas
- John Dickinson School (formerly John Dickinson High School), New Castle County, Delaware
- William L. Dickinson High School, Jersey City, New Jersey
