= Lefor =

- Lefor, North Dakota, a location in the United States
- Michael "Mike" Lefor, an American politician
