= Dickinson Public Schools =

Group of schools in North Dakota, US

Address
- 444 4th Street West Dickinson, North Dakota, 58601; United States

District information
- Type: Public
- Grades: PreK–12
- NCES District ID: 3800038

Students and staff
- Students: 3,810
- Teachers: 260.86
- Staff: 302.44
- Student–teacher ratio: 14.61

Other information
- Website: www.dickinson.k12.nd.us

Dickinson Public Schools is a system of public schools located in Dickinson, North Dakota. It also serves the communities of Gladstone, North Dakota and New Hradec, North Dakota.

== Schools ==
=== Elementary schools ===
- P.S. Berg Elementary School (Bulldogs)
- Heart River Elementary School (Otters)
- Jefferson Elementary School (Tommies)
- Lincoln Elementary School (Lions)
- Prairie Rose Elementary School (Panthers)
- Roosevelt Elementary School (Roughriders)

=== Junior high school ===
- A.L. Hagen Junior High School (former)
- Dickinson Middle School

=== High schools ===
- Dickinson High School (Mavericks)
- Southwest Community High School (alternative high school, located in the former A.L Hagen Junior High building
