= South Heart rail terminal =

Proposed rail transload facility

Coordinates: 46°52′27″N 103°5′29″W

The South Heart rail terminal is a proposed rail transload facility near South Heart, North Dakota. It was planned by Watco and Great Northern Project Development to support the Bakken oil and gas industry, with construction starting in 2014.

== History ==
Work on the terminal began in 2014, with completion expected sometime in 2015. The plan for the terminal included facilities for transloading frac sand, cement, and other dry bulk commodities, as well as full-service railcar repair shops operated by Watco. The terminal is located about 14 miles (23 km) west of Dickinson, North Dakota on BNSF Railway's Dickinson Subdivision, an east-west line connecting Glendive, Montana with Bismarck, North Dakota.

As of 2021, the terminal is in a state of partial completion, with grading completed for the trackage entering and exiting the terminal, but no track or structures have yet been constructed on the site. Bakken crude production declined shortly after the terminal was announced in 2014, and other nearby terminals like the Patterson Rail Terminal have been able to meet the demand for transporting crude oil by rail.
