= KDXN =

Radio station in South Heart–Dickinson, North Dakota

Coordinates: 46.948°N 102.991°W

- South Heart, North Dakota; United States
- Broadcast area: Dickinson, North Dakota
- Frequency: 105.7 MHz
- Branding: The Mix 105.7

Programming
- Format: Adult contemporary

Ownership
- Owner: Wes Glass; (Glassworks Broadcasting, LLC)

History
- First air date: 2009

Technical information
- Licensing authority: FCC
- Facility ID: 169897
- Class: C1
- ERP: 100,000 watts
- HAAT: 166 meters

Links
- Public license information: Public file; LMS
- Webcast: Listen Live
- Website: themix1057.com

KDXN is a radio station based in Dickinson, North Dakota (licensed to South Heart, North Dakota), and is owned by Wes Glass, through licensee Glassworks Broadcasting, LLC. The station is broadcasts a broad-based adult contemporary format.

The station is off the air as of December of 2025.

== History ==
The station now known as KDXN first signed on in 2010. Past KDXN owners, Totally Amped, LLC stated the business of radio was going to be a challenge, as this was an opportunity venture that was available in Dickinson, after original owners Western Edge Media, LLC went bankrupt while initially trying to start KDXN back in 2009 with a Country format. Upon the first year of broadcasting on the air, KDXN featured mostly an adult hits format. Critical reviews were welcomed on their Facebook fan page, and during the summer of 2011, an all request music program was introduced during the noon hour. As of September, 2011, The Mix 105.7 features a broadened format of newer music from the country, alternative rock, hot adult contemporary and Top 40 charts as well as songs by artists from the classic rock era not normally heard on other stations. Now, as of February 1, 2022, KDXN is owned by Glassworks Broadcasting, LLC.
