= Belfield, North Dakota =

- City
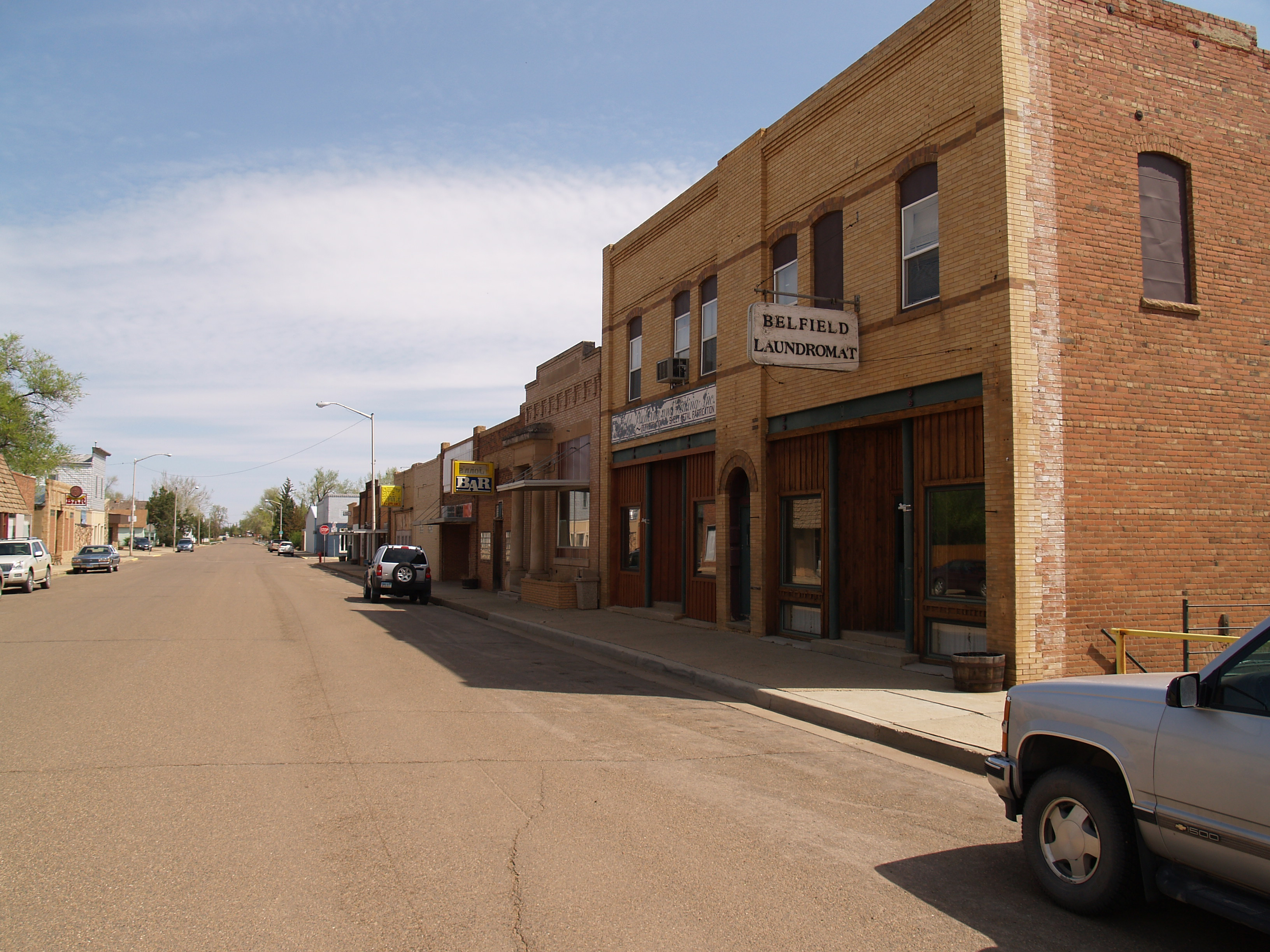
- Downtown Belfield
- Mottoes: "Gateway To The West" "Where Friends Meet On The Custer Trail"
- Downtown Belfield
- Coordinates: 46°53′10″N 103°11′44″W
- Country: United States
- State: North Dakota
- County: Stark
- Founded: 1883

Government
  - Mayor: Matthew Furlani

Area
  - Total: 1.689 sq mi (4.374 km^{2})
  - Land: 1.676 sq mi (4.341 km^{2})
  - Water: 0.013 sq mi (0.033 km^{2})
- Elevation: 2,579 ft (786 m)

Population (2020)
  - Total: 996
  - Estimate (2024): 992
  - Density: 594.3/sq mi (229.46/km^{2})
- Time zone: UTC–7 (Mountain (MST))
  - Summer (DST): UTC–6 (MDT)
- ZIP Code: 58622
- Area code: 701
- FIPS code: 38-05820
- GNIS feature ID: 1035926
- Website: www.cityofbelfield.com

Belfield is a city in Stark County, North Dakota, United States and only 15 minutes from Theodore Roosevelt National Park. The population was 996 at the 2020 census. Belfield was founded in 1883, and has seen many booms and busts in this oil-rich part of North Dakota. It is part of the Dickinson Micropolitan Statistical Area.

In 1883 Belfield was struck by a tornado that swept away nine houses but did not cause any deaths. It was known as "The Remarkable Tornado of 1883." Exactly one year later the area was hit by another tornado, which destroyed crops and caused total losses at some farms near Belfield.

== Geography ==
According to the United States Census Bureau, the city has a total area of 1.689 square miles (4.37 km^{2}), of which 1.676 square miles (4.34 km^{2}) is land and 0.013 square miles (0.03 km^{2}) is water.

=== Climate ===
Climate data for Belfield, North Dakota
| Month | Jan | Feb | Mar | Apr | May | Jun | Jul | Aug | Sep | Oct | Nov | Dec | Year |
|---|---|---|---|---|---|---|---|---|---|---|---|---|---|
| Mean daily maximum °F (°C) | 23.5 (−4.7) | 24.4 (−4.2) | 39.7 (4.3) | 51.1 (10.6) | 64 (18) | 75 (24) | 82.9 (28.3) | 81.7 (27.6) | 71.4 (21.9) | 53.8 (12.1) | 39.6 (4.2) | 24.6 (−4.1) | 52.6 (11.5) |
| Mean daily minimum °F (°C) | 9.9 (−12.3) | 11.1 (−11.6) | 25.2 (−3.8) | 34.3 (1.3) | 45.7 (7.6) | 54.9 (12.7) | 61.5 (16.4) | 60.6 (15.9) | 52.7 (11.5) | 38.7 (3.7) | 26.1 (−3.3) | 12.9 (−10.6) | 36.1 (2.3) |
| Average rainfall inches (mm) | 0.43 (11) | 0.47 (12) | 0.75 (19) | 1.22 (31) | 1.93 (49) | 1.85 (47) | 1.93 (49) | 1.46 (37) | 1.5 (38) | 1.22 (31) | 0.55 (14) | 0.47 (12) | 13.78 (350) |
| Average snowfall inches (cm) | 2.4 (6.1) | 3.03 (7.7) | 2.72 (6.9) | 2.28 (5.8) | 1.02 (2.6) | 0 (0) | 0 (0) | 0 (0) | 0 (0) | 2.48 (6.3) | 3.15 (8.0) | 2.64 (6.7) | 19.72 (50.1) |
| Average rainy days (≥ 0.1) | 2.3 | 2.3 | 6.1 | 10.4 | 12.8 | 12.9 | 11.6 | 11.2 | 8.2 | 6.8 | 2.6 | 3.3 | 90.5 |
| Average snowy days | 9.5 | 11.9 | 7.5 | 5 | 1 | 0 | 0 | 0 | 0 | 3.4 | 7.8 | 10.5 | 56.6 |
| Average relative humidity (%) | 87 | 84 | 77 | 64 | 61 | 62 | 54 | 51 | 52 | 61 | 69 | 84 | 67 |
| Mean daily sunshine hours | 4.4 | 4.4 | 6 | 8.5 | 9.6 | 10.8 | 11.5 | 11.3 | 9.8 | 6.4 | 5.6 | 4.5 | 7.7 |
| Mean daily daylight hours | 9 | 10.4 | 12 | 13.6 | 15.1 | 15.8 | 15.4 | 14.1 | 12.5 | 10.9 | 9.4 | 8.6 | 12.2 |
| Average ultraviolet index | 2 | 2 | 3 | 3 | 4 | 5 | 6 | 6 | 4 | 2 | 2 | 2 | 3 |
Source: Weather Atlas

== Demographics ==
Historical population
| Census | Pop. | Note | %± |
|---|---|---|---|
| 1920 | 526 | | — |
| 1930 | 653 | | 24.1% |
| 1940 | 870 | | 33.2% |
| 1950 | 1,051 | | 20.8% |
| 1960 | 1,064 | | 1.2% |
| 1970 | 1,130 | | 6.2% |
| 1980 | 1,274 | | 12.7% |
| 1990 | 887 | | −30.4% |
| 2000 | 866 | | −2.4% |
| 2010 | 800 | | −7.6% |
| 2020 | 996 | | 24.5% |
| 2024 (est.) | 992 | | −0.4% |
U.S. Decennial Census; 2020 Census

=== 2010 census ===
As of the 2010 census, there were 800 people, 360 households, and 225 families residing in the city. The population density was 740.7 inhabitants per square mile (286.0/km^{2}). There were 418 housing units at an average density of 387.0 per square mile (149.4/km^{2}). The racial makeup of the city was 97.3% White, 0.9% Native American, 0.9% Asian, 0.6% from other races, and 0.4% from two or more races. Hispanic or Latino of any race were 1.9% of the population.

There were 360 households, of which 29.4% had children under the age of 18 living with them, 45.0% were married couples living together, 12.2% had a female householder with no husband present, 5.3% had a male householder with no wife present, and 37.5% were non-families. 32.2% of all households were made up of individuals, and 10% had someone living alone who was 65 years of age or older. The average household size was 2.22 and the average family size was 2.78.

The median age in the city was 42.4 years. 22.2% of residents were under the age of 18; 8.1% were between the ages of 18 and 24; 23.9% were from 25 to 44; 29.7% were from 45 to 64; and 16.4% were 65 years of age or older. The gender makeup of the city was 50.8% male and 49.3% female.

=== 2000 census ===
As of the 2000 census, there were 866 people, 355 households, and 235 families residing in the city. The population density was 799.8 inhabitants per square mile (308.8/km^{2}). There were 439 housing units at an average density of 405.4 per square mile (156.5/km^{2}). The racial makeup of the city was 97.69% White, 0.23% African American, 0.23% Native American, 0.23% Asian, and 1.62% from two or more races. Hispanic or Latino of any race were 1.39% of the population. The top two ancestry groups in the city were German (57.1%) and Ukrainian (17.0%) of the population.

There were 355 households, out of which 34.1% had children under the age of 18 living with them, 52.1% were married couples living together, 9.9% had a female householder with no husband present, and 33.8% were non-families. 31.8% of all households were made up of individuals, and 14.1% had someone living alone who was 65 years of age or older. The average household size was 2.44 and the average family size was 3.09.

In the city, the population was spread out, with 27.6% under the age of 18, 6.5% from 18 to 24, 28.6% from 25 to 44, 20.6% from 45 to 64, and 16.7% who were 65 years of age or older. The median age was 38 years. For every 100 females, there were 104.2 males. For every 100 females age 18 and over, there were 95.3 males.

The median income for a household in the city was $27,619, and the median income for a family was $31,167. Males had a median income of $26,146 versus $14,609 for females. The per capita income for the city was $12,478. About 16.7% of families and 18.6% of the population were below the poverty line, including 24.5% of those under age 18 and 10.3% of those age 65 or over.

== Economy ==
1st National Bank, Dakota Ceramics, Main Street, Belfield, 1987

Belfield is located at the junction of two major thoroughfares: I-94 and U.S. Route 85. It is becoming greatly affected by the thriving oil activity in the area.
