= Richardton, North Dakota =

- City
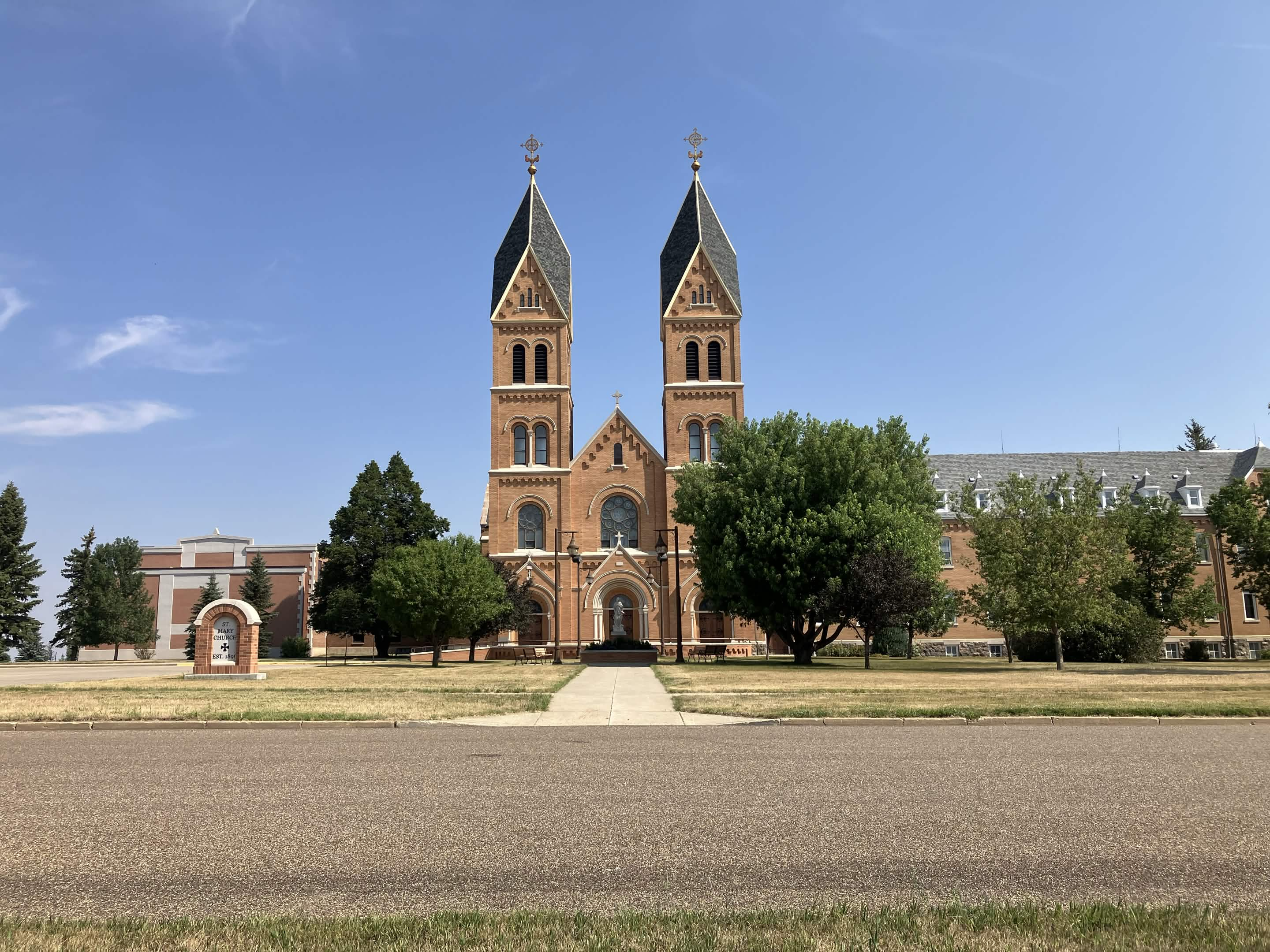
- Assumption Abbey Catholic Monastery

- Location of Richardton, North Dakota
- Coordinates: 46°53′03″N 102°19′59″W
- Country: United States
- State: North Dakota
- County: Stark
- Founded: 1883

Government
  - Mayor: Jesse Aman

Area
  - Total: 1.37 sq mi (3.54 km^{2})
  - Land: 1.37 sq mi (3.54 km^{2})
  - Water: 0 sq mi (0.00 km^{2})
- Elevation: 2,467 ft (752 m)

Population (2020)
  - Total: 692
  - Estimate (2022): 669
  - Density: 506.0/sq mi (195.38/km^{2})
- Time zone: UTC-7 (Mountain (MST))
  - Summer (DST): UTC-6 (MDT)
- ZIP code: 58652
- Area code: 701
- FIPS code: 38-66500
- GNIS feature ID: 1036238
- Website: www.cityofrichardtonnd.com

Richardton is a city in Stark County, North Dakota, United States. The population was 692 at the 2020 census. Richardton was founded in 1883. It is part of the Dickinson Micropolitan Statistical Area.

Richardton is home to Assumption Abbey, a Benedictine abbey.

A meteorite that landed near Richardton was named for it.

== Geography ==
According to the United States Census Bureau, the city has a total area of 0.36 square miles (0.93 km^{2}), all land.

== Demographics ==
Historical population
Census	Pop.	Note	%±
1910	647		—
1920	626		−3.2%
1930	710		13.4%
1940	682		−3.9%
1950	721		5.7%
1960	792		9.8%
1970	799		0.9%
1980	699		−12.5%
1990	625		−10.6%
2000	619		−1.0%
2010	529		−14.5%
2020	692		30.8%
2022 (est.)	669		−3.3%
U.S. Decennial Census; 2020 Census

=== 2010 census ===
As of the census of 2010, there were 529 people, 247 households, and 153 families residing in the city. The population density was 1,469.4 inhabitants per square mile (567.3/km^{2}). There were 285 housing units at an average density of 791.7 per square mile (305.7/km^{2}). The racial makeup of the city was 98.3% White, 0.8% Native American, 0.2% Asian, 0.6% from other races, and 0.2% from two or more races. Hispanic or Latino of any race were 2.3% of the population.

There were 247 households, of which 23.5% had children under the age of 18 living with them, 52.6% were married couples living together, 6.1% had a female householder with no husband present, 3.2% had a male householder with no wife present, and 38.1% were non-families. 34.4% of all households were made up of individuals, and 15% had someone living alone who was 65 years of age or older. The average household size was 2.14 and the average family size was 2.73.

The median age in the city was 45.9 years. 19.5% of residents were under the age of 18; 8.7% were between the ages of 18 and 24; 21% were from 25 to 44; 32.6% were from 45 to 64; and 18.3% were 65 years of age or older. The gender makeup of the city was 50.1% male and 49.9% female.

=== 2000 census ===
As of the census of 2000, there were 619 people, 251 households, and 168 families residing in the city. The population density was 1,686.7 inhabitants per square mile (651.2/km^{2}). There were 285 housing units at an average density of 776.6 per square mile (299.8/km^{2}). The racial makeup of the city was 99.35% White, 0.16% African American, 0.16% Native American, 0.16% Asian, and 0.16% from two or more races. Hispanic or Latino of any race were 0.32% of the population.

There were 251 households, out of which 28.7% had children under the age of 18 living with them, 61.0% were married couples living together, 3.6% had a female householder with no husband present, and 32.7% were non-families. 29.1% of all households were made up of individuals, and 15.9% had someone living alone who was 65 years of age or older. The average household size was 2.41 and the average family size was 3.00.

In the city, the population was spread out, with 25.0% under the age of 18, 6.6% from 18 to 24, 21.8% from 25 to 44, 23.7% from 45 to 64, and 22.8% who were 65 years of age or older. The median age was 43 years. For every 100 females, there were 97.8 males. For every 100 females age 18 and over, there were 96.6 males.

The median income for a household in the city was $32,917, and the median income for a family was $38,409. Males had a median income of $29,318 versus $18,750 for females. The per capita income for the city was $14,867. About 6.0% of families and 10.0% of the population were below the poverty line, including 3.7% of those under age 18 and 24.6% of those age 65 or over.

== Education ==
It is in the Richardton-Taylor Public School District.

== Climate ==
This climatic region is typified by large seasonal temperature differences, with warm to hot (and often humid) summers and cold (sometimes severely cold) winters. According to the Köppen Climate Classification system, Richardton has a humid continental climate, abbreviated "Dfb" on climate maps.

Climate data for Richardton, North Dakota (1991–2020 normals, extremes 1916–present)
Month	Jan	Feb	Mar	Apr	May	Jun	Jul	Aug	Sep	Oct	Nov	Dec	Year
Record high °F (°C)	61 (16)	66 (19)	93 (34)	93 (34)	103 (39)	106 (41)	113 (45)	106 (41)	104 (40)	95 (35)	78 (26)	64 (18)	113 (45)
Mean daily maximum °F (°C)	24.0 (−4.4)	27.4 (−2.6)	40.0 (4.4)	53.8 (12.1)	66.1 (18.9)	75.4 (24.1)	82.8 (28.2)	82.2 (27.9)	71.8 (22.1)	55.0 (12.8)	39.1 (3.9)	27.7 (−2.4)	53.8 (12.1)
Daily mean °F (°C)	15.6 (−9.1)	18.8 (−7.3)	30.2 (−1.0)	42.5 (5.8)	54.6 (12.6)	64.1 (17.8)	70.6 (21.4)	69.6 (20.9)	59.7 (15.4)	44.7 (7.1)	30.3 (−0.9)	19.4 (−7.0)	43.3 (6.3)
Mean daily minimum °F (°C)	7.1 (−13.8)	10.3 (−12.1)	20.3 (−6.5)	31.2 (−0.4)	43.1 (6.2)	52.9 (11.6)	58.4 (14.7)	57.0 (13.9)	47.6 (8.7)	34.4 (1.3)	21.6 (−5.8)	11.2 (−11.6)	32.9 (0.5)
Record low °F (°C)	−43 (−42)	−48 (−44)	−27 (−33)	−8 (−22)	8 (−13)	30 (−1)	34 (1)	33 (1)	16 (−9)	−9 (−23)	−28 (−33)	−36 (−38)	−48 (−44)
Average precipitation inches (mm)	0.37 (9.4)	0.38 (9.7)	0.67 (17)	1.30 (33)	2.44 (62)	3.10 (79)	2.18 (55)	1.74 (44)	1.73 (44)	1.46 (37)	0.50 (13)	0.46 (12)	16.33 (415)
Average snowfall inches (cm)	4.5 (11)	4.5 (11)	7.3 (19)	3.2 (8.1)	0.8 (2.0)	0.0 (0.0)	0.0 (0.0)	0.0 (0.0)	0.2 (0.51)	2.6 (6.6)	4.9 (12)	5.4 (14)	33.2 (84)
Average precipitation days (≥ 0.01 in)	3.9	3.4	4.6	5.8	8.4	10.5	7.4	5.7	5.5	5.1	3.9	3.9	68.1
Average snowy days (≥ 0.1 in)	3.8	3.2	3.6	1.5	0.4	0.0	0.0	0.0	0.0	1.0	3.2	3.6	20.3
Source: NOAA
