= Richardton-Taylor Public School District =

School district in North Dakota, United States

Address
- 320 Raider Road Richardton, North Dakota, 58652; United States

District information
- Type: Public
- Grades: PreK–12
- NCES District ID: 3800048

Students and staff
- Students: 339
- Teachers: 27.95
- Staff: 25.89
- Student–teacher ratio: 12.13

Other information
- Website: www.richardton-taylor.k12.nd.us

Richardton-Taylor Public School District No. 34 is a school district headquartered in Richardton, North Dakota, United States. It operates Taylor-Richardton Elementary School in Taylor and Richardton-Taylor High School in Richardton.

It is mostly in Stark County, where it serves Richardton and Taylor. A portion is in Dunn County.

== History ==
The Richardton school building opened in 1961.

In April 2007 the school board chose Brent Bautz, previously of the Bisbee-Egeland School District, as the superintendent of Richardton-Taylor. In 2007 the elementary school had 120 students and the secondary school had 115 students.

In 2009 the district had 240 students, and the population had declined for some time. By 2013 the student population was up to 273. That year, Lauren Donovan stated the building maintenance issues in the Richardton campus were "deep and severe".

In 2016 the school district had 300 students. In 2016, it began having a separate property for pre-Kindergarten through grade 1 on leased property at St. Mary's Social Center. There was a plan for a $15 million renovation of the secondary school in Richardton.
