= Richardton meteorite =

Meteorite found in North Dakota, United States

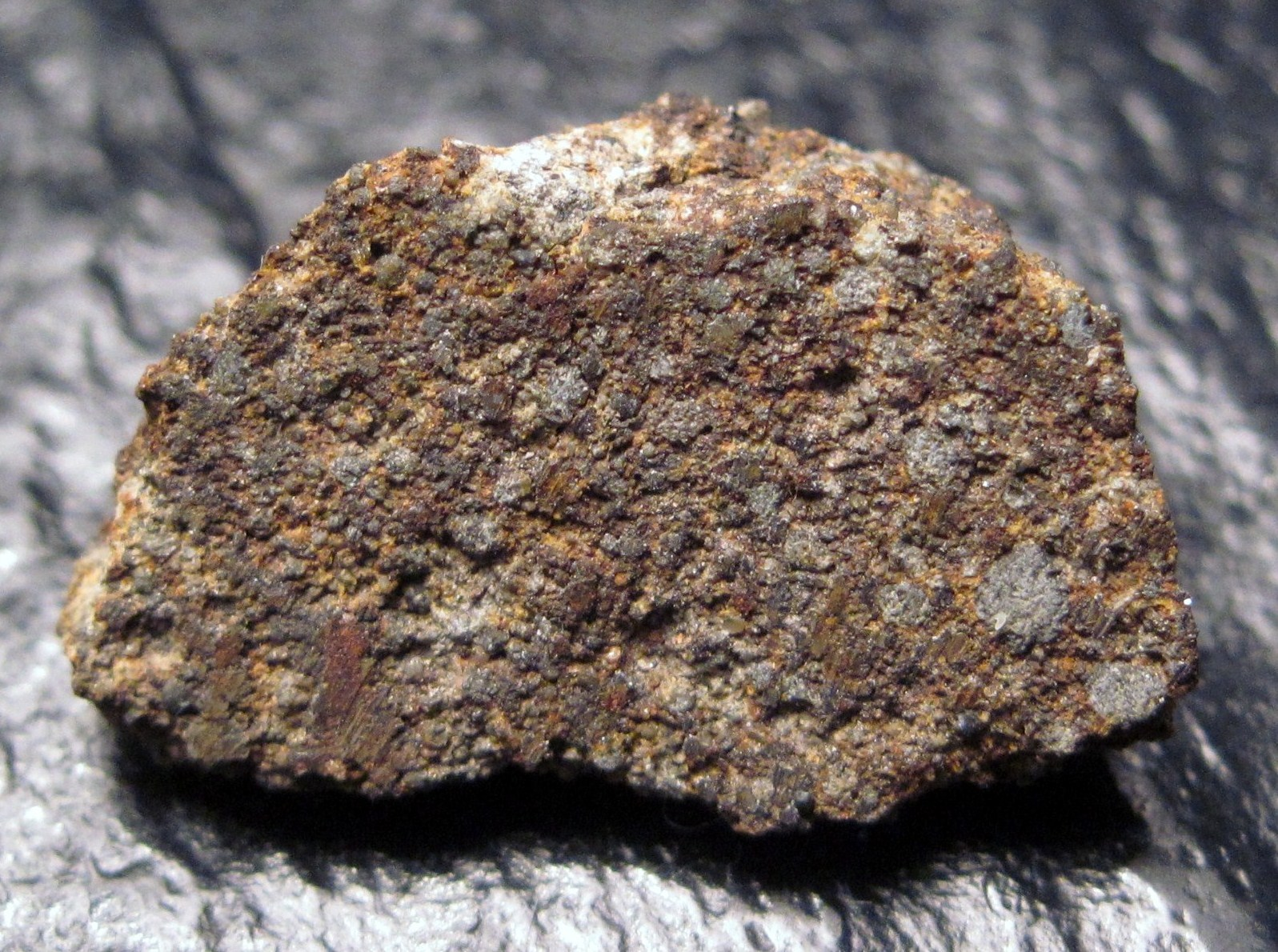
- Type: Chondrite
- Class: Ordinary chondrite
- Group: H5
- Country: United States
- Region: Richardton, North Dakota
- Coordinates: 46°37′30″N 102°16′17″W
- Observed fall: Yes
- Fall date: 1918-06-30
- TKW: 90 kilograms (200 lb)
- Strewn field: Yes
- Related media on Wikimedia Commons

The Richardton meteorite is a 90 kilograms (200 lb) H5 Ordinary chondrite that was seen to fall at 21:48 on 30 June 1918 between Mott, North Dakota and Richardton, North Dakota, United States.

Pieces were found in a strewn field of about 9 miles (14 km) by 5 miles (8.0 km) centred on 46°37′30″N 102°16′17″W and oriented north–south. As of December 2012 pieces of this meteorite were for sale online at up to US$80/g.

In 1960 John Reynolds discovered that the Richardton meteorite had an excess of ^{129}Xe, a result of the presence of ^{129}I in the solar nebula.

== See also ==
- Glossary of meteoritics
