= Taylor, North Dakota =

- City
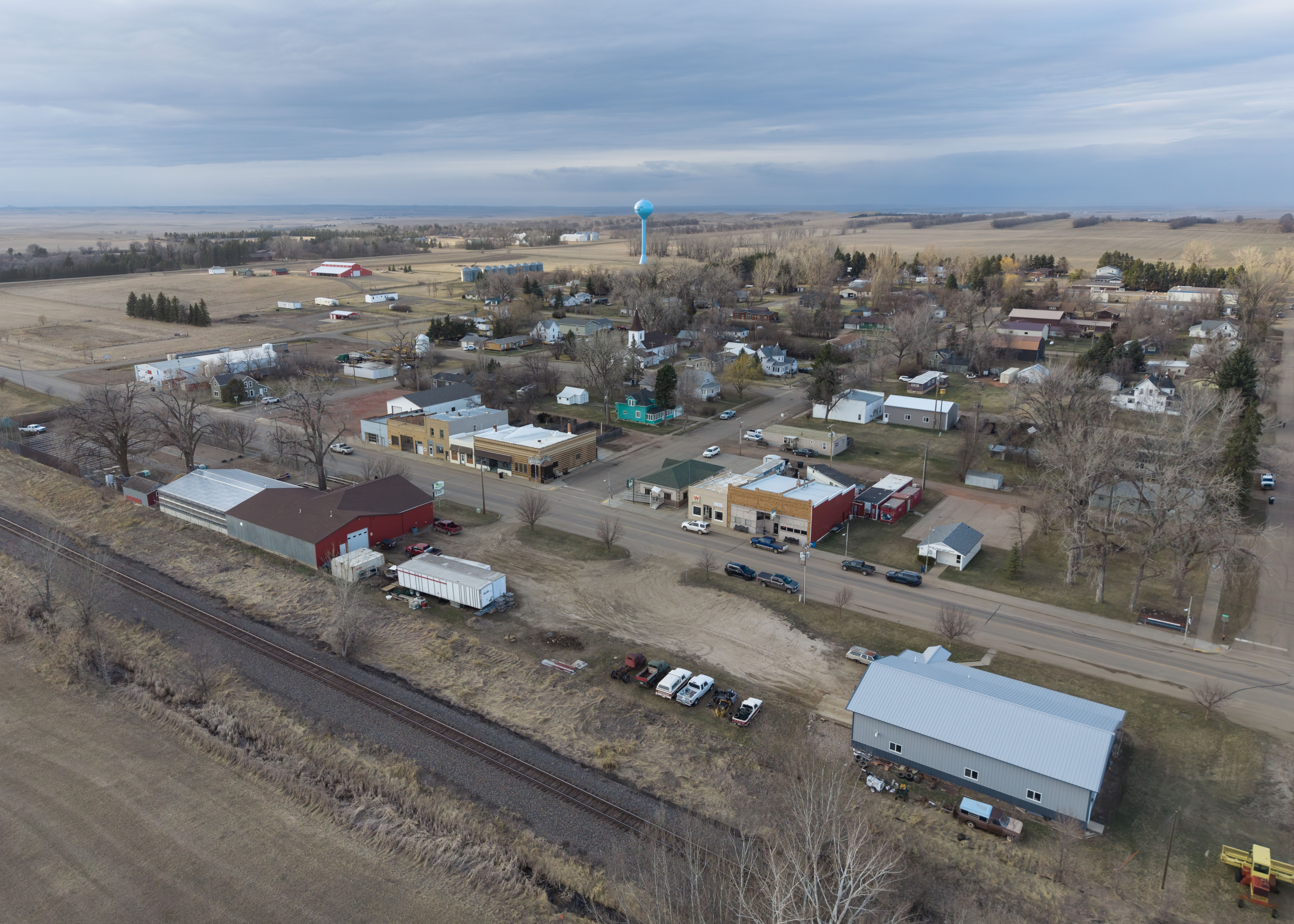
- Taylor (2026)

- Logo

- Location of Taylor, North Dakota
- Coordinates: 46°54′06″N 102°25′20″W
- Country: United States
- State: North Dakota
- County: Stark
- Founded: 1882

Area
  - Total: 0.51 sq mi (1.31 km^{2})
  - Land: 0.50 sq mi (1.30 km^{2})
  - Water: 0.0039 sq mi (0.01 km^{2})
- Elevation: 2,503 ft (763 m)

Population (2020)
  - Total: 230
  - Estimate (2022): 222
  - Density: 459.1/sq mi (177.26/km^{2})
- Time zone: UTC-7 (Mountain (MST))
  - Summer (DST): UTC-6 (MDT)
- ZIP code: 58656
- Area code: 701
- FIPS code: 38-78180
- GNIS feature ID: 1036293
- Website: cityoftaylornd.net

Taylor is a city in Stark County, North Dakota, United States. The population was 230 at the 2020 census. It is part of the Dickinson Micropolitan Statistical Area.

== History ==
Taylor was founded in 1882 along the transcontinental rail line of the Northern Pacific Railway. The name comes from David R. Taylor, a railroad official in Mandan and later the founder of a drugstore there.

== Geography ==
According to the United States Census Bureau, the city has a total area of 0.51 square miles (1.32 km^{2}), of which 0.50 square miles (1.29 km^{2}) is land and 0.01 square miles (0.03 km^{2}) is water.

== Demographics ==
Historical population
Census	Pop.	Note	%±
1920	285		—
1930	263		−7.7%
1940	251		−4.6%
1950	258		2.8%
1960	215		−16.7%
1970	162		−24.7%
1980	239		47.5%
1990	163		−31.8%
2000	150		−8.0%
2010	148		−1.3%
2020	230		55.4%
2022 (est.)	222		−3.5%
U.S. Decennial Census; 2020 Census

=== 2010 census ===
As of the census of 2010, there were 148 people, 75 households and 44 families residing in the city. The population density was 296.0 inhabitants per square mile (114.3/km^{2}). There were 96 housing units at an average density of 192.0 per square mile (74.1/km^{2}). The racial makeup of the city was 98.6% White, 0.7% Native American, and 0.7% from other races. Hispanic or Latino of any race were 0.7% of the population.

There were 75 households, of which 18.7% had children under the age of 18 living with them, 49.3% were married couples living together, 6.7% had a female householder with no husband present, 2.7% had a male householder with no wife present, and 41.3% were non-families. 38.7% of all households were made up of individuals, and 25.4% had someone living alone who was 65 years of age or older. The average household size was 1.97 and the average family size was 2.61.

The median age in the city was 50.2 years. 17.6% of residents were under the age of 18; 6% were between the ages of 18 and 24; 20.4% were from 25 to 44; 29.7% were from 45 to 64; and 26.4% were 65 years of age or older. The gender makeup of the city was 48.0% male and 52.0% female.

=== 2000 census ===
As of the census of 2000, there were 150 people, 65 households, and 44 families residing in the city. The population density was 301.5 inhabitants per square mile (116.4/km^{2}). There were 83 housing units at an average density of 166.8 per square mile (64.4/km^{2}). The racial makeup of the city was 100.00% White.

There were 65 households, of which 23.1% had children under the age of 18 living with them, 53.8% were married couples living together, 9.2% had a female householder with no husband present, and 32.3% were non-families. 30.8% of all households were made up of individuals, and 15.4% had someone living alone who was 65 years of age or older. The average household size was 2.31, and the average family size was 2.86.

22.0% of the population were under the age of 18, 6.7% from 18 to 24, 19.3% from 25 to 44, 29.3% from 45 to 64, and 22.7% who were 65 years of age or older. The median age was 46 years. For every 100 females, there were 80.7 males. For every 100 females age 18 and over, there were 80.0 males.

The median household income was $28,958, and the median family income was $30,750. Males had a median income of $17,500 compared with $17,500 for females. The per capita income for the city was $13,846. There were no families and 9.4% of the population living below the poverty line, including no under eighteen and none of those over 64.

== Education ==
It is in the Richardton-Taylor School District.

== Climate ==
This climatic region is typified by large seasonal temperature differences, with warm to hot (and often humid) summers and cold (sometimes severely cold) winters. According to the Köppen Climate Classification system, Taylor has a humid continental climate, abbreviated "Dfb" on climate maps.
