= Zenith, North Dakota =

- Unincorporated community
- Location within North Dakota Location within the United States
- Coordinates: 46°52′46″N 103°05′48″W
- Country: United States
- State: North Dakota
- County: Stark
- Elevation: 2,513 ft (766 m)
- Time zone: UTC-7 (Mountain (MST))
  - Summer (DST): UTC-6 (MDT)
- Area code: 701
- GNIS feature ID: 1033930

Zenith is an unincorporated community in Stark County, North Dakota, United States.
