= South Heart, North Dakota =

- City
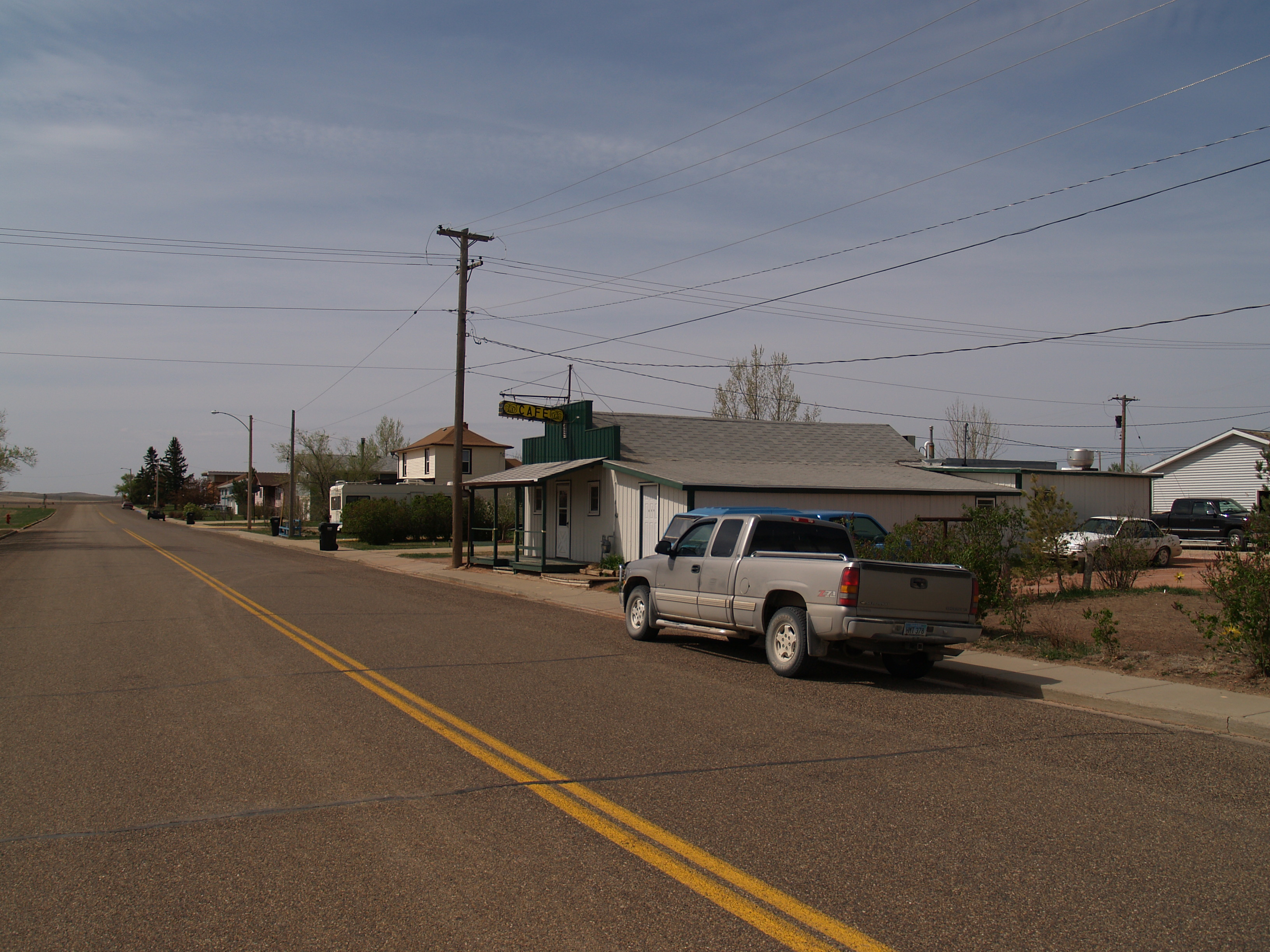

- Location of South Heart, North Dakota
- Coordinates: 46°52′05″N 102°59′31″W
- Country: United States
- State: North Dakota
- County: Stark
- Founded: 1908

Area
  - Total: 1.35 sq mi (3.50 km^{2})
  - Land: 1.35 sq mi (3.49 km^{2})
  - Water: 0.0039 sq mi (0.01 km^{2})
- Elevation: 2,503 ft (763 m)

Population (2020)
  - Total: 394
  - Estimate (2022): 398
  - Density: 292.4/sq mi (112.91/km^{2})
- Time zone: UTC-7 (Mountain (MST))
  - Summer (DST): UTC-6 (MDT)
- ZIP code: 58655
- Area code: 701
- FIPS code: 38-74185
- GNIS feature ID: 1036274
- Website: southheartnd.com

South Heart is a city in Stark County, North Dakota, United States. The population was 394 at the 2020 census. It is part of the Dickinson Micropolitan Statistical Area. South Heart was founded in 1908.

== History ==
The city lies on the south side of the Heart River, hence the name.

== Geography ==
According to the United States Census Bureau, the city has a total area of 0.96 square miles (2.49 km^{2}), of which 0.95 square miles (2.46 km^{2}) is land and 0.01 square miles (0.03 km^{2}) is water.

== Demographics ==
Historical population
Census	Pop.	Note	%±
1970	132		—
1980	294		122.7%
1990	322		9.5%
2000	307		−4.7%
2010	301		−2.0%
2020	394		30.9%
2022 (est.)	398		1.0%
U.S. Decennial Census; 2020 Census

=== 2010 census ===
As of the census of 2010, there were 301 people, 121 households, and 80 families residing in the city. The population density was 316.8 inhabitants per square mile (122.3/km^{2}). There were 129 housing units at an average density of 135.8 per square mile (52.4/km^{2}). The racial makeup of the city was 99.0% White and 1.0% from two or more races. Hispanic or Latino of any race were 0.7% of the population.

There were 121 households, of which 31.4% had children under the age of 18 living with them, 56.2% were married couples living together, 5.0% had a female householder with no husband present, 5.0% had a male householder with no wife present, and 33.9% were non-families. 28.1% of all households were made up of individuals, and 11.6% had someone living alone who was 65 years of age or older. The average household size was 2.49 and the average family size was 3.06.

The median age in the city was 37.1 years. 26.2% of residents were under the age of 18; 7.3% were between the ages of 18 and 24; 23.9% were from 25 to 44; 27.9% were from 45 to 64; and 14.6% were 65 years of age or older. The gender makeup of the city was 53.2% male and 46.8% female.

=== 2000 census ===
As of the census of 2000, there were 307 people, 108 households, and 81 families residing in the city. The population density was 327.7 inhabitants per square mile (126.5/km^{2}). There were 119 housing units at an average density of 127.0 per square mile (49.0/km^{2}). The racial makeup of the city was 98.70% White, 0.33% African American, and 0.98% from two or more races.

There were 108 households, out of which 41.7% had children under the age of 18 living with them, 66.7% were married couples living together, 7.4% had a female householder with no husband present, and 25.0% were non-families. 21.3% of all households were made up of individuals, and 6.5% had someone living alone who was 65 years of age or older. The average household size was 2.84 and the average family size was 3.40.

In the city, the population was spread out, with 34.5% under the age of 18, 4.6% from 18 to 24, 27.0% from 25 to 44, 23.8% from 45 to 64, and 10.1% who were 65 years of age or older. The median age was 35 years. For every 100 females, there were 106.0 males. For every 100 females age 18 and over, there were 97.1 males.

The median income for a household in the city was $35,750, and the median income for a family was $41,250. Males had a median income of $26,563 versus $18,750 for females. The per capita income for the city was $13,059. About 8.0% of families and 9.4% of the population were below the poverty line, including 7.9% of those under the age of eighteen and 18.2% of those 65 or over.

== Radio ==
- KDXN FM 105.7 Hot AC/Classic Hits
