= Stark County, North Dakota =

County in North Dakota, United States

- County
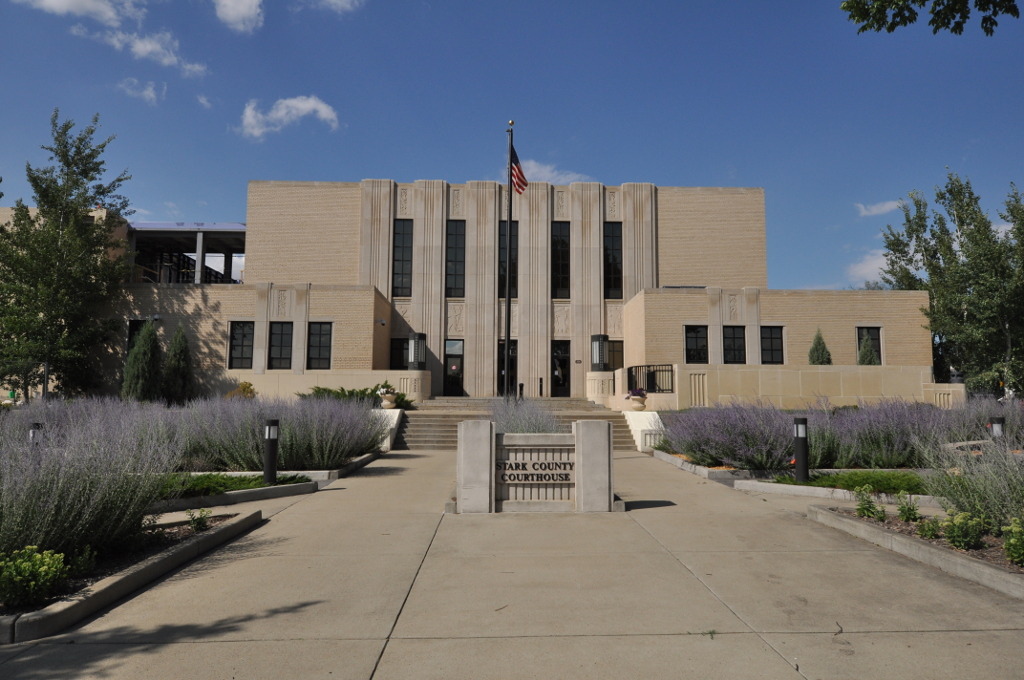
- The Stark County Courthouse in Dickinson

- Logo

- Location within the U.S. state of North Dakota
- Coordinates: 46.8170°N 102.6620°W
- Country: United States
- State: North Dakota
- Founded: February 10, 1879 (created); May 25, 1883 (organized)
- Named for: George Stark
- Seat: Dickinson
- Largest city: Dickinson

Area
  - Total: 1,340.328 sq mi (3,471.43 km^{2})
  - Land: 1,334.913 sq mi (3,457.41 km^{2})
  - Water: 5.415 sq mi (14.02 km^{2}) 0.40%

Population (2020)
  - Total: 33,646
  - Estimate (2025): 34,013 ▲
  - Density: 25.205/sq mi (9.7316/km^{2})
- Time zone: UTC−7 (Mountain)
  - Summer (DST): UTC−6 (MDT)
- Area code: 701
- Congressional district: At-large
- Website: starkcountynd.gov

Stark County is a county in the U.S. state of North Dakota. As of the 2020 census, the population was 33,646, and was estimated to be 34,013 in 2025, making it the 7th-most populous county in North Dakota. The county seat and the largest city is Dickinson.

Stark County is part of the Dickinson micropolitan area, which comprises all of Billings, Dunn, and Stark Counties.

== History ==
The Dakota Territory legislature created the county on February 10, 1879, taking area from now-extinct Howard and Williams counties and some previously unincorporated territory. It was named for George Stark, a vice president of the Northern Pacific Railroad. The county organization was not completed at that time, but the new county was not attached to another county for administrative and judicial purposes. The county lost a portion of its area when Hettinger County was created on March 9, 1883. On May 25, 1883, the Stark County organization was affected.

The county boundaries were altered in February and in March 1887. The county was slightly enlarged on January 18, 1908, by a small strip of land (due to a redefinition of county boundary lines), giving Stark County its present boundary lines.

== Geography ==
The south branch of the Heart River flows through the central part of Stark County, discharging into Patterson Lake at Dickinson, then flowing east-southeasterly into adjacent Morton County. The county terrain consists of semi-arid rolling hills, mostly devoted to agriculture. The terrain slopes to the east, with its highest point near its SW corner, at 2,831 ft (863 m) ASL.

According to the United States Census Bureau, the county has a total area of 1,340.328 square miles (3,471.43 km^{2}), of which 1,334.913 square miles (3,457.41 km^{2}) is land and 5.415 square miles (14.02 km^{2}) (0.40%) is water. It is the 21st largest county in North Dakota by total area.

The southwestern counties of North Dakota (Adams, Billings, Bowman, Golden Valley, Grant, Hettinger, Slope, Stark) observe Mountain Time. The counties of McKenzie, Dunn, and Sioux counties are split.

=== Major highways ===
- I-94
- US 85
- ND 8
- ND 22

=== Transit ===
- Dickinson Public Transit
- Jefferson Lines
- West River Transit

=== Adjacent counties ===
- Dunn County – north/Central Time in the north part of the county
- Mercer County – northeast/Central Time
- Morton County – east/Central Time
- Grant County – southeast/Central Time
- Hettinger County – south
- Slope County – southwest
- Billings County – west

=== Lakes ===
- Abbey Lake
- Patterson Lake

== Demographics ==
Historical population
Census	Pop.	Note	%±
1890	2,304		—
1900	7,621		230.8%
1910	12,504		64.1%
1920	13,542		8.3%
1930	15,340		13.3%
1940	15,414		0.5%
1950	16,137		4.7%
1960	18,451		14.3%
1970	19,613		6.3%
1980	23,697		20.8%
1990	22,832		−3.7%
2000	22,636		−0.9%
2010	24,199		6.9%
2020	33,646		39.0%
2025 (est.)	34,013	▲	1.1%
U.S. Decennial Census; 1790–1960 1900–1990; 1990–2000 2010–2020

As of the third quarter of 2025, the median home value in Stark County was $304,547.

As of the 2024 American Community Survey, there are 13,537 estimated households in Stark County with an average of 2.40 persons per household. The county has a median household income of $84,449. Approximately 12.1% of the county's population lives at or below the poverty line. Stark County has an estimated 67.1% employment rate, with 30.0% of the population holding a bachelor's degree or higher and 92.5% holding a high school diploma. There were 15,514 housing units at an average density of 11.62 per square mile (4.5/km^{2}).

The top five reported languages (people were allowed to report up to two languages, thus the figures will generally add to more than 100%) were English (92.0%), Spanish (4.0%), Indo-European (1.7%), Asian and Pacific Islander (1.3%), and Other (1.0%).

The median age in the county was 34.8 years.

Stark County, North Dakota – racial and ethnic composition Note: the US Census treats Hispanic/Latino as an ethnic category. This table excludes Latinos from the racial categories and assigns them to a separate category. Hispanics/Latinos may be of any race.
Race / ethnicity (NH = non-Hispanic)	Pop. 1980	Pop. 1990	Pop. 2000	Pop. 2010	Pop. 2020	Pop. 2024
White alone (NH)	23,390 (98.70%)	22,471 (98.42%)	21,922 (96.85%)	22,765 (94.07%)	28,307 (84.13%)	28,323 (83.88%)
Black or African American alone (NH)	13 (0.05%)	17 (0.07%)	47 (0.21%)	186 (0.77%)	1,033 (3.07%)	830 (2.46%)
Native American or Alaska Native alone (NH)	135 (0.57%)	138 (0.60%)	203 (0.90%)	230 (%)	392 (1.17%)	505 (1.50%)
Asian alone (NH)	46 (0.19%)	77 (0.34%)	50 (0.22%)	288 (1.19%)	344 (1.02%)	674 (2.00%)
Pacific Islander alone (NH)	—	—	5 (0.02%)	7 (0.03%)	51 (0.15%)	44 (0.13%)
Other race alone (NH)	31 (0.13%)	3 (0.01%)	9 (0.04%)	15 (0.06%)	88 (0.26%)	—
Mixed race or multiracial (NH)	—	—	164 (0.72%)	254 (1.05%)	1,157 (3.44%)	681 (2.02%)
Hispanic or Latino (any race)	82 (0.35%)	126 (0.55%)	236 (1.04%)	454 (1.88%)	2,274 (6.76%)	2,710 (8.03%)
Total	23,697 (100.00%)	22,832 (100.00%)	22,636 (100.00%)	24,199 (100.00%)	33,646 (100.00%)	33,767 (100.00%)

=== 2024 estimate ===
As of the 2024 estimate, there were 33,767 people, 13,537 households, and _ families residing in the county. The population density was 25.30 inhabitants per square mile (9.8/km^{2}). There were 15,514 housing units at an average density of 11.62 per square mile (4.5/km^{2}). The racial makeup of the county was 90.41% White, 2.79% African American, 2.21% Native American, 2.04% Asian, 0.17% Pacific Islander, _% from some other races and 2.38% from two or more races. Hispanic or Latino people of any race were 8.03% of the population.

=== 2020 census ===
As of the 2020 census, there were 33,646 people, 13,561 households, and 8,394 families residing in the county. The population density was 25.20 inhabitants per square mile (9.7/km^{2}). There were 15,381 housing units at an average density of 11.52 per square mile (4.4/km^{2}). The racial makeup of the county was 85.97% White, 3.12% African American, 1.39% Native American, 1.06% Asian, 0.17% Pacific Islander, 2.76% from some other races and 5.54% from two or more races. Hispanic or Latino people of any race were 6.76% of the population.

There were 13,561 households in the county, of which 32.0% had children under the age of 18 living with them and 20.4% had a female householder with no spouse or partner present. About 30.6% of all households were made up of individuals and 8.7% had someone living alone who was 65 years of age or older.

Of the residents, 25.8% were under the age of 18 and 13.1% were 65 years of age or older; the median age was 34.1 years. For every 100 females there were 107.7 males, and for every 100 females age 18 and over there were 107.5 males. Among occupied housing units, 61.7% were owner-occupied and 38.3% were renter-occupied. The homeowner vacancy rate was 1.8% and the rental vacancy rate was 15.5%.

=== 2010 census ===
As of the 2010 census, there were 24,199 people, 10,085 households, and 6,167 families in the county. The population density was 18.13 inhabitants per square mile (7.0/km^{2}). There were 10,735 housing units at an average density of 8.04 per square mile (3.1/km^{2}). The racial makeup of the county was 95.15% White, 0.81% African American, 0.99% Native American, 1.21% Asian, 0.04% Pacific Islander, 0.52% from some other races and 1.28% from two or more races. Hispanic or Latino people of any race were 1.88% of the population.

In terms of ancestry, 59.0% were German, 14.7% were Norwegian, 7.7% were Russian, 7.7% were Irish, 7.3% were Czech, 5.4% were English, and 3.5% were American.

There were 10,085 households, 27.3% had children under the age of 18 living with them, 49.8% were married couples living together, 7.4% had a female householder with no husband present, 38.8% were non-families, and 30.9% of all households were made up of individuals. The average household size was 2.31 and the average family size was 2.90. The median age was 38.3 years.

The median income for a household in the county was $49,536 and the median income for a family was $62,560. Males had a median income of $42,338 versus $26,451 for females. The per capita income for the county was $25,282. About 5.9% of families and 10.0% of the population were below the poverty line, including 12.9% of those under age 18 and 13.1% of those age 65 or over.

== Communities ==
=== Cities ===
- Belfield
- Dickinson (county seat)
- Gladstone
- Richardton
- South Heart
- Taylor

=== Unincorporated communities ===
- Antelope
- Daglum
- Lefor
- Schefield
- Zenith

=== Unorganized Territories ===
There are no townships in Stark County, but the United States Census Bureau divides the county into four unorganized territories:

- Dickinson North, the northern part of the county outside Dickinson, had a population of 3,326 at the 2020 Census.
- Dickinson South, the southern part of the county, had a population of 577 at the 2020 Census.
- East Stark, the eastern part of the county outside Gladstone, Taylor, and Richardton, had a population of 849 at the 2020 Census.
- West Stark, the western part of the county outside Belfield and South Heart, had a population of 632 at the 2020 Census.

== Politics ==
Stark County voters have tended to vote Republican for decades. In no national election since 1964 has the county selected the Democratic Party candidate (as of 2024). Despite its rapid population growth due to a massive oil boom, Stark County has swung right faster than almost any county, with oil-friendly Republican candidate Donald Trump collapsing Democratic support in 2016 by almost 10% and increasing Republican margins to 79%, the highest since Eisenhower in 1952. While Joe Biden managed to stop a three-election slide in percentage in 2020, Trump further increased his percentage to 80%, the highest since 1920.

United States presidential election results for Stark County, North Dakota
Year	Republican		Democratic		Third party(ies)	
Year	No.	%	No.	%	No.	%
1900	780	64.20%	426	35.06%	9	0.74%
1904	703	73.92%	231	24.29%	17	1.79%
1908	922	63.76%	496	34.30%	28	1.94%
1912	387	22.40%	678	39.24%	663	38.37%
1916	1,409	58.10%	953	39.30%	63	2.60%
1920	3,526	86.23%	532	13.01%	31	0.76%
1924	2,130	50.58%	266	6.32%	1,815	43.10%
1928	1,924	37.28%	3,231	62.60%	6	0.12%
1932	1,443	23.17%	4,786	76.83%	0	0.00%
1936	1,602	26.10%	4,012	65.35%	525	8.55%
1940	4,367	67.63%	2,075	32.14%	15	0.23%
1944	2,852	64.85%	1,534	34.88%	12	0.27%
1948	3,222	60.15%	2,017	37.65%	118	2.20%
1952	5,322	79.58%	1,332	19.92%	34	0.51%
1956	4,251	70.38%	1,778	29.44%	11	0.18%
1960	3,223	43.43%	4,197	56.56%	1	0.01%
1964	2,888	40.33%	4,270	59.63%	3	0.04%
1968	4,365	58.64%	2,577	34.62%	502	6.74%
1972	5,115	62.91%	2,636	32.42%	380	4.67%
1976	4,374	49.93%	4,076	46.53%	310	3.54%
1980	6,312	70.11%	2,016	22.39%	675	7.50%
1984	7,641	71.15%	2,759	25.69%	340	3.17%
1988	6,137	61.35%	3,678	36.77%	188	1.88%
1992	4,491	42.06%	3,003	28.12%	3,184	29.82%
1996	4,086	46.94%	3,095	35.55%	1,524	17.51%
2000	6,387	65.33%	2,784	28.47%	606	6.20%
2004	7,220	69.42%	3,013	28.97%	167	1.61%
2008	7,024	63.13%	3,802	34.17%	301	2.71%
2012	8,521	73.25%	2,812	24.17%	300	2.58%
2016	9,755	79.17%	1,753	14.23%	814	6.61%
2020	12,110	80.47%	2,499	16.60%	441	2.93%
2024	12,323	81.61%	2,473	16.38%	304	2.01%

== Education ==
School districts include:

- Belfield Public School, District 13, Belfield
- Dickinson Public Schools, District 1, Dickinson
- Hebron Public School, District 13, Hebron
- Mott/Regent Public School, District 1, Mott
- New England Public Schools, District 9, New England
- Richardton-Taylor Public School, District 34, Richardton
- South Heart Public School, District 9, South Heart

== See also ==
- National Register of Historic Places listings in Stark County, North Dakota
