= Dickinson High School (Dickinson, North Dakota) =

Coordinates: 46°53′23″N 102°48′23″W

Location
- 979 13th Avenue West; Dickinson, North Dakota 58601; United States

Information
- Type: Public high school
- Established: 1909
- Oversight: Dickinson Public Schools
- Principal: Jeff Brandt
- Teaching staff: 60.49 (FTE)
- Grades: 9-12
- Enrollment: 1,060 (2023–2024)
- Student to teacher ratio: 17.52
- Colors: Orange and black
- Mascot: The Mavericks
- Yearbook: Dic Dak
- Website: www.dickinson.k12.nd.us/schools/dhs/index

Dickinson High School is a public high school located in Dickinson, North Dakota. It currently serves about 1,060 students and is a part of the Dickinson Public Schools system. The official school colors are orange and black and the athletic teams are now known as the Mavericks (though formerly and still commonly known as the Midgets).

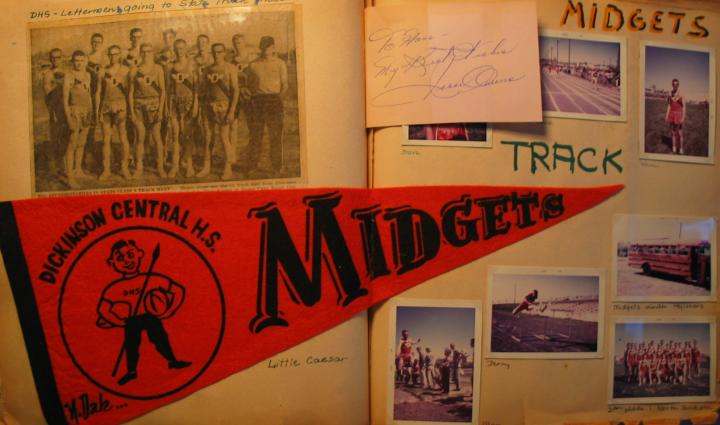
A Midgets fan page of '64

DHS educates an average of 1,000 students in grades nine through twelve each year, and employs 60 certified teachers and 35 classified staff members. DHS offers 328 different courses in a variety of subjects, as well as Advanced Placement courses and college dual-credit courses.

== History ==
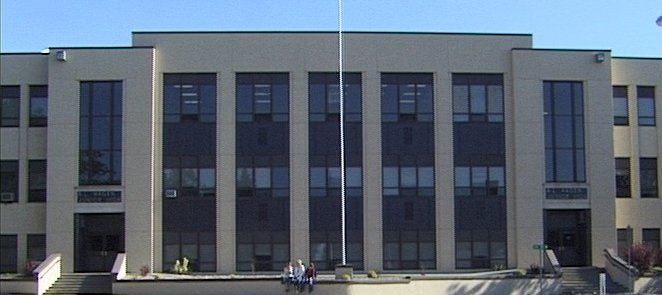
Photograph of former A.L. Hagen Junior High, also the former location of Dickinson High School

In 1909 the community built Central High School, a two-story structure of 12 classrooms. The first floor contained the library and assembly hall, and the basement served as the gym. Central High possessed the latest in technological marvels when electric lights were installed in 1910. The school stood on the southwest corner of the school block where P.S. Berg Elementary stands today.

By the mid-1930s Dickinson's schools suffered from overcrowding. The school board felt it was time to build a new high school, but, despite information presented to the public, the city voted against the $100,000 bond issue necessary for construction. However, the school board applied for assistance from the Public Works Administration to build the high school and adjoining athletic field. Additions were made to this new Central High School in 1950. Central High School became increasingly more crowded and as the Model High at Dickinson State College closed in 1963, the need for a new high school was evident. The State Department of Vocational Education agreed to help with construction.

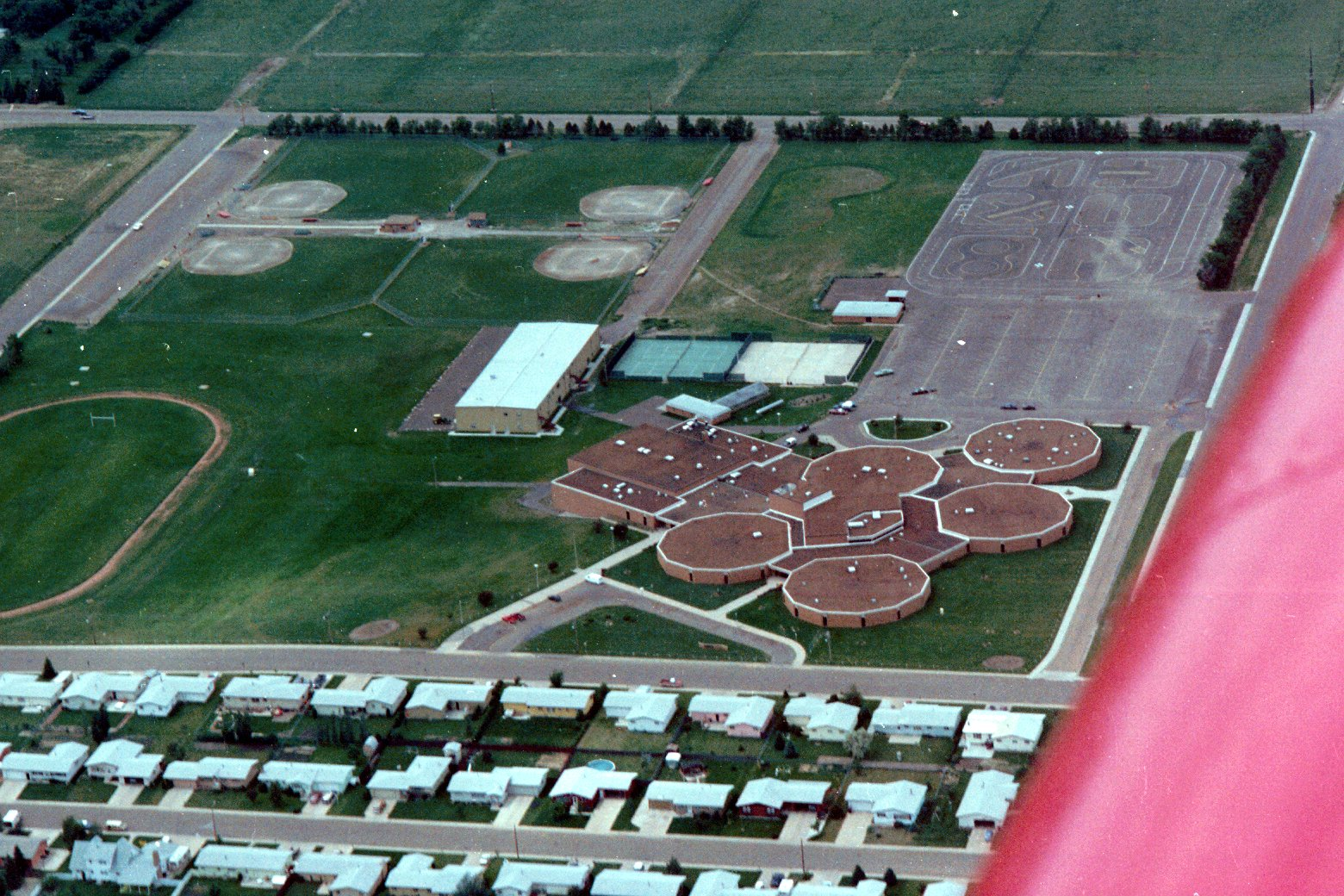
Aerial photo of the new High School in Dickinson, ND

In March 1966, voters approved the $1,525,000 bond issue for construction. The new high school, Dickinson High School, was designated as one of the two area vocational high schools in North Dakota. Several outbuildings and a new auditorium were added over the years.

The 1981–1982 school year saw the largest student enrollment in the district's history, with 1,041 students in the high school. The former Central High became A.L. Hagen Junior High in 1968, when the new Dickinson High School was built on Empire Road north of town.

In 1994, Dickinson adopted the block scheduling system, in which students attend only four courses a day, each 90 minutes long, enabling them to earn more class credits than in other schools (which traditionally mandate seven courses per day). They have recently added the "opportunity period," which allows a 30-minute period for lunch. In this time the students can work on homework, tests, or whatever the teacher assigns. This takes place three days a week and freshmen are required to attend. If the other classes do not need the extra help, they get an extended lunch.

The school is currently undergoing an expansion and renovation. The new addition will open in early 2027.

== Activities and athletics ==
=== Championships ===
- State Class 'A' speech: 2016
- State Class 'AAA' football: 1997
- State Class 'A' volleyball: 2005, 2006
- State Class 'A' boys basketball: 2003, 2007
- State Class 'A' baseball: 2001, 2004, 2007, 2009, 2016
- State Class 'A' boys' track and field: 1941, 1959, 1960, 1962, 1981, 1982, 1989, 1990, 1997, 1998, 1999
- State Class 'A' girls' track and field: 1975, 1976, 1977, 1980, 1990
- State Class 'A' boys' cross country: 1986, 2000
- State Class 'A' girls' cross country: 2000, 2001, 2002, 2003, 2004
- State gymnastics: 1974, 1975, 1976, 1987, 1988, 2007, 2008, 2013, 2014, 2016, 2017, 2018, 2019, 2020, 2021, 2022, 2023, 2024, 2025
- State Class 'A' dance team
- Jazz: 2009
- Hip Hop: 2009
- State Science Bowl: 2008, 2009
- State Class 'A' Girls Softball: 2021, 2023

=== Mascot controversy ===
The Midget (former mascot)

There was controversy surrounding Dickinson's former mascot, the Midget. According to The Dickinson Press, there are four prevailing theories about the origins of the name but no reliable records. In 1996, the school board voted to change the mascot, but residents recalled three of the board members. In 2010, the school board's president, Dean Rummel, brought up the issue again, but the board decided not to address it. In 2019, the Little People of America (LPA) came to Dickinson to request again that the school consider changing the mascot. The school board directed the school district administration to collect feedback from the community about the change. A resulting survey found that 35% of the community supported the change, while 65% opposed it. As late as April 2025, the name had not been changed, and the mascot was still visible on the school website. According to the LPA, as of July 2021, Dickinson was one of five schools in the United States still using a midget mascot. In March 2025, school officials announced that they would be retiring the mascot because students felt uncomfortable using the name during sports events and tournaments as well as the risk of civil rights litigation for discrimination against disabled people with Achondroplasia. On May 16, 2025, the school board announced the new mascot would be the Mavericks, which went into effect at the end of the 2024-25 school year. The logo was also replaced, with the new logo having a masked cowboy riding a horse.

== Notable alumni and staff ==
- Clay S. Jenkinson (born 1955), American humanities scholar, author, and educator
- Mitch Malloy (born 1961), singer, songwriter, and producer mix and mastering engineer
- Kelly Armstrong (born 1976), U.S. Representative for North Dakota's at-large congressional district, 34th governor of North Dakota
