= Lefor, North Dakota =

Lefor
- Unincorporated community
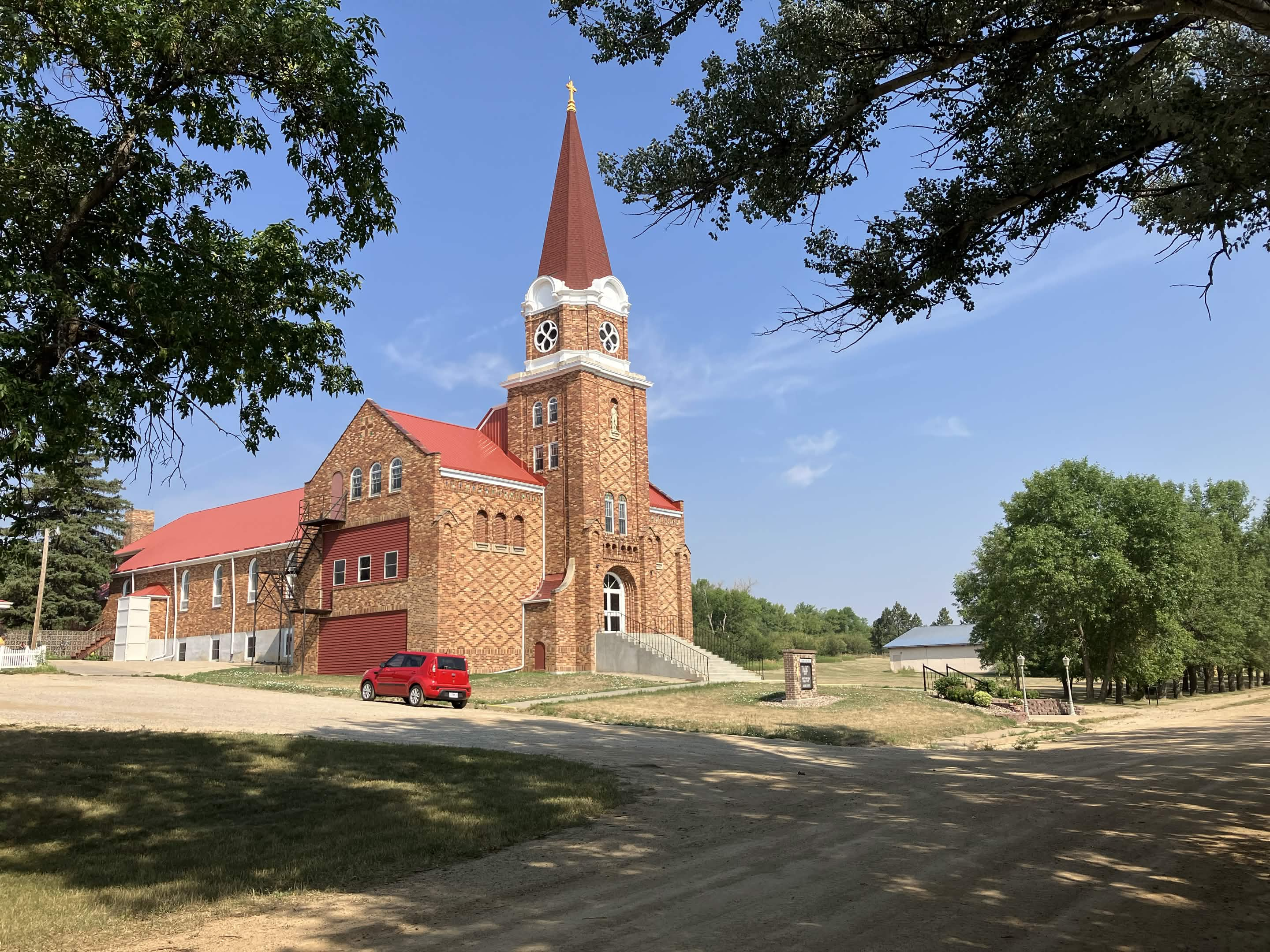
- St. Elizabeth's Queen of the Prairie Church

- Location within the state of North Dakota Lefor (the United States)
- Coordinates: 46°40′54″N 102°33′35″W
- Country: United States
- State: North Dakota
- County: Stark
- Elevation: 2,592 ft (790 m)
- Time zone: UTC-6 (Central (CST))
  - Summer (DST): UTC-5 (CDT)
- ZIP codes: 58641
- Area code: 701
- GNIS feature ID: 1029858

Lefor is an unincorporated community in southern Stark County, North Dakota, United States. It lies southeast of the city of Dickinson, the county seat of Stark County. Its elevation is 2,592 feet (790 m). Lefor's post office closed November 2, 2002, but the town still has its own ZIP code of 58641.

Lefor has the highest percentage of residents of Hungarian origin of any zip code in the United States. Most are descended from pioneers -- who were actually ethnically German -- from the Banat region who were invited to the United States in the late nineteenth and early twentieth centuries.

Lefor is part of the Dickinson Micropolitan Statistical Area.

== History ==
The Dakota Territory was acquired in the early nineteenth century, and the United States government began settling the area despite resistance from displaced natives.

Lefor was settled primarily by German-Hungarian immigrants from the Banat region who claimed land under the Homestead Act beginning in the 1890s. Most were immigrating due to harsh economic policies imposed by the Hungarian State, as well as its policy of forced assimilation into Hungarian culture. However, farmers found the land in North Dakota even more difficult to farm than the land in the Banat

Construction of the St. Elizabeth Parish construction began in 1898.

A bank was built in 1913 and ceased operations by 1934; today, all that remains is a free-standing vault.

== Climate ==
This climatic region is typified by large seasonal temperature differences, with warm to hot (and often humid) summers and cold (sometimes severely cold) winters. According to the Köppen Climate Classification system, Lefor has a humid continental climate, abbreviated "Dfb" on climate maps.
