= Gladstone, North Dakota =

- City
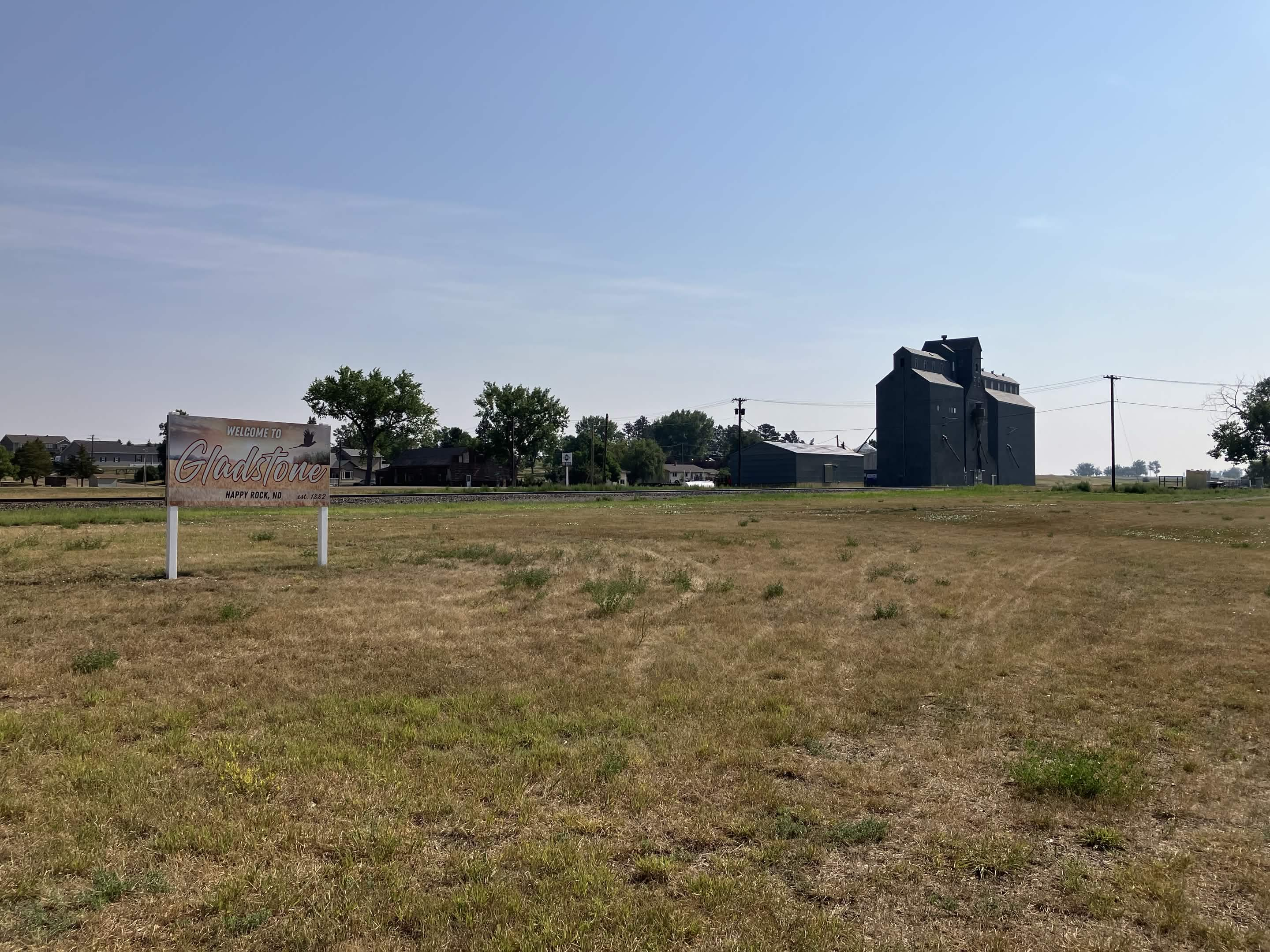

- Location of Gladstone, North Dakota
- Coordinates: 46°51′34″N 102°34′12″W
- Country: United States
- State: North Dakota
- County: Stark
- Founded: 1882

Area
  - Total: 0.37 sq mi (0.97 km^{2})
  - Land: 0.36 sq mi (0.94 km^{2})
  - Water: 0.0077 sq mi (0.02 km^{2})
- Elevation: 2,300 ft (700 m)

Population (2020)
  - Total: 271
  - Estimate (2022): 270
  - Density: 745.8/sq mi (287.96/km^{2})
- Time zone: UTC-7 (Mountain (MST))
  - Summer (DST): UTC-6 (MDT)
- ZIP code: 58630
- Area code: 701
- FIPS code: 38-30460
- GNIS feature ID: 1036055
- Website: www.gladstonend.org

Gladstone is a city in Stark County, North Dakota, United States. The population was 271 at the 2020 census. It is part of the Dickinson Micropolitan Statistical Area.

== History ==
Gladstone was laid out in 1882, and was originally built up by a group of settlers from Ripon, Wisconsin. The group's founder James Gray Campbell was joined by about 150 pioneers who included Mrs. Ira Lawrence, May (Lawrence) Sorber, Russell Lawrence (born 1882 at Gladstone), Alice Campbell Lytle (born 1882 at Gladstone), Mrs. Birdsall, Mrs. Clarence E. Eldred, Mrs. Charles Kono, Estelle Cryne Hagburg, Orrissa Cryne Elwell, Mrs. G.S. Cryne and G.S. Cryne. The city was named for British Prime Minister William Ewart Gladstone. Settlers made use of available resources including underground coal, clay for brick building, and agate sand deposits, in demand by the railroad companies, and raised high grade horses.

== Geography ==
According to the United States Census Bureau, the city has a total area of 0.35 square miles (0.91 km^{2}), of which 0.34 square miles (0.88 km^{2}) is land and 0.01 square miles (0.03 km^{2}) is water.

== Demographics ==
Historical population
Census	Pop.	Note	%±
1940	278		—
1950	224		−19.4%
1960	185		−17.4%
1970	222		20.0%
1980	317		42.8%
1990	224		−29.3%
2000	248		10.7%
2010	239		−3.6%
2020	271		13.4%
2022 (est.)	270		−0.4%
U.S. Decennial Census; 2020 Census

=== 2010 census ===
As of the census of 2010, there were 239 people, 99 households, and 62 families residing in the city. The population density was 702.9 inhabitants per square mile (271.4/km^{2}). There were 113 housing units at an average density of 332.4 per square mile (128.3/km^{2}). The racial makeup of the city was 96.2% White, 0.4% Asian, 0.8% from other races, and 2.5% from two or more races. Hispanic or Latino of any race were 1.3% of the population.

There were 99 households, of which 30.3% had children under the age of 18 living with them, 49.5% were married couples living together, 8.1% had a female householder with no husband present, 5.1% had a male householder with no wife present, and 37.4% were non-families. 25.3% of all households were made up of individuals, and 4% had someone living alone who was 65 years of age or older. The average household size was 2.41 and the average family size was 2.94.

The median age in the city was 43.4 years. 23.4% of residents were under the age of 18; 6.8% were between the ages of 18 and 24; 24.3% were from 25 to 44; 31.5% were from 45 to 64; and 14.2% were 65 years of age or older. The gender makeup of the city was 52.7% male and 47.3% female.

=== 2000 census ===
As of the census of 2000, there were 248 people, 95 households, and 64 families residing in the city. The population density was 695.8 inhabitants per square mile (268.6/km^{2}). There were 106 housing units at an average density of 297.4 per square mile (114.8/km^{2}). The racial makeup of the city was 95.56% White, 1.21% Native American, 2.42% from other races, and 0.81% from two or more races. Hispanic or Latino of any race were 4.44% of the population.

There were 95 households, out of which 34.7% had children under the age of 18 living with them, 55.8% were married couples living together, 7.4% had a female householder with no husband present, and 32.6% were non-families. 25.3% of all households were made up of individuals, and 9.5% had someone living alone who was 65 years of age or older. The average household size was 2.61 and the average family size was 3.14.

In the city, the population was spread out, with 27.4% under the age of 18, 10.1% from 18 to 24, 29.8% from 25 to 44, 21.0% from 45 to 64, and 11.7% who were 65 years of age or older. The median age was 33 years. For every 100 females, there were 115.7 males. For every 100 females age 18 and over, there were 122.2 males.

The median income for a household in the city was $26,563, and the median income for a family was $29,688. Males had a median income of $22,083 versus $18,750 for females. The per capita income for the city was $12,447. About 12.7% of families and 20.8% of the population were below the poverty line, including 32.1% of those under the age of eighteen and 28.6% of those 65 or over.
