= Saints Peter and Paul Church (New Hradec, North Dakota) =

Historic church in North Dakota, United States

- U.S. National Register of Historic Places
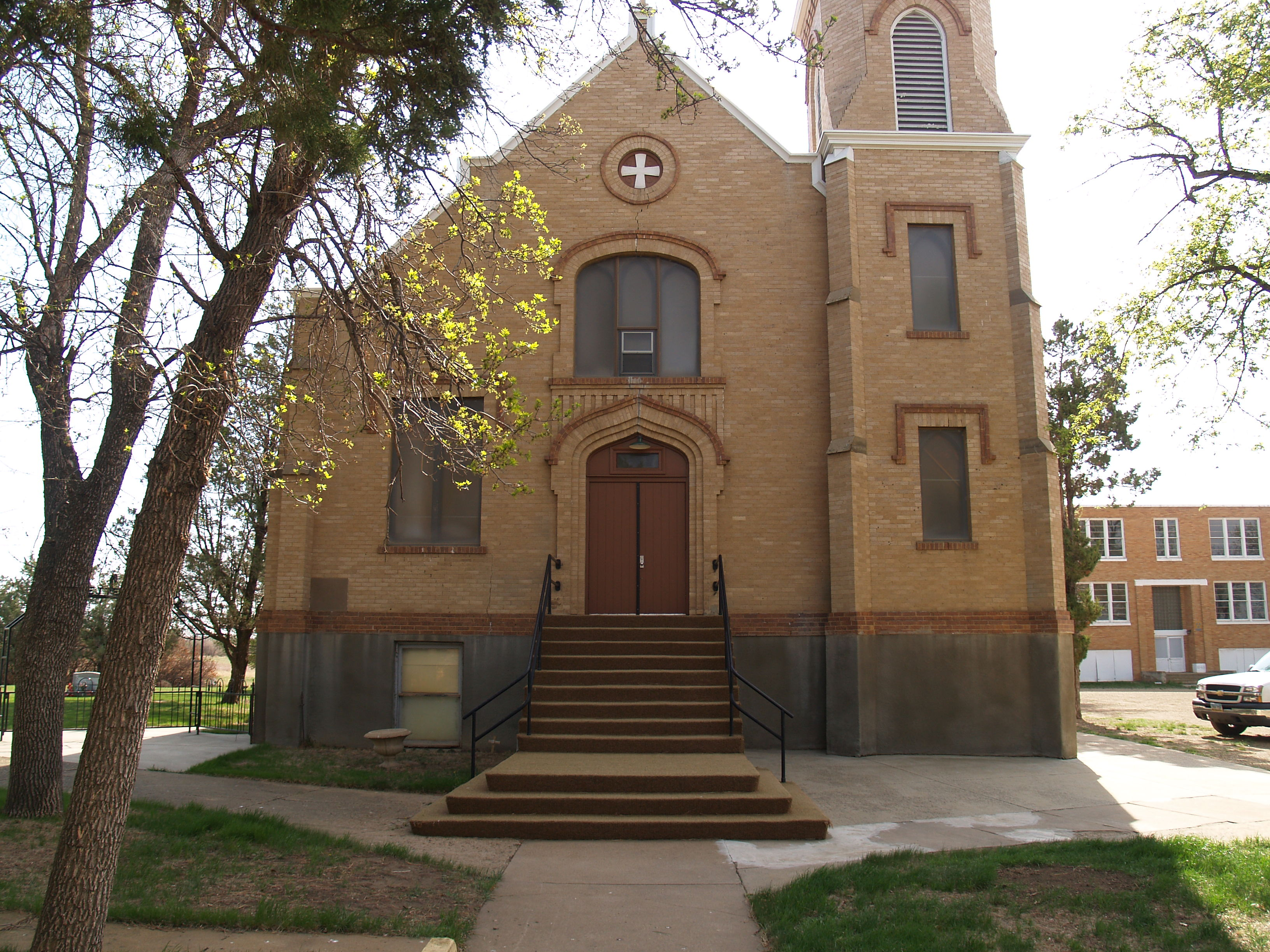
- The front of Saints Peter and Paul Church

- Location within North Dakota Location within the United States
- Location: New Hradec, North Dakota
- Coordinates: 47°0′2″N 102°53′1″W
- Area: 0.5 acres (0.20 ha)
- Built: 1917
- Architect: Ressler, Nick
- NRHP reference No.: 86000161
- Added to NRHP: February 3, 1986

Saints Peter and Paul Church is a Roman Catholic church in New Hradec, North Dakota. The church, which was built in 1917, was designed by Nick Ressler with elements of the Gothic Revival and Tudor Revival styles. The church has historically served a unique congregation of Czech immigrants from the Crimea and is considered to be the most significant representation of New Hradec's Czech heritage. It was listed on the National Register of Historic Places in 1986.

== History ==
New Hradec was founded in 1887 by Bohemian immigrants from the Crimea; its first settlers are the only documented Bohemian immigrants from the Crimea to have settled in America. These settlers established the parish of Saints Peter and Paul in 1898 by building a wood church. This church burned down in May 1917, and the congregation built the current structure later in the year. The new church was dedicated and its cornerstone laid on August 19, 1917; it was designed by Nick Ressler of Mandan and contracted by Charles Bakke of Dickinson. From 1918 to 1950, the church also served as a school, with classes taught by the Sisters of Notre Dame. Throughout its history, the church has used the Czech language, hosted and been supported by Czech cultural organizations and has been a defining institution for the Czech community of New Hradec. Due to its cultural significance to the local Czech community, it was placed on the National Register of Historic Places on February 3, 1986.

== Architecture ==
Saints Peter and Paul Church was designed by the architect Petr Stiffy, and built with common and brown brick and exhibits elements of the Gothic Revival and Tudor Revival styles. In particular, Tudor influences can be seen in the tracery on the windows, the archway around the door, and the church's buttresses. The structure consists of a church and a school building, the latter being approximately half the size of the former. The church has a bell tower with an eight-sided wooden spire at its peak. The interior of the church seats 300 and has a high degree of historical integrity, including the original wood floors and pews. A significant amount of plaster statues can be found inside the church, including plaster Stations of the Cross. The church is considered to have remarkable integrity of both design and building materials for its location and function.
