= New Hradec, North Dakota =

- Unincorporated community
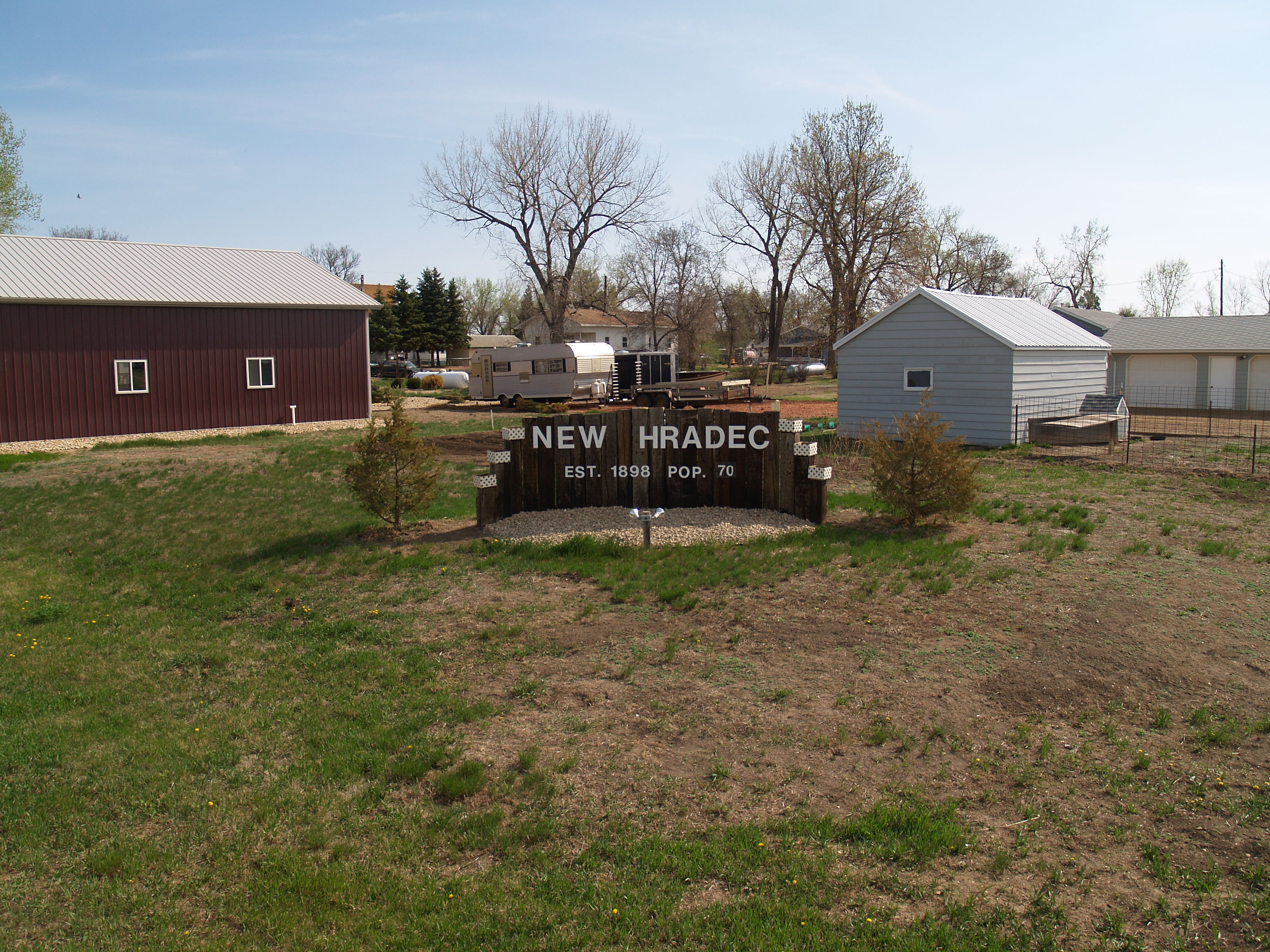
- New Hradec welcome sign

- Location within North Dakota Location within the United States
- Coordinates: 46°59′58″N 102°53′04″W
- Country: United States
- State: North Dakota
- County: Dunn
- Elevation: 2,490 ft (760 m)
- Time zone: UTC-7 (Mountain (MST))
  - Summer (DST): UTC-6 (MDT)
- Area code: 701
- GNIS feature ID: 1030392

New Hradec is an unincorporated community in southern Dunn County, North Dakota, United States. It is 9.4 miles (15.1 km) north-northwest of Dickinson.

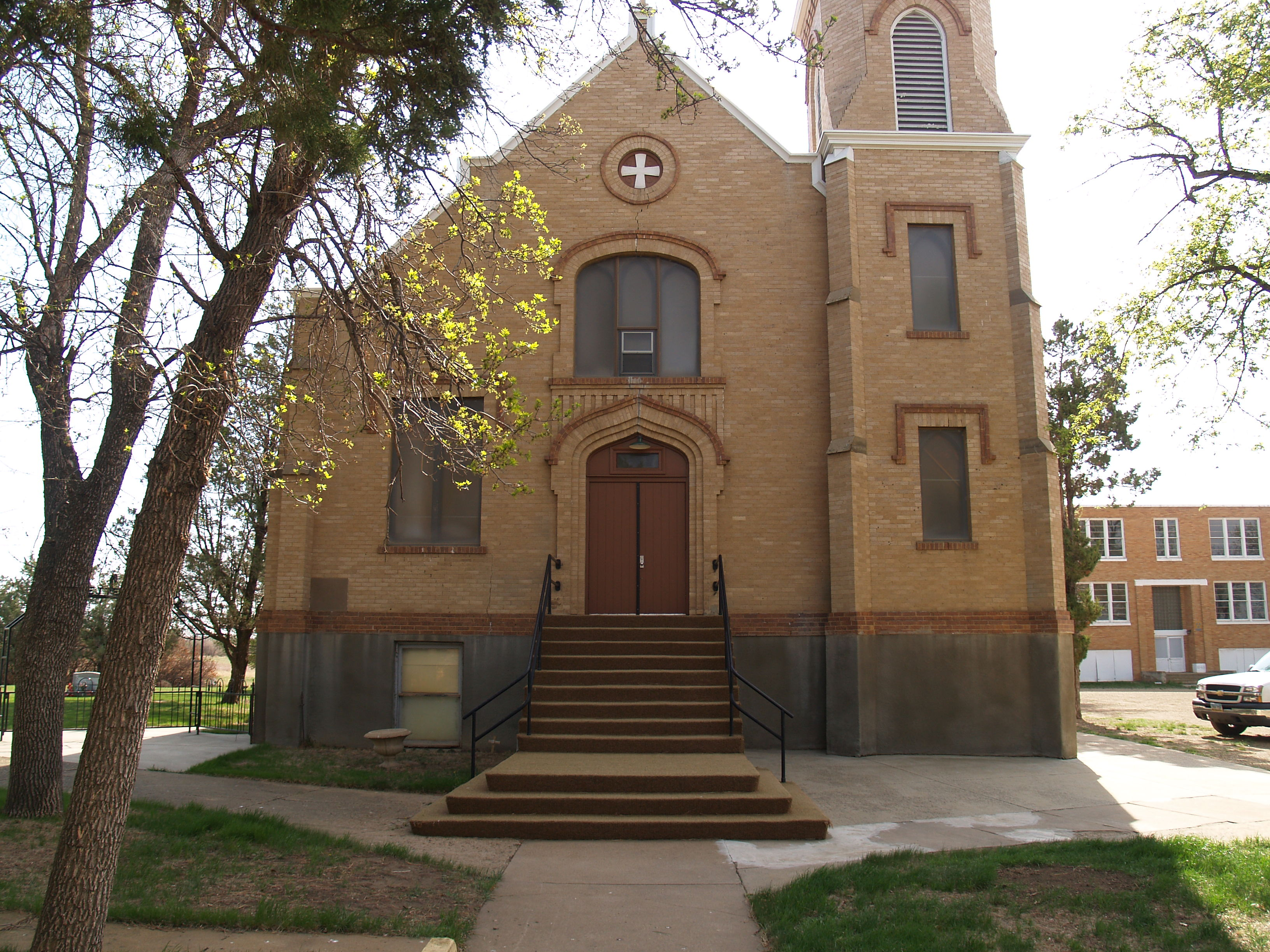
Saints Peter and Paul Church

New Hradec was established in 1887 by Bohemian immigrants from the city of Czechograd in the Crimea, Ukraine; they had emigrated from Hradec Králové to the Crimea in 1861 prior to coming to the United States. These Bohemians populated much of the area northwest of Dickinson, and are the only documented Bohemians from the Crimea to have settled in America. The community was originally named "Novy Hradec", Czech for "New Castle"; this was later changed to New Hradec. The settlers founded the Saints Peter and Paul Church in 1898; the current church building was constructed in 1917, and is listed on the National Register of Historic Places. The congregation platted the community in the same year.
