= North Dakota Highway 32 =

State Highway in North Dakota, U.S.

North Dakota Highway 32
- ND 32 highlighted in red

Route information
- Maintained by NDDOT
- Length: 236.674 mi (380.890 km)
- Existed: 1926–present

Major junctions
- South end: SD 27 at South Dakota state line near Havana
- I-94 / US 52 in Oriska; ND 200 by Finley; US 2 in Petersburg and Niagara; ND 5 near Concrete
- North end: PTH 32 at the Canadian border north of Walhalla

Location
- Country: United States
- State: North Dakota
- Counties: Sargent, Ransom, Barnes, Steele, Griggs, Nelson, Grand Forks, Walsh, Pembina

Highway system
- North Dakota State Highway System; Interstate; US; State
← ND 31	→ ND 34

North Dakota Highway 32 (ND 32) is a major north–south highway located that traverses portions of nine counties in eastern North Dakota. The 236.674-mile-long (380.890 km) highway is one of several north–south routes in the state that connects the Canadian border to the state's southern border with South Dakota.

== Route description ==
ND 32 begins at the South Dakota state line near Havana, where going south, it continues as South Dakota Highway 27. After the first 10 miles (16 km), it arrives in Forman, the county seat of Sargent. Continuing north, it enters Ransom County. A brief concurrency with ND 46 at the Ransom-Barnes-Cass County tri-point, turning west following the Ransom/Barnes County line, ND 32 finally enters Barnes County. It mainly traverses rural areas of eastern Barnes County, including an intersection with I-94/US 52 at its exit 302 interchange.

About 42 miles (68 km) north of the I-94 interchange, ND 32 finally reaches Finley, the Steele County seat. In the Sharon area, it straddles the Steele/Griggs County line in its run between the ND 45 junction and the Nelson County line near Aneta.

In Nelson County, ND 32 continues north to Petersburg, where it begins a short concurrency with US 2 which lasts until reaching Niagara, just inside Grand Forks County. It traverses mainly rural areas of northwestern Grand Forks, central Walsh, and western Pembina Counties. In Pembina County, it has brief concurrencies with North Dakota Highways 66 and 5. Walhalla is the last town or community that ND 32 goes through before reaching the Canadian border. ND 32 ends at the Canadian border. At the Walhalla-Winkler Border Crossing, upon entry into southern Manitoba, the road becomes Manitoba Highway 32 (PTH 32), continuing in a northerly direction to Winkler.

== Points of interest along the route ==
- Gingras Trading Post State Historic Site, Walhalla

== Major intersections ==
County	Location	mi	km	Destinations	Notes
Sargent	Havana	0.000	0.000	SD 27 south – Britton	ND 32’s southern terminus at the South Dakota state line
Sargent	Forman	10.308	16.589	ND 11 east – Lidgerwood, Hankinson	Begin concurrency with ND 11
Sargent	Forman	11.423	18.384	ND 11 west – Cogswell, Oakes	End concurrency with ND 11
Sargent	Gwinner	20.205	32.517	ND 13 east – Milnor	Begin concurrency with ND 13
Sargent	Gwinner	21.205	34.126	ND 13 west to ND 1	End concurrency with ND 13
Ransom	Lisbon	36.517	58.768	ND 27	
Ransom		49.510	79.679	ND 46 east – Enderlin, Kindred	Begin concurrency with ND 46 and the Ransom/Barnes County line
Ransom–Barnes county line		55.546	89.393	ND 46 west – US 281	End concurrency with ND 46 at the Ransom/Barnes County line
Barnes	Oriska	75.982	122.281	I-94 / US 52 – Fargo, Valley City	I-94 Exit 302
Barnes	Pillsbury	95.129	153.095	ND 26 west – Sibley, Dazey	Eastern terminus of ND 26
Steele		104.086	167.510	ND 38 south – Hope	Northern terminus of ND 38
Steele		112.875	181.655	ND 200 west – Cooperstown	Begin concurrency with ND 200
Steele	Finley	117.882	189.713	ND 200 east – Mayville	End concurrency with ND 200
Steele–Griggs county line		130.732	210.393	ND 45 south – Cooperstown	Eastern terminus of ND 45; ND 32 follows Steele/Griggs county line northward from here
Nelson		140.714	226.457	ND 15 – Northwood, McVille	
Nelson	Petersburg	158.736	255.461	US 2 west – Devils Lake	Begin concurrency with US 2
Grand Forks	Niagara	164.197	264.249	US 2 east – Grand Forks	End concurrency with US 2
Walsh		191.471	308.143	ND 17 – Park River, Adams	
Pembina	Gardar	205.496	330.714	ND 66 east – Crystal, St. Thomas	Begin concurrency with ND 66
Pembina		207.500	333.939	ND 66 west – Milton	End concurrency with ND 66
Pembina		216.551	348.505	ND 5 east – Cavalier	Begin concurrency with ND 5
Pembina	Concrete			ND 89 south – Cavalier Air Force Station	Northern terminus of ND 89
Pembina	Concrete	219.556	353.341	ND 5 west – Langdon	End concurrency with ND 5
Pembina	US-Canada border	236.674	380.890	PTH 32 north – Winkler	Northern terminus at the international border
1.000 mi = 1.609 km; 1.000 km = 0.621 mi: Concurrency terminus

== See also ==
- List of Canada-United States border crossings
