= North Dakota Highway 11 =

State highway in North Dakota, US

North Dakota Highway 11

Route information
- Maintained by NDDOT
- Length: 182.459 mi (293.639 km)
- Existed: 1926–present

Major junctions
- West end: US 83 near Hague
- ND 3 in Ashley; US 281 in Ellendale; ND 1 from Ludden to Oakes; ND 32 in Forman; ND 18 in Lidgerwood; I-29 / US 81 near Hankinson
- East end: MN 55 at the Minnesota border in Fairmount

Location
- Country: United States
- State: North Dakota
- Counties: Dickey, McIntosh, Emmons, Sargent, Richland

Highway system
- North Dakota State Highway System; Interstate; US; State
← ND 10	→ US 12

North Dakota Highway 11 (ND 11) is a 182.459-mile-long (293.639 km) east–west state highway in the U.S. state of North Dakota. The highway's western terminus is at U.S. Route 83 (US 83) west of Hague, and its eastern terminus continues as Minnesota State Highway 55 (MN 55) at the Minnesota/ North Dakota border.

== Route description ==
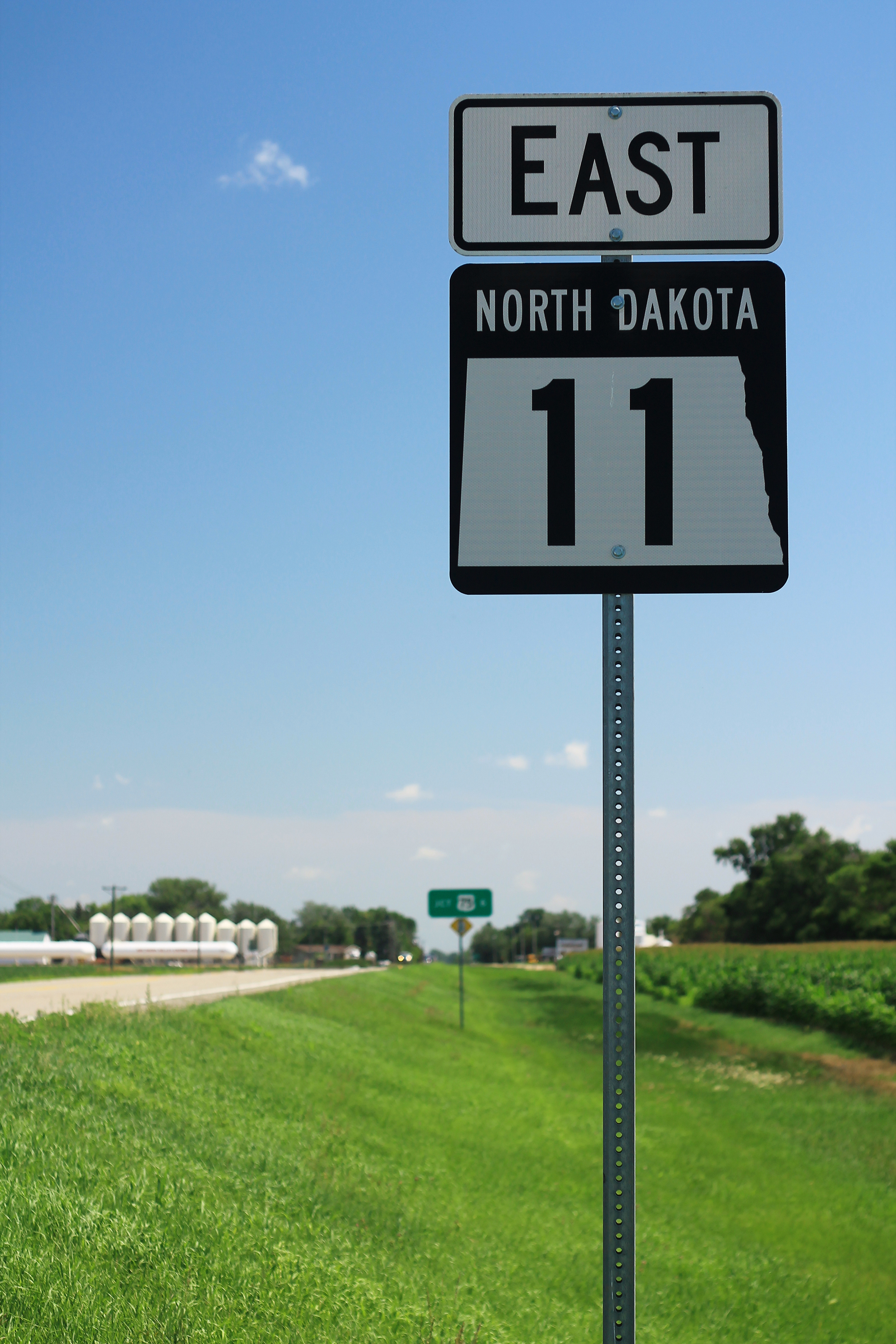
ND 11 eastbound sign

ND 11 begins at an intersection with US 83 and goes for 3 miles until going through the town of Hague. The road continues until it meets up with ND 3 and runs concurrently 8.4 miles where it continues south. After moving through Ashley, the route goes 42.6 miles until it gets to Ellendale where it runs concurrently with US 281 for half a mile through the town. After another 18 miles, the route starts a concurrency with ND 1 after crossing the James River. The route moves through Ludden and moves north until it ends its concurrency with ND 1, turning east. the route goes south of Cogswell and continues until meeting up with ND 32 in Forman. The two run concurrently south for around a mile until ND 11 continues east going north of Cayuga and Geneseo. The route then goes until meeting up with ND 18 in Lidgerwood where it runs concurrently south through the town and then southeast for 3 miles when ND 18 moves south. ND 11 moves east and goes through Hankinson and passes over I-29 / US 81 exit 8. The route continues east until going through the southern side of Fairmount and goes until the state line with Minnesota at the Bois de Sioux River, where the road becomes MN 55.

== Major intersections ==
County	Location	mi	km	Destinations	Notes
Emmons		0.000	0.000	US 83 – Herreid, Strasburg, Linton	Western terminus
McIntosh		26.774	43.089	ND 3 north – Wishek	Western end of ND 3 concurrency
McIntosh	Ashley	35.157	56.580	ND 3 south – Eureka	Eastern end of ND 3 concurrency
Dickey		56.727	91.293	ND 56 north – Kulm	Southern terminus of ND 56
Dickey	Ellendale	77.830	125.255	US 281 south	Western end of US 281 concurrency
Dickey	Ellendale	78.332	126.063	US 281 north – Edgeley, Jamestown	Eastern end of US 281 concurrency
Dickey		96.487	155.281	ND 1 south – Hecla	Western end of ND 1 concurrency
Dickey		106.242	170.980	ND 1 north – Oakes	Eastern end of ND 1 concurrency
Sargent	Forman	128.532	206.852	ND 32 north – Gwinner	Western end of ND 32 concurrency
Sargent		129.467	208.357	ND 32 south – Havana	Eastern end of ND 32 concurrency
Richland	Lidgerwood	152.687	245.726	ND 18 north – Wyndmere	Western end of ND 18 concurrency
Richland		155.249	249.849	ND 18 south – Sisseton	Eastern end of ND 18 concurrency
Richland		169.519	272.814	I-29 / US 81 – Fargo, Sioux Falls (South Dakota)	I-29 Exit 8
Richland	Fairmount	180.012	289.701	ND 127 – Wahpeton, State Line	
Richland		182.459	293.639	MN 55 – Nashua	Continuation into Minnesota
Concurrency terminus

== See also ==
- List of state highways in North Dakota
- List of highways numbered 11
