= Wild Rice River (North Dakota) =

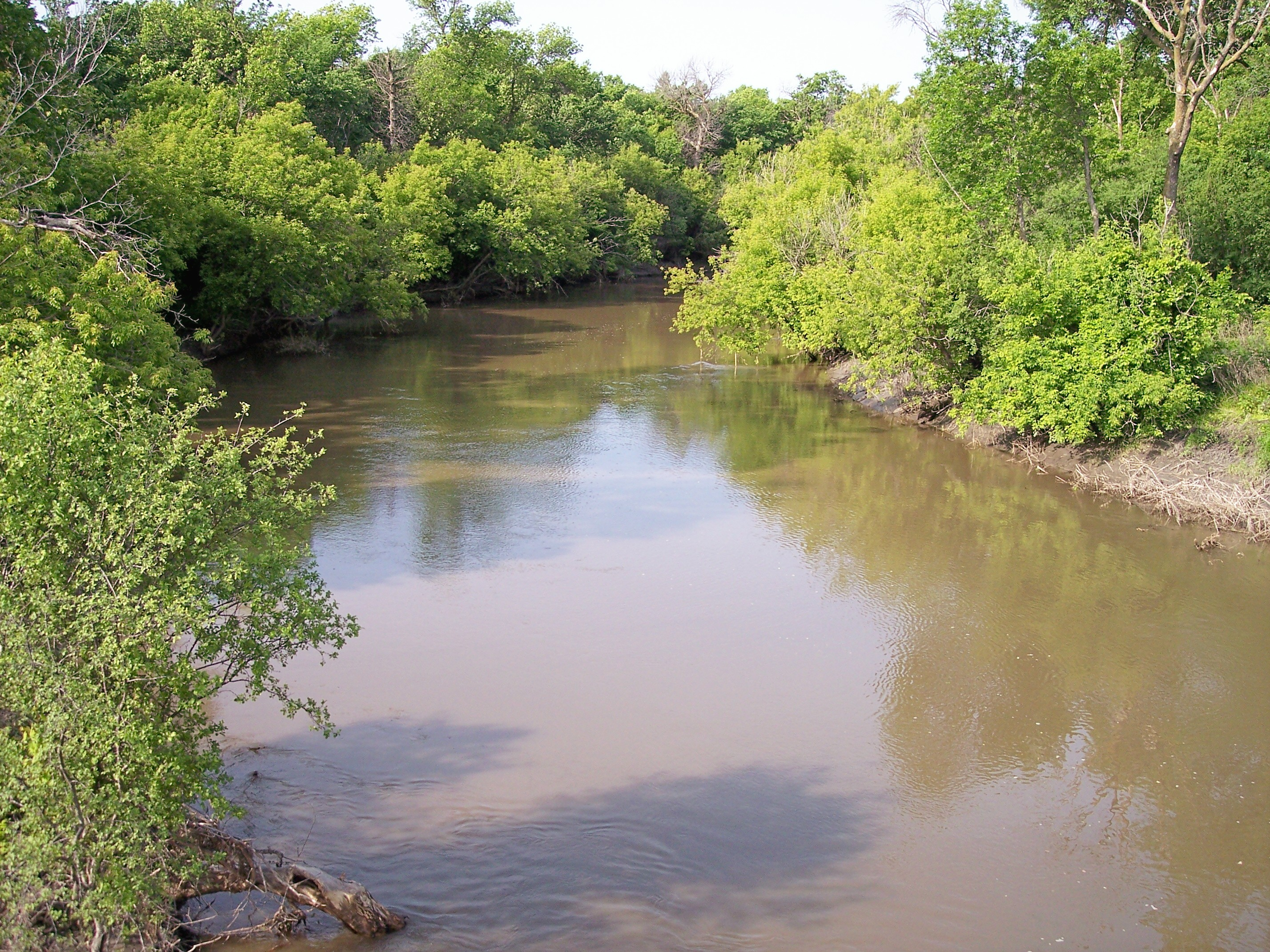
- The Wild Rice River near Abercrombie in 2007

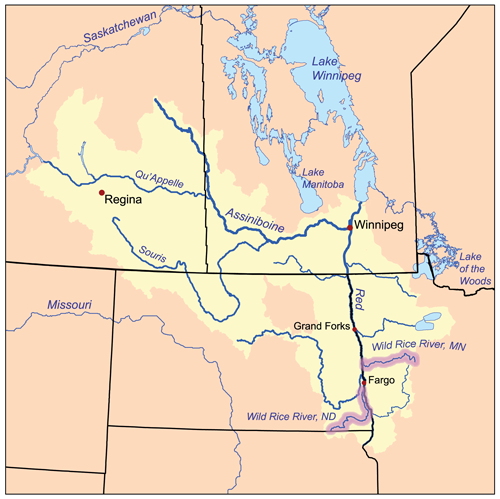
- The Red River drainage basin, with the Wild Rice Rivers of North Dakota and Minnesota highlighted

Location
- Country: United States
- State: North Dakota

Physical characteristics
- Source
  - location: Brampton Township, Sargent County
  - coordinates: 46°00′56″N 97°47′08″W
  - elevation: 1,283 ft (391 m)
- Mouth: Red River of the North
  - location: near Frontier, Cass County
  - coordinates: 46°45′24″N 96°47′24″W
  - elevation: 879 ft (268 m)
- Length: 251 mi (404 km)
- Basin size: 2,233 mi^{2} (5,780 km^{2})
- Discharge
  - location: near Abercrombie
  - average: 104 cu ft/s (2.9 m^{3}/s)
  - minimum: 0 cu ft/s (0 m^{3}/s)
  - maximum: 9,540 cu ft/s (270 m^{3}/s)
- Discharge
  - location: near Rutland
  - average: 8.36 cu ft/s (0.237 m^{3}/s)

The Wild Rice River is a tributary of the Red River of the North, approximately 251 miles (404 km) long, in southeastern North Dakota in the United States. Via the Red River, Lake Winnipeg, and the Nelson River, it is part of the watershed of Hudson Bay. The Wild Rice River drains an area of 2,233 square miles (5,780 km^{2}) in the Red River Valley region. Its tributaries also drain a small part of northeastern South Dakota. Despite its length, it is a fairly small stream, flowing at an average rate of approximately 100 cubic feet per second (2.8 m^{3}/s).

The river was so named for the former abundance of wild rice along its course.

== Course ==
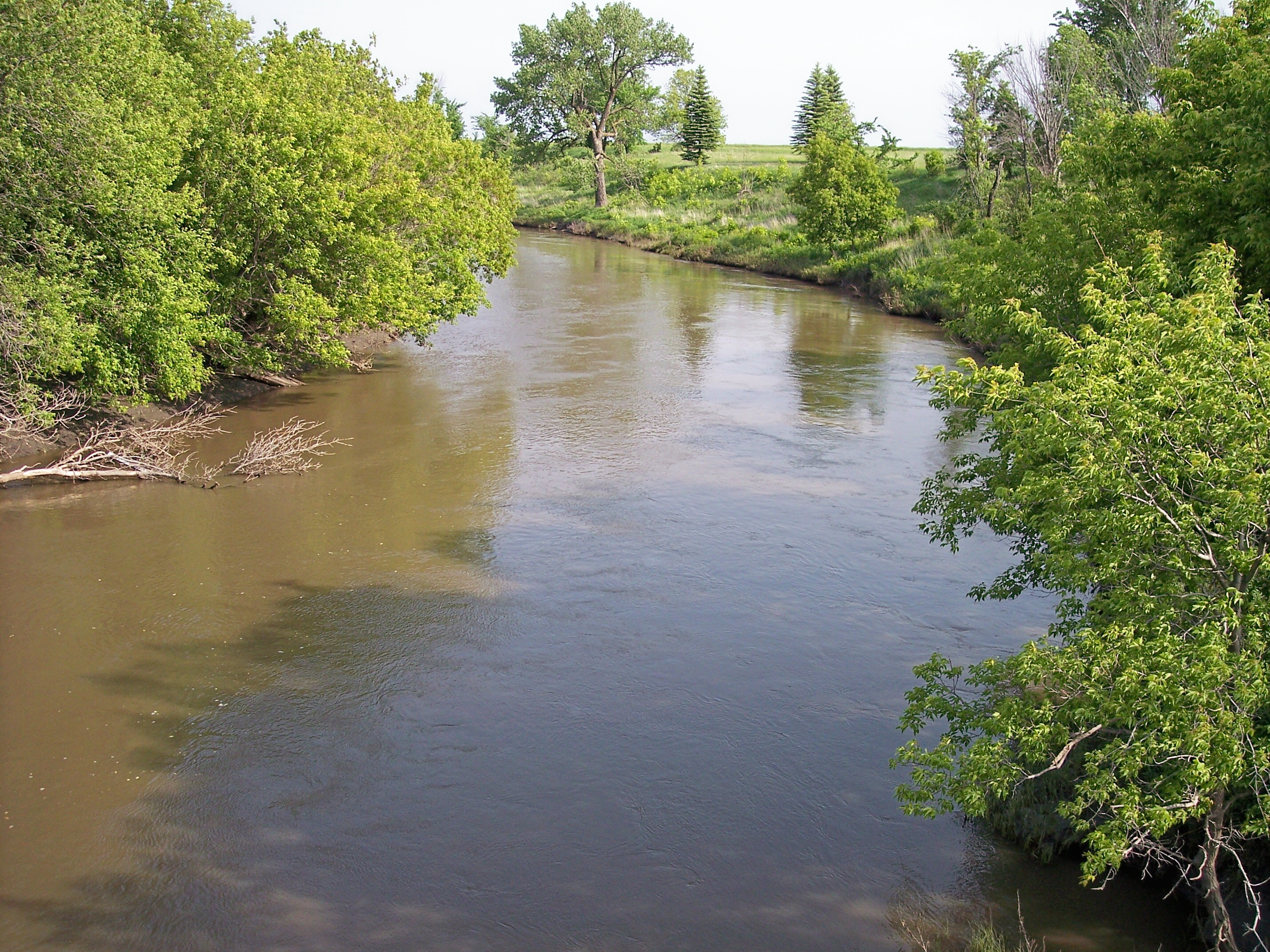
The Wild Rice River near Abercrombie in 2007

The Wild Rice River rises as an intermittent stream in Brampton Township in southeastern Sargent County, approximately 6 miles (10 km) south of Cogswell. It initially flows generally eastwardly in a winding course through Sargent and Richland counties, through the Tewaukon National Wildlife Refuge and past the towns of Cayuga, Mantador and Great Bend. Past Great Bend, the river turns northward; from west of the city of Wahpeton it generally parallels the Red River in a winding channel at a distance of approximately 3 to 7 miles (5 to 11 km). It flows into the Red River in southeastern Cass County, approximately 3 miles (5 km) southeast of Frontier and 7 miles (11 km) south of Fargo.

== Flow rate ==
The United States Geological Survey operates a stream gauge on the river 3.2 miles (5.1 km) northwest of Abercrombie. Between 1932 and 2005, the annual mean flow of the river at the gauge was 104 cubic feet per second (2.9 m^{3}/s). The river's highest flow during the period was 9,540 cubic feet per second (270 m^{3}/s) on April 11, 1969. Readings of zero have also been recorded.

At an upstream gauge near Rutland in Sargent County, the annual mean flow between 1960 and 1982 was 8.36 cubic feet per second (0.237 m^{3}/s). A reading of 2,700 cubic feet per second (76 m^{3}/s) was recorded on April 3, 1997.

== See also ==
- List of rivers in North Dakota
