= Brampton Township =

Brampton Township may refer to:

- Brampton Township, Michigan
- Brampton Township, Sargent County, North Dakota
