= Berlin Township, North Dakota =

Berlin Township is the name of given to 3 active and 1 defunct townships in the U.S. state of North Dakota:

== Active townships ==
- Berlin Township, Cass County, North Dakota
- Berlin Township, Wells County, North Dakota
- Berlin Township, Sheridan County, North Dakota

== Defunct townships ==
- Berlin Township, Richland County, North Dakota. Renamed Brandenburg Township

== See also ==
- Berlin Township (disambiguation)
