= 2000 United States presidential election in North Dakota =

- November 7, 2000
- Turnout: 61.71%

Nominee	George W. Bush	Al Gore
Party	Republican	Democratic–NPL
Home state	Texas	Tennessee
Running mate	Dick Cheney	Joe Lieberman
Electoral vote	3	0
Popular vote	174,852	95,284
Percentage	60.66%	33.06%
County results
Bush
40–50%
50–60%
60–70%
70–80%
Gore
60–70%
President before election
Bill Clinton
Democratic-NPL
Elected President
George W. Bush
Republican

The 2000 United States presidential election in North Dakota took place on November 7, 2000, and was part of the 2000 United States presidential election. Voters chose three representatives, or electors to the Electoral College, who voted for president and vice president.

North Dakota was won by Governor George W. Bush with a double-digit margin of victory of 27.6%. Bush won most of the counties of the state. He won all but two counties: Rolette County, which Gore won with 61% of the vote and Sioux County, which Gore won with 70% of the vote. North Dakota gave Pat Buchanan his best performance in the nation with 2.5% of the vote, whilst third-party candidates performed very well overall, obtaining a total of 6.6% of the vote.

Winning 60.66% of the popular vote, North Dakota proved to be Bush's fifth strongest state in the 2000 election after Wyoming, Idaho, Utah and Nebraska.

== General election ==
=== Polling ===
Poll source	Date(s)	Sample size	Margin of error	George W. Bush (R)	Al Gore (D)	Other / undecided (Note: Calculated by taking the difference of 100% and all other candidates combined.)
Rasmussen Reports	October 21, 2000	1,258	—	49%	34%	17%

=== Results ===
2000 United States presidential election in North Dakota
Party	Candidate	Votes	Percentage	Electoral votes
Republican	George W. Bush	174,852	60.66%	3
Democratic-NPL	Al Gore	95,284	33.06%	0
Independent	Ralph Nader	9,486	3.29%	0
Reform	Patrick Buchanan	7,288	2.53%	0
Libertarian	Harry Browne	660	0.23%	0
Independent	Howard Phillips	373	0.13%	0
Independent	John Hagelin	313	0.11%	0
Totals		288,256	100.00%	3
Voter turnout				60%

==== Results by county ====
County	George W. Bush Republican		Al Gore Democratic-NPL		Various candidates Other parties		Margin		Total votes cast
County	#	%	#	%	#	%	#	%	Total votes cast
Adams	826	71.21%	286	24.66%	48	4.13%	540	46.55%	1,160
Barnes	3,452	60.06%	1,933	33.63%	363	6.31%	1,519	26.43%	5,748
Benson	1,055	48.98%	952	44.20%	147	6.82%	103	4.78%	2,154
Billings	394	75.05%	82	15.62%	49	9.33%	312	59.43%	525
Bottineau	2,349	63.66%	1,173	31.79%	168	4.55%	1,176	31.87%	3,690
Bowman	1,080	73.42%	330	22.43%	61	4.15%	750	50.99%	1,471
Burke	698	67.18%	296	28.49%	45	4.33%	402	38.69%	1,039
Burleigh	22,467	65.16%	9,842	28.54%	2,173	6.30%	12,625	36.62%	34,482
Cass	33,536	56.85%	21,451	36.36%	4,008	6.79%	12,085	20.49%	58,995
Cavalier	1,513	63.81%	618	26.06%	240	10.13%	895	37.75%	2,371
Dickey	1,853	66.51%	806	28.93%	127	4.56%	1,047	37.58%	2,786
Divide	443	55.79%	306	38.54%	45	5.67%	137	17.25%	794
Dunn	1,124	65.05%	474	27.43%	130	7.52%	650	37.62%	1,728
Eddy	703	55.44%	458	36.12%	107	8.44%	245	19.32%	1,268
Emmons	1,430	71.79%	405	20.33%	157	7.88%	1,025	51.46%	1,992
Foster	1,172	67.24%	474	27.19%	97	5.57%	698	40.05%	1,743
Golden Valley	611	75.25%	156	19.21%	45	5.54%	455	56.04%	812
Grand Forks	15,875	55.93%	10,593	37.32%	1,917	6.75%	5,282	18.61%	28,385
Grant	1,077	75.47%	235	16.47%	115	8.06%	842	59.00%	1,427
Griggs	920	62.63%	484	32.95%	65	4.42%	436	29.68%	1,469
Hettinger	1,057	69.59%	353	23.24%	109	7.17%	704	46.35%	1,519
Kidder	837	65.60%	283	22.18%	156	12.22%	554	43.42%	1,276
LaMoure	1,590	64.42%	689	27.92%	189	7.66%	901	36.50%	2,468
Logan	812	70.92%	223	19.48%	110	9.60%	589	51.44%	1,145
McHenry	1,682	61.45%	888	32.44%	167	6.11%	794	29.01%	2,737
McIntosh	1,178	71.96%	350	21.38%	109	6.66%	828	50.58%	1,637
McKenzie	1,634	69.12%	653	27.62%	77	3.26%	981	41.50%	2,364
McLean	2,891	62.23%	1,465	31.53%	290	6.24%	1,426	30.70%	4,646
Mercer	2,984	68.55%	1,011	23.23%	358	8.22%	1,973	45.32%	4,353
Morton	6,993	62.31%	3,439	30.64%	791	7.05%	3,554	31.67%	11,223
Mountrail	1,466	50.62%	1,256	43.37%	174	6.01%	210	7.25%	2,896
Nelson	1,031	56.03%	687	37.34%	122	6.63%	344	18.69%	1,840
Oliver	709	67.46%	244	23.22%	98	9.32%	465	44.24%	1,051
Pembina	2,430	64.30%	1,093	28.92%	256	6.78%	1,337	35.38%	3,779
Pierce	1,348	68.39%	500	25.37%	123	6.24%	848	43.02%	1,971
Ramsey	3,005	60.38%	1,658	33.31%	314	6.31%	1,347	27.07%	4,977
Ransom	1,488	54.73%	1,080	39.72%	151	5.55%	408	15.01%	2,719
Renville	820	61.56%	443	33.26%	69	5.18%	377	28.30%	1,332
Richland	4,999	62.37%	2,490	31.07%	526	6.56%	2,509	31.30%	8,015
Rolette	1,416	32.20%	2,681	60.96%	301	6.84%	-1,265	-28.76%	4,398
Sargent	1,103	50.50%	959	43.91%	122	5.59%	144	6.59%	2,184
Sheridan	707	76.19%	161	17.35%	60	6.46%	546	58.84%	928
Sioux	269	25.84%	724	69.55%	48	4.61%	-455	-43.71%	1,041
Slope	316	71.49%	85	19.23%	41	9.28%	231	52.26%	442
Stark	6,387	65.33%	2,784	28.47%	606	6.20%	3,603	36.86%	9,777
Steele	655	54.13%	475	39.26%	80	6.61%	180	14.87%	1,210
Stutsman	5,488	60.19%	3,067	33.64%	563	6.17%	2,421	26.55%	9,118
Towner	694	58.37%	410	34.48%	85	7.15%	284	23.89%	1,189
Traill	2,392	58.17%	1,512	36.77%	208	5.06%	880	21.40%	4,112
Walsh	3,099	59.80%	1,743	33.64%	340	6.56%	1,356	26.16%	5,182
Ward	13,997	62.26%	7,533	33.51%	952	4.23%	6,464	28.75%	22,482
Wells	1,610	66.80%	661	27.43%	139	5.77%	949	39.37%	2,410
Williams	5,187	66.44%	2,330	29.85%	290	3.71%	2,857	36.59%	7,807
Totals	174,852	60.66%	95,284	33.05%	18,131	6.29%	79,568	27.61%	288,267

===== Counties that flipped from Democratic to Republican =====
- Benson (largest CDP: Fort Totten)
- Divide (largest city: Crosby)
- Eddy (largest city: New Rockford)
- Mountrail (largest city: Stanley)
- Nelson (largest city: Lakota)
- Ramsey (largest city: Devils Lake)
- Ransom (largest city: Lisbon)
- Sargent (largest city: Gwinner)
- Steele (largest city: Finley)
- Towner (largest city: Cando)
- Traill (largest city: Mayville)

==== By congressional district ====
Due to the state's low population, only one congressional district is allocated. This district is an at-large district, because it covers the entire state, and thus is equivalent to the statewide election results.

District	Bush	Gore	Representative
At-large	60.7%	33.1%	Earl Pomeroy

== Electors ==
Technically the voters of North Dakota cast their ballots for electors: representatives to the Electoral College. North Dakota is allocated three electors because it has one congressional district and two senators. All candidates who appear on the ballot or qualify to receive write-in votes must submit a list of three electors, who pledge to vote for their candidate and their running mate. Whoever wins the majority of votes in the state is awarded all three electoral votes. Their chosen electors then vote for president and vice president. Although electors are pledged to their candidate and running mate, they are not obligated to vote for them. An elector who votes for someone other than their candidate is known as a faithless elector.

The electors of each state and the District of Columbia met on December 18, 2000 to cast their votes for president and vice president. The Electoral College itself never meets as one body. Instead, the electors from each state and the District of Columbia met in their respective capitols.

The following were the members of the Electoral College from the state. All were pledged to and voted for George W. Bush and Dick Cheney:

1. Rosemarie Myrdal
2. Edward T. Schafer
3. Bryce Streibel

== See also ==
- United States presidential elections in North Dakota
- Presidency of George W. Bush
