= Stirum, North Dakota =

Stirum
- Unincorporated community
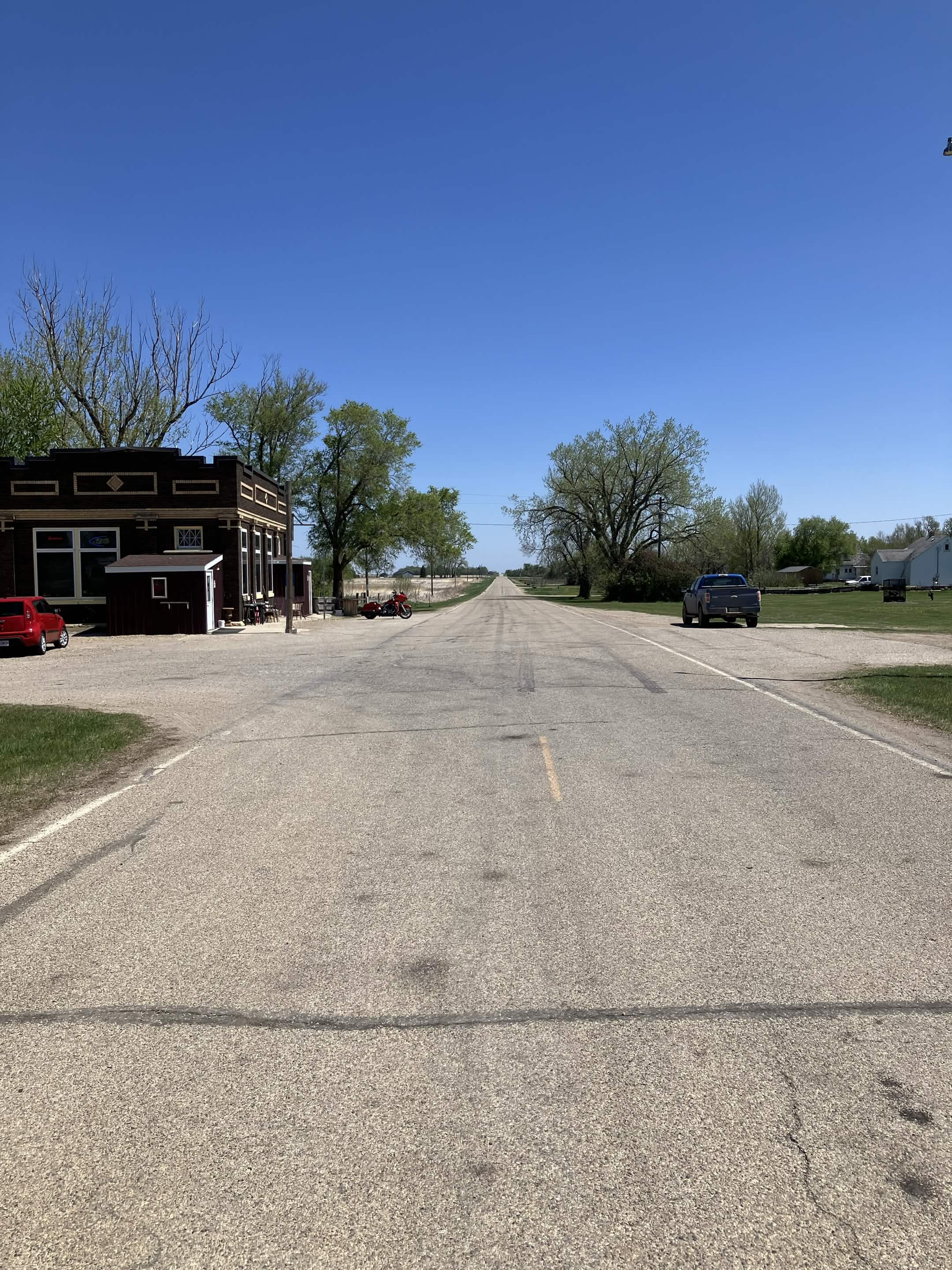

- Location within the state of North Dakota Stirum (the United States)
- Coordinates: 46°12′37″N 97°48′23″W
- Country: United States
- State: North Dakota
- County: Sargent
- Elevation: 1,355 ft (413 m)
- Time zone: UTC-6 (Central (CST))
  - Summer (DST): UTC-5 (CDT)
- ZIP codes: 58069
- Area code: 701
- GNIS feature ID: 1032325

Stirum is an unincorporated community in northwestern Sargent County, North Dakota, United States. It lies a short distance to the south of North Dakota Highway 13, northwest of the city of Forman, the county seat of Sargent County. Its elevation is 1,355 feet (413 m). It has a post office with the ZIP code 58069.
