= Great Bend, North Dakota =

- City
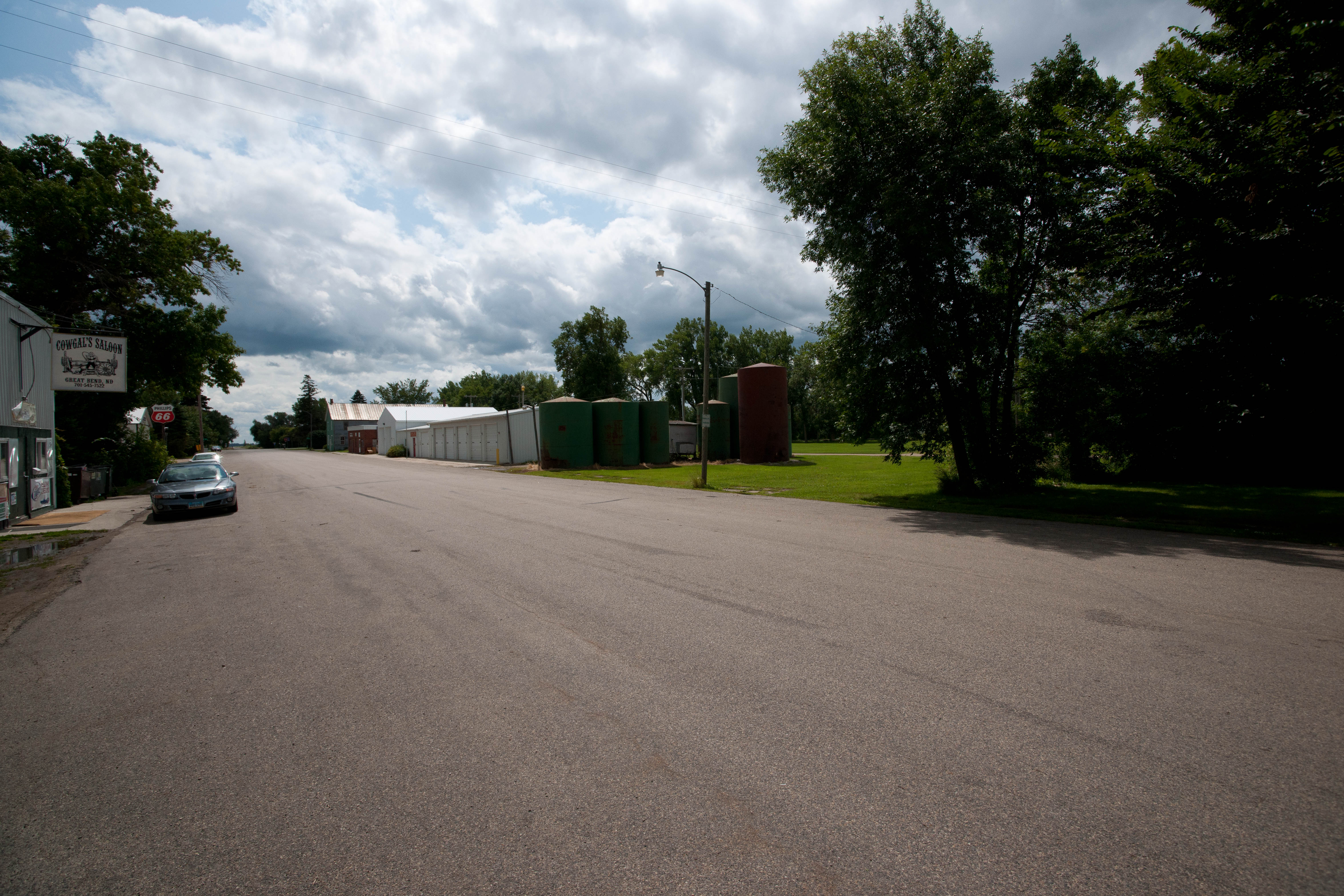
- Street in Great Bend

- Location of Great Bend, North Dakota
- Coordinates: 46°09′17″N 96°48′04″W
- Country: United States
- State: North Dakota
- County: Richland
- Founded: 1888
- Incorporated (village): 1908
- Incorporated (city): 1967
- Named for: Bend in the Wild Rice River

Area
  - Total: 0.56 sq mi (1.45 km^{2})
  - Land: 0.56 sq mi (1.45 km^{2})
  - Water: 0 sq mi (0.00 km^{2})
- Elevation: 974 ft (297 m)

Population (2020)
  - Total: 49
  - Estimate (2022): 52
  - Density: 87.4/sq mi (33.74/km^{2})
- Time zone: UTC-6 (Central (CST))
  - Summer (DST): UTC-5 (CDT)
- ZIP code: 58075
- Area code: 701
- FIPS code: 38-32900
- GNIS feature ID: 1036068

Great Bend is a city in Richland County, North Dakota, United States, on the banks of the Wild Rice River. Its population was 49 at the 2020 census. It was founded in 1888, and incorporated as a village in 1908. It is part of the Wahpeton, ND–MN Micropolitan Statistical Area.

== History ==
Great Bend was founded in 1888 on land homesteaded by George Worner (1855 – 1950), who was born in Germany and moved to Brandenburg Township in 1874 when his family moved there from Wisconsin. In 1875, Worner established a rural post office and named it Berlin after the German capital. The post office was moved closer to Great Bend in 1882, and disbanded on July 12, 1883. Worner, who was instrumental in the town's founding and development, served as one of the area's first station agents for the Northern Pacific Railroad, operated the town's first general store, and was one of its first postmasters. He later served in the North Dakota House of Representatives.

== Geography ==
According to the United States Census Bureau, it has a total area of 0.55 square miles (1.42 km^{2}), all land.

== Demographics ==
Historical population
Census	Pop.	Note	%±
1910	191		—
1920	142		−25.7%
1930	169		19.0%
1940	198		17.2%
1950	169		−14.6%
1960	164		−3.0%
1970	86		−47.6%
1980	113		31.4%
1990	108		−4.4%
2000	118		9.3%
2010	60		−49.2%
2020	49		−18.3%
2022 (est.)	52		6.1%
U.S. Decennial Census; 2020 Census

=== 2010 census ===
As of the census of 2010, there were 60 people, 29 households, and 17 families residing in the city. The population density was 109.1 inhabitants per square mile (42.1/km^{2}). There were 38 housing units at an average density of 69.1 per square mile (26.7/km^{2}). The racial makeup of the city was 100.0% White.

There were 29 households, of which 17.2% had children under the age of 18 living with them, 51.7% were married couples living together, 3.4% had a female householder with no husband present, 3.4% had a male householder with no wife present, and 41.4% were non-families. 34.5% of all households were made up of individuals, and 13.7% had someone living alone who was 65 years of age or older. The average household size was 2.07 and the average family size was 2.53.

The median age in the city was 52.5 years. 18.3% of residents were under the age of 18; 1.7% were between the ages of 18 and 24; 21.6% were from 25 to 44; 38.3% were from 45 to 64; and 20% were 65 years of age or older. The gender makeup of the city was 50.0% male and 50.0% female.

=== 2000 census ===
As of the census of 2000, there were 118 people, 40 households, and 33 families residing in the city. The population density was 207.6 inhabitants per square mile (80.2/km^{2}). There were 42 housing units at an average density of 73.9 per square mile (28.5/km^{2}). The racial makeup of the city was 100.00% White.

There were 40 households, out of which 42.5% had children under the age of 18 living with them, 72.5% were married couples living together, 5.0% had a female householder with no husband present, and 17.5% were non-families. 17.5% of all households were made up of individuals, and 2.5% had someone living alone who was 65 years of age or older. The average household size was 2.95 and the average family size was 3.33.

In the city, the population was spread out, with 32.2% under the age of 18, 7.6% from 18 to 24, 28.0% from 25 to 44, 16.9% from 45 to 64, and 15.3% who were 65 years of age or older. The median age was 36 years. For every 100 females, there were 114.5 males. For every 100 females age 18 and over, there were 122.2 males.

The median income for a household in the city was $63,333, and the median income for a family was $66,250. Males had a median income of $31,786 versus $33,750 for females. The per capita income for the city was $18,723. None of the population and none of the families were below the poverty line.

== Notable person ==
- George Worner (1855 – 1950), town founder, state Congressman (1925 – 1932)
