= De Lamere, North Dakota =

- Census-designated place & unincorporated community
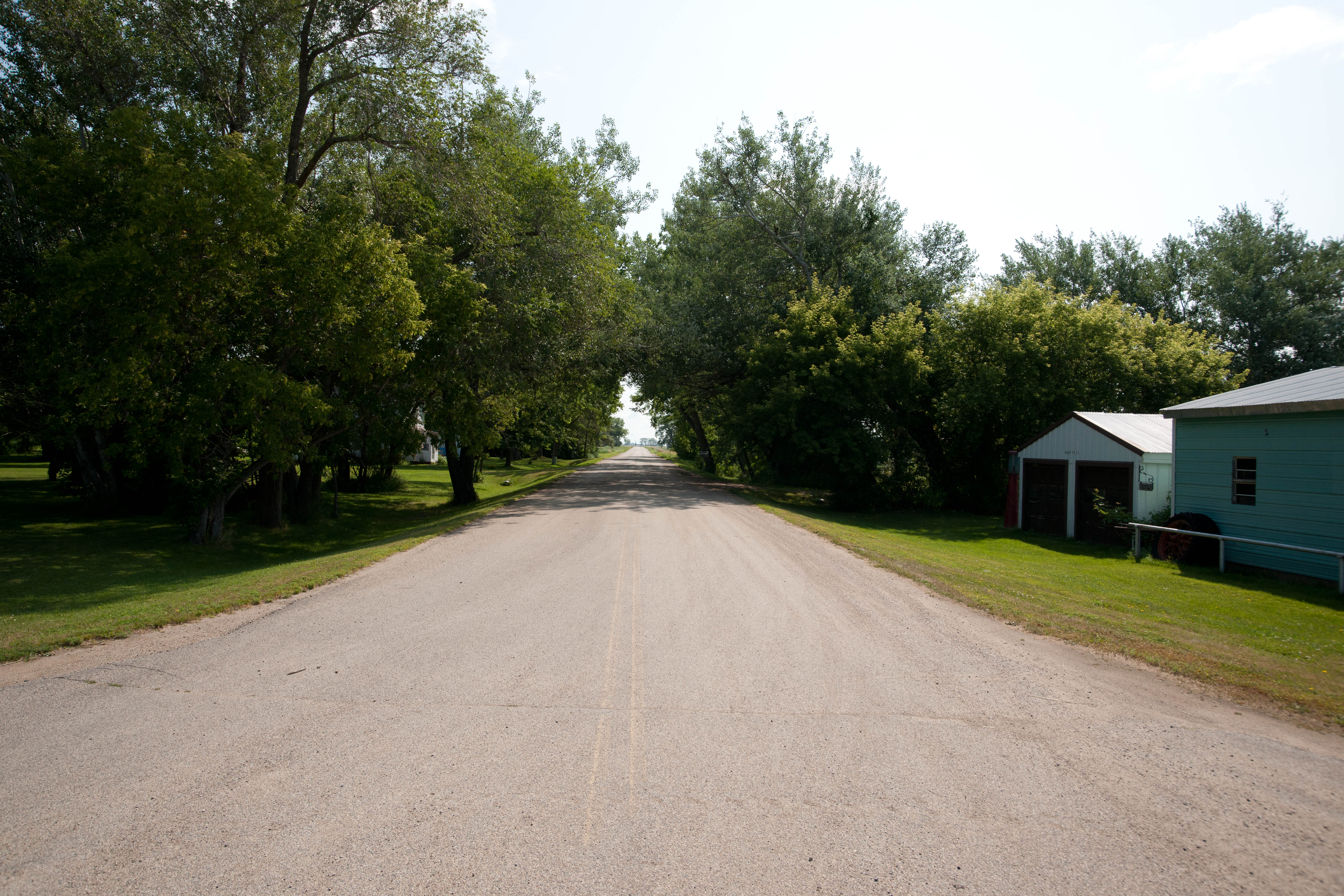
- Street in De Lamere

- Location within North Dakota
- Coordinates: 46°16′01″N 97°20′00″W
- Country: United States
- State: North Dakota
- County: Sargent

Area
  - Total: 0.26 sq mi (0.68 km^{2})
  - Land: 0.26 sq mi (0.68 km^{2})
  - Water: 0 sq mi (0.00 km^{2})
- Elevation: 1,066 ft (325 m)

Population (2020)
  - Total: 25
  - Density: 94.9/sq mi (36.65/km^{2})
- Time zone: UTC-6 (Central (CST))
  - Summer (DST): UTC-5 (CDT)
- Area code: 701
- GNIS feature ID: 2585497

De Lamere is a census-designated place and unincorporated community in Sargent County, North Dakota, United States. As of the 2020 census, De Lamere had a population of 25.

The town received its French name after an official with the Northern Pacific Railroad. The town was established in 1885 in Hall Township. It was and still is the only town in Hall Township.

At one time, the town had a train depot, church, school (DeLamere Dragons), general store, post office, grain elevators, blacksmith shop, pool hall, cream station, garages, and a town hall. The town also had its own newspaper (DeLamere Mistletoe.) and a bank (DeLamere State Bank).

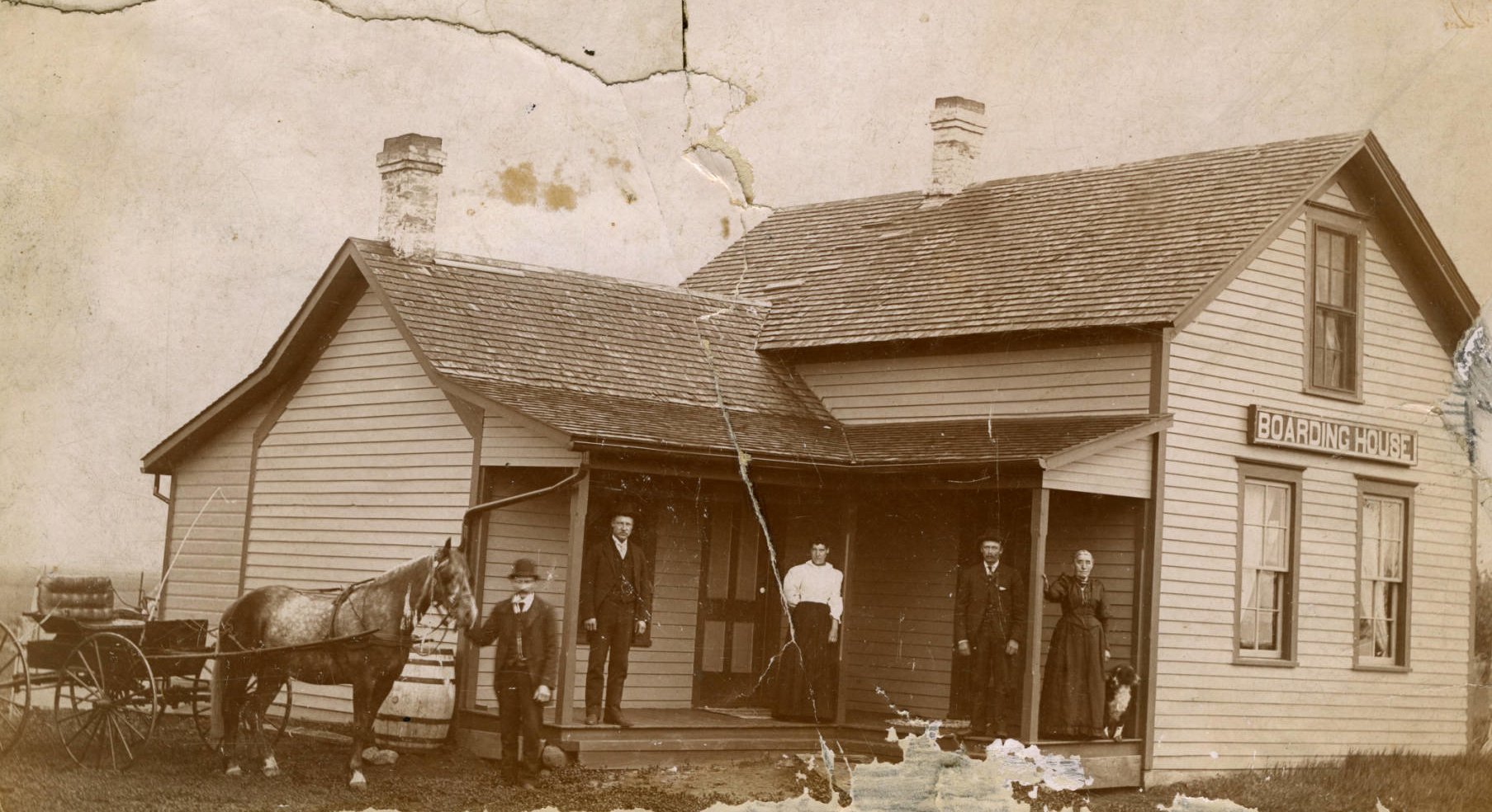
Boarding house in DeLamere, North Dakota, 1890s

== Demographics ==
Historical population
Census	Pop.	Note	%±
2020	25		—
U.S. Decennial Census
