= George Worner =

American politician

George Worner (1855–1950) was a public official in Richland County in the U.S. state of North Dakota. He served in the North Dakota House of Representatives from 1925 to 1932.

== Early life ==
George Worner was born in Germany on October 13, 1855. His father George (1828 – 1905) emigrated to the United States with the family, settling in Fond du Lac, Wisconsin. His mother died after they had arrived in Wisconsin. His father remarried and had three more sons. In 1874, the family moved to present day Richland County in Dakota Territory, homesteading near what is now the city of Great Bend. In 1879 married Augusta Brendel, a fellow German immigrant whose family had moved to the Dakota Territory from Iron Ridge, Wisconsin. George and Augusta had 8 children.

== Time in North Dakota ==
The Worner family settled in Brandenburg Township in Richland County. They established a post office on their homestead in 1875, and named it Berlin in honor of their homeland. The post office was moved in 1882 to a site closer to Great Bend, North Dakota, and was closed permanently on July 12, 1883.

George Worner was instrumental in the eventual establishment of Great Bend in 1888. Part of the city was platted on his homestead. Worner served as one of the first station agents in town for the Northern Pacific Railroad, operated the first general store, and served as one of the town's first postmasters. Worner reportedly hired future U.S. Senator Porter J. McCumber to work on his farm.

== Political career ==
Worner was also active politically. He served in county government as one of Richland County's commissioners. He was elected in 1924 to the North Dakota House of Representatives, and served from 1925 to 1932. Senator McCumber reportedly offered him the position of U.S. Marshall for North Dakota, but Worner declined.
