= Sargent County, North Dakota =

County in North Dakota, United States

- County
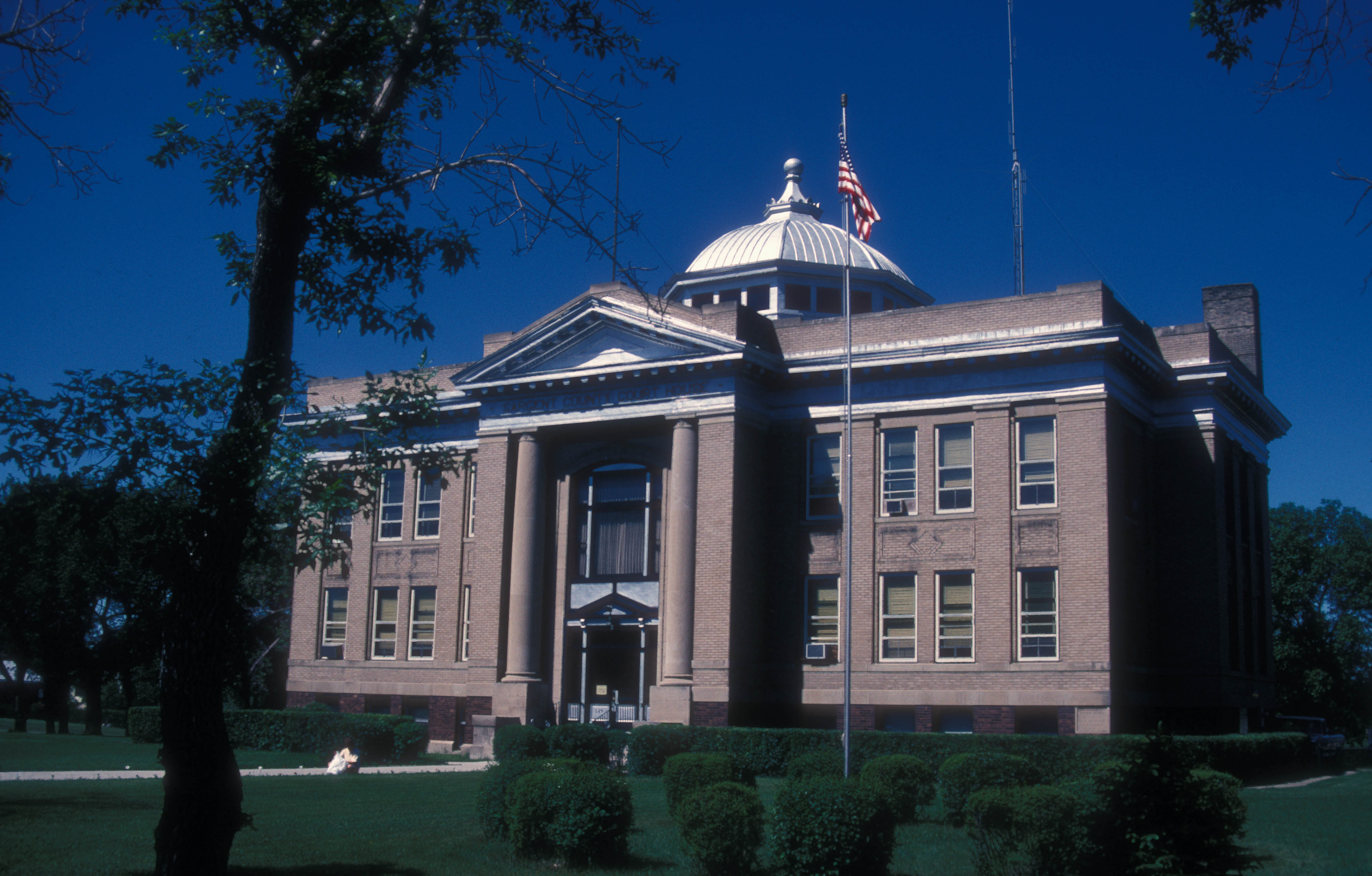
- The Sargent County Courthouse in Forman

- Location within the U.S. state of North Dakota
- Coordinates: 46.108204°N 97.630051°W
- Country: United States
- State: North Dakota
- Founded: April 9, 1883 (created); October 8, 1883 (organized)
- Named for: H. E. Sargent
- Seat: Forman
- Largest city: Gwinner

Area
  - Total: 866.874 sq mi (2,245.19 km^{2})
  - Land: 858.483 sq mi (2,223.46 km^{2})
  - Water: 8.391 sq mi (21.73 km^{2}) 0.97%

Population (2020)
  - Total: 3,862
  - Estimate (2025): 3,711 ▼
  - Density: 4.323/sq mi (1.669/km^{2})
- Time zone: UTC−6 (Central)
  - Summer (DST): UTC−5 (CDT)
- Area code: 701
- Congressional district: At-large
- Website: sargentnd.com

Sargent County is a county in the U.S. state of North Dakota. As of the 2020 census, the population was 3,862, and was estimated to be 3,711 in 2025. The county seat is Forman and the largest city is Gwinner. The county is named in honor of Homer E. Sargent, a 19th-century general manager of the Northern Pacific Railroad Company. The county spans an agricultural region between the James River and Red River valleys in southeastern North Dakota dotted with various sloughs, lakes, and hills. The original home of the Bobcat Company, a manufacturer of farm and construction equipment that still produces a large number of skid-steer loaders at its facility in Gwinner.

== History ==
The Dakota Territory created the county on April 9, 1883, with areas partitioned from Ransom County, from previously unorganized areas and from non-county areas in the Wahpeton and Sisseton Indian Reserve. It was named for H. E. Sargent, a railroad executive. Its governing structure was not completed at that time, so it was attached to Richland for judicial purposes and to Ransom for administrative purposes. This arrangement only lasted until October 8, when the county government was effected, with Milnor as the county seat. However, in 1884, in the county's first election, Forman was chosen as the county seat.

The Northern Pacific Railway laid a line into the county in 1883, reaching Milnor. By 1900 it had been extended across the county. The county's population rapidly increased, reaching a peak in the 1920 United States census (9,655).

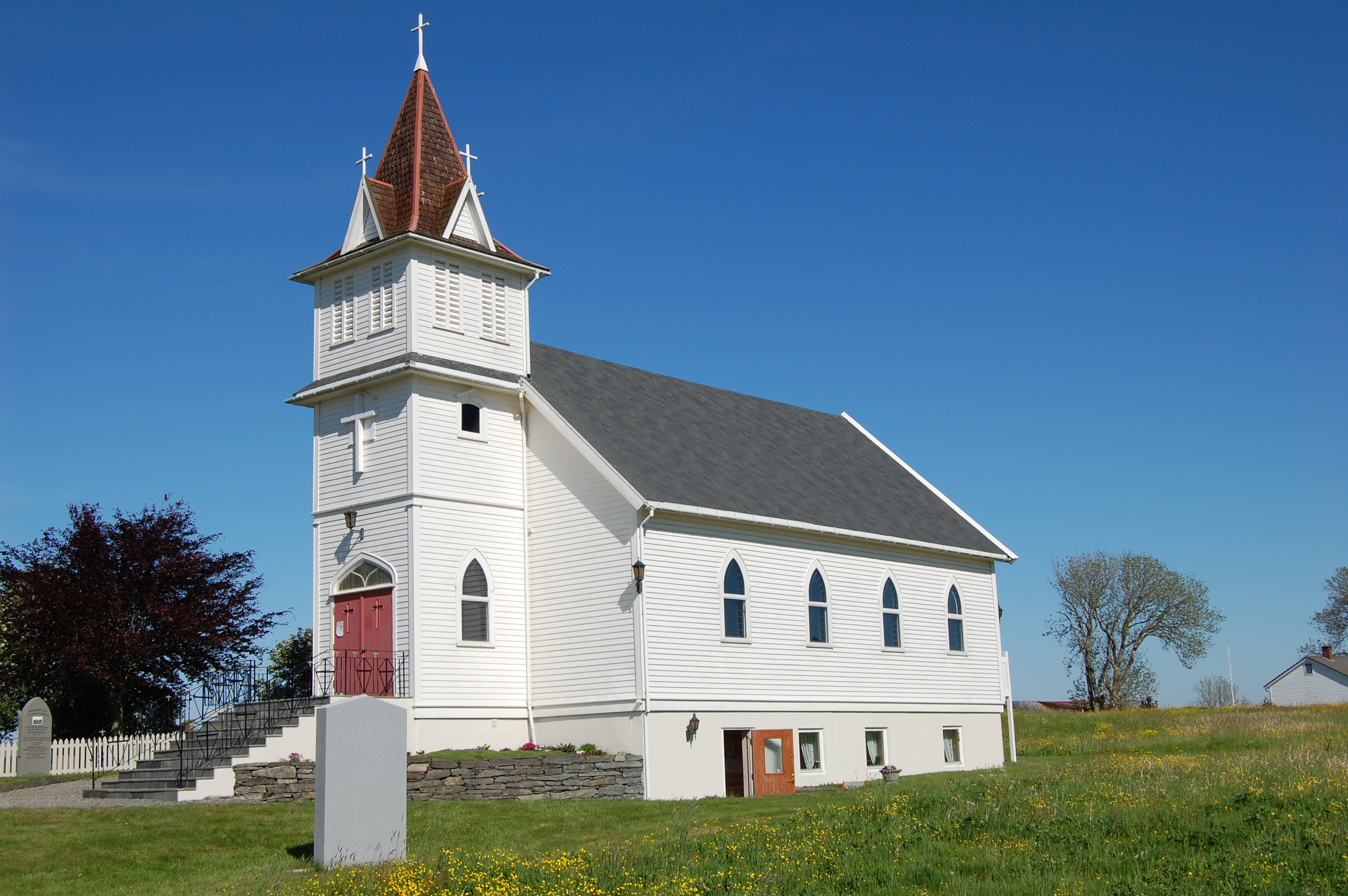
The former Brampton Lutheran Church, moved to Norway in 1997

In 1997 the Brampton Lutheran Church (originally built in 1908) was moved to Sletta on the island of Radøy in Alver Municipality, Norway and it was reconstructed there. It is now called the Emigrant Church (Norwegian: Emigrantkirka).

The Sargent County Courthouse, a Beaux Arts-style building built in 1910, is listed on the U.S. National Register of Historic Places.

== Geography ==
Soils of Sargent County

Sargent County lies near the southeastern corner of North Dakota, abutting the state's southern border with South Dakota. The county is almost exactly rectangular in shape (consisting of 24 sections of land), with a small protrusion in the county's southeastern corner for alignment with the boundaries of the Lake Traverse Indian Reservation.

According to the United States Census Bureau, the county has a total area of 866.874 square miles (2,245.19 km^{2}), of which 858.483 square miles (2,223.46 km^{2}) is land and 8.391 square miles (21.73 km^{2}) (0.97%) is water. It is the 48th largest county in North Dakota by total area.

Other than small portions of the western and northern sides of the county that lie in the James River and Sheyenne River watersheds, respectively, the vast majority of the county lies within the watershed of the Wild Rice River, whose source is the termination of a drainage ditch about two miles northeast of Brampton in southwestern Sargent County. It flows generally easterly through the southern part of the county, passing through Silver Lake and Lake Tewaukon before flowing further east into Richland County about five miles southeast of De Lamere.

The county's topography is varied, with the southern and western portions of the county being dominated by glacial hills, including the northern tip of the Coteau des Prairies standing prominently along the county's southern border, gradually transitioning into the much flatter landscape of the Red River Valley in the eastern portion of the county. The flatter areas of the county are largely devoted to the production of corn, soybean, and wheat, with much of the more hilly terrain being used as pastures for grazing livestock. The terrain generally slopes to the south and east, with its highest point on its western boundary line at 1,365 ft (416 m) ASL, although a northwest–southeast rise on the eastern portion of its south boundary line rises to 1,729 ft (527 m) ASL.

Sargent County is located within the Prairie Pothole Region of the northern Great Plains, and as such has a landscape that is covered in numerous wetlands. The majority of these wetlands are shallow sloughs that vary in size in wetter and drier years, but there are also a number of larger and deeper lakes. Lake Tewaukon, located within Tewaukon National Wildlife Refuge in the southeastern portion of the county, is one of the county's largest lakes. Meanwhile, the western end of the county contains a chain of lakes, the largest of which is Kraft Lake. Many of the county's lakes are populated with fish such as yellow perch and walleye, making fishing (including ice fishing in the winter months) a popular recreation for both locals and visitors to the county.

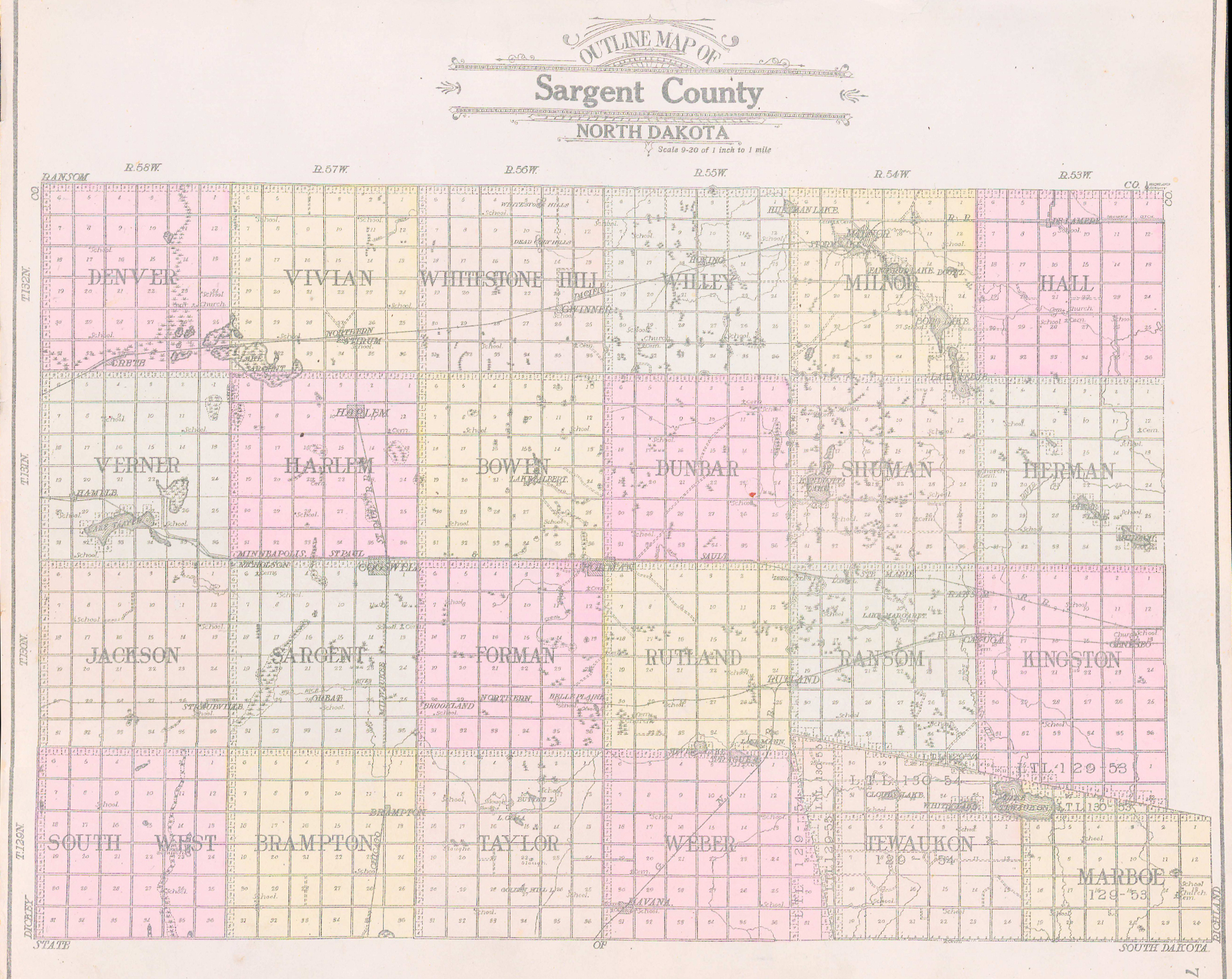
Outline map of Sargent County, North Dakota, 1909

=== Adjacent counties ===
- Ransom County to the north
- Richland County to the east
- Roberts County, South Dakota to the southeast
- Marshall County, South Dakota to the south
- Brown County, South Dakota to the southwest
- Dickey County to the west

=== National protected areas ===
- Storm Lake National Wildlife Refuge
- Tewaukon National Wildlife Refuge
- Wild Rice Lake National Wildlife Refuge

=== Lakes ===
- Alkali Lake
- Borg Lake
- Buffalo Lake
- Clouds Lake
- Golden Hill Lake
- Kraft Lake
- Lake Dell
- Lake Fedge
- Lake Tewaukon
- Pickell Lake
- Silver Lake
- Sprague Lake
- Storm Lake
- White Lake

== Demographics ==
Historical population
Census	Pop.	Note	%±
1890	5,076		—
1900	6,039		19.0%
1910	9,202		52.4%
1920	9,655		4.9%
1930	9,298		−3.7%
1940	8,693		−6.5%
1950	7,616		−12.4%
1960	6,856		−10.0%
1970	5,937		−13.4%
1980	5,512		−7.2%
1990	4,549		−17.5%
2000	4,366		−4.0%
2010	3,829		−12.3%
2020	3,862		0.9%
2025 (est.)	3,711	▼	−3.9%
U.S. Decennial Census; 1790–1960 1900–1990; 1990–2000 2010–2020

As of the fourth quarter of 2024, the median home value in Sargent County was $158,509.

=== 2020 census ===
As of the 2020 census, the county had a population of 3,862. Of the residents, 20.8% were under the age of 18 and 22.4% were 65 years of age or older; the median age was 44.8 years. For every 100 females there were 118.4 males, and for every 100 females age 18 and over there were 122.2 males.

The racial makeup of the county was 93.2% White, 1.3% Black or African American, 0.3% American Indian and Alaska Native, 0.4% Asian, 0.7% from some other race, and 4.1% from two or more races. Hispanic or Latino residents of any race comprised 2.4% of the population.

There were 1,734 households in the county, of which 24.3% had children under the age of 18 living with them and 16.7% had a female householder with no spouse or partner present. About 32.1% of all households were made up of individuals and 12.4% had someone living alone who was 65 years of age or older.

There were 1,999 housing units, of which 13.3% were vacant. Among occupied housing units, 75.7% were owner-occupied and 24.3% were renter-occupied. The homeowner vacancy rate was 1.6% and the rental vacancy rate was 15.7%.

=== 2010 census ===
As of the 2010 census, there were 3,829 people, 1,675 households and 1,113 families residing in the county. The population density was 4.46 inhabitants per square mile (1.7/km^{2}). There were 2,004 housing units at an average density of 2.33 per square mile (0.9/km^{2}). The racial makeup of the county was 98.02% White, 0.05% African American, 0.52% Native American, 0.24% Asian, 0.10% Pacific Islander, 0.34% from some other races and 0.73% from two or more races. Hispanic or Latino people of any race were 1.33% of the population.

In terms of ancestry, 51.3% were German, 35.9% were Norwegian, 11.8% were Swedish, 8.4% were Irish, and 3.0% were American.

There were 1,675 households, 27.1% had children under the age of 18 living with them, 57.3% were married couples living together, 4.7% had a female householder with no husband present, 33.6% were non-families, and 30.2% of all households were made up of individuals. The average household size was 2.26 and the average family size was 2.79. The median age was 45.9 years.

The median income for a household in the county was $49,318 and the median income for a family was $59,531. Males had a median income of $43,594 versus $30,152 for females. The per capita income for the county was $26,553. About 5.7% of families and 7.8% of the population were below the poverty line, including 10.5% of those under age 18 and 10.4% of those age 65 or over.

== Law and government ==
=== Commissioners ===
Sargent County is governed by an elected and nonpartisan board of commissioners, each of which is elected at-large.

Commissioner	In office since	Current term expires in December
Jason Arth	2016	2024
Lyle Bopp	2018	2022
Mark Breker	2020	2024
Richard Ruch	2018	2022
Scott Johnson	2022	2022

== Transportation ==
=== Major highways ===
- North Dakota Highway 11
- North Dakota Highway 13
- North Dakota Highway 32

== Communities ==
=== Cities ===
- Cayuga
- Cogswell
- Forman (county seat)
- Gwinner
- Havana
- Milnor
- Rutland

=== Census-designated place ===
- De Lamere

=== Unincorporated communities ===
- Cogswell
- Crete
- Stirum
- Straubville

=== Townships ===
- Bowen
- Brampton
- Denver
- Dunbar
- Forman
- Hall
- Harlem
- Herman
- Jackson
- Kingston
- Marboe
- Milnor
- Ransom
- Rutland
- Sargent
- Shuman
- Southwest
- Taylor
- Tewaukon
- Verner
- Vivian
- Weber
- Whitestone Hill
- Willey

== Politics ==
Sargent County is a swing county in presidential elections, having voted for both parties an equal number of times since 1980. From 1948 on, it has backed the national winner in every presidential election except for 1988, when a majority of the county's votes went to Democrat Michael Dukakis, and 2020, when a majority of the county's residents voted for Republican Donald Trump in his bid for reelection.

United States presidential election results for Sargent County, North Dakota
Year	Republican		Democratic		Third party(ies)	
Year	No.	%	No.	%	No.	%
1900	765	56.25%	564	41.47%	31	2.28%
1904	1,045	71.62%	310	21.25%	104	7.13%
1908	1,012	61.48%	576	34.99%	58	3.52%
1912	605	37.00%	641	39.20%	389	23.79%
1916	1,050	52.61%	868	43.49%	78	3.91%
1920	2,787	78.18%	673	18.88%	105	2.95%
1924	1,468	43.68%	232	6.90%	1,661	49.42%
1928	1,772	46.88%	1,989	52.62%	19	0.50%
1932	785	21.16%	2,818	75.98%	106	2.86%
1936	863	24.13%	2,306	64.47%	408	11.41%
1940	1,922	50.01%	1,894	49.28%	27	0.70%
1944	1,488	50.72%	1,426	48.60%	20	0.68%
1948	1,387	45.73%	1,506	49.65%	140	4.62%
1952	2,124	65.76%	1,090	33.75%	16	0.50%
1956	1,662	52.90%	1,473	46.88%	7	0.22%
1960	1,591	48.98%	1,655	50.95%	2	0.06%
1964	1,189	39.20%	1,840	60.67%	4	0.13%
1968	1,386	48.65%	1,308	45.91%	155	5.44%
1972	1,616	54.48%	1,331	44.88%	19	0.64%
1976	1,344	44.34%	1,644	54.24%	43	1.42%
1980	1,565	55.44%	1,048	37.12%	210	7.44%
1984	1,385	50.83%	1,295	47.52%	45	1.65%
1988	1,119	45.94%	1,306	53.61%	11	0.45%
1992	816	36.20%	961	42.64%	477	21.16%
1996	814	39.38%	1,003	48.52%	250	12.09%
2000	1,103	50.50%	959	43.91%	122	5.59%
2004	1,147	52.14%	1,021	46.41%	32	1.45%
2008	778	40.37%	1,115	57.86%	34	1.76%
2012	879	43.80%	1,075	53.56%	53	2.64%
2016	1,088	54.48%	694	34.75%	215	10.77%
2020	1,266	61.16%	738	35.65%	66	3.19%
2024	1,325	64.86%	663	32.45%	55	2.69%

== See also ==
- National Register of Historic Places listings in Sargent County, North Dakota
