= Brandenburg Township, Richland County, North Dakota =

Brandenburg Township
- Township
- Location within the state of North Dakota
- Coordinates: 46°08′45″N 96°48′49″W
- Country: United States
- State: North Dakota
- County: Richland
- Settled: c. 1875

Area
  - Total: 35.28 sq mi (91.4 km^{2})
  - Land: 35.28 sq mi (91.4 km^{2})
  - Water: 0 sq mi (0 km^{2})
- Elevation: 978 ft (298 m)

Population
  - Total: 101
  - Density: 2.86/sq mi (1.11/km^{2})
- Time zone: UTC-6 (Central (CST))
  - Summer (DST): UTC-5 (CDT)
- Area code: 701
- FIPS code: 38-09020
- GNIS feature ID: 1036828

Brandenburg Township is a civil township located in Richland County, North Dakota, United States. Its population during the 2020 Census was 101.

== History ==
Brandenburg Township was first settled in the mid-1870s by German immigrants, who originally named it Berlin.

The original name came from George Worner (1855 – 1950), an early settler, who in 1875 established a rural post office on his homestead, and named it Berlin in honor of Berlin, Germany. Worner was born in Germany, and his family emigrated to the United States, settling in Wisconsin before moving to Dakota Territory around 1874. The Berlin post office was later moved in 1882 to a site near present-day Great Bend, North Dakota, and was closed permanently on July 12, 1883. Part of Great Bend was platted on Worner's homestead, and he instrumental in the city's development. Worner later served as county commissioner and in the North Dakota House of Representatives from 1925 to 1932.

The township had been renamed Brandenburg by the time the 1890 Census was conducted. It reached a peak population of 552 people in 1900. Much of that population was absorbed into the city of Great Bend when it was incorporated in 1908 and became independent of the township.

== Demographics ==
The 2000 Census reported 142 people, 44 households, and 31 families in the township. The population density was 4.0 per square mile (1.5/km^{2}). There were 61 housing units at an average density of 1.4 per square mile (0.54/km^{2}). The racial makeup of the city was 98.6% White, with 1.4% of the population reporting two or more races. Those that reported having German ancestry were nearly 80% of the population, reflecting the influence early German settlers had on the township.

Historical population
Census	Pop.	Note	%±
1890	422		—
1900	552		30.8%
1910	369		−33.2%
1920	352		−4.6%
1930	372		5.7%
1940	332		−10.8%
1950	268		−19.3%
1960	248		−7.5%
1970	206		−16.9%
1980	160		−22.3%
1990	127		−20.6%
2000	142		11.8%
2009 (est.)	126
U.S. Census Bureau

Of the township's 44 households, 47.7% had children under the age of 18 living with them. 63.6% of households were made up of married couples living together, and 29.5% were non-family households. The average household size was 3.23 and the average family size was 4.06.

Brandenburg has a relatively young population, with a median age of 29.5 years. Roughly 73% of the population under the age of 45 in the year 2000. Those under the age of 18 made up the largest subsection of the population (43.7%), followed by 25- to 44-year-olds (29.6%) and 45- to 64-year-olds (16.2%). Just 6.3% of the population was over the age of 65.

The median income for a household in the city was $51,458, and the median income for a family was $51,667. Males had a median income of $37,188 versus $20,000 for females. The per capita income for the city was $20,330. About 6.0% of families and 7.0% of the population were below the poverty line, including 10.6% of those under the age of eighteen and none of those sixty five or over.
