= Tewaukon National Wildlife Refuge =

Protected area in North Dakota, United States

- IUCN category IV (habitat/species management area)
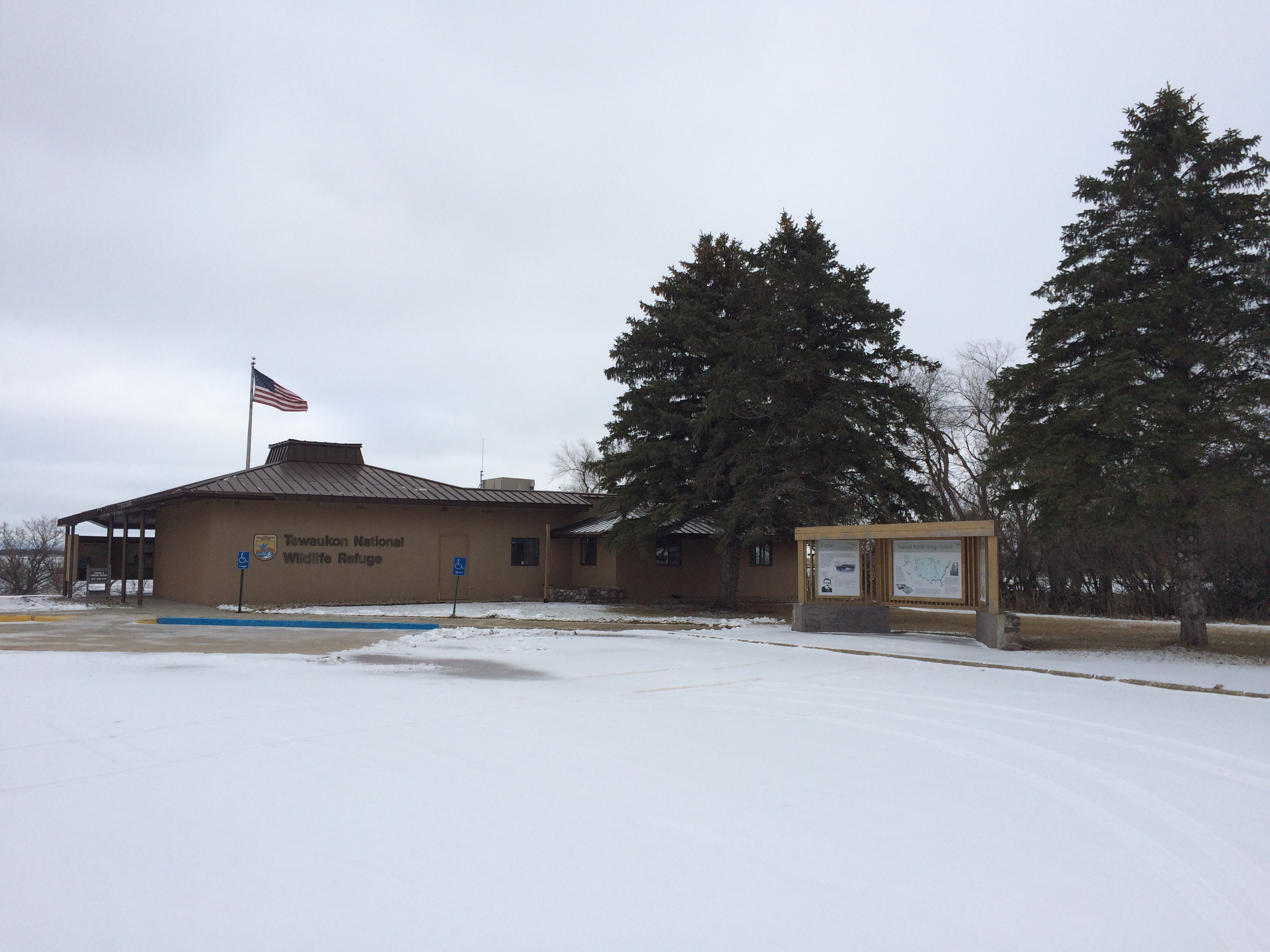
- Visitor Center

- Location within the United States
- Location: Sargent County, North Dakota, United States
- Nearest city: Cayuga, North Dakota
- Coordinates: 46.00412°N 97.38509°W
- Area: 8,363 acres (33.84 km^{2})
- Established: 1945
- Governing body: U.S. Fish and Wildlife Service
- Website: Tewaukon National Wildlife Refuge

Tewaukon National Wildlife Refuge is located in southeastern North Dakota along the western edge of the northern tallgrass prairie, about 5 miles (8.0 km) south of Cayuga, in Sargent County. The Wild Rice River flows through the Refuge and then into Lake Tewaukon. Established in 1945, the 8,363-acre (33.84 km^{2}) Refuge is located in the Prairie Pothole Region, one of the most biologically productive areas on earth. It lies within the Tewaukon Wetland Management District.
