= Brampton Township, Sargent County, North Dakota =

Brampton Township, North Dakota
- Township
- Location within the state of North Dakota
- Coordinates: 45°58′44″N 97°48′37″W
- Country: United States
- State: North Dakota
- County: Sargent

Area
  - Total: 36.3 sq mi (94.0 km^{2})
  - Land: 36.3 sq mi (93.9 km^{2})
  - Water: 0.039 sq mi (0.1 km^{2})
- Elevation: 1,306 ft (398 m)

Population (2000)
  - Total: 66
  - Density: 1.8/sq mi (0.7/km^{2})
- Time zone: UTC-6 (Central (CST))
  - Summer (DST): UTC-5 (CDT)
- ZIP code: 58017
- Area code: 701
- FIPS code: 38-08980
- GNIS feature ID: 1036788

Brampton Township is a civil township in Sargent County, North Dakota, United States.

== History ==
It is named after Brampton, which is the only organized community within the township's boundaries.

Brampton Cemetery is outside the city limits.

Of the Township's 66 residents, 61 are white, four are Native, and one is "two or more races".
