= Havana, North Dakota =

Havana
- City
- Location of Havana, North Dakota
- Coordinates: 45°57′06″N 97°37′06″W
- Country: United States
- State: North Dakota
- County: Sargent
- Founded: 1887

Area
  - Total: 0.38 sq mi (0.98 km^{2})
  - Land: 0.38 sq mi (0.98 km^{2})
  - Water: 0 sq mi (0.00 km^{2})
- Elevation: 1,293 ft (394 m)

Population (2020)
  - Total: 67
  - Estimate (2022): 68
  - Density: 177.5/sq mi (68.52/km^{2})
- Time zone: UTC–6 (Central (CST))
  - Summer (DST): UTC–5 (CDT)
- ZIP code: 58043
- Area code: 701
- FIPS code: 38-36140
- GNIS feature ID: 1036086

Havana is a city in Sargent County, North Dakota, United States. The population was 67 at the 2020 census. Havana was founded in 1887.

== Geography ==
According to the United States Census Bureau, the city has a total area of 0.38 square miles (0.98 km^{2}), all land.

== Demographics ==
Historical population
Census	Pop.	Note	%±
1910	387		—
1920	319		−17.6%
1930	271		−15.0%
1940	305		12.5%
1950	267		−12.5%
1960	206		−22.8%
1970	156		−24.3%
1980	148		−5.1%
1990	124		−16.2%
2000	94		−24.2%
2010	71		−24.5%
2020	67		−5.6%
2022 (est.)	68		1.5%
U.S. Decennial Census; 2020 Census

=== 2010 census ===
As of the census of 2010, there were 71 people, 35 households, and 22 families residing in the city. The population density was 186.8 inhabitants per square mile (72.1/km^{2}). There were 47 housing units at an average density of 123.7 per square mile (47.8/km^{2}). The racial makeup of the city was 97.2% White and 2.8% from two or more races. Hispanic or Latino of any race were 1.4% of the population.

There were 35 households, of which 22.9% had children under the age of 18 living with them, 54.3% were married couples living together, 5.7% had a female householder with no husband present, 2.9% had a male householder with no wife present, and 37.1% were non-families. 37.1% of all households were made up of individuals, and 5.7% had someone living alone who was 65 years of age or older. The average household size was 2.03 and the average family size was 2.59.

The median age in the city was 50.5 years. 16.9% of residents were under the age of 18; 7% were between the ages of 18 and 24; 21% were from 25 to 44; 23.9% were from 45 to 64; and 31% were 65 years of age or older. The gender makeup of the city was 53.5% male and 46.5% female.

=== 2000 census ===
As of the census of 2000, there were 94 people, 43 households, and 31 families residing in the city. The population density was 252.0 inhabitants per square mile (97.3/km^{2}). There were 51 housing units at an average density of 136.7 per square mile (52.8/km^{2}). The racial makeup of the city was 100.00% White.

There were 43 households, out of which 20.9% had children under the age of 18 living with them, 60.5% were married couples living together, 7.0% had a female householder with no husband present, and 25.6% were non-families. 25.6% of all households were made up of individuals, and 11.6% had someone living alone who was 65 years of age or older. The average household size was 2.19 and the average family size was 2.59.

In the city, the population was spread out, with 22.3% under the age of 18, 5.3% from 18 to 24, 22.3% from 25 to 44, 29.8% from 45 to 64, and 20.2% who were 65 years of age or older. The median age was 45 years.

The median income for a household in the city was $34,583, and the median income for a family was $37,500. Males had a median income of $28,750 versus $21,875 for females. The per capita income for the city was $18,779. None of the population and none of the families were below the poverty line.

== Climate ==
This climatic region is typified by large seasonal temperature differences, with warm to hot (and often humid) summers and cold (sometimes severely cold) winters. According to the Köppen Climate Classification system, Havana has a humid continental climate, abbreviated "Dfb" on climate maps.
