= Forman, North Dakota =

- City
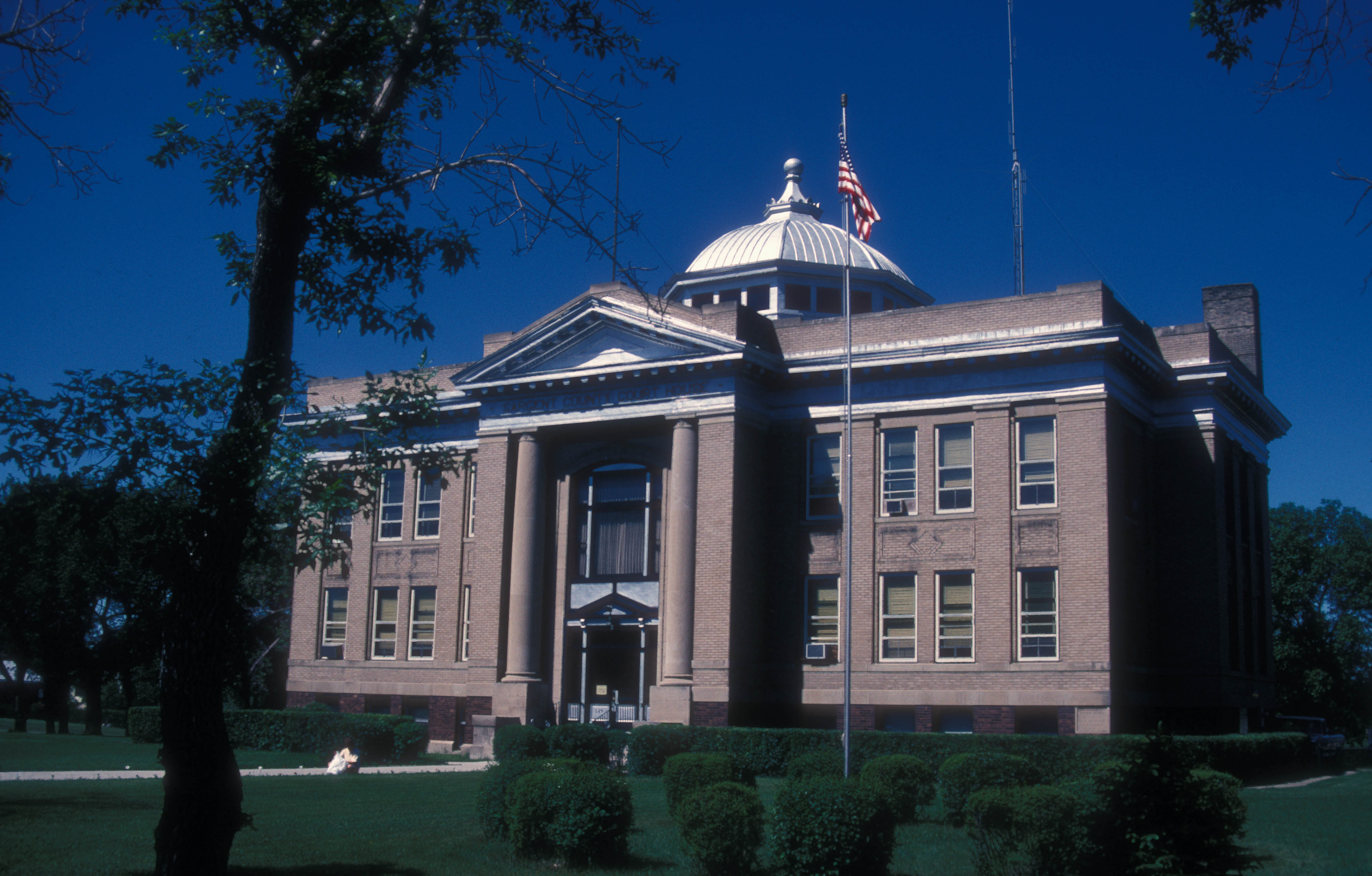
- County Courthouse

- Logo
- Motto: "A Forever Hometown"
- Location of Forman, North Dakota
- Coordinates: 46°06′14″N 97°38′13″W
- Country: United States
- State: North Dakota
- County: Sargent
- Founded: 1883

Area
  - Total: 0.79 sq mi (2.04 km^{2})
  - Land: 0.78 sq mi (2.02 km^{2})
  - Water: 0.0077 sq mi (0.02 km^{2})
- Elevation: 1,257 ft (383 m)

Population (2020)
  - Total: 509
  - Estimate (2022): 493
  - Density: 653.5/sq mi (252.33/km^{2})
- Time zone: UTC-6 (Central (CST))
  - Summer (DST): UTC-5 (CDT)
- ZIP code: 58032
- Area code: 701
- FIPS code: 38-27260
- GNIS feature ID: 1036039
- Website: formannd.com

Forman is a city in and the county seat of Sargent County, North Dakota, United States. The population was 509 at the 2020 census. Forman was founded in 1883.

== History ==
Forman was founded in 1883 by Cornelius Forman. In 1886, the county seat was transferred to Forman from Milnor.

Until 1967, Forman was the only town in North Dakota, as all other incorporated communities were either villages or cities. It had become so by a special legal process. In that year it became a city, because the state legislature declared that all incorporated communities were to be cities without distinction of rank.

== Geography and climate ==
Forman surrounds a body of water known as Lake Lithia.

According to the United States Census Bureau, the city has a total area of 0.71 square miles (1.84 km^{2}), of which 0.70 square miles (1.81 km^{2}) is land and 0.01 square miles (0.03 km^{2}) is water.

Climate data for Forman 5 SSE, North Dakota (1991–2020 normals, extremes 1893–present)
Month	Jan	Feb	Mar	Apr	May	Jun	Jul	Aug	Sep	Oct	Nov	Dec	Year
Record high °F (°C)	65 (18)	67 (19)	84 (29)	99 (37)	103 (39)	105 (41)	110 (43)	107 (42)	102 (39)	97 (36)	82 (28)	64 (18)	110 (43)
Mean daily maximum °F (°C)	18.3 (−7.6)	23.2 (−4.9)	36.5 (2.5)	52.9 (11.6)	66.4 (19.1)	75.9 (24.4)	81.0 (27.2)	79.7 (26.5)	71.4 (21.9)	55.7 (13.2)	38.4 (3.6)	24.6 (−4.1)	52.0 (11.1)
Daily mean °F (°C)	8.9 (−12.8)	13.3 (−10.4)	26.5 (−3.1)	41.8 (5.4)	55.2 (12.9)	65.4 (18.6)	70.2 (21.2)	68.1 (20.1)	59.1 (15.1)	44.6 (7.0)	29.0 (−1.7)	15.8 (−9.0)	41.5 (5.3)
Mean daily minimum °F (°C)	−0.6 (−18.1)	3.4 (−15.9)	16.5 (−8.6)	30.7 (−0.7)	43.9 (6.6)	55.0 (12.8)	59.3 (15.2)	56.5 (13.6)	46.8 (8.2)	33.5 (0.8)	19.6 (−6.9)	7.1 (−13.8)	31.0 (−0.6)
Record low °F (°C)	−45 (−43)	−53 (−47)	−34 (−37)	−5 (−21)	4 (−16)	24 (−4)	28 (−2)	29 (−2)	11 (−12)	−6 (−21)	−28 (−33)	−36 (−38)	−53 (−47)
Average precipitation inches (mm)	0.67 (17)	0.52 (13)	0.96 (24)	1.85 (47)	2.83 (72)	4.31 (109)	3.60 (91)	2.21 (56)	2.53 (64)	2.23 (57)	0.82 (21)	0.64 (16)	23.17 (589)
Average precipitation days (≥ 0.01 in)	5.3	5.5	4.9	6.2	9.4	10.3	9.3	7.6	7.3	6.8	4.7	6.3	83.6
Source: NOAA

== Demographics ==
Historical population
Census	Pop.	Note	%±
1890	178		—
1900	257		44.4%
1910	352		37.0%
1920	402		14.2%
1930	386		−4.0%
1940	500		29.5%
1950	466		−6.8%
1960	530		13.7%
1970	596		12.5%
1980	629		5.5%
1990	586		−6.8%
2000	506		−13.7%
2010	504		−0.4%
2020	509		1.0%
2022 (est.)	493		−3.1%
U.S. Decennial Census; 2020 Census

=== 2010 census ===
As of the census of 2010, there were 504 people, 222 households, and 123 families residing in the city. The population density was 720.0 inhabitants per square mile (278.0/km^{2}). There were 255 housing units at an average density of 364.3 per square mile (140.7/km^{2}). The racial makeup of the city was 98.6% White, 0.2% African American, 0.2% Native American, 0.2% Pacific Islander, 0.4% from other races, and 0.4% from two or more races. Hispanic or Latino of any race were 1.2% of the population.

There were 222 households, of which 23.9% had children under the age of 18 living with them, 48.6% were married couples living together, 4.1% had a female householder with no husband present, 2.7% had a male householder with no wife present, and 44.6% were non-families. 41.9% of all households were made up of individuals, and 25.2% had someone living alone who was 65 years of age or older. The average household size was 2.10 and the average family size was 2.87.

The median age in the city was 46.8 years. 22% of residents were under the age of 18; 4.2% were between the ages of 18 and 24; 22.7% were from 25 to 44; 24.5% were from 45 to 64; and 26.8% were 65 years of age or older. The gender makeup of the city was 50.8% male and 49.2% female.

=== 2000 census ===
As of the census of 2000, there were 506 people, 221 households, and 129 families residing in the city. The population density was 719.2 inhabitants per square mile (277.7/km^{2}). There were 256 housing units at an average density of 363.8 per square mile (140.5/km^{2}). The racial makeup of the city was 97.63% White, 0.20% African American, 1.38% from other races, and 0.79% from two or more races. Hispanic or Latino of any race were 1.38% of the population.

There were 221 households, out of which 24.9% had children under the age of 18 living with them, 50.7% were married couples living together, 2.7% had a female householder with no husband present, and 41.6% were non-families. 39.4% of all households were made up of individuals, and 22.2% had someone living alone who was 65 years of age or older. The average household size was 2.16 and the average family size was 2.91.

In the city, the population was spread out, with 20.9% under the age of 18, 5.5% from 18 to 24, 20.8% from 25 to 44, 27.7% from 45 to 64, and 25.1% who were 65 years of age or older. The median age was 46 years. For every 100 females, there were 98.4 males. For every 100 females age 18 and over, there were 102.0 males.

The median income for a household in the city was $36,875, and the median income for a family was $48,929. Males had a median income of $37,583 versus $21,250 for females. The per capita income for the city was $20,206. About 6.5% of families and 10.0% of the population were below the poverty line, including 11.6% of those under age 18 and 14.0% of those age 65 or over.
