= Milnor, North Dakota =

City in North Dakota, United States

- City
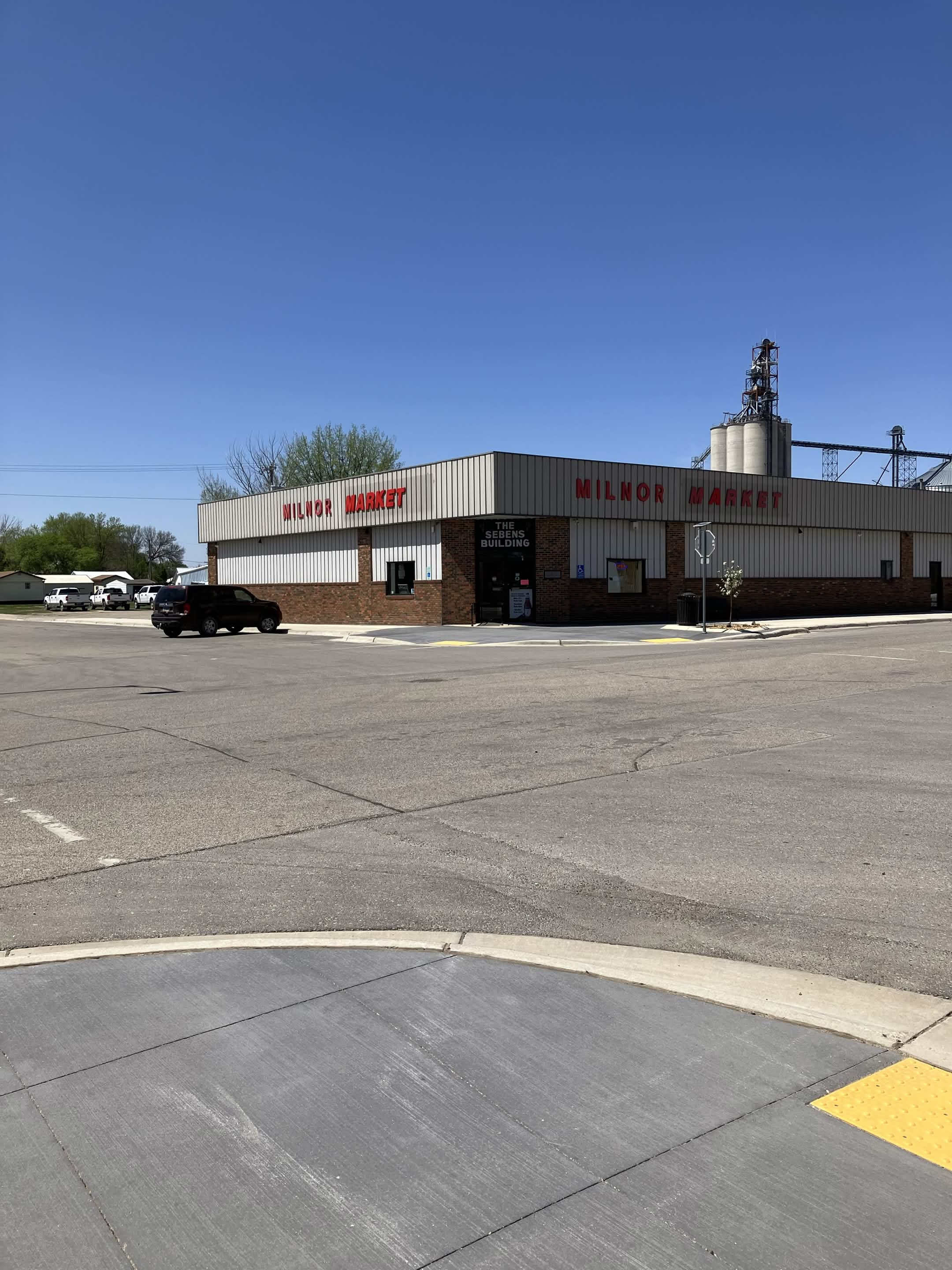

- Icon
- Nicknames: M - Town, Little Town on the Plains
- Motto: "Everything Your Rural Heart Could Desire!"
- Location of Milnor, North Dakota
- Coordinates: 46°15′30″N 97°27′21″W
- Country: United States
- State: North Dakota
- County: Sargent
- Founded: 1883

Area
  - Total: 1.08 sq mi (2.79 km^{2})
  - Land: 1.00 sq mi (2.59 km^{2})
  - Water: 0.077 sq mi (0.20 km^{2})
- Elevation: 1,099 ft (335 m)

Population (2020)
  - Total: 624
  - Estimate (2022): 615
  - Density: 623.1/sq mi (240.59/km^{2})
- Time zone: UTC-6 (Central (CST))
  - Summer (DST): UTC-5 (CDT)
- ZIP code: 58060
- Area code: 701
- FIPS code: 38-52940
- GNIS feature ID: 1036162
- Website: milnornd.com

Milnor is a city in Sargent County, North Dakota, United States. The population was 624 at the 2020 census.

== History ==
Milnor was founded in 1883 and officially named the same year. The city was named after William Edward Milnor, the first telegrapher at the Milnor Station, and WM Milnor Roberts, a famous civil engineer. It was the first city to be founded in Sargent County.

== Geography ==
According to the United States Census Bureau, the city has a total area of 1.01 square miles (2.62 km^{2}), of which 0.94 square miles (2.43 km^{2}) is land and 0.07 square miles (0.18 km^{2}) is water.

== Demographics ==
Historical population
Census	Pop.	Note	%±
1890	279		—
1900	322		15.4%
1910	641		99.1%
1920	680		6.1%
1930	564		−17.1%
1940	677		20.0%
1950	674		−0.4%
1960	658		−2.4%
1970	645		−2.0%
1980	716		11.0%
1990	651		−9.1%
2000	711		9.2%
2010	653		−8.2%
2020	624		−4.4%
2022 (est.)	615		−1.4%
U.S. Decennial Census; 2020 Census

=== 2010 census ===
As of the census of 2010, there were 653 people, 289 households, and 189 families residing in the city. The population density was 694.7 inhabitants per square mile (268.2/km^{2}). There were 350 housing units at an average density of 372.3 per square mile (143.7/km^{2}). The racial makeup of the city was 98.6% White, 0.5% Native American, 0.2% from other races, and 0.8% from two or more races. Hispanic or Latino of any race were 0.2% of the population.

There were 289 households, of which 29.8% had children under the age of 18 living with them, 57.1% were married couples living together, 5.5% had a female householder with no husband present, 2.8% had a male householder with no wife present, and 34.6% were non-families. 29.8% of all households were made up of individuals, and 15.6% had someone living alone who was 65 years of age or older. The average household size was 2.26 and the average family size was 2.80.

The median age in the city was 43.8 years. 23.7% of residents were under the age of 18; 5.3% were between the ages of 18 and 24; 23% were from 25 to 44; 29.3% were from 45 to 64; and 18.8% were 65 years of age or older. The gender makeup of the city was 51.0% male and 49.0% female.

=== 2000 census ===
As of the census of 2000, there were 711 people, 301 households, and 195 families residing in the city. The population density was 761.5 inhabitants per square mile (294.0/km^{2}). There were 338 housing units at an average density of 362.0 per square mile (139.8/km^{2}). The racial makeup of the city was 97.61% White, 1.41% Native American, 0.70% from other races, and 0.28% from two or more races. Hispanic or Latino of any race were 1.27% of the population.

There were 301 households, out of which 31.2% had children under the age of 18 living with them, 56.5% were married couples living together, 6.0% had a female householder with no husband present, and 35.2% were non-families. 31.9% of all households were made up of individuals, and 20.3% had someone living alone who was 65 years of age or older. The average household size was 2.36 and the average family size was 3.02.

In the city, the population was spread out, with 27.8% under the age of 18, 3.8% from 18 to 24, 26.6% from 25 to 44, 23.1% from 45 to 64, and 18.7% who were 65 years of age or older. The median age was 40 years. For every 100 females, there were 95.9 males. For every 100 females age 18 and over, there were 97.3 males.

The median income for a household in the city was $35,789, and the median income for a family was $41,563. Males had a median income of $35,855 versus $17,143 for females. The per capita income for the city was $17,942. About 2.6% of families and 4.4% of the population were below the poverty line, including none of those under age 18 and 18.6% of those age 65 or over.
