= Gwinner, North Dakota =

- City
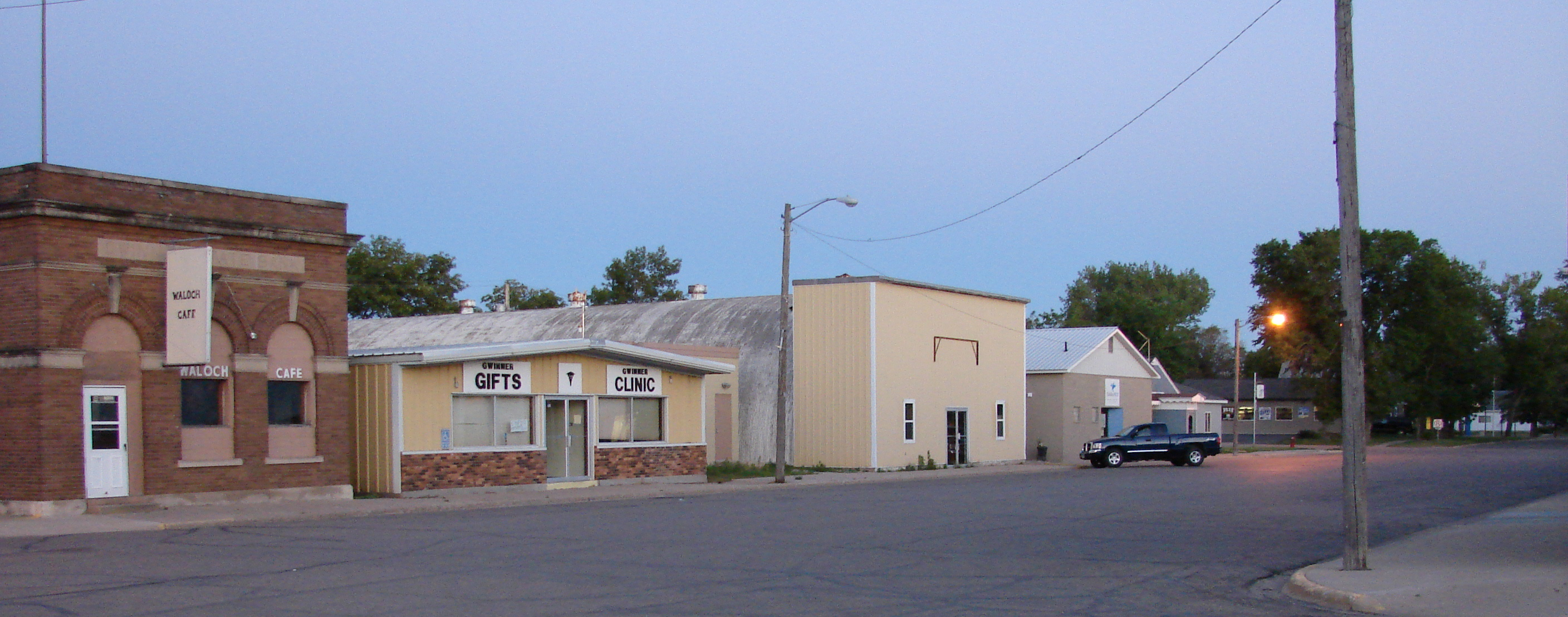
- East side of Main Street

- Logo
- Motto: Is Moving Forward...Come Along!
- Location of Gwinner, North Dakota
- Coordinates: 46°13′34″N 97°40′10″W
- Country: United States
- State: North Dakota
- County: Sargent
- Founded: 1900

Government
  - Mayor: Jaimie Gavin

Area
  - Total: 2.06 sq mi (5.34 km^{2})
  - Land: 2.06 sq mi (5.34 km^{2})
  - Water: 0 sq mi (0.00 km^{2})
- Elevation: 1,266 ft (386 m)

Population (2020)
  - Total: 924
  - Estimate (2022): 919
  - Density: 448.0/sq mi (172.99/km^{2})
- Time zone: UTC-6 (Central (CST))
  - Summer (DST): UTC-5 (CDT)
- ZIP code: 58040
- Area code: 701
- FIPS code: 38-34020
- GNIS feature ID: 1036070
- Website: gwinnernd.com

Gwinner is a city in Sargent County, North Dakota, United States. The population was 924 at the 2020 census. Gwinner was founded in 1900.

== Geography ==
According to the United States Census Bureau, the city has a total area of 2.08 square miles (5.39 km^{2}), all land.

== Demographics ==
Historical population
Census	Pop.	Note	%±
1950	197		—
1960	242		22.8%
1970	623		157.4%
1980	725		16.4%
1990	585		−19.3%
2000	717		22.6%
2010	753		5.0%
2020	924		22.7%
2022 (est.)	919		−0.5%
U.S. Decennial Census; 2020 Census

=== 2010 census ===
As of the census of 2010, there were 753 people, 322 households, and 203 families residing in the city. The population density was 362.0 inhabitants per square mile (139.8/km^{2}). There were 370 housing units at an average density of 177.9 per square mile (68.7/km^{2}). The racial makeup of the city was 97.3% White, 0.8% Native American, 0.5% Asian, 0.8% from other races, and 0.5% from two or more races. Hispanic or Latino of any race were 2.0% of the population.

There were 322 households, of which 35.7% had children under the age of 18 living with them, 50.0% were married couples living together, 5.9% had a female householder with no husband present, 7.1% had a male householder with no wife present, and 37.0% were non-families. 31.7% of all households were made up of individuals, and 9.4% had someone living alone who was 65 years of age or older. The average household size was 2.34 and the average family size was 2.98.

The median age in the city was 37.4 years. 27.6% of residents were under the age of 18; 6.7% were between the ages of 18 and 24; 26.5% were from 25 to 44; 26.6% were from 45 to 64; and 12.5% were 65 years of age or older. The gender makeup of the city was 53.8% male and 46.2% female.

=== 2000 census ===
As of the census of 2000, there were 717 people, 298 households, and 202 families residing in the city. The population density was 560.2 inhabitants per square mile (216.3/km^{2}). There were 329 housing units at an average density of 257.0 per square mile (99.2/km^{2}). The racial makeup of the city was 98.33% White, 0.42% Native American, 0.84% from other races, and 0.42% from two or more races. Hispanic or Latino of any race were 1.12% of the population.

There were 298 households, out of which 31.9% had children under the age of 18 living with them, 57.7% were married couples living together, 4.7% had a female householder with no husband present, and 32.2% were non-families. 26.8% of all households were made up of individuals, and 9.1% had someone living alone who was 65 years of age or older. The average household size was 2.41 and the average family size was 2.94.

In the city, the population was spread out, with 26.9% under the age of 18, 7.7% from 18 to 24, 30.5% from 25 to 44, 23.2% from 45 to 64, and 11.7% who were 65 years of age or older. The median age was 35 years. For every 100 females, there were 110.3 males. For every 100 females age 18 and over, there were 106.3 males.

The median income for a household in the city was $44,000, and the median income for a family was $48,250. Males had a median income of $39,150 versus $20,417 for females. The per capita income for the city was $18,272. About 8.2% of families and 9.8% of the population were below the poverty line, including 13.1% of those under age 18 and 6.9% of those age 65 or over.

== Industry ==
Gwinner is the site of a manufacturing facility of Bobcat Company and was once the location of its American headquarters. Bobcat, which produces a skidsteer, track loader, and mini-excavator. It is one of the largest employers in North Dakota and provides economic stability to Gwinner and the entire region.
