= Cogswell, North Dakota =

- City
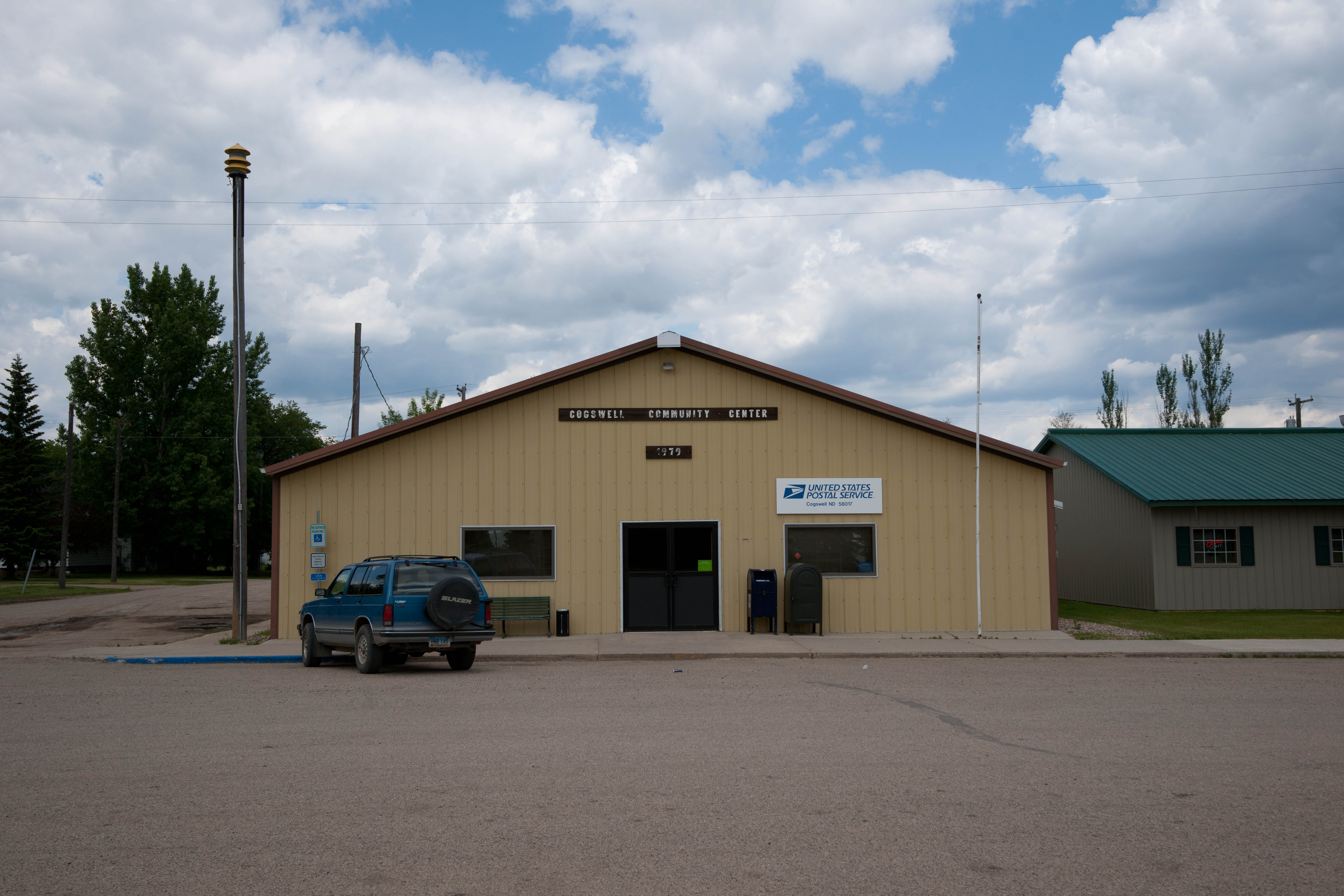
- Cogswell Community Center

- Location of Cogswell, North Dakota
- Coordinates: 46.681174°N 97.970358°W
- Country: United States
- State: North Dakota
- County: Sargent
- Founded: 1890

Area
  - Total: 0.330 sq mi (0.854 km^{2})
  - Land: 0.330 sq mi (0.854 km^{2})
  - Water: 0 sq mi (0.000 km^{2})
- Elevation: 1,302 ft (397 m)

Population (2020)
  - Total: 73
  - Estimate (2024): 69
  - Density: 221.5/sq mi (85.52/km^{2})
- Time zone: UTC–6 (Central (CST))
  - Summer (DST): UTC–5 (CDT)
- ZIP Code: 58017
- Area code: 701
- FIPS code: 38-15100
- GNIS feature ID: 1035973

Cogswell is a city in Sargent County, North Dakota, United States. The population was 73 at the 2020 census.

== History ==
Cogswell was founded in 1890.

== Geography ==
According to the United States Census Bureau, the city has a total area of 0.330 square miles (0.85 km^{2}), all land.

== Demographics ==
Historical population
Census	Pop.	Note	%±
1910	418		—
1920	445		6.5%
1930	426		−4.3%
1940	430		0.9%
1950	393		−8.6%
1960	305		−22.4%
1970	203		−33.4%
1980	227		11.8%
1990	184		−18.9%
2000	165		−10.3%
2010	99		−40.0%
2020	73		−26.3%
2024 (est.)	69		−5.5%
U.S. Decennial Census; 2020 Census

=== 2010 census ===
As of the 2010 census, there were 99 people, 50 households, and 30 families residing in the city. The population density was 300.0 inhabitants per square mile (115.8/km^{2}). There were 73 housing units at an average density of 221.2 per square mile (85.4/km^{2}). The racial makeup of the city was 94.9% White and 5.1% Native American.

There were 50 households, of which 14.0% had children under the age of 18 living with them, 50.0% were married couples living together, 4.0% had a female householder with no husband present, 6.0% had a male householder with no wife present, and 40.0% were non-families. 38.0% of all households were made up of individuals, and 14% had someone living alone who was 65 years of age or older. The average household size was 1.98 and the average family size was 2.53.

The median age in the city was 52.1 years. 14.1% of residents were under the age of 18; 3.1% were between the ages of 18 and 24; 9% were from 25 to 44; 56.6% were from 45 to 64; and 17.2% were 65 years of age or older. The gender makeup of the city was 57.6% male and 42.4% female.

=== 2000 census ===
As of the 2000 census, there were 165 people, 68 households, and 49 families residing in the city. The population density was 493.4 inhabitants per square mile (190.5/km^{2}). There were 81 housing units at an average density of 242.2 per square mile (93.5/km^{2}). The racial makeup of the city was 99.39% White, and 0.61% from two or more races. Hispanic or Latino of any race were 1.82% of the population.

There were 68 households, out of which 33.8% had children under the age of 18 living with them, 63.2% were married couples living together, 1.5% had a female householder with no husband present, and 27.9% were non-families. 27.9% of all households were made up of individuals, and 17.6% had someone living alone who was 65 years of age or older. The average household size was 2.43 and the average family size was 2.92.

In the city, the population was spread out, with 26.1% under the age of 18, 6.7% from 18 to 24, 29.1% from 25 to 44, 23.0% from 45 to 64, and 15.2% who were 65 years of age or older. The median age was 39 years. For every 100 females, there were 103.7 males. For every 100 females age 18 and over, there were 106.8 males.

The median income for a household in the city was $35,000, and the median income for a family was $45,208. Males had a median income of $31,250 versus $19,375 for females. The per capita income for the city was $14,086. About 1.8% of families and 2.5% of the population were below the poverty line, including none of those under the age of eighteen and 7.1% of those 65 or over.
