= List of cities in North Dakota =

Map of the United States with North Dakota highlighted

North Dakota is a state located in the Midwestern United States. All incorporated communities in North Dakota are considered cities, regardless of population; there are no towns, villages, or hamlets in the state. There are 355 municipalities.

== Cities ==
County seat
State capital and county seat

Notable incorporated cities in North Dakota

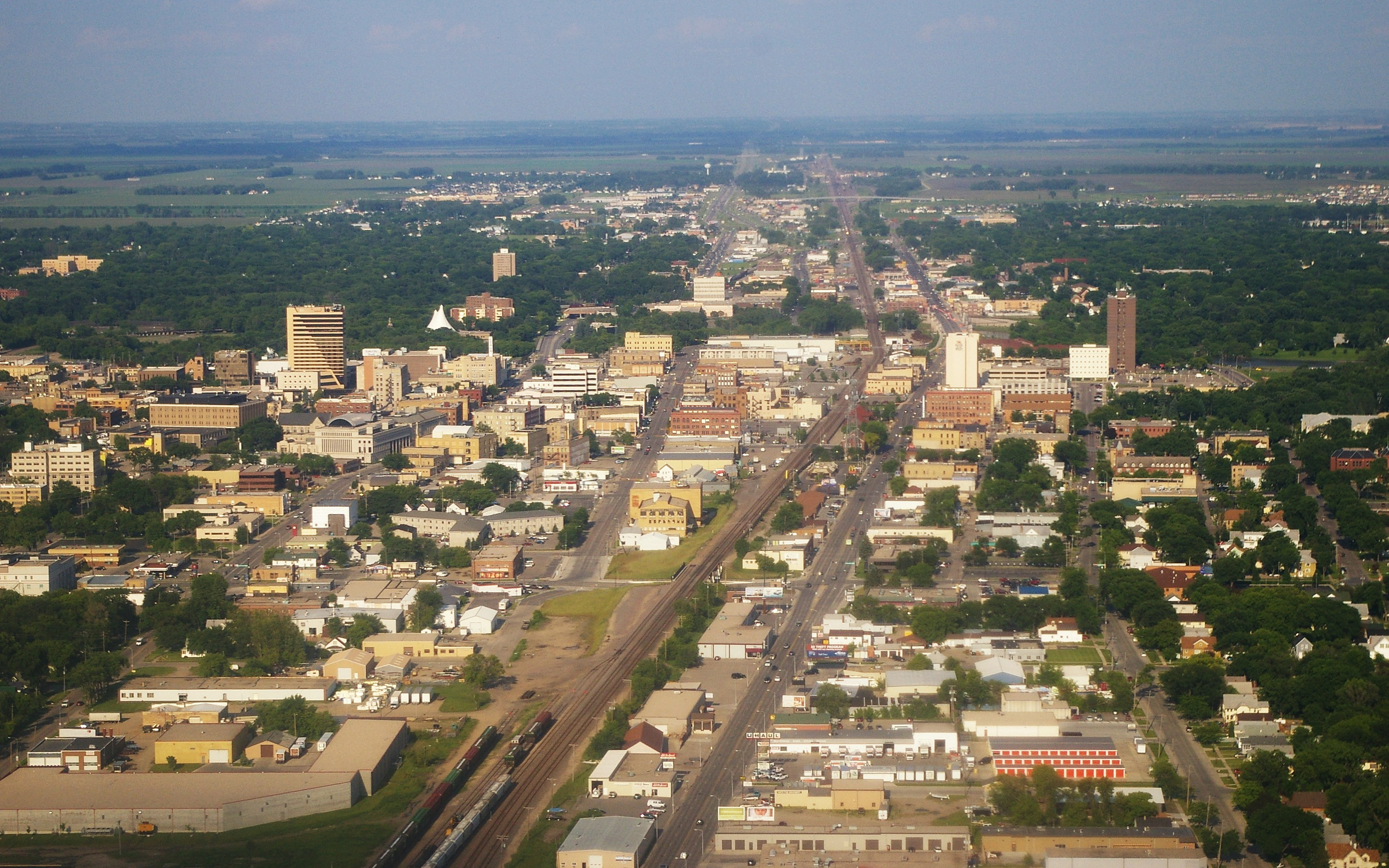
Fargo, most populous city in North Dakota

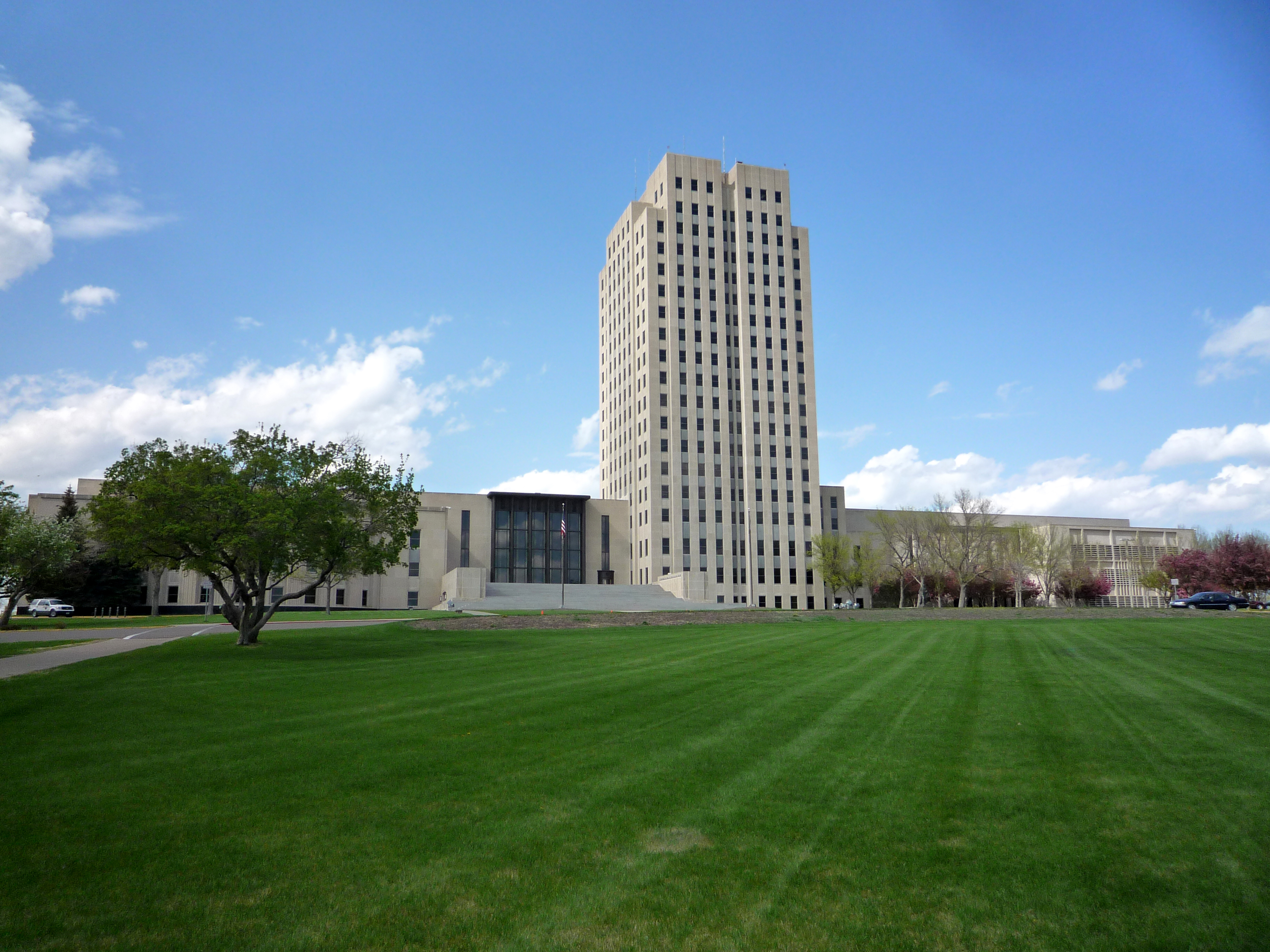
Bismarck, the capital of North Dakota and its second most populous city

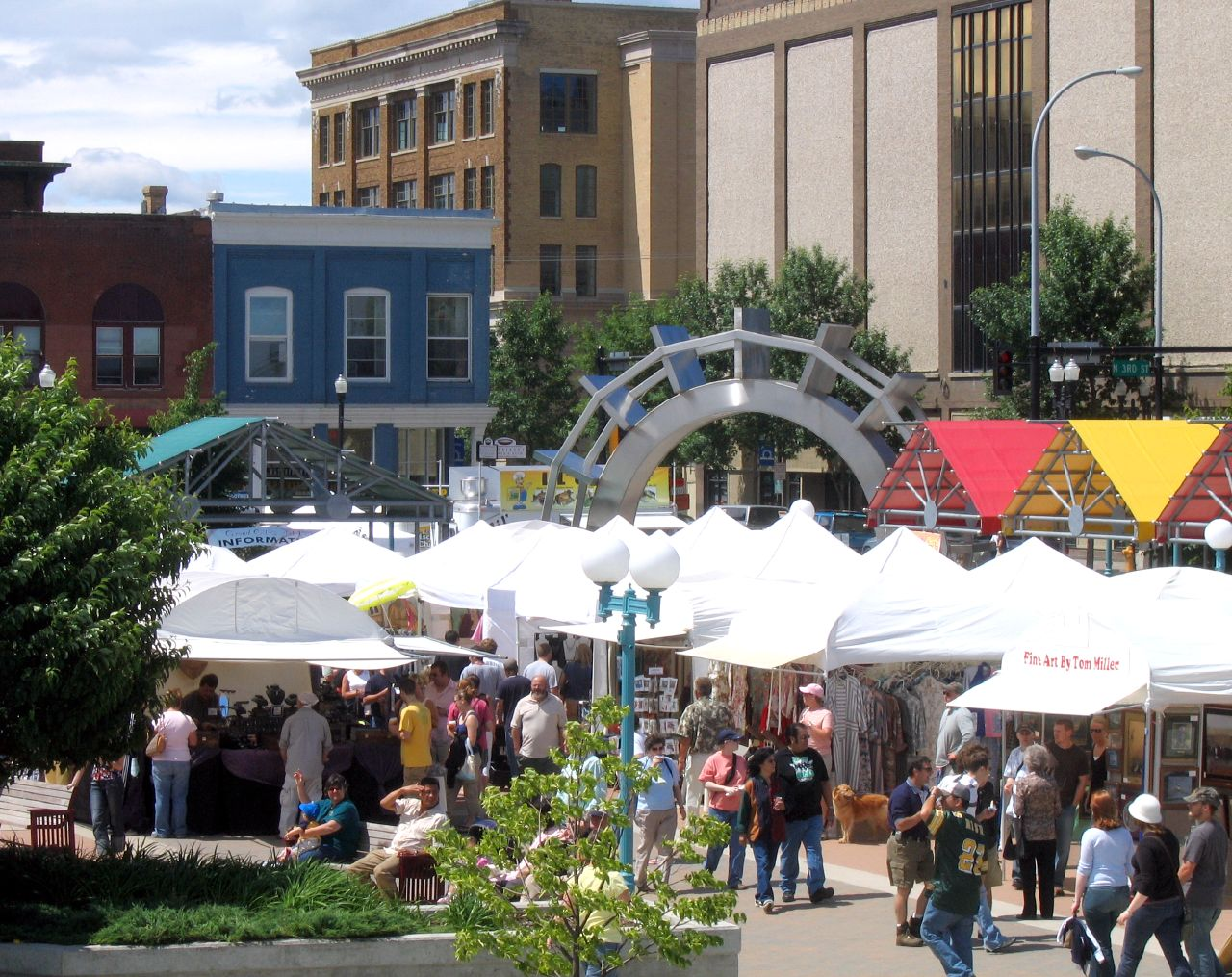
Downtown Grand Forks, the state's third most populous city

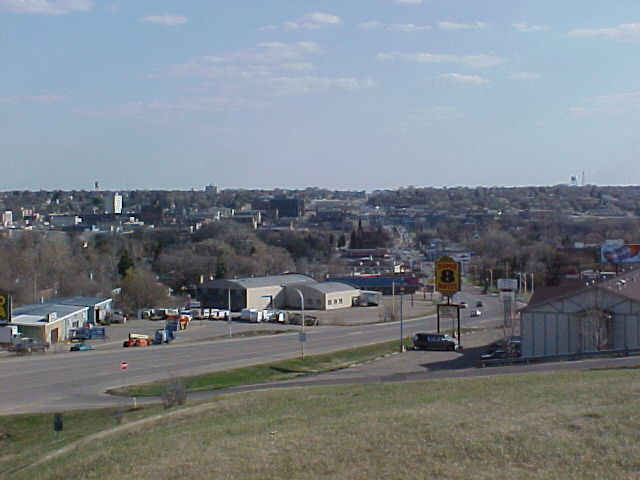
Minot, the fourth most populous city in North Dakota

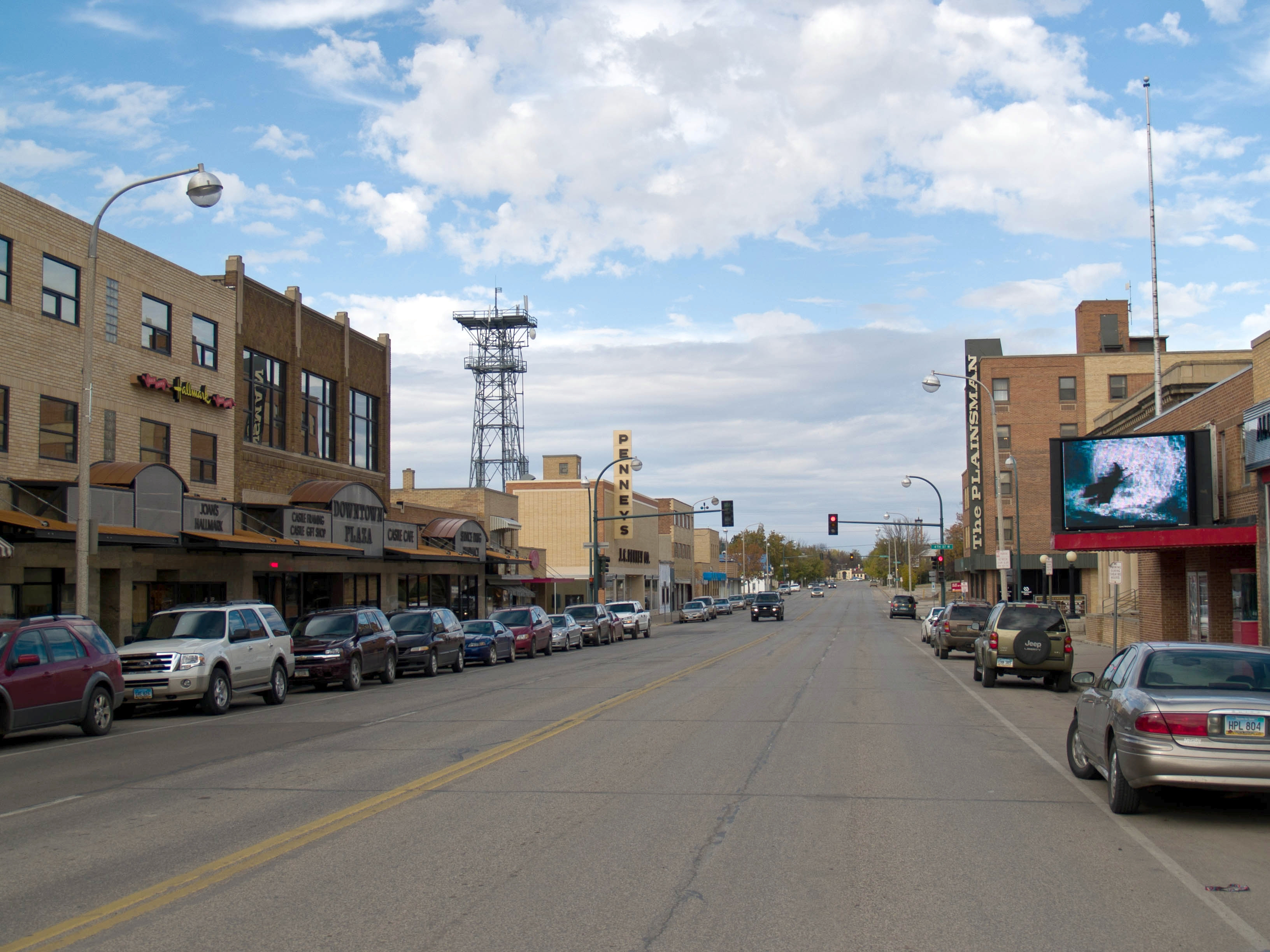
Downtown Williston, a center of oil industry in the state and its sixth most populous city

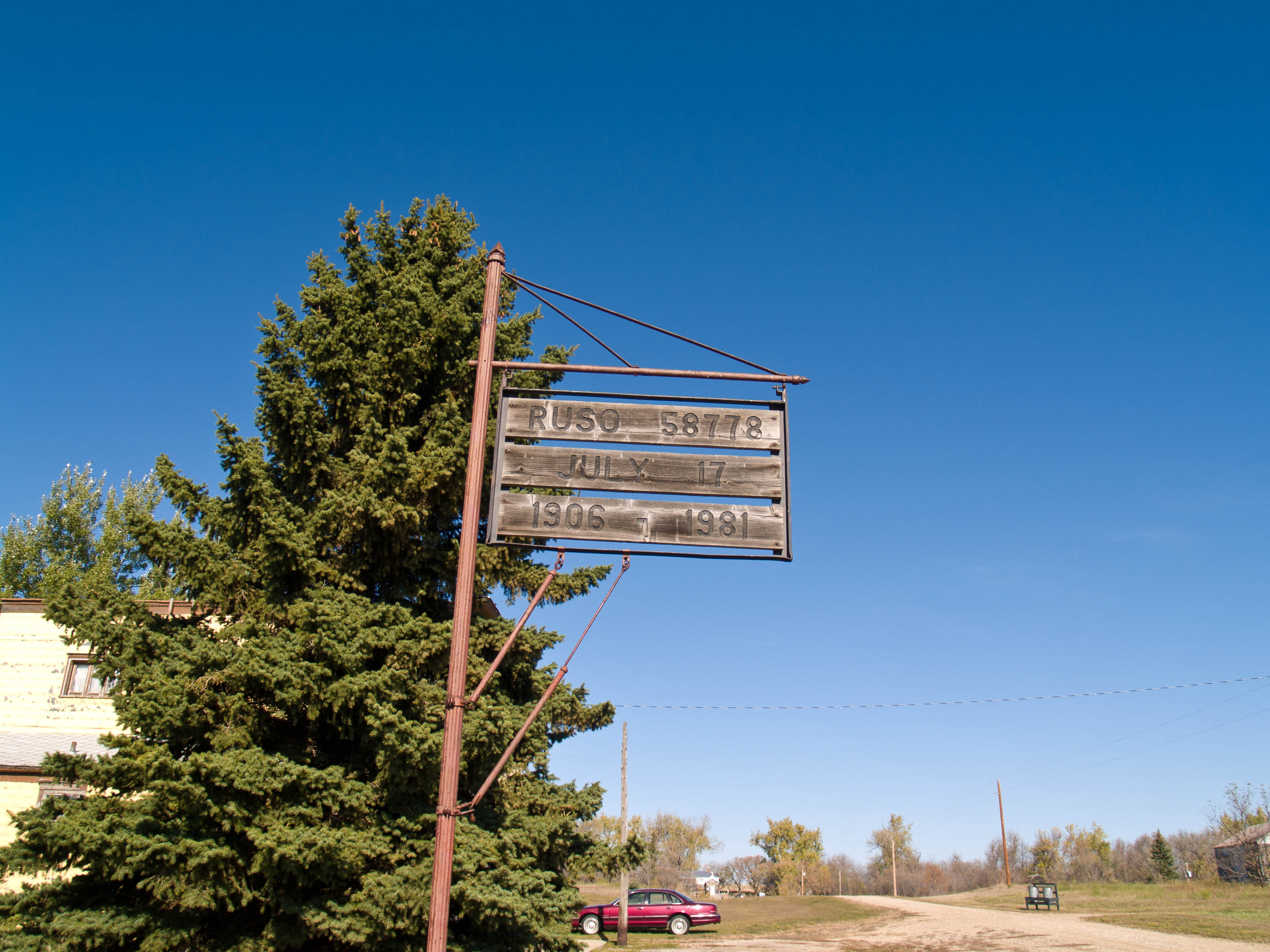
Ruso, the least populous incorporated city in North Dakota

2025 Rank	City	2025 Estimate	2020 Census	Change	County
1	Fargo	136,275	125,990	+8.16%	Cass
2	Bismarck	77,963	73,622	+5.90%	Burleigh
3	Grand Forks	60,365	59,166	+2.03%	Grand Forks
4	Minot	47,308	48,377	−2.21%	Ward
5	West Fargo	41,175	38,626	+6.60%	Cass
6	Williston	29,522	29,160	+1.24%	Williams
7	Dickinson	25,870	25,679	+0.74%	Stark
8	Mandan	25,061	24,206	+3.53%	Morton
9	Jamestown	15,688	15,849	−1.02%	Stutsman
10	Wahpeton	8,141	8,007	+1.67%	Richland
11	Devils Lake	7,333	7,192	+1.96%	Ramsey
12	Horace	7,001	3,085	+126.94%	Cass
13	Valley City	6,430	6,575	−2.21%	Barnes
14	Watford City	6,378	6,207	+2.75%	McKenzie
15	Lincoln	4,493	4,257	+5.54%	Burleigh
16	Grafton	4,023	4,170	−3.53%	Walsh
17	Beulah	3,077	3,058	+0.62%	Mercer
18	New Town	2,715	2,764	−1.77%	Mountrail
19	Casselton	2,485	2,479	+0.24%	Cass
20	Rugby	2,412	2,509	−3.87%	Pierce
21	Hazen	2,314	2,281	+1.45%	Mercer
22	Tioga	2,221	2,202	+0.86%	Williams
23	Lisbon	2,184	2,204	−0.91%	Ransom
24	Stanley	2,181	2,321	−6.03%	Mountrail
25	Bottineau	2,152	2,194	−1.91%	Bottineau
26	Carrington	1,950	2,080	−6.25%	Foster
27	Langdon	1,809	1,909	−5.24%	Cavalier
28	Mayville	1,807	1,854	−2.54%	Traill
29	Oakes	1,765	1,798	−1.84%	Dickey
30	Hillsboro	1,648	1,649	−0.06%	Traill
31	Harvey	1,532	1,650	−7.15%	Wells
32	Mapleton	1,496	1,320	+13.33%	Cass
33	Surrey	1,450	1,357	+6.85%	Ward
34	Garrison	1,446	1,462	−1.09%	McLean
35	Park River	1,363	1,424	−4.28%	Walsh
36	Larimore	1,359	1,260	+7.86%	Grand Forks
37	Bowman	1,357	1,470	−7.69%	Bowman
38	Burlington	1,350	1,291	+4.57%	Ward
39	New Rockford	1,342	1,361	−1.40%	Eddy
40	Washburn	1,254	1,300	−3.54%	McLean
41	Cavalier	1,218	1,246	−2.25%	Pembina
42	Rolla	1,156	1,223	−5.48%	Rolette
43	Ellendale	1,129	1,125	+0.36%	Dickey
44	Hettinger	1,119	1,074	+4.19%	Adams
45	Thompson	1,100	1,101	−0.09%	Grand Forks
46	New Salem	1,082	973	+11.20%	Morton
47	Cando	1,051	1,117	−5.91%	Towner
48	Velva	1,046	1,086	−3.68%	McHenry
49	Kindred	1,044	889	+17.44%	Cass
50	Linton	1,041	1,071	−2.80%	Emmons
51	Crosby	1,027	1,065	−3.57%	Divide
52	Belfield	999	996	+0.30%	Stark
53	Beach	994	981	+1.33%	Golden Valley
54	Cooperstown	969	983	−1.42%	Griggs
55	Northwood	959	982	−2.34%	Grand Forks
56	Hankinson	936	921	+1.63%	Richland
57	Killdeer	912	939	−2.88%	Dunn
58	Kenmare	911	961	−5.20%	Ward
59	Parshall	895	949	−5.69%	Mountrail
60	Gwinner	894	924	−3.25%	Sargent
61	Reile's Acres	880	703	+25.18%	Cass
62	Walhalla	867	893	−2.91%	Pembina
63	Enderlin	860	881	−2.38%	Ransom
64	Harwood	845	794	+6.42%	Cass
65	Wishek	827	864	−4.28%	McIntosh
66	Hebron	792	794	−0.25%	Morton
67	Ray	768	740	+3.78%	Williams
68	Underwood	760	784	−3.06%	McLean
69	LaMoure	758	764	−0.79%	LaMoure
70	Napoleon	738	749	−1.47%	Logan
71	Drayton	724	757	−4.36%	Pembina
72	New England	717	683	+4.98%	Hettinger
73	Glen Ullin	708	732	−3.28%	Morton
74	Hatton	708	712	−0.56%	Traill
75	Mohall	706	694	+1.73%	Renville
76	Wilton	702	718	−2.23%	McLean
77	Richardton	695	692	+0.43%	Stark
78	Lakota	683	683	0.00%	Nelson
79	Steele	664	665	−0.15%	Kidder
80	Mott	645	653	−1.23%	Hettinger
81	Minto	610	616	−0.97%	Walsh
82	Dunseith	606	632	−4.11%	Rolette
83	Milnor	606	624	−2.88%	Sargent
84	Ashley	599	613	−2.28%	McIntosh
85	Lidgerwood	585	600	−2.50%	Richland
86	Edgeley	584	585	−0.17%	LaMoure
87	Center	583	588	−0.85%	Oliver
88	Portland	576	578	−0.35%	Traill
89	Turtle Lake	524	542	−3.32%	McLean
90	Elgin	516	543	−4.97%	Grant
91	Pembina	492	512	−3.91%	Pembina
92	Forman	489	509	−3.93%	Sargent
93	Argusville	474	480	−1.25%	Cass
94	Berthold	464	490	−5.31%	Ward
95	Rolette	462	484	−4.55%	Rolette
96	Towner	454	479	−5.22%	McHenry
97	Emerado	452	443	+2.03%	Grand Forks
98	Wyndmere	442	454	−2.64%	Richland
99	Fessenden	437	462	−5.41%	Wells
100	Leeds	424	442	−4.07%	Benson
101	South Heart	419	394	+6.35%	Stark
102	Glenburn	414	404	+2.48%	Renville
103	Finley	392	401	−2.24%	Steele
104	McVille	386	392	−1.53%	Nelson
105	Maddock	384	402	−4.48%	Benson
106	Kulm	372	368	+1.09%	LaMoure
107	Powers Lake	372	385	−3.38%	Burke
108	Oxbow	371	381	−2.62%	Cass
109	Westhope	369	374	−1.34%	Bottineau
110	Manvel	368	377	−2.39%	Grand Forks
111	Stanton	367	368	−0.27%	Mercer
112	Strasburg	357	379	−5.80%	Emmons
113	Buxton	349	348	+0.29%	Traill
114	Fairmount	331	343	−3.50%	Richland
115	Neche	331	344	−3.78%	Pembina
116	Arthur	328	328	0.00%	Cass
117	Alexander	325	319	+1.88%	McKenzie
118	Hunter	325	332	−2.11%	Cass
119	Max	321	331	−3.02%	McLean
120	McClusky	320	322	−0.62%	Sheridan
121	St. John	310	322	−3.73%	Rolette
122	Sawyer	307	319	−3.76%	Ward
123	St. Thomas	305	323	−5.57%	Pembina
124	Arnegard	294	282	+4.26%	McKenzie
125	Bowbells	284	301	−5.65%	Burke
126	Gladstone	283	271	+4.43%	Stark
127	Gackle	280	281	−0.36%	Logan
128	Hope	278	272	+2.21%	Steele
129	Drake	277	292	−5.14%	McHenry
130	Reynolds	273	277	−1.44%	Traill
131	Tower City	273	268	+1.87%	Cass
132	Abercrombie	269	244	+10.25%	Richland
133	Walcott	268	262	+2.29%	Richland
134	Medina	262	264	−0.76%	Stutsman
135	Davenport	258	256	+0.78%	Cass
136	Michigan City	258	263	−1.90%	Nelson
137	Gilby	246	243	+1.23%	Grand Forks
138	Hoople	242	247	−2.02%	Walsh
139	Carson	241	254	−5.12%	Grant
140	Leonard	241	248	−2.82%	Cass
141	Scranton	240	258	−6.98%	Bowman
142	Dunn Center	235	227	+3.52%	Dunn
143	Aneta	233	234	−0.43%	Nelson
144	Granville	231	240	−3.75%	McHenry
145	Halliday	231	241	−4.15%	Dunn
146	Flasher	230	217	+5.99%	Morton
147	Grenora	230	221	+4.07%	Williams
148	Lansford	230	238	−3.36%	Bottineau
149	Taylor	230	230	0.00%	Stark
150	Zap	229	221	+3.62%	Mercer
151	Riverdale	221	223	−0.90%	McLean
152	Hazelton	218	223	−2.24%	Emmons
153	Colfax	217	172	+26.16%	Richland
154	Anamoose	216	230	−6.09%	McHenry
155	Tappen	216	217	−0.46%	Kidder
156	New Leipzig	206	218	−5.50%	Grant
157	Plaza	204	211	−3.32%	Mountrail
158	Fordville	199	207	−3.86%	Walsh
159	Sherwood	196	194	+1.03%	Renville
160	Edinburg	193	199	−3.02%	Walsh
161	Frontier	193	195	−1.03%	Cass
162	Grandin	191	186	+2.69%	Cass
163	Minnewaukan	190	199	−4.52%	Benson
164	Golden Valley	189	191	−1.05%	Mercer
165	Buffalo	188	195	−3.59%	Cass
166	Page	187	190	−1.58%	Cass
167	Sheyenne	184	186	−1.08%	Eddy
168	Des Lacs	182	185	−1.62%	Ward
169	Munich	181	190	−4.74%	Cavalier
170	Mooreton	177	177	0.00%	Richland
171	Wimbledon	176	178	−1.12%	Barnes
172	Fort Yates	167	176	−5.11%	Sioux
173	Regent	167	170	−1.76%	Hettinger
174	Litchville	163	169	−3.55%	Barnes
175	Binford	162	170	−4.71%	Griggs
176	Sanborn	160	161	−0.62%	Barnes
177	Medora	157	121	+29.75%	Billings
178	Petersburg	157	162	−3.09%	Nelson
179	Rutland	156	163	−4.29%	Sargent
180	Makoti	153	148	+3.38%	Ward
181	Streeter	150	149	+0.67%	Stutsman
182	Christine	149	151	−1.32%	Richland
183	Rhame	149	158	−5.70%	Bowman
184	Willow City	148	149	−0.67%	Bottineau
185	Kensal	146	146	0.00%	Stutsman
186	Carpio	140	144	−2.78%	Ward
187	Edmore	138	139	−0.72%	Ramsey
188	Wing	137	132	+3.79%	Burleigh
189	Pick City	135	123	+9.76%	Mercer
190	Noonan	133	137	−2.92%	Divide
191	Tolna	132	136	−2.94%	Nelson
192	Bowdon	131	137	−4.38%	Wells
193	Lignite	131	141	−7.09%	Burke
194	Columbus	130	139	−6.47%	Burke
195	Reeder	130	125	+4.00%	Adams
196	Upham	130	135	−3.70%	McHenry
197	Marion	128	125	+2.40%	LaMoure
198	Gardner	125	129	−3.10%	Cass
199	Hannaford	122	126	−3.17%	Griggs
200	Mercer	122	88	+38.64%	McLean
201	Palermo	122	125	−2.40%	Mountrail
202	Adams	121	127	−4.72%	Walsh
203	Selfridge	119	127	−6.30%	Sioux
204	Wildrose	119	115	+3.48%	Williams
205	Portal	117	125	−6.40%	Burke
206	Crary	112	113	−0.88%	Ramsey
207	Galesburg	112	118	−5.08%	Traill
208	Oriska	110	114	−3.51%	Barnes
209	Forest River	109	109	0.00%	Walsh
210	Goodrich	109	106	+2.83%	Sheridan
211	Crystal	108	116	−6.90%	Pembina
212	Ryder	103	108	−4.63%	Ward
213	Bisbee	102	110	−7.27%	Towner
214	Lankin	98	102	−3.92%	Walsh
215	Starkweather	97	100	−3.00%	Ramsey
216	Ross	96	95	+1.05%	Mountrail
217	Spiritwood Lake	96	97	−1.03%	Stutsman
218	Fort Ransom	95	91	+4.40%	Ransom
219	Sykeston	95	105	−9.52%	Wells
220	Sheldon	94	95	−1.05%	Ransom
221	Almont	93	100	−7.00%	Morton
222	Deering	93	94	−1.06%	McHenry
223	Glenfield	93	94	−1.06%	Foster
224	Newburg	93	96	−3.12%	Bottineau
225	Oberon	93	101	−7.92%	Benson
226	Osnabrock	93	105	−11.43%	Cavalier
227	White Earth	92	100	−8.00%	Mountrail
228	Esmond	91	91	0.00%	Benson
229	Marmarth	91	101	−9.90%	Slope
230	Rocklake	91	94	−3.19%	Towner
231	Amenia	90	85	+5.88%	Cass
232	Epping	89	84	+5.95%	Williams
233	Sharon	89	86	+3.49%	Steele
234	Douglas	88	93	−5.38%	Ward
235	Golva	88	84	+4.76%	Golden Valley
236	Montpelier	87	85	+2.35%	Stutsman
237	Dodge	86	89	−3.37%	Dunn
238	Fingal	86	92	−6.52%	Barnes
239	Karlsruhe	86	87	−1.15%	McHenry
240	Maxbass	86	89	−3.37%	Bottineau
241	Pisek	86	89	−3.37%	Walsh
242	Buchanan	84	87	−3.45%	Stutsman
243	Zeeland	82	82	0.00%	McIntosh
244	Cleveland	81	57	+42.11%	Stutsman
245	Lehr	80	81	−1.23%	Logan
246	Mountain	79	80	−1.25%	Pembina
247	Dwight	77	80	−3.75%	Richland
248	Dawson	76	74	+2.70%	Kidder
249	Dazey	74	78	−5.13%	Barnes
250	Pekin	74	75	−1.33%	Nelson
251	Donnybrook	72	75	−4.00%	Ward
252	Hague	70	70	0.00%	Emmons
253	Butte	69	70	−1.43%	McLean
254	Cogswell	69	73	−5.48%	Sargent
255	Sentinel Butte	69	61	+13.11%	Golden Valley
256	Mantador	68	67	+1.49%	Richland
257	Benedict	66	68	−2.94%	McLean
258	Jud	66	65	+1.54%	LaMoure
259	Solen	66	70	−5.71%	Sioux
260	Coleharbor	64	59	+8.47%	McLean
261	Havana	64	67	−4.48%	Sargent
262	Kathryn	64	66	−3.03%	Barnes
263	Balta	63	66	−4.55%	Pierce
264	Martin	62	63	−1.59%	Sheridan
265	Verona	62	59	+5.08%	LaMoure
266	Flaxton	61	60	+1.67%	Burke
267	McHenry	60	64	−6.25%	Foster
268	Pettibone	59	60	−1.67%	Kidder
269	Hurdsfield	58	64	−9.37%	Wells
270	Tuttle	58	60	−3.33%	Kidder
271	Alamo	56	53	+5.66%	Williams
272	Fullerton	56	62	−9.68%	Dickey
273	North River	56	55	+1.82%	Cass
274	Prairie Rose	55	56	−1.79%	Cass
275	Rogers	53	49	+8.16%	Barnes
276	Briarwood	52	57	−8.77%	Cass
277	Grace City	52	53	−1.89%	Foster
278	Great Bend	52	49	+6.12%	Richland
279	Warwick	51	55	−7.27%	Benson
280	Dickey	50	42	+19.05%	LaMoure
281	Nome	48	51	−5.88%	Barnes
282	Bathgate	46	47	−2.13%	Pembina
283	Woodworth	46	44	+4.55%	Stutsman
284	Alice	43	41	+4.88%	Cass
285	Barney	43	40	+7.50%	Richland
286	Niagara	43	46	−6.52%	Grand Forks
287	Pingree	43	41	+4.88%	Stutsman
288	Tolley	43	41	+4.88%	Renville
289	Voltaire	43	46	−6.52%	McHenry
290	Wolford	42	43	−2.33%	Pierce
291	Hamilton	40	46	−13.04%	Pembina
292	Cayuga	39	40	−2.50%	Sargent
293	Fredonia	39	38	+2.63%	Logan
294	Milton	39	39	0.00%	Cavalier
295	Souris	39	37	+5.41%	Bottineau
296	Inkster	38	38	0.00%	Grand Forks
297	Courtenay	37	36	+2.78%	Stutsman
298	Landa	37	41	−9.76%	Bottineau
299	Forbes	36	36	0.00%	Dickey
300	Robinson	36	36	0.00%	Kidder
301	Regan	35	35	0.00%	Burleigh
302	Springbrook	35	37	−5.41%	Williams
303	Brocket	34	34	0.00%	Ramsey
304	Berlin	33	31	+6.45%	LaMoure
305	Ardoch	31	31	0.00%	Walsh
306	Clifford	31	30	+3.33%	Traill
307	Egeland	31	32	−3.12%	Towner
308	Fairdale	31	30	+3.33%	Walsh
309	Canton City	30	31	−3.23%	Pembina
310	Fortuna	30	30	0.00%	Divide
311	Monango	30	30	0.00%	Dickey
312	Alsen	29	32	−9.37%	Cavalier
313	Nekoma	29	31	−6.45%	Cavalier
314	Brinsmade	28	30	−6.67%	Benson
315	Hampden	28	29	−3.45%	Ramsey
316	Leith	27	28	−3.57%	Grant
317	Luverne	27	28	−3.57%	Steele
318	Kramer	23	24	−4.17%	Bottineau
319	Leal	23	27	−14.81%	Barnes
320	Elliott	22	24	−8.33%	Ransom
321	Gardena	22	24	−8.33%	Bottineau
322	Amidon	21	24	−12.50%	Slope
323	Gascoyne	21	21	0.00%	Bowman
324	Sarles	21	16	+31.25%	Cavalier
325	Knox	20	22	−9.09%	Benson
326	Antler	19	22	−13.64%	Bottineau
327	Braddock	19	18	+5.56%	Emmons
328	Cathay	19	20	−5.00%	Wells
329	Mylo	19	21	−9.52%	Rolette
330	Venturia	19	21	−9.52%	McIntosh
331	Lawton	18	15	+20.00%	Ramsey
332	Sibley	18	19	−5.26%	Barnes
333	Haynes	17	15	+13.33%	Adams
334	Ambrose	16	24	−33.33%	Divide
335	Balfour	15	20	−25.00%	McHenry
336	Bucyrus	15	18	−16.67%	Adams
337	Calvin	15	15	0.00%	Cavalier
338	Ludden	15	15	0.00%	Dickey
339	Conway	14	15	−6.67%	Walsh
340	Hansboro	14	15	−6.67%	Towner
341	York	14	17	−17.65%	Benson
342	Bergen	12	10	+20.00%	McHenry
343	Hamberg	12	11	+9.09%	Wells
344	Pillsbury	12	12	0.00%	Barnes
345	Ayr	10	11	−9.09%	Cass
346	Overly	10	10	0.00%	Bottineau
347	Grano	9	9	0.00%	Renville
348	Loraine	8	9	−11.11%	Renville
349	Wales	8	10	−20.00%	Cavalier
350	Calio	7	8	−12.50%	Cavalier
351	Hannah	7	8	−12.50%	Cavalier
352	Kief	7	8	−12.50%	McHenry
353	Loma	7	10	−30.00%	Cavalier
354	Perth	6	6	0.00%	Towner
355	Ruso	4	1	+300.00%	McLean

== See also ==
- North Dakota
- North Dakota statistical areas
- Founding dates of North Dakota incorporated cities
- List of census-designated places in North Dakota
