= List of founding dates of North Dakota incorporated cities =

This list contains the founding dates of North Dakota incorporated cities.

== 1850 ==
- Pembina

== 1870 ==
- Grand Forks

== 1871 ==
- Fargo
- Wahpeton
- Walhalla

== 1872 ==
- Bismarck
- Jamestown

== 1874 ==
- Valley City

== 1875 ==
- Mapleton

== 1876 ==
- Casselton

== 1877 ==
- Cavalier

== 1878 ==
- Buffalo
- Drayton

== 1879 ==
- Mandan
- Sanborn
- Tower City

== 1880 ==
- Amenia
- Dawson
- Fort Ransom
- Kindred
- Lisbon
- Steele
- Walcott

== 1881 ==
- Ardoch
- Argusville
- Arthur
- Bathgate
- Buxton
- Colfax
- Dwight
- Gardner
- Grafton
- Grandin
- Harwood
- Hillsboro
- Hope
- Hunter
- Larimore
- Manvel
- Mayville
- Minto
- Oriska
- Reynolds
- St. Thomas
- Thompson

== 1882 ==
- Canton
- Cleveland
- Cooperstown
- Crystal
- Davenport
- Devils Lake
- Dickinson
- Ellendale
- Galesburg
- Gladstone
- Hamilton
- Horace
- LaMoure
- Leonard
- Neche
- Page
- Pingree
- Pisek
- Portland
- Sheldon
- Stanton
- Tappen
- Taylor
- Washburn

== 1883 ==
- Ayr
- Belfield
- Burlington
- Carrington
- Clifford
- Dazey
- Elliott
- Forman
- Glen Ullin
- Hannaford
- Lakota
- Medora
- Michigan
- Milnor
- New Rockford
- New Salem
- Niagara
- Richardton
- Sheyenne
- Sykeston

== 1884 ==
- Abercrombie
- Cando
- Christine
- Crary
- Dunseith
- Fairmount
- Hatton
- Inkster
- Minnewaukan
- Mooreton
- Mountain
- Northwood
- Park River
- Petersburg

== 1885 ==
- Conway
- Dickey
- Emerado
- Hebron
- Langdon
- Montpelier
- Napoleon

== 1886 ==
- Churchs Ferry
- Edgeley
- Hankinson
- Lidgerwood
- Ludden
- Minot
- Monango
- Oakes
- Oberon
- Rugby
- Towner
- Verona

== 1887 ==
- Ashley
- Barton
- Berlin
- Bottineau
- Buchanan
- Cayuga
- Edingburg
- Forest River
- Gilby
- Havana
- Knox
- Leeds
- Milton
- New England
- Osnabrock
- Rutland
- Williston
- York

== 1888 ==
- Bisbee
- Des Lacs
- Fullerton
- Great Bend
- Rolla
- St. John
- White Earth

== 1889 ==
- Brinsmade
- Willow City

== 1890 ==
- Berwick
- Cogswell
- Hoople

== 1891 ==
- Enderlin
- Fingal

== 1892 ==
- Kensal
- Kulm
- Leal
- Omemee
- Wimbledon

== 1893 ==
- Cathay
- Courtenay
- Fessenden
- Harvey
- Mantador
- Maza
- Portal

== 1895 ==
- Donnybrook

== 1896 ==
- Aneta
- Finley
- Sharon

== 1897 ==
- Hannah
- Kenmare
- Perth
- Rogers
- Velva
- Wales

== 1898 ==
- Anamoose
- Bowbells
- Carpio
- Lehr
- Martin
- Sawyer
- Wishek

== 1899 ==
- Balfour
- Barney
- Binford
- Bowdon
- Braddock
- Linton
- McHenry
- Medina
- Wilton
- Wyndmere

== 1900 ==
- Alice
- Berthold
- Flaxton
- Granville
- Kathryn
- Litchville
- Surrey

== 1901 ==
- Brocket
- Edmore
- Esmond
- Goodrich
- Gwinner
- Maddock
- Marion
- Mohall
- Nome
- Souris
- Venturia
- Voltaire

== 1902 ==
- Beach
- Drake
- Hague
- Hazelton
- Lawton
- Omemee (disincorported c. 1990)
- Palermo
- Ray
- Ross
- Sentinel Butte
- Stanley
- Starkweather
- Strasburg
- Tioga
- Wheelock
- Zeeland

== 1903 ==
- Center
- Deering
- Flasher
- Fort Yates
- Glenburn
- Hampden
- Hurdsfield
- Lansford
- Spring Brook
- Underwood
- Westhope

== 1904 ==
- Gackle
- Landa
- Mott
- Munich
- Sherwood

== 1905 ==
- Adams
- Alexander
- Alsen
- Antler
- Bantry
- Bergen
- Calio
- Calvin
- Coleharbor
- Egeland
- Epping
- Fairdale
- Forbes
- Fordville
- Fredonia
- Gardena
- Garrison
- Grano
- Hansboro
- Jud
- Kramer
- Lankin
- Loma
- Maxbass
- McClusky
- Mercer
- Merricourt
- Mylo
- Nekoma
- Newburg
- Overly
- Rocklake
- Rolette
- Russell (disincorporated 1996)
- Sarles
- Streeter
- Tolley
- Turtle Lake
- Upham
- Wolford

== 1906 ==
- Almont
- Ambrose
- Benedict
- Butte
- Columbus
- Crosby
- Douglas
- Danzig ( disincorporated 2000)
- Max
- McVille
- Pekin
- Plaza
- Ruso
- Ryder
- Tolna

== 1907 ==
- Bowman
- Gascoyne
- Haynes
- Hettinger
- Larson
- Lignite
- Loraine
- Marmarth
- Noonan
- Reeder
- Scranton
- Warwick

== 1908 ==
- Bucyrus
- Kief
- Rhame
- South Heart

== 1909 ==
- Powers Lake

== 1910 ==
- Carson
- Elgin
- Grace City
- Leith
- New Leipzig
- Pettibone
- Regent
- Solen
- Wildrose

== 1911 ==
- Amidon
- Makoti
- Pillsbury
- Regan
- Robinson
- Tuttle
- Wing
- Woodworth

== 1912 ==
- Balta
- Glenfield
- Hamberg
- Karlsruhe
- Luverne
- Selfridge

== 1913 ==
- Arnegard
- Beulah
- Fortuna
- Golden Valley
- Hazen
- Rawson
- Zap

== 1914 ==
- Dunn Center
- Halliday
- Killdeer
- Parshall
- Watford City

== 1915 ==
- Dodge
- Golva

== 1916 ==
- Alamo
- Grenora
- Hanks
- Wabek

== 1918 ==
- Riverside

== 1926 ==
- West Fargo

== 1946 ==
- Pick City
- Riverdale

== 1953 ==
- New Town

== 1959 ==
- Sibley

== 1973 ==
- Briarwood
- North River
- Reile's Acres

== 1975 ==
- Prairie Rose

== 1976 ==
- Frontier

== 1977 ==
- Lincoln

== 1988 ==
- Oxbow
