= Renville County, North Dakota =

County in North Dakota, United States

- County
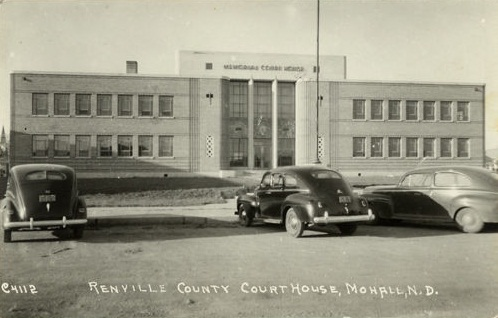
- The Renville County Courthouse in Mohall in 1940

- Location within the U.S. state of North Dakota
- Coordinates: 48.712781°N 101.658152°W
- Country: United States
- State: North Dakota
- Founded: January 4, 1873 (created); July 20, 1910 (organized)
- Named for: Joseph Renville
- Seat: Mohall
- Largest city: Mohall

Area
  - Total: 892.942 sq mi (2,312.71 km^{2})
  - Land: 877.244 sq mi (2,272.05 km^{2})
  - Water: 5.698 sq mi (14.76 km^{2}) 1.76%

Population (2020)
  - Total: 2,282
  - Estimate (2025): 2,331 ▲
  - Density: 2.709/sq mi (1.046/km^{2})
- Time zone: UTC−6 (Central)
  - Summer (DST): UTC−5 (CDT)
- Area code: 701
- Congressional district: At-large
- Website: renvillecountynd.org

Renville County is a county in the U.S. state of North Dakota. As of the 2020 census, the population was 2,282, and was estimated to be 2,331 in 2025. The county seat and the largest city is Mohall.

Renville County is part of the Minot metropolitan area. It is located south of the Canada–United States border with Saskatchewan.

== History ==
The Dakota Territory legislature created the county on January 4, 1873. It was named for Joseph Renville, an influential fur trader, interpreter, translator, and important figure in dealings between white men and the Sioux. The county was not organized at that time, nor was it attached to another county for administrative or judicial purposes. The proposed county boundaries were altered in 1883, in 1885, and 1887, and on November 8, 1892, the county was dissolved and absorbed into Bottineau and Ward counties due to a lack of settlement.

The general election held November 3, 1908 included a question asking whether a portion of Ward County should be partitioned off and named Renville County (covering a different area than the original county). This question reportedly failed to pass, but it was promptly contested in court, resulting in a ruling by the state Supreme Court ruled on June 3, 1910, that the split should be carried out. The state governor proclaimed the result in a July 12 proclamation, and the county government was organized on July 20 of that year, with Mohall as the county seat.

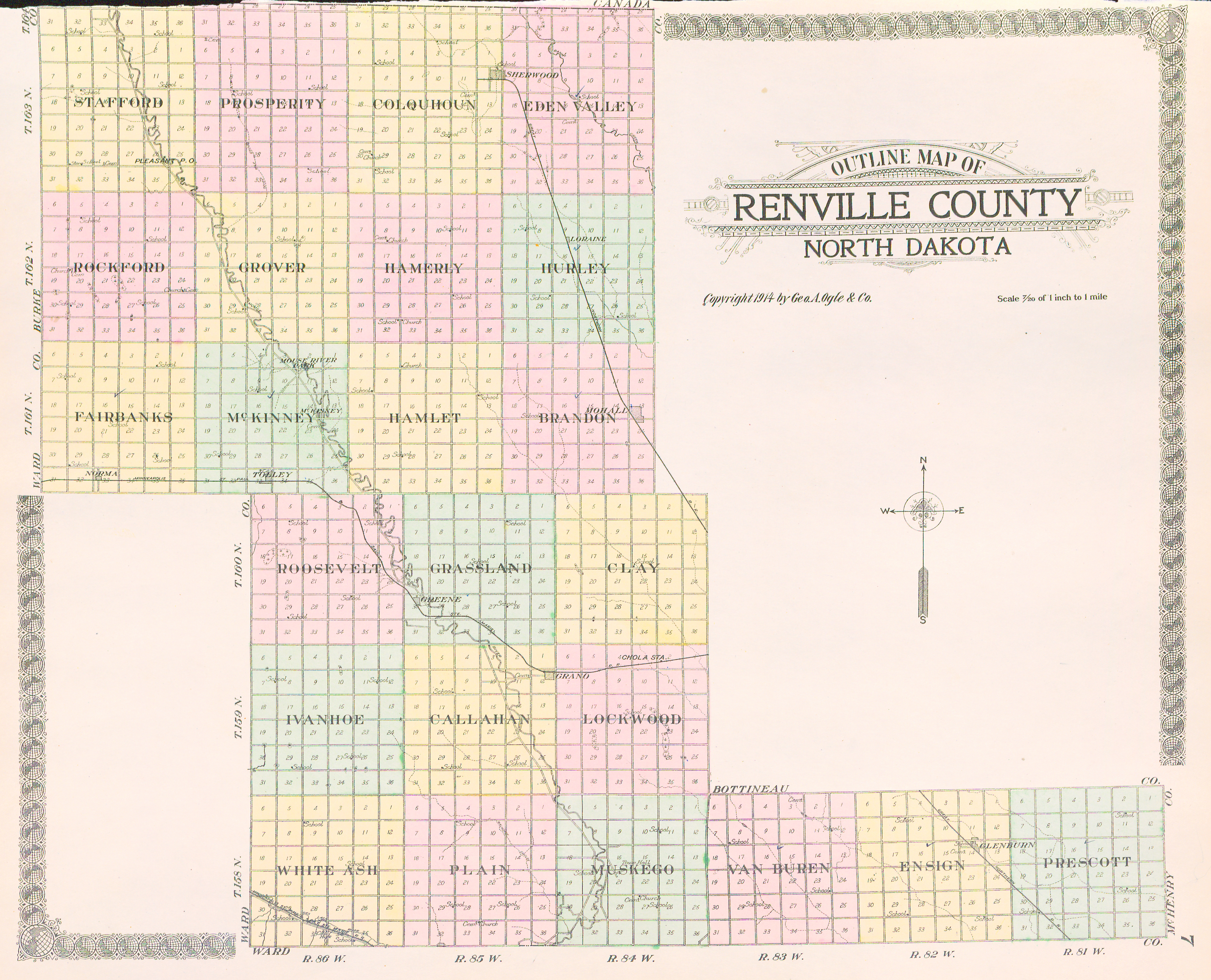
Outline map of Renville County, North Dakota, 1914

== Geography ==
Renville County lies on the north line of North Dakota; its north boundary line abuts the south boundary line of Canada. The Souris River flows southeasterly through the county on its way to Hudson Bay. The county terrain consists of rolling hills, largely devoted to agriculture. The terrain slopes to the south and east; its highest point is its SW corner, at 2,005 ft (611 m) ASL.

According to the United States Census Bureau, the county has a total area of 892.942 square miles (2,312.71 km^{2}), of which 877.244 square miles (2,272.05 km^{2}) is land and 5.698 square miles (14.76 km^{2}) (1.76%) is water. It is the 45th largest county in North Dakota by total area.

=== Major highways ===
- U.S. Highway 52
- U.S. Highway 83
- North Dakota Highway 5
- North Dakota Highway 28

=== Adjacent counties and rural municipalities ===
- Mount Pleasant No. 2, Saskatchewan - northwest
- Argyle No. 1, Saskatchewan - northeast
- Bottineau County - east
- McHenry County - southeast
- Ward County - south
- Burke County - west

=== Protected areas ===
- Upper Souris National Wildlife Refuge (part)
- Upper Souris Wildlife Refuge

=== Lakes ===
- Lake Darling (part)

== Demographics ==
Historical population
Census	Pop.	Note	%±
1910	7,840		—
1920	7,776		−0.8%
1930	7,263		−6.6%
1940	5,533		−23.8%
1950	5,405		−2.3%
1960	4,698		−13.1%
1970	3,828		−18.5%
1980	3,608		−5.7%
1990	3,160		−12.4%
2000	2,610		−17.4%
2010	2,470		−5.4%
2020	2,282		−7.6%
2025 (est.)	2,331	▲	2.1%
U.S. Decennial Census; 1790–1960 1900–1990; 1990–2000 2010–2020

As of the fourth quarter of 2024, the median home value in Renville County was $173,131.

As of the 2023 American Community Survey, there are 922 estimated households in Renville County with an average of 2.42 persons per household. The county has a median household income of $76,311. Approximately 7.1% of the county's population lives at or below the poverty line. Renville County has an estimated 65.3% employment rate, with 22.0% of the population holding a bachelor's degree or higher and 92.0% holding a high school diploma.

The top five reported ancestries (people were allowed to report up to two ancestries, thus the figures will generally add to more than 100%) were English (97.7%), Spanish (0.0%), Indo-European (2.0%), Asian and Pacific Islander (0.3%), and Other (0.0%).

The median age in the county was 42.5 years.

Renville County, North Dakota – racial and ethnic composition
Note: the US Census treats Hispanic/Latino as an ethnic category. This table excludes Latinos from the racial categories and assigns them to a separate category. Hispanics/Latinos may be of any race.

Race / ethnicity (NH = non-Hispanic)	Pop. 1980	Pop. 1990	Pop. 2000	Pop. 2010	Pop. 2020
White alone (NH)	3,578 (99.17%)	3,106 (98.29%)	2,535 (97.13%)	2,401 (97.21%)	2,146 (94.04%)
Black or African American alone (NH)	0 (0.00%)	14 (0.44%)	6 (0.23%)	2 (0.08%)	5 (0.22%)
Native American or Alaska Native alone (NH)	7 (0.19%)	23 (0.73%)	16 (0.61%)	9 (0.36%)	14 (0.61%)
Asian alone (NH)	9 (0.25%)	11 (0.35%)	12 (0.46%)	5 (0.20%)	0 (0.00%)
Pacific Islander alone (NH)	—	—	0 (0.00%)	0 (0.00%)	0 (0.00%)
Other race alone (NH)	3 (0.08%)	0 (0.00%)	3 (0.11%)	0 (0.00%)	2 (0.09%)
Mixed race or multiracial (NH)	—	—	19 (0.73%)	29 (1.17%)	78 (3.42%)
Hispanic or Latino (any race)	11 (0.30%)	6 (0.19%)	19 (0.73%)	24 (0.97%)	37 (1.62%)
Total	3,608 (100.00%)	3,160 (100.00%)	2,610 (100.00%)	2,470 (100.00%)	2,282 (100.00%)

=== 2024 estimate ===
As of the 2024 estimate, there were 2,376 people and 922 households residing in the county. There were 1,312 housing units at an average density of 1.50 per square mile (0.6/km^{2}). The racial makeup of the county was 96.1% White (95.4% NH White), 0.4% African American, 0.4% Native American, 0.4% Asian, 0.0% Pacific Islander, _% from some other races and 2.5% from two or more races. Hispanic or Latino people of any race were 0.9% of the population.

=== 2020 census ===
As of the 2020 census, the county had a population of 2,282, 982 households, and 638 families residing in the county; the population density was 2.60 inhabitants per square mile (1.0/km^{2}), and there were 1,282 housing units at an average density of 1.46 per square mile (0.6/km^{2}).

Of the residents, 22.1% were under the age of 18 and 22.4% were 65 years of age or older; the median age was 46.6 years. For every 100 females there were 111.7 males, and for every 100 females age 18 and over there were 109.4 males.

The racial makeup of the county was 94.7% White, 0.2% Black or African American, 0.7% American Indian and Alaska Native, 0.0% Asian, 0.3% from some other race, and 4.1% from two or more races. Hispanic or Latino residents of any race comprised 1.6% of the population.

There were 982 households in the county, of which 25.4% had children under the age of 18 living with them and 15.4% had a female householder with no spouse or partner present. About 29.8% of all households were made up of individuals and 12.2% had someone living alone who was 65 years of age or older.

There were 1,282 housing units, of which 23.4% were vacant. Among occupied housing units, 81.0% were owner-occupied and 19.0% were renter-occupied. The homeowner vacancy rate was 4.0% and the rental vacancy rate was 16.2%.

=== 2010 census ===
As of the 2010 census, there were 2,470 people, 1,061 households, and 685 families residing in the county. The population density was 2.82 inhabitants per square mile (1.1/km^{2}). There were 1,386 housing units at an average density of 1.58 per square mile (0.6/km^{2}). The racial makeup of the county was 97.94% White, 0.08% African American, 0.40% Native American, 0.20% Asian, 0.00% Pacific Islander, 0.20% from some other races and 1.17% from two or more races. Hispanic or Latino people of any race were 0.97% of the population.

In terms of ancestry, 39.5% were German, 39.1% were Norwegian, 11.6% were Irish, 9.7% were English, 9.5% were Swedish, and 2.3% were American.

There were 1,061 households, 25.8% had children under the age of 18 living with them, 56.7% were married couples living together, 5.1% had a female householder with no husband present, 35.4% were non-families, and 30.9% of all households were made up of individuals. The average household size was 2.28 and the average family size was 2.85. The median age was 45.4 years.

The median income for a household in the county was $49,583 and the median income for a family was $63,068. Males had a median income of $39,950 versus $25,469 for females. The per capita income for the county was $26,856. About 3.8% of families and 5.9% of the population were below the poverty line, including 5.9% of those under age 18 and 9.6% of those age 65 or over.

== Communities ==
=== Cities ===
- Glenburn
- Grano
- Loraine
- Mohall (county seat)
- Sherwood
- Tolley

=== Unincorporated communities ===
- Chola
- Greene
- Grover
- Norma
- Rockford
- White Ash

=== Townships ===
- Brandon
- Callahan
- Clay
- Colquhoun
- Eden Valley
- Ensign
- Fairbanks
- Grassland
- Grover
- Hamerly
- Hamlet
- Hurley
- Ivanhoe
- Lockwood
- McKinney
- Muskego
- Plain
- Prescott
- Prosperity
- Rockford
- Roosevelt
- Stafford
- Van Buren
- White Ash

== Politics ==
Renville County voters have voted Republican in every national election since 1976 (as of 2024).

United States presidential election results for Renville County, North Dakota
Year	Republican		Democratic		Third party(ies)	
Year	No.	%	No.	%	No.	%
1912	224	17.58%	420	32.97%	630	49.45%
1916	532	31.54%	1,012	59.99%	143	8.48%
1920	1,987	73.65%	581	21.53%	130	4.82%
1924	649	32.18%	120	5.95%	1,248	61.87%
1928	1,473	55.09%	1,174	43.90%	27	1.01%
1932	689	25.23%	1,969	72.10%	73	2.67%
1936	611	21.36%	1,766	61.73%	484	16.92%
1940	1,202	47.03%	1,298	50.78%	56	2.19%
1944	1,046	48.34%	1,095	50.60%	23	1.06%
1948	812	46.61%	838	48.11%	92	5.28%
1952	1,571	66.57%	767	32.50%	22	0.93%
1956	1,035	50.22%	1,025	49.73%	1	0.05%
1960	1,012	45.38%	1,217	54.57%	1	0.04%
1964	640	32.05%	1,356	67.90%	1	0.05%
1968	851	46.86%	880	48.46%	85	4.68%
1972	1,121	61.09%	702	38.26%	12	0.65%
1976	812	43.99%	1,008	54.60%	26	1.41%
1980	1,154	62.65%	570	30.94%	118	6.41%
1984	1,163	65.56%	592	33.37%	19	1.07%
1988	893	51.03%	837	47.83%	20	1.14%
1992	655	39.22%	580	34.73%	435	26.05%
1996	576	42.54%	562	41.51%	216	15.95%
2000	820	61.56%	443	33.26%	69	5.18%
2004	953	64.87%	497	33.83%	19	1.29%
2008	799	59.36%	505	37.52%	42	3.12%
2012	851	66.59%	398	31.14%	29	2.27%
2016	993	76.80%	201	15.55%	99	7.66%
2020	1,065	80.74%	220	16.68%	34	2.58%
2024	993	82.20%	179	14.82%	36	2.98%

== Education ==
School districts include:

- Mohall-Lansford-Sherwood Public School District 1
- Lewis and Clark Public School District 161
- Glenburn Public School District 26
- Kenmare Public School District 28
- United Public School District 7

== See also ==
- National Register of Historic Places listings in Renville County, North Dakota
