= Deering, North Dakota =

Deering
- City
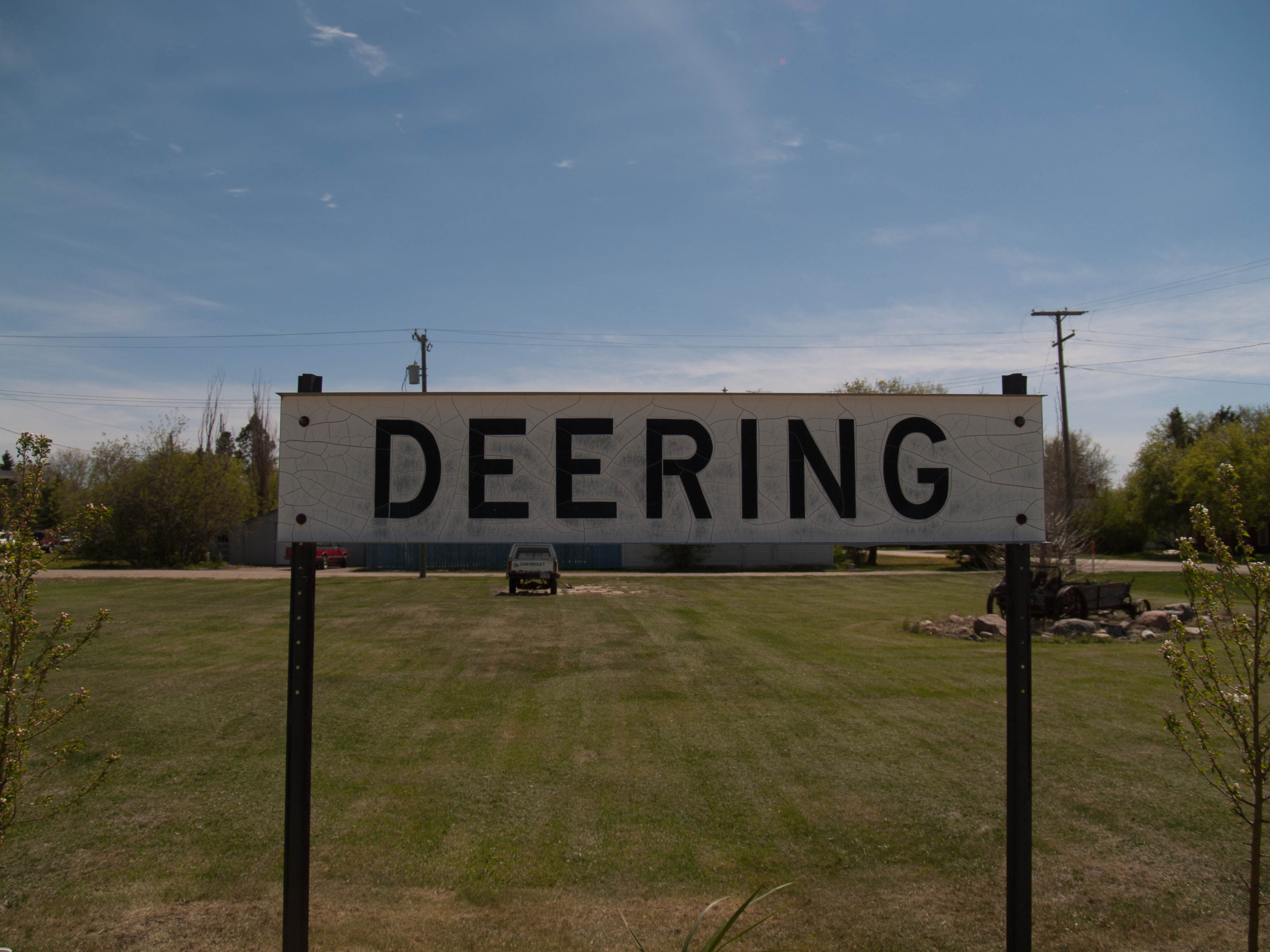
- Sign in Deering

- Location of Deering, North Dakota
- Coordinates: 48°23′45″N 101°02′59″W
- Country: United States
- State: North Dakota
- County: McHenry
- Founded: 1903

Government
  - Mayor: Ralph Groth

Area
  - Total: 0.085 sq mi (0.22 km^{2})
  - Land: 0.085 sq mi (0.22 km^{2})
  - Water: 0 sq mi (0.00 km^{2})
- Elevation: 1,545 ft (471 m)

Population (2020)
  - Total: 94
  - Estimate (2022): 91
  - Density: 1,121.2/sq mi (432.89/km^{2})
- Time zone: UTC-6 (Central (CST))
  - Summer (DST): UTC-5 (CDT)
- ZIP code: 58731
- Area code: 701
- FIPS code: 38-18620
- GNIS feature ID: 1035987
- Website: deeringnd.com

Deering is a city in McHenry County, North Dakota, United States. The population was 94 at the 2020 census. It is part of the Minot Micropolitan Statistical Area. Deering was founded in 1903.

== Geography ==
According to the United States Census Bureau, the city has a total area of 0.07 square miles (0.18 km^{2}), all land.

== Demographics ==
Historical population
Census	Pop.	Note	%±
1910	150		—
1920	142		−5.3%
1930	192		35.2%
1940	140		−27.1%
1950	136		−2.9%
1960	117		−14.0%
1970	75		−35.9%
1980	85		13.3%
1990	99		16.5%
2000	118		19.2%
2010	98		−16.9%
2020	94		−4.1%
2022 (est.)	91		−3.2%
U.S. Decennial Census; 2020 Census

=== 2010 census ===
As of the census of 2010, there were 98 people, 40 households, and 27 families residing in the city. The population density was 1,400.0 inhabitants per square mile (540.5/km^{2}). There were 44 housing units at an average density of 628.6 per square mile (242.7/km^{2}). The racial makeup of the city was 92.9% White, 3.1% Asian, and 4.1% from two or more races. Hispanic or Latino of any race were 2.0% of the population.

There were 40 households, of which 32.5% had children under the age of 18 living with them, 52.5% were married couples living together, 10.0% had a female householder with no husband present, 5.0% had a male householder with no wife present, and 32.5% were non-families. 27.5% of all households were made up of individuals, and 5% had someone living alone who was 65 years of age or older. The average household size was 2.45 and the average family size was 2.96.

The median age in the city was 38.3 years. 22.4% of residents were under the age of 18; 9.2% were between the ages of 18 and 24; 27.5% were from 25 to 44; 29.6% were from 45 to 64; and 11.2% were 65 years of age or older. The gender makeup of the city was 54.1% male and 45.9% female.

=== 2000 census ===
As of the census of 2000, there were 118 people, 42 households, and 33 families residing in the city. The population density was 1,655.6 inhabitants per square mile (639.2/km^{2}). There were 50 housing units at an average density of 701.5 per square mile (270.9/km^{2}). The racial makeup of the city was 94.07% White, 4.24% Native American, and 1.69% from two or more races. Hispanic or Latino of any race were 2.54% of the population.

There were 42 households, out of which 40.5% had children under the age of 18 living with them, 71.4% were married couples living together, 2.4% had a female householder with no husband present, and 21.4% were non-families. 19.0% of all households were made up of individuals, and 7.1% had someone living alone who was 65 years of age or older. The average household size was 2.81 and the average family size was 3.27.

In the city, the population was spread out, with 29.7% under the age of 18, 9.3% from 18 to 24, 38.1% from 25 to 44, 16.1% from 45 to 64, and 6.8% who were 65 years of age or older. The median age was 31 years. For every 100 females, there were 114.5 males. For every 100 females age 18 and over, there were 124.3 males.

The median income for a household in the city was $38,750, and the median income for a family was $45,313. Males had a median income of $26,719 versus $14,375 for females. The per capita income for the city was $13,316. There were 2.9% of families and 10.0% of the population living below the poverty line, including 20.0% of under eighteens and none of those over 64.

== Climate ==
This climatic region is typified by large seasonal temperature differences, with warm to hot (and often humid) summers and cold (sometimes severely cold) winters. According to the Köppen Climate Classification system, Deering has a humid continental climate, abbreviated "Dfb" on climate maps.
