= Bergen, North Dakota =

- City
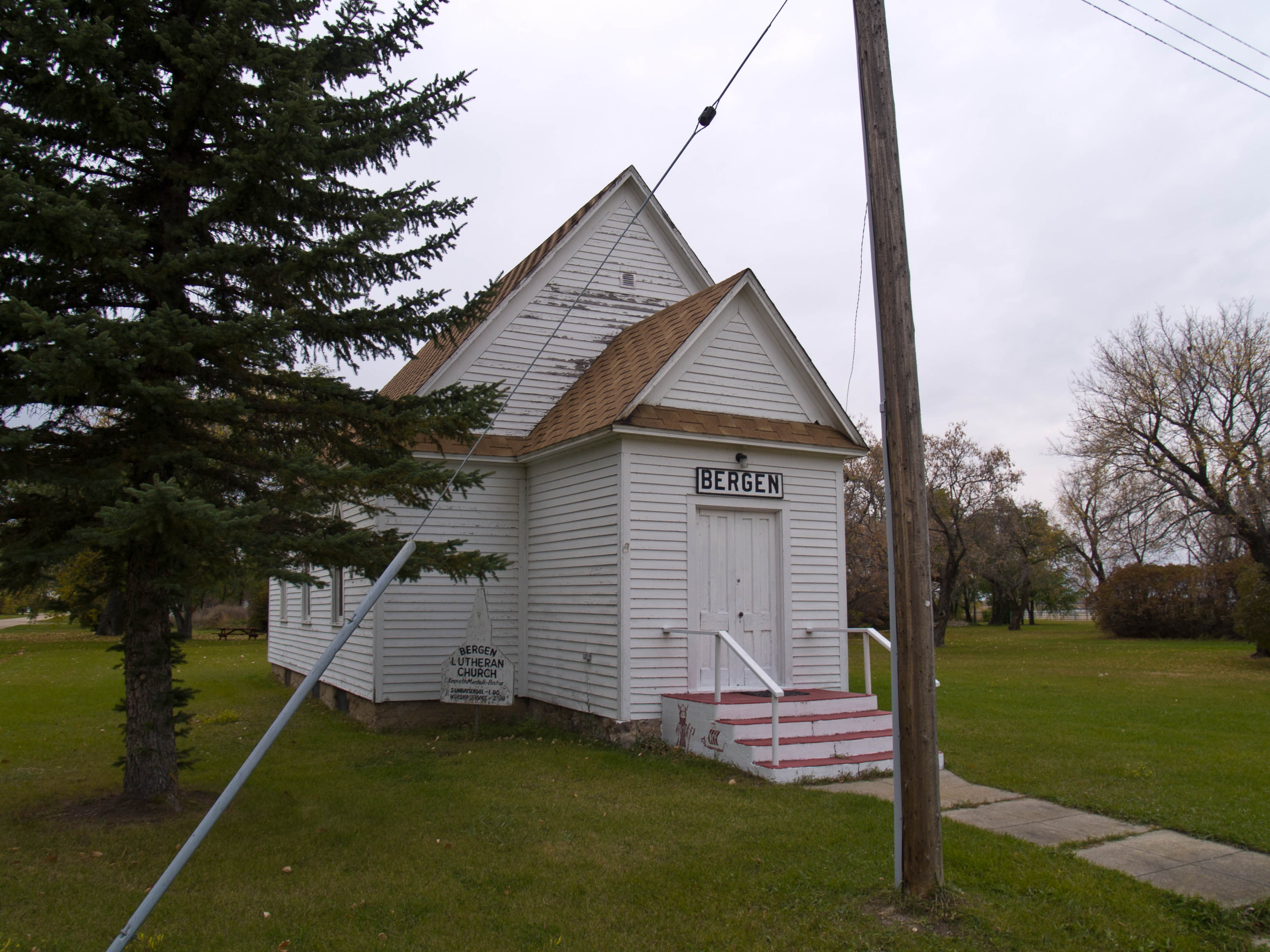
- Bergen Lutheran Church in Bergen

- Coordinates: 48°00′13″N 100°43′12″W
- Country: United States
- State: North Dakota
- County: McHenry
- Founded: 1905

Area
  - Total: 0.75 sq mi (1.94 km^{2})
  - Land: 0.75 sq mi (1.94 km^{2})
  - Water: 0 sq mi (0.00 km^{2})
- Elevation: 1,572 ft (479 m)

Population (2020)
  - Total: 10
  - Estimate (2024): 11
  - Density: 13.3/sq mi (5.15/km^{2})
- Time zone: UTC–6 (Central (CST))
  - Summer (DST): UTC–5 (CDT)
- ZIP Code: 58792
- Area code: 701
- FIPS code: 38-06180
- GNIS feature ID: 1035928

Bergen is a city in McHenry County, North Dakota, United States. The population was 10 at the 2020 census. It is part of the Minot Micropolitan Statistical Area. Bergen was founded in 1905 and named after Bergen, Norway.

== Geography ==
According to the United States Census Bureau, the city has a total area of 0.74 square miles (1.92 km^{2}), all land.

== Demographics ==
Historical population
Census	Pop.	Note	%±
1930	98		—
1940	67		−31.6%
1950	51		−23.9%
1960	52		2.0%
1970	24		−53.8%
1980	24		0.0%
1990	15		−37.5%
2000	11		−26.7%
2010	7		−36.4%
2020	10		42.9%
2024 (est.)	11		10.0%
U.S. Decennial Census; 2020 Census

=== 2010 census ===
As of the census of 2010, there were 7 people, 4 households, and 3 families residing in the city. The population density was 9.5 inhabitants per square mile (3.7/km^{2}). There were 10 housing units at an average density of 13.5 per square mile (5.2/km^{2}). The racial makeup of the city was 100.0% White.

There were 4 households, of which 75.0% were married couples living together and 25.0% were non-families. 25.0% of all households were made up of individuals, and 25% had someone living alone who was 65 years of age or older. The average household size was 1.75 and the average family size was 2.00.

The median age in the city was 59.5 years. 0.0% of residents were under the age of 18; 0.0% were between the ages of 18 and 24; 0.0% were from 25 to 44; 57.2% were from 45 to 64; and 42.9% were 65 years of age or older. The gender makeup of the city was 57.1% male and 42.9% female.

=== 2000 census ===
As of the census of 2000, there were 11 people, 4 households, and 3 families residing in the city. The population density was 15.4 people per square mile (6.0/km^{2}). There were 11 housing units at an average density of 15.4 per square mile (6.0/km^{2}). The racial makeup of the city was 100.00% White.

There were 4 households, out of which 50.0% had children under the age of 18 living with them, 50.0% were married couples living together, and 25.0% were non-families. 25.0% of all households were made up of individuals, and none had someone living alone who was 65 years of age or older. The average household size was 2.75 and the average family size was 3.33.

In the city, the population was spread out, with 27.3% under the age of 18, 18.2% from 18 to 24, 9.1% from 25 to 44, 27.3% from 45 to 64, and 18.2% who were 65 years of age or older. The median age was 42 years. For every 100 females, there were 120.0 males. For every 100 females age 18 and over, there were 166.7 males.

The median income for a household in the city was $40,625, and the median income for a family was $8,750. Males had a median income of $41,250 versus $0 for females. The per capita income for the city was $22,025. Below the poverty line were 50.0% of people, 100.0% of families, 100.0% of those under 18 and none of those over 64.
