= Prairie Rose, North Dakota =

- City
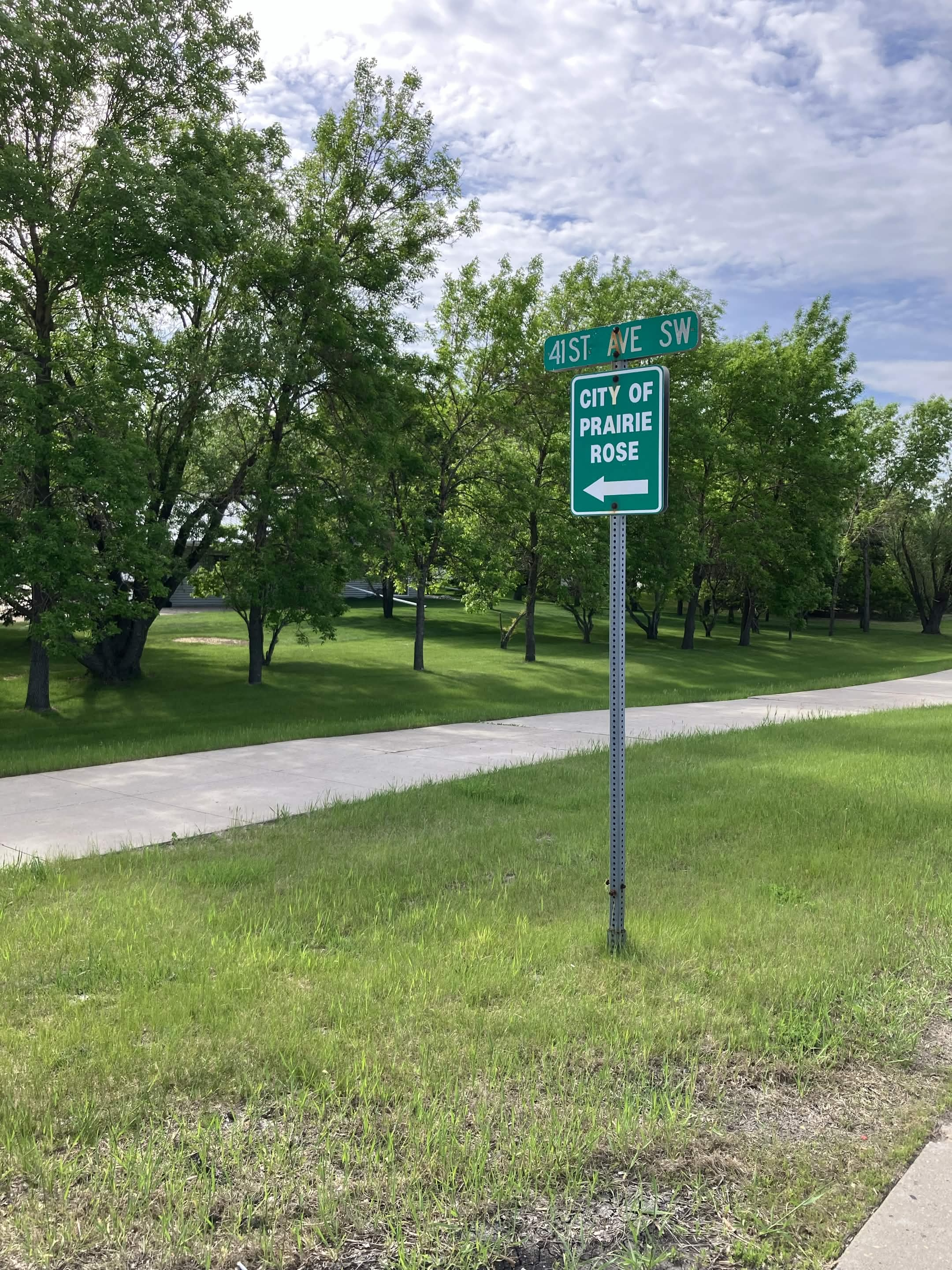

- Location of Prairie Rose, North Dakota
- Coordinates: 46°49′02″N 96°50′07″W
- Country: United States
- State: North Dakota
- County: Cass
- Founded: 1975
- Incorporated: 1978

Government
  - Mayor: Rick Callens

Area
  - Total: 0.042 sq mi (0.11 km^{2})
  - Land: 0.042 sq mi (0.11 km^{2})
  - Water: 0 sq mi (0.00 km^{2})
- Elevation: 906 ft (276 m)

Population (2020)
  - Total: 56
  - Estimate (2022): 56
  - Density: 1,373.5/sq mi (530.32/km^{2})
- Time zone: UTC-6 (Central (CST))
  - Summer (DST): UTC-5 (CDT)
- ZIP code: 58104
- Area code: 701
- FIPS code: 38-64320
- GNIS feature ID: 1036229

Prairie Rose is a city in Cass County, North Dakota, United States. The population was 56 at the 2020 census. The city is an enclave suburb of Fargo. Prairie Rose was founded in 1975 and it was incorporated in 1978. There are 21 homes in the city.

There was an effort to merge with Fargo in 1996, but the vote by Prairie Rose residents failed.

== Geography ==
According to the United States Census Bureau, the city has a total area of 0.04 square miles (0.10 km^{2}), all land.

== Demographics ==
Historical population
Census	Pop.	Note	%±
1980	76		—
1990	78		2.6%
2000	68		−12.8%
2010	73		7.4%
2020	56		−23.3%
2022 (est.)	56		0.0%
U.S. Decennial Census; 2020 Census

=== 2010 census ===
As of the census of 2010, there were 73 people, 25 households, and 21 families living in the city. The population density was 1,825.0 inhabitants per square mile (704.6/km^{2}). There were 26 housing units at an average density of 650.0 per square mile (251.0/km^{2}). The racial makeup of the city was 100.0% White.

There were 25 households, of which 44.0% had children under the age of 18 living with them, 76.0% were married couples living together, 4.0% had a female householder with no husband present, 4.0% had a male householder with no wife present, and 16.0% were non-families. 12.0% of all households were made up of individuals. The average household size was 2.92 and the average family size was 3.14.

The median age in the city was 41.8 years. 32.9% of residents were under the age of 18; 5.4% were between the ages of 18 and 24; 20.5% were from 25 to 44; 38.3% were from 45 to 64; and 2.7% were 65 years of age or older. The gender makeup of the city was 50.7% male and 49.3% female.

=== 2000 census ===
As of the census of 2000, there were 68 people, 20 households and 19 families living in the city. The population density was 1,253.2 inhabitants per square mile (483.9/km^{2}). There were 20 housing units at an average density of 368.6 per square mile (142.3/km^{2}). The racial makeup of the city was 100.00% White.

There were 20 households, of which 65.0% had children under the age of 18 living with them, 95.0% were married couples living together, and 5.0% were non-families. 5.0% of all households were made up of individuals, and none had someone living alone who was 65 years of age or older. The average household size was 3.40 and the average family size was 3.53.

Age distribution was 35.3% under the age of 18, 7.4% from 18 to 24, 25.0% from 25 to 44, 32.4% from 45 to 64. The median age was 36 years. For every 100 females, there were 100.0 males. For every 100 females age 18 and over, there were 100.0 males.

The median household income was $75,000, and the median family income was $75,000. Males had a median income of $41,786 versus $25,000 for females. The per capita income for the city was $22,334. None of the population and none of the families were below the poverty line.
