= Clifford, North Dakota =

- City
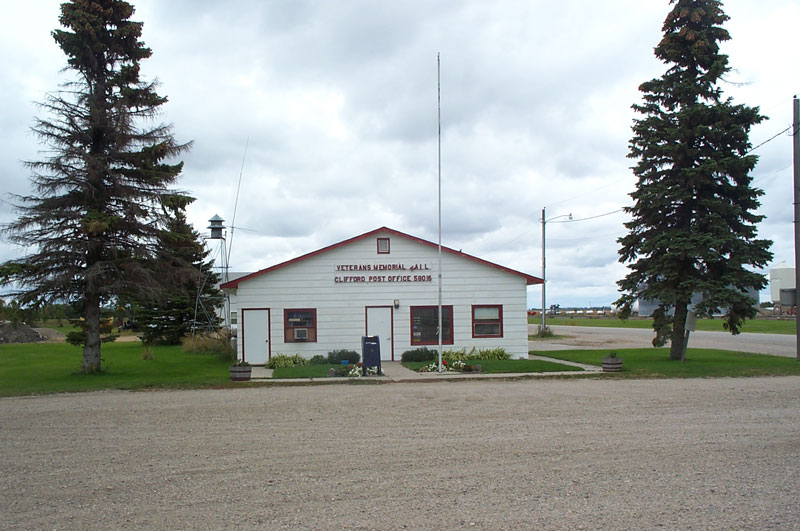
- Post Office and Vet's Hall

- Location of Clifford, North Dakota
- Coordinates: 47°20′54″N 97°24′36″W
- Country: United States
- State: North Dakota
- County: Traill
- Founded: 1883

Area
  - Total: 0.14 sq mi (0.36 km^{2})
  - Land: 0.14 sq mi (0.36 km^{2})
  - Water: 0 sq mi (0.00 km^{2})
- Elevation: 1,056 ft (322 m)

Population (2020)
  - Total: 30
  - Estimate (2022): 31
  - Density: 213.3/sq mi (82.34/km^{2})
- Time zone: UTC-6 (Central (CST))
  - Summer (DST): UTC-5 (CDT)
- ZIP code: 58016
- Area code: 701
- FIPS code: 38-14740
- GNIS feature ID: 1035972

Clifford is a city in Traill County, North Dakota, United States. The population was 30 at the 2020 census. Clifford was founded in 1883.

== Geography ==
According to the United States Census Bureau, the city has a total area of 0.14 square miles (0.36 km^{2}), all land.

== Demographics ==
Historical population
Census	Pop.	Note	%±
1950	158		—
1960	109		−31.0%
1970	84		−22.9%
1980	51		−39.3%
1990	51		0.0%
2000	51		0.0%
2010	44		−13.7%
2020	30		−31.8%
2022 (est.)	31		3.3%
U.S. Decennial Census; 2020 Census

=== 2010 census ===
As of the census of 2010, there were 44 people, 21 households, and 10 families residing in the city. The population density was 314.3 inhabitants per square mile (121.4/km^{2}). There were 23 housing units at an average density of 164.3 per square mile (63.4/km^{2}). The racial makeup of the city was 100.0% White.

There were 21 households, of which 28.6% had children under the age of 18 living with them, 47.6% were married couples living together, and 52.4% were non-families. 47.6% of all households were made up of individuals, and 28.5% had someone living alone who was 65 years of age or older. The average household size was 2.10 and the average family size was 3.10.

The median age in the city was 47 years. 22.7% of residents were under the age of 18; 4.6% were between the ages of 18 and 24; 20.4% were from 25 to 44; 24.9% were from 45 to 64; and 27.3% were 65 years of age or older. The gender makeup of the city was 47.7% male and 52.3% female.

=== 2000 census ===
At the 2000 census, there were 51 people, 21 households and 12 families residing in the city. The population density was 366.9 inhabitants per square mile (141.7/km^{2}). There were 26 housing units at an average density of 187.1 per square mile (72.2/km^{2}). The racial makeup of the city was 100.00% White.

There were 21 households, of which 28.6% had children under the age of 18 living with them, 61.9% were married couples living together, and 38.1% were non-families. 28.6% of all households were made up of individuals, and 9.5% had someone living alone who was 65 years of age or older. The average household size was 2.43 and the average family size was 3.08.

Age distribution was 23.5% under the age of 18, 13.7% from 18 to 24, 35.3% from 25 to 44, 17.6% from 45 to 64, and 9.8% who were 65 years of age or older. The median age was 32 years. For every 100 females, there were 155.0 males. For every 100 females age 18 and over, there were 178.6 males.

The median household income was $43,750, and the median family was $39,375. Males had a median income of $28,750 versus $16,250 for females. The per capita income for the city was $16,932. None of the population and none of the families were below the poverty line.

== Education ==
It is in the May-Port CG Public School District 14.
