= Glenburn, North Dakota =

- City
- Location of Glenburn, North Dakota
- Coordinates: 48°30′49″N 101°13′15″W
- Country: United States
- State: North Dakota
- County: Renville
- Founded: 1903

Government
  - Mayor: Eric Folstad

Area
  - Total: 0.30 sq mi (0.78 km^{2})
  - Land: 0.30 sq mi (0.78 km^{2})
  - Water: 0 sq mi (0.00 km^{2})
- Elevation: 1,562 ft (476 m)

Population (2020)
  - Total: 404
  - Estimate (2022): 394
  - Density: 1,342.8/sq mi (518.46/km^{2})
- Time zone: UTC-6 (Central (CST))
  - Summer (DST): UTC-5 (CDT)
- ZIP code: 58740
- Area code: 701
- FIPS code: 38-30580
- GNIS feature ID: 1036056
- Website: glenburn.municipalimpact.com

Glenburn is a city in Renville County, North Dakota, United States. The population was 404 at the 2020 census. It is part of the Minot Metropolitan Statistical Area. Glenburn was founded in 1903.

== Geography ==
According to the United States Census Bureau, the city has a total area of 0.25 square miles (0.65 km^{2}), all land.

Glenburn is located 3 miles east of US Highway 83, 10 miles north of Minot Air Force Base, North Dakota, and 23 miles north of Minot, North Dakota

== Demographics ==
Historical population
Census	Pop.	Note	%±
1910	268		—
1920	228		−14.9%
1930	263		15.4%
1940	190		−27.8%
1950	281		47.9%
1960	363		29.2%
1970	381		5.0%
1980	454		19.2%
1990	439		−3.3%
2000	374		−14.8%
2010	380		1.6%
2020	404		6.3%
2022 (est.)	394		−2.5%
U.S. Decennial Census; 2020 Census

=== 2010 census ===
As of the census of 2010, there were 380 people, 163 households, and 100 families residing in the city. The population density was 1,520.0 inhabitants per square mile (586.9/km^{2}). There were 183 housing units at an average density of 732.0 per square mile (282.6/km^{2}). The racial makeup of the city was 95.3% White, 0.3% Native American, 0.8% Asian, 0.5% from other races, and 3.2% from two or more races. Hispanic or Latino of any race were 2.1% of the population.

There were 163 households, of which 25.8% had children under the age of 18 living with them, 55.2% were married couples living together, 5.5% had a female householder with no husband present, 0.6% had a male householder with no wife present, and 38.7% were non-families. 31.3% of all households were made up of individuals, and 6.7% had someone living alone who was 65 years of age or older. The average household size was 2.33 and the average family size was 2.98.

The median age in the city was 33.6 years. 23.7% of residents were under the age of 18; 11% were between the ages of 18 and 24; 27.6% were from 25 to 44; 30% were from 45 to 64; and 7.6% were 65 years of age or older. The gender makeup of the city was 52.4% male and 47.6% female.

=== 2000 census ===
As of the census of 2000, there were 374 people, 150 households, and 102 families residing in the city. The population density was 1,440.2 inhabitants per square mile (556.1/km^{2}). There were 181 housing units at an average density of 697.0 per square mile (269.1/km^{2}). The racial makeup of the city was 94.92% White, 0.53% African American, 0.80% Native American, 1.07% Asian, 0.53% from other races, and 2.14% from two or more races. Hispanic or Latino of any race were 4.01% of the population.

There were 150 households, out of which 36.7% had children under the age of 18 living with them, 57.3% were married couples living together, 7.3% had a female householder with no husband present, and 32.0% were non-families. 27.3% of all households were made up of individuals, and 8.0% had someone living alone who was 65 years of age or older. The average household size was 2.49 and the average family size was 3.08.

In the city, the population was spread out, with 28.6% under the age of 18, 8.3% from 18 to 24, 33.2% from 25 to 44, 21.1% from 45 to 64, and 8.8% who were 65 years of age or older. The median age was 34 years. For every 100 females, there were 112.5 males. For every 100 females age 18 and over, there were 110.2 males.

The median income for a household in the city was $34,375, and the median income for a family was $39,375. Males had a median income of $25,625 versus $19,000 for females. The per capita income for the city was $17,734. About 8.4% of families and 11.7% of the population were below the poverty line, including 20.8% of those under age 18 and 5.9% of those age 65 or over.
