= North River, North Dakota =

- City
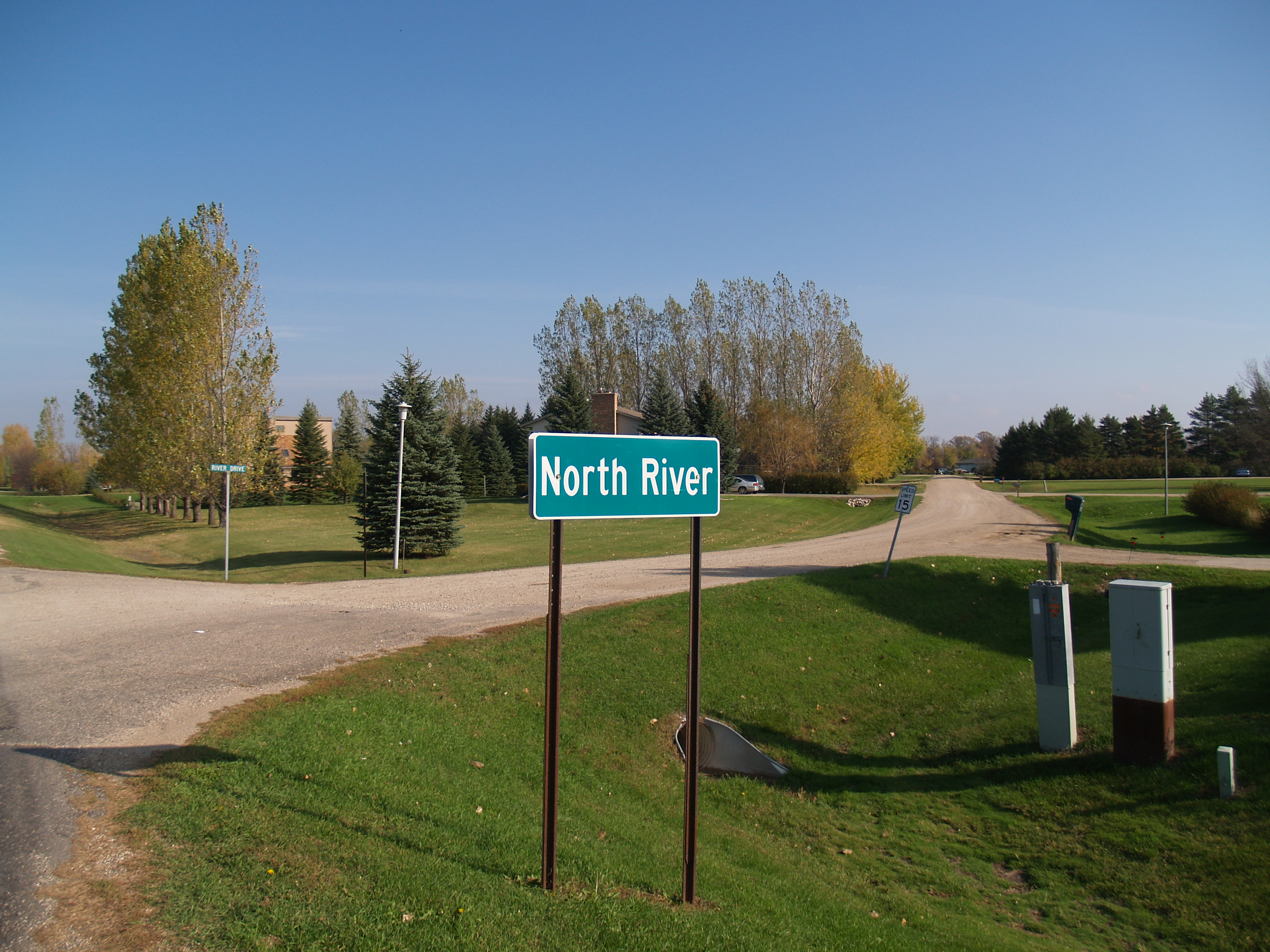
- Sign in North River

- Location of North River, North Dakota
- Coordinates: 46°57′01″N 96°48′08″W
- Country: United States
- State: North Dakota
- County: Cass
- Founded: 1973

Government
  - Mayor: Troy Durham

Area
  - Total: 0.062 sq mi (0.16 km^{2})
  - Land: 0.062 sq mi (0.16 km^{2})
  - Water: 0.0039 sq mi (0.01 km^{2})
- Elevation: 896 ft (273 m)

Population (2020)
  - Total: 55
  - Estimate (2024): 56
  - Density: 905/sq mi (349.3/km^{2})
- Time zone: UTC-6 (Central (CST))
  - Summer (DST): UTC-5 (CDT)
- ZIP code: 58102
- Area code: 701
- FIPS code: 38-58120
- GNIS feature ID: 1036197
- Website: northrivernd.com

North River is a city in Cass County, North Dakota, United States. The population was 55 at the 2020 census. North River was founded in 1973. It is a suburb/bedroom community directly adjacent to the city of Fargo.

== Geography ==
According to the United States Census Bureau, the city has a total area of 0.07 square miles (0.18 km^{2}), of which 0.06 square miles (0.16 km^{2}) is land and 0.01 square miles (0.03 km^{2}) is water.

== Demographics ==
Historical population
Census	Pop.	Note	%±
1980	65		—
1990	68		4.6%
2000	65		−4.4%
2010	56		−13.8%
2020	55		−1.8%
2024 (est.)	56		1.8%
U.S. Decennial Census; 2020 Census

=== 2010 census ===
As of the census of 2010, there were 56 people, 23 households, and 21 families living in the city. The population density was 933.3 inhabitants per square mile (360.3/km^{2}). There were 24 housing units at an average density of 400.0 per square mile (154.4/km^{2}). The racial makeup of the city was 100.0% White.

There were 23 households, of which 26.1% had children under the age of 18 living with them, 78.3% were married couples living together, 8.7% had a female householder with no husband present, 4.3% had a male householder with no wife present, and 8.7% were non-families. 8.7% of all households were made up of individuals. The average household size was 2.43 and the average family size was 2.48.

The median age in the city was 47.5 years. 17.9% of residents were under the age of 18; 3.6% were between the ages of 18 and 24; 23.3% were from 25 to 44; 48.2% were from 45 to 64; and 7.1% were 65 years of age or older. The gender makeup of the city was 53.6% male and 46.4% female.

=== 2000 census ===
As of the census of 2000, there were 65 people, 19 households, and 19 families living in the city. The population density was 1,017.5 inhabitants per square mile (392.9/km^{2}). There were 19 housing units at an average density of 297.4 per square mile (114.8/km^{2}). The racial makeup of the city was 100.00% White.

There were 19 households, out of which 63.2% had children under the age of 18 living with them, 89.5% were married couples living together, 10.5% had a female householder with no husband present, and 0.0% were non-families. No households were made up of individuals, and none had someone living alone who was 65 years of age or older. The average household size was 3.42 and the average family size was 3.37.

In the city, the population was spread out, with 32.3% under the age of 18, 7.7% from 18 to 24, 23.1% from 25 to 44, and 36.9% from 45 to 64. The median age was 38 years. For every 100 females, there were 140.7 males. For every 100 females age 18 and over, there were 120.0 males.

The median income for a household in the city was $80,000, and the median income for a family was $80,000. Males had a median income of $41,250 versus $29,583 for females. The per capita income for the city was $22,584. None of the population and none of the families were below the poverty line.
