= Hampden, North Dakota =

- City
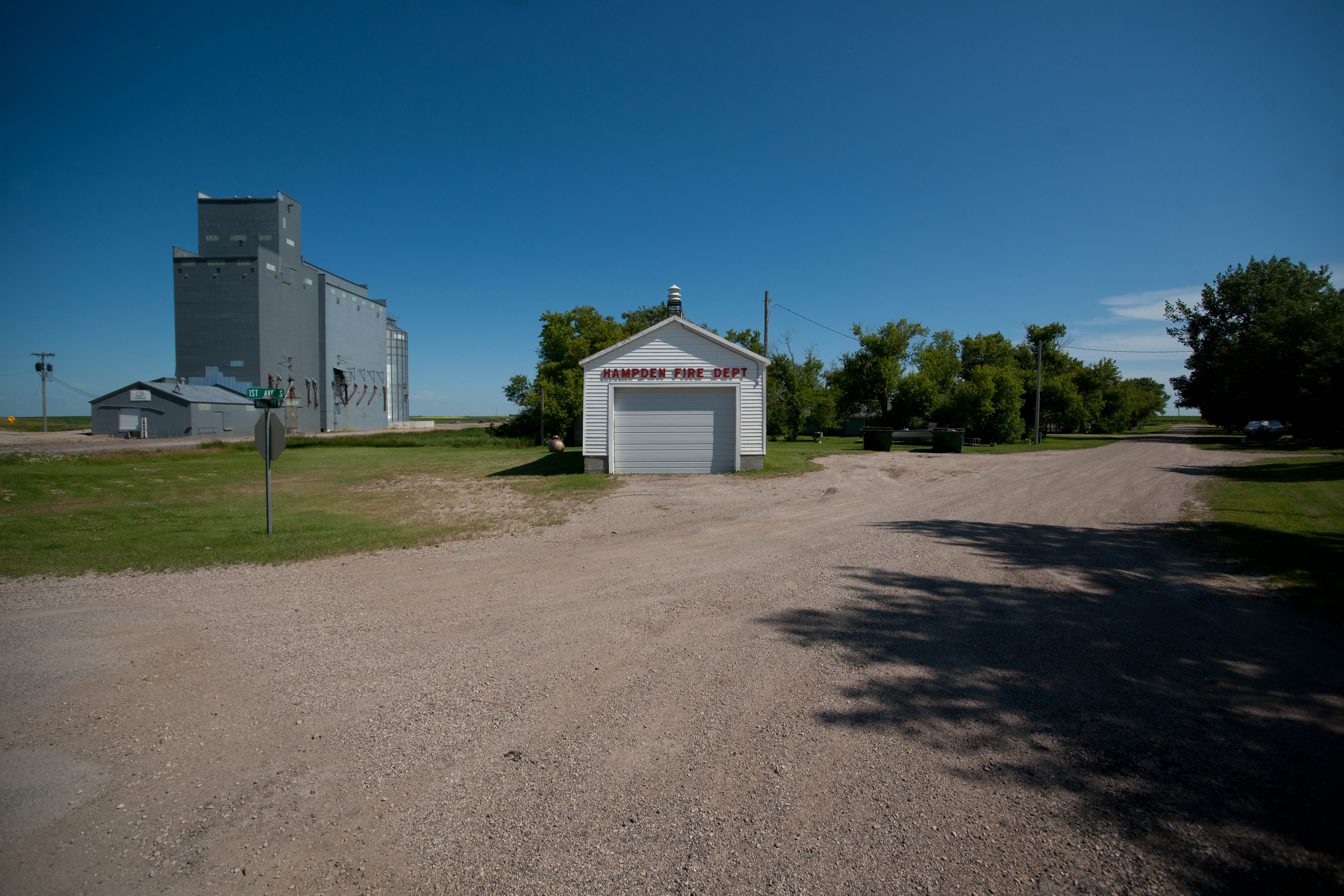
- Hampden Fire Department, Hampden, North Dakota
- Interactive map of Hampden, North Dakota
- Location within North Dakota Location within the United States
- Coordinates: 48.5396°N 98.6543°W
- Country: United States
- State: North Dakota
- County: Ramsey
- Founded: 1903

Area
  - Total: 0.172 sq mi (0.445 km^{2})
  - Land: 0.172 sq mi (0.445 km^{2})
  - Water: 0 sq mi (0.000 km^{2}) 0.00%
- Elevation: 1,565 ft (477 m)

Population (2020)
  - Total: 29
  - Estimate (2025): 28
  - Density: 170/sq mi (65/km^{2})
- Time zone: UTC–6 (Central (CST))
  - Summer (DST): UTC–5 (CDT)
- ZIP Code: 58338
- Area code: 701
- FIPS code: 38-34860
- GNIS feature ID: 1036076
- Website: hampden.wordpress.com

Hampden is a city in Ramsey County, North Dakota, United States. The population was 29 as of the 2020 census, and was estimated at 28 in 2025.

== History ==
Hampden was founded in 1903.

== Geography ==
According to the United States Census Bureau, the city has a total area of 0.172 square miles (0.45 km^{2}), all land.

== Demographics ==
Historical population
Census	Pop.	Note	%±
1920	199		—
1930	222		11.6%
1940	193		−13.1%
1950	203		5.2%
1960	159		−21.7%
1970	114		−28.3%
1980	126		10.5%
1990	89		−29.4%
2000	60		−32.6%
2010	48		−20.0%
2020	29		−39.6%
2025 (est.)	28		−3.4%
U.S. Decennial Census; 2020 Census

=== 2020 census ===
As of the 2020 census, there were 29 people, 16 households, and 5 families residing in the city.

=== 2010 census ===
As of the 2010 census, there were 48 people, 26 households, and 11 families residing in the city. The population density was 282.4 inhabitants per square mile (109.0/km^{2}). There were 35 housing units at an average density of 205.9 per square mile (79.5/km^{2}). The racial makeup of the city was 97.9% White and 2.1% from two or more races.

There were 26 households, of which 15.4% had children under the age of 18 living with them, 34.6% were married couples living together, 7.7% had a male householder with no wife present, and 57.7% were non-families. 53.8% of all households were made up of individuals, and 38.4% had someone living alone who was 65 years of age or older. The average household size was 1.85 and the average family size was 2.55.

The median age in the city was 53.5 years. 16.7% of residents were under the age of 18; 4.2% were between the ages of 18 and 24; 12.6% were from 25 to 44; 33.4% were from 45 to 64; and 33.3% were 65 years of age or older. The gender makeup of the city was 45.8% male and 54.2% female.

=== 2000 census ===
As of the 2000 census, there were 60 people, 34 households, and 14 families residing in the city. The population density was 348.9 inhabitants per square mile (134.7/km^{2}). There were 53 housing units at an average density of 308.2 per square mile (119.0/km^{2}). The racial makeup of the city was 100.00% White. Mayor Donald Steeves.

There were 34 households, out of which 11.8% had children under the age of 18 living with them, 41.2% were married couples living together, and 58.8% were non-families. 55.9% of all households were made up of individuals, and 26.5% had someone living alone who was 65 years of age or older. The average household size was 1.76 and the average family size was 2.71.

In the city, the population was spread out, with 15.0% under the age of 18, 6.7% from 18 to 24, 31.7% from 25 to 44, 16.7% from 45 to 64, and 30.0% who were 65 years of age or older. The median age was 42 years. For every 100 females, there were 122.2 males. For every 100 females age 18 and over, there were 121.7 males.

The median income for a household in the city was $31,250, and the median income for a family was $54,375. Males had a median income of $23,750 versus $23,750 for females. The per capita income for the city was $20,860. There were no families and 11.5% of the population living below the poverty line, including no under eighteens and none of those over 64.
