= Loraine, North Dakota =

- City
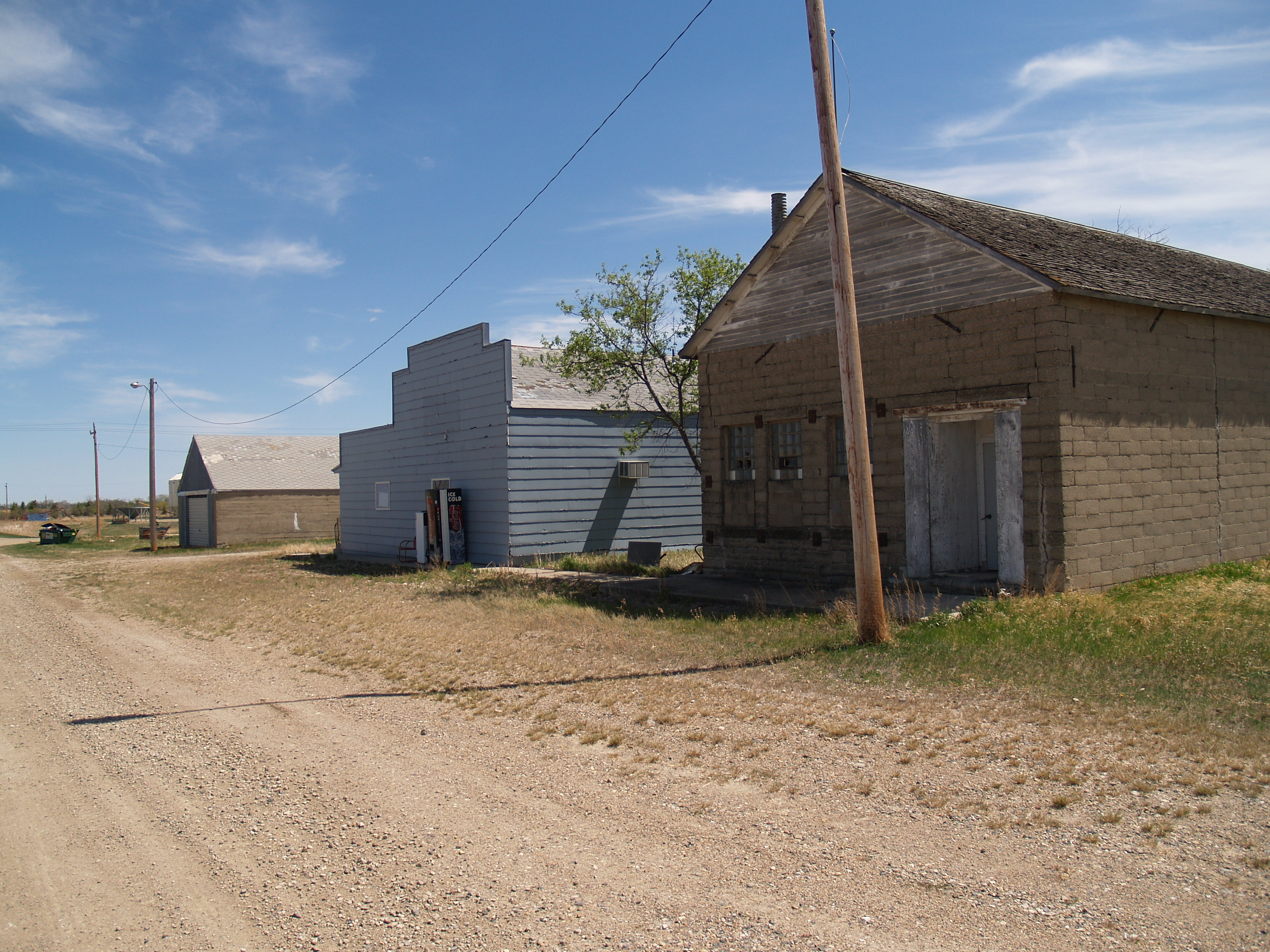
- Buildings in Loraine

- Location of Loraine, North Dakota
- Coordinates: 48°52′06″N 101°34′04″W
- Country: United States
- State: North Dakota
- County: Renville
- Founded: 1907

Government
  - Mayor: Dan Gilbraith

Area
  - Total: 0.245 sq mi (0.635 km^{2})
  - Land: 0.245 sq mi (0.635 km^{2})
  - Water: 0 sq mi (0.000 km^{2})
- Elevation: 1,621 ft (494 m)

Population (2020)
  - Total: 9
  - Estimate (2024): 9
  - Density: 36.7/sq mi (14.17/km^{2})
- Time zone: UTC–6 (Central (CST))
  - Summer (DST): UTC–5 (CDT)
- ZIP Code: 58761
- Area code: 701
- FIPS code: 38-48020
- GNIS feature ID: 1036136

Loraine is a city in Renville County, North Dakota, United States. The population was 9 at the 2020 census. It is part of the Minot Micropolitan Statistical Area.

Loraine was founded in 1907 and is said to have been named by Mohall banker Sherwood H. Sleeper (namesake of Sherwood) for Fort La Reine, one of the forts of the exploration directed by Pierre Gaultier de Varennes, sieur de La Vérendrye in the 18th century.

== Geography ==
According to the United States Census Bureau, the city has a total area of 0.245 square miles (0.63 km^{2}), all land.

== Demographics ==
Historical population
Census	Pop.	Note	%±
1920	74		—
1930	92		24.3%
1940	74		−19.6%
1950	70		−5.4%
1960	54		−22.9%
1970	33		−38.9%
1980	21		−36.4%
1990	15		−28.6%
2000	19		26.7%
2010	9		−52.6%
2020	9		0.0%
2024 (est.)	9		0.0%
U.S. Decennial Census; 2020 Census

=== 2010 census ===
As of the 2010 census, there were 9 people, 4 households, and 2 families residing in the city. The population density was 36.0 inhabitants per square mile (13.9/km^{2}). There were 7 housing units at an average density of 28.0 per square mile (10.8/km^{2}). The racial makeup of the city was 100.0% White.

There were 4 households, of which 25.0% had children under the age of 18 living with them, 50.0% were married couples living together, and 50.0% were non-families. 50.0% of all households were made up of individuals. The average household size was 2.25 and the average family size was 3.50.

The median age in the city was 49.3 years. 22.2% of residents were under the age of 18; 11.1% were between the ages of 18 and 24; 11.1% were from 25 to 44; 55.5% were from 45 to 64; and 0.0% were 65 years of age or older. The gender makeup of the city was 66.7% male and 33.3% female.

=== 2000 census ===
As of the 2000 census, there were 19 people, 8 households, and 5 families residing in the city. The population density was 78.7 inhabitants per square mile (30.4/km^{2}). There were 8 housing units at an average density of 33.1 per square mile (12.8/km^{2}). The racial makeup of the city was 100.00% White.

There were 8 households, out of which 37.5% had children under the age of 18 living with them, 62.5% were married couples living together, and 37.5% were non-families. 37.5% of all households were made up of individuals, and 25.0% had someone living alone who was 65 years of age or older. The average household size was 2.38 and the average family size was 3.20.

In the city, the population was spread out, with 31.6% under the age of 18, 21.1% from 25 to 44, 26.3% from 45 to 64, and 21.1% who were 65 years of age or older. The median age was 44 years. For every 100 females, there were 111.1 males. For every 100 females age 18 and over, there were 116.7 males.

The median income for a household in the city was $36,250, and the median income for a family was $36,250. Males had a median income of $0 versus $16,250 for females. The per capita income for the city was $7,810. There are 25.0% of families living below the poverty line and 13.3% of the population, including no under eighteens and none of those over 64.

== Businesses ==
There is one restaurant in Loraine, on Main Street, called 'The Naked Moose'.
