= Frontier, North Dakota =

- City
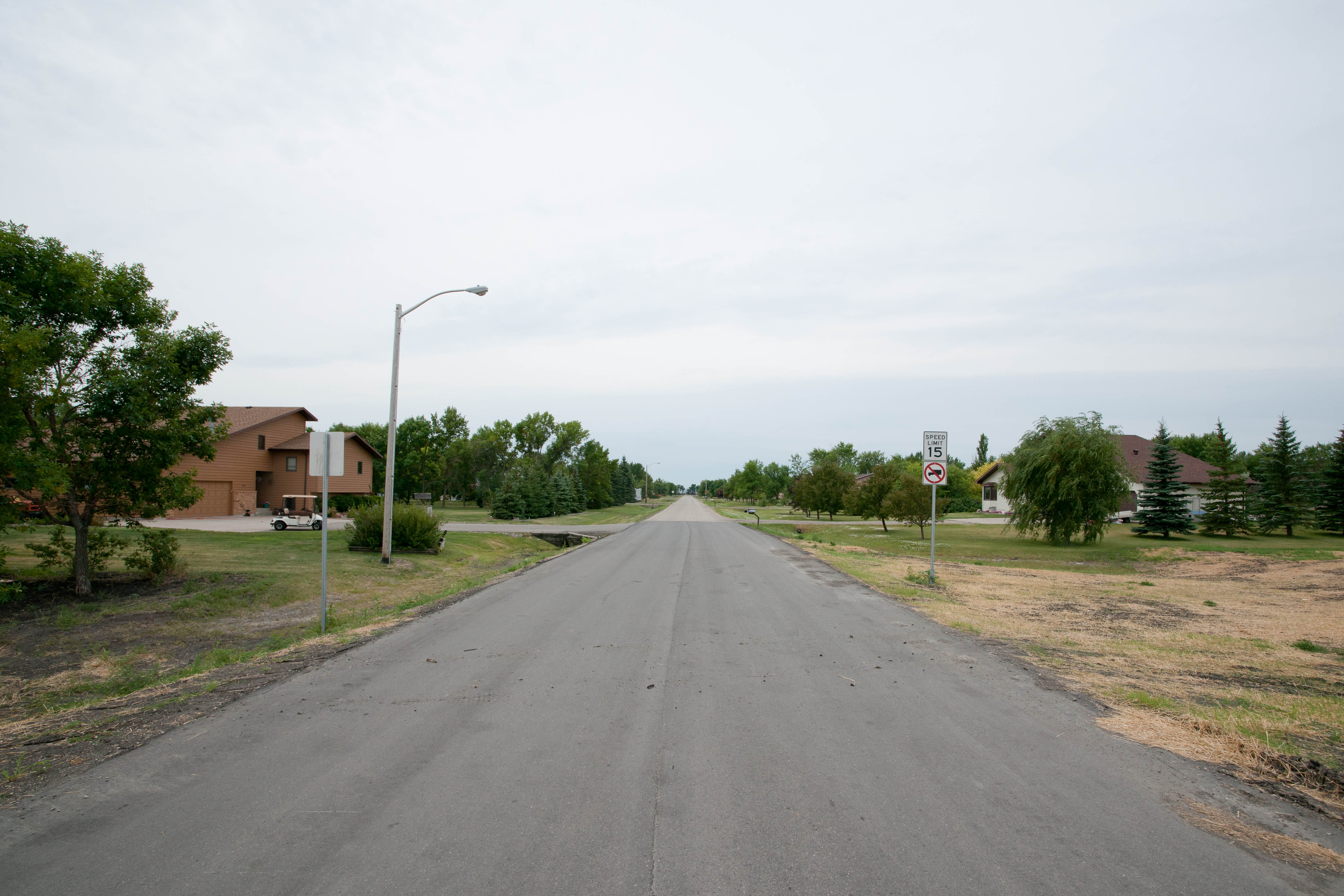
- Street in Frontier

- Location of Frontier, North Dakota
- Coordinates: 46.800275°N 96.833294°W
- Country: United States
- State: North Dakota
- County: Cass
- Founded: 1976

Government
  - Mayor: Jon Whiting

Area
  - Total: 0.188 sq mi (0.487 km^{2})
  - Land: 0.188 sq mi (0.487 km^{2})
  - Water: 0 sq mi (0.000 km^{2})
- Elevation: 906 ft (276 m)

Population (2020)
  - Total: 195
  - Estimate (2024): 196
  - Density: 1,037.6/sq mi (400.62/km^{2})
- Time zone: UTC–6 (Central (CST))
  - Summer (DST): UTC–5 (CDT)
- ZIP Code: 58104
- Area code: 701
- FIPS code: 38-28720
- GNIS feature ID: 1036046
- Website: frontier-nd.com

Frontier is a city in Cass County, North Dakota, United States. The population was 195 at the 2020 census. Frontier is located south of the city of Fargo and is located roughly six miles southwest of that city's downtown. Frontier was founded in 1976. Since Frontier's founding, the adjacent city of Fargo has grown to the point where it almost completely encompasses Frontier's city limits. Only a small gap on the city's southwest corner keeps Frontier from being a complete enclave community within Fargo's border.

== Geography ==
According to the United States Census Bureau, the city has a total area of 0.188 square miles (0.49 km^{2}), all land.

== Demographics ==
Historical population
Census	Pop.	Note	%±
1980	160		—
1990	218		36.3%
2000	273		25.2%
2010	214		−21.6%
2020	195		−8.9%
2024 (est.)	196		0.5%
U.S. Decennial Census; 2020 Census

=== 2010 census ===
As of the 2010 census, there were 214 people, 75 households, and 67 families living in the city. The population density was 1,126.3 inhabitants per square mile (434.9/km^{2}). There were 76 housing units at an average density of 400.0 per square mile (154.4/km^{2}). The racial makeup of the city was 98.6% White, 0.9% African American, and 0.5% from two or more races. Hispanic or Latino of any race were 0.5% of the population.

There were 75 households, of which 33.3% had children under the age of 18 living with them, 88.0% were married couples living together, 1.3% had a female householder with no husband present, and 10.7% were non-families. 10.7% of all households were made up of individuals, and 4% had someone living alone who was 65 years of age or older. The average household size was 2.85 and the average family size was 3.03.

The median age in the city was 43.5 years. 20.6% of residents were under the age of 18; 8.8% were between the ages of 18 and 24; 22.4% were from 25 to 44; 43.8% were from 45 to 64; and 4.2% were 65 years of age or older. The gender makeup of the city was 50.9% male and 49.1% female.

=== 2000 census ===
As of the 2000 census, there were 273 people, 78 households, and 73 families living in the city. The population density was 1,522.5 inhabitants per square mile (587.8/km^{2}). There were 78 housing units at an average density of 435.0 per square mile (168.0/km^{2}). The racial makeup of the city was 99.27% White and 0.73% African American. Hispanic or Latino of any race were 1.10% of the population.

There were 78 households, out of which 62.8% had children under the age of 18 living with them, 87.2% were married couples living together, 3.8% had a female householder with no husband present, and 6.4% were non-families. 3.8% of all households were made up of individuals, and 1.3% had someone living alone who was 65 years of age or older. The average household size was 3.50 and the average family size was 3.59.

In the city, the population was spread out, with 35.5% under the age of 18, 8.1% from 18 to 24, 27.8% from 25 to 44, 27.8% from 45 to 64, and 0.7% who were 65 years of age or older. The median age was 35 years. For every 100 females, there were 105.3 males. For every 100 females age 18 and over, there were 109.5 males.

The median income for a household in the city was $67,813, and the median income for a family was $68,438. Males had a median income of $42,917 versus $20,938 for females. The per capita income for the city was $21,611. None of the families and 1.6% of the population were living below the poverty line.
