= Elliott, North Dakota =

Elliott
- City
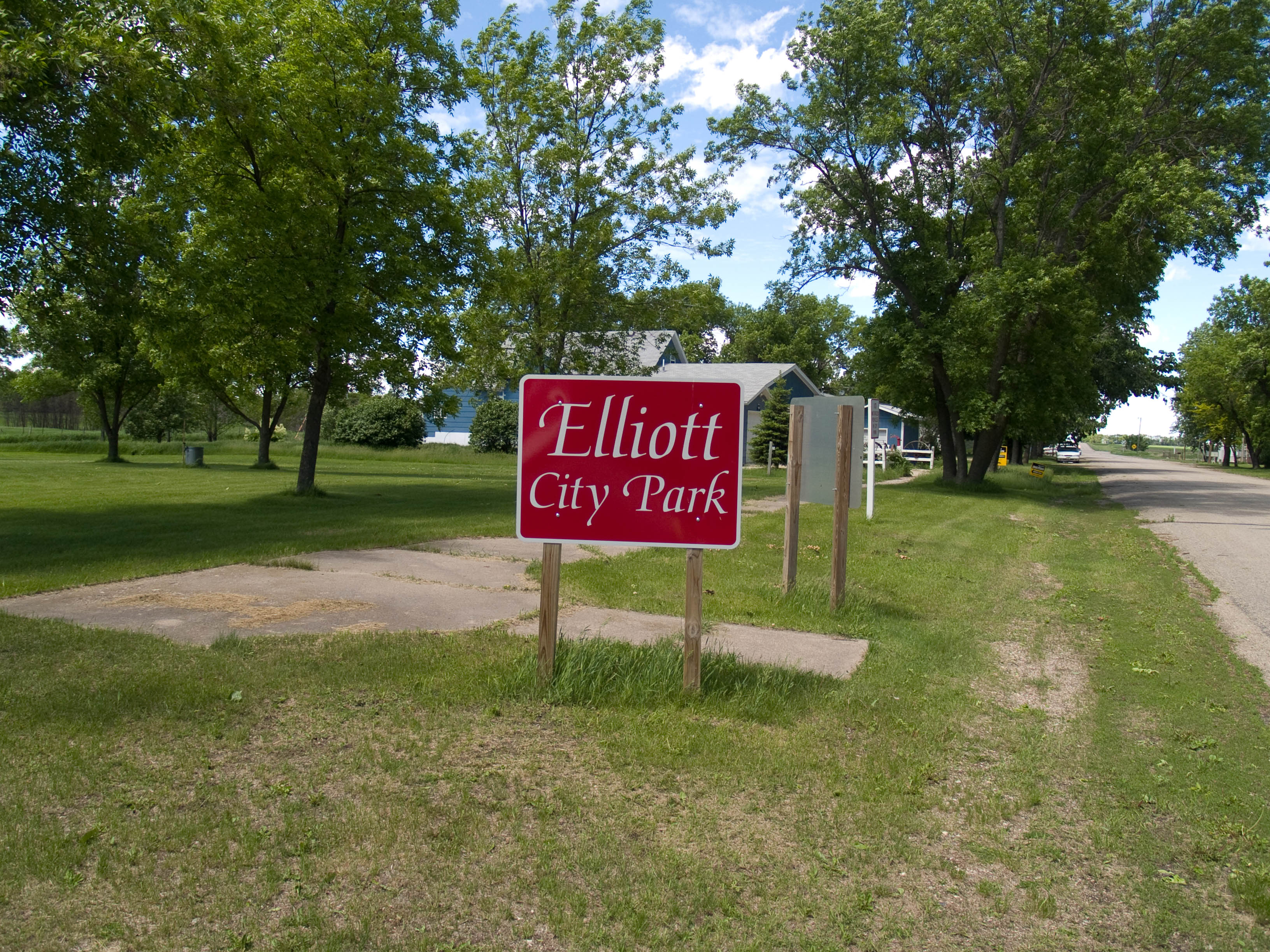
- Elliott City Park Sign

- Coordinates: 46°24′08″N 97°48′54″W
- Country: United States
- State: North Dakota
- County: Ransom
- Founded: 1883

Area
  - Total: 0.15 sq mi (0.40 km^{2})
  - Land: 0.15 sq mi (0.40 km^{2})
  - Water: 0 sq mi (0.00 km^{2})
- Elevation: 1,335 ft (407 m)

Population (2020)
  - Total: 24
  - Estimate (2022): 21
  - Density: 157.2/sq mi (60.68/km^{2})
- Time zone: UTC–6 (Central (CST))
  - Summer (DST): UTC–5 (CDT)
- ZIP Code: 58054
- Area code: 701
- FIPS code: 38-23340
- GNIS feature ID: 1036022

Elliott is a city in Ransom County, North Dakota, United States. The population was 24 at the 2020 census. Elliott was founded in 1883.

== Geography ==
According to the United States Census Bureau, the city has a total area of 0.15 square miles (0.39 km^{2}), all land.

== Demographics ==
Historical population
| Census | Pop. | Note | %± |
|---|---|---|---|
| 1930 | 106 | | — |
| 1940 | 118 | | 11.3% |
| 1950 | 87 | | −26.3% |
| 1960 | 62 | | −28.7% |
| 1970 | 50 | | −19.4% |
| 1980 | 44 | | −12.0% |
| 1990 | 32 | | −27.3% |
| 2000 | 44 | | 37.5% |
| 2010 | 25 | | −43.2% |
| 2020 | 24 | | −4.0% |
| 2022 (est.) | 21 | | −12.5% |
U.S. Decennial Census; 2020 Census

=== 2010 census ===
As of the census of 2010, there were 25 people, 12 households, and 7 families residing in the city. The population density was 166.7 inhabitants per square mile (64.4/km^{2}). There were 15 housing units at an average density of 100.0 per square mile (38.6/km^{2}). The racial makeup of the city was 92.0% White, 4.0% Asian, and 4.0% from two or more races.

There were 12 households, of which 16.7% had children under the age of 18 living with them, 58.3% were married couples living together, and 41.7% were non-families. 25.0% of all households were made up of individuals, and 8.3% had someone living alone who was 65 years of age or older. The average household size was 2.08 and the average family size was 2.43.

The median age in the city was 56.5 years. 8% of residents were under the age of 18; 4% were between the ages of 18 and 24; 24% were from 25 to 44; 44% were from 45 to 64; and 20% were 65 years of age or older. The gender makeup of the city was 44.0% male and 56.0% female.

=== 2000 census ===
As of the census of 2000, there were 44 people, 17 households, and 10 families residing in the city. The population density was 295.6 inhabitants per square mile (114.1/km^{2}). There were 18 housing units at an average density of 120.9 per square mile (46.7/km^{2}). The racial makeup of the city was 93.18% White, 2.27% Asian, and 4.55% from two or more races.

There were 17 households, out of which 29.4% had children under the age of 18 living with them, 64.7% were married couples living together, and 35.3% were non-families. 23.5% of all households were made up of individuals, and 5.9% had someone living alone who was 65 years of age or older. The average household size was 2.59 and the average family size was 3.18.

In the city, the population was spread out, with 22.7% under the age of 18, 15.9% from 18 to 24, 25.0% from 25 to 44, 27.3% from 45 to 64, and 9.1% who were 65 years of age or older. The median age was 35 years. For every 100 females, there were 100.0 males. For every 100 females age 18 and over, there were 126.7 males.

The median income for a household in the city was $40,625, and the median income for a family was $43,750. Males had a median income of $26,250 versus $0 for females. The per capita income for the city was $15,692. None of the population and none of the families were below the poverty line.
