= Briarwood, North Dakota =

- City
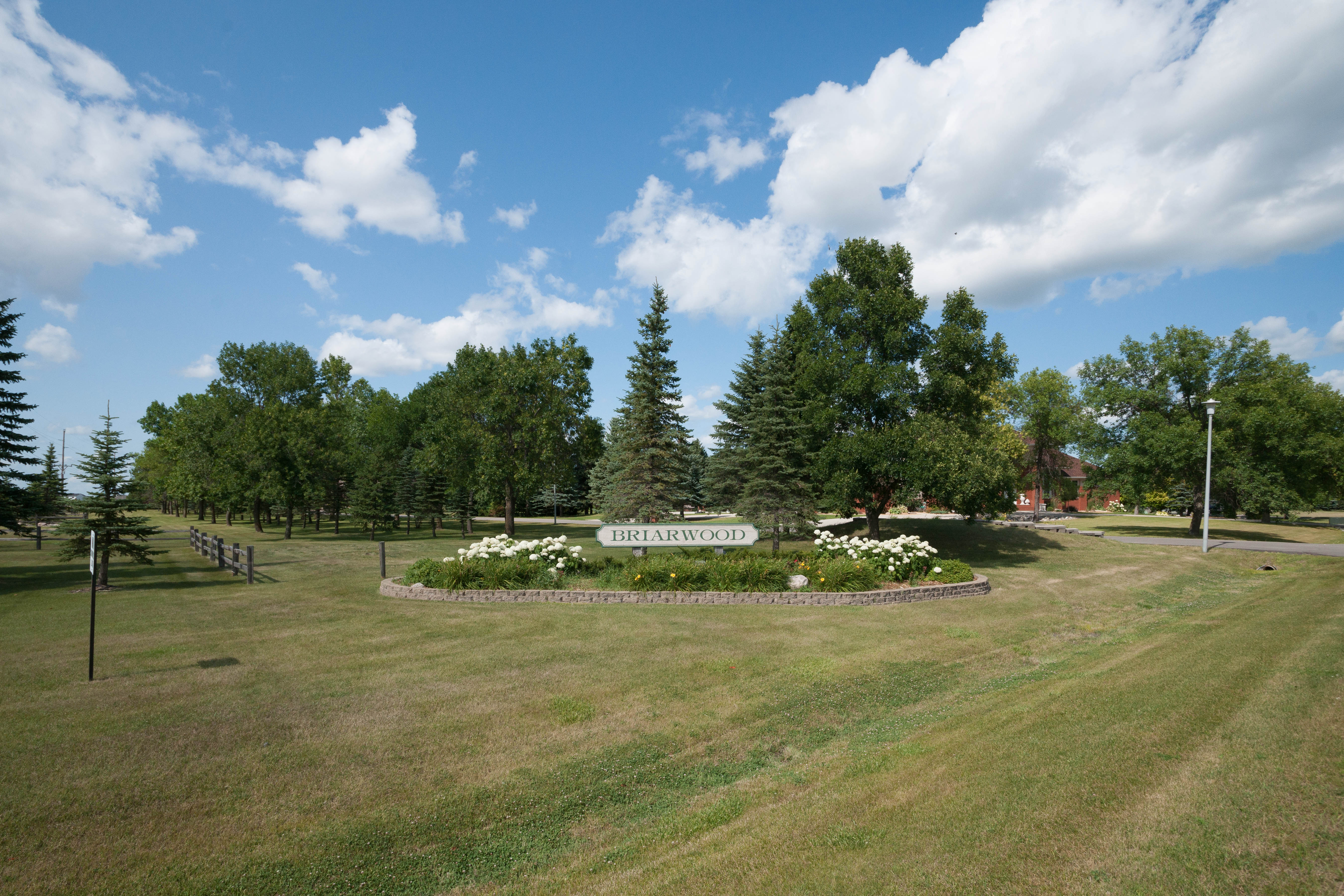
- Sign in Briarwood
- Interactive map of Briarwood, North Dakota
- Location within North Dakota
- Coordinates: 46.7870°N 96.7948°W
- Country: United States
- State: North Dakota
- County: Cass
- Founded: 1973

Government
  - Mayor: John Adams

Area
  - Total: 0.142 sq mi (0.369 km^{2})
  - Land: 0.142 sq mi (0.369 km^{2})
  - Water: 0 sq mi (0.000 km^{2}) 0.00%
- Elevation: 883 ft (269 m)

Population (2020)
  - Total: 57
  - Estimate (2025): 52
  - Density: 400/sq mi (150/km^{2})
- Time zone: UTC–6 (Central (CST))
  - Summer (DST): UTC–5 (CDT)
- ZIP Code: 58104
- Area code: 701
- FIPS code: 38-09320
- GNIS feature ID: 1035941

Briarwood is a city in Cass County, North Dakota, United States. The population was 57 as of the 2020 census, and was estimated at 52 in 2025. It is a suburb directly adjacent to the city of Fargo.

== History ==
Briarwood was founded in 1973.

== Geography ==
According to the United States Census Bureau, the city has a total area of 0.143 square miles (0.37 km^{2}), all land.

== Demographics ==
Historical population
Census	Pop.	Note	%±
1980	47		—
1990	88		87.2%
2000	78		−11.4%
2010	73		−6.4%
2020	57		−21.9%
2025 (est.)	52		−8.8%
U.S. Decennial Census; 2020 Census

=== 2020 census ===
As of the 2020 census, there were 57 people, 18 households, and 17 families residing in the city.

=== 2010 census ===
As of the 2010 census, there were 73 people, 25 households, and 21 families residing in the city. The population density was 486.7 inhabitants per square mile (187.9/km^{2}). There were 28 housing units at an average density of 186.7 per square mile (72.1/km^{2}). The racial makeup of the city was 95.9% White and 4.1% Asian.

There were 25 households, of which 44.0% had children under the age of 18 living with them, 80.0% were married couples living together, 4.0% had a female householder with no husband present, and 16.0% were non-families. 12.0% of all households were made up of individuals, and 4% had someone living alone who was 65 years of age or older. The average household size was 2.92 and the average family size was 3.24.

The median age in the city was 44.8 years. 31.5% of residents were under the age of 18; 1.3% were between the ages of 18 and 24; 17.8% were from 25 to 44; 39.7% were from 45 to 64; and 9.6% were 65 years of age or older. The gender makeup of the city was 54.8% male and 45.2% female.

=== 2000 census ===
As of the 2000 census, there were 78 people, 25 households, and 21 families residing in the city. The population density was 353.8 inhabitants per square mile (136.6/km^{2}). There were 26 housing units at an average density of 117.9 per square mile (45.5/km^{2}). The racial makeup of the city was 98.72% White, and 1.28% from two or more races. Hispanic or Latino people of any race were 3.85% of the population.

There were 25 households, out of which 56.0% had children under the age of 18 living with them, 76.0% were married couples living together, and 16.0% were non-families. 12.0% of all households were made up of individuals, and 4.0% had someone living alone who was 65 years of age or older. The average household size was 3.12 and the average family size was 3.48.

In the city, the population was spread out, with 38.5% under the age of 18, 1.3% from 18 to 24, 24.4% from 25 to 44, 29.5% from 45 to 64, and 6.4% who were 65 years of age or older. The median age was 38 years. For every 100 females, there were 116.7 males. For every 100 females age 18 and over, there were 128.6 males.

The median income for a household in the city was $180,508, and the median income for a family was $183,640. Males had a median income of $100,000 versus $76,250 for females. The per capita income for the city was $57,751. None of the population and none of the families were below the poverty line.
