= Benedict, North Dakota =

- City
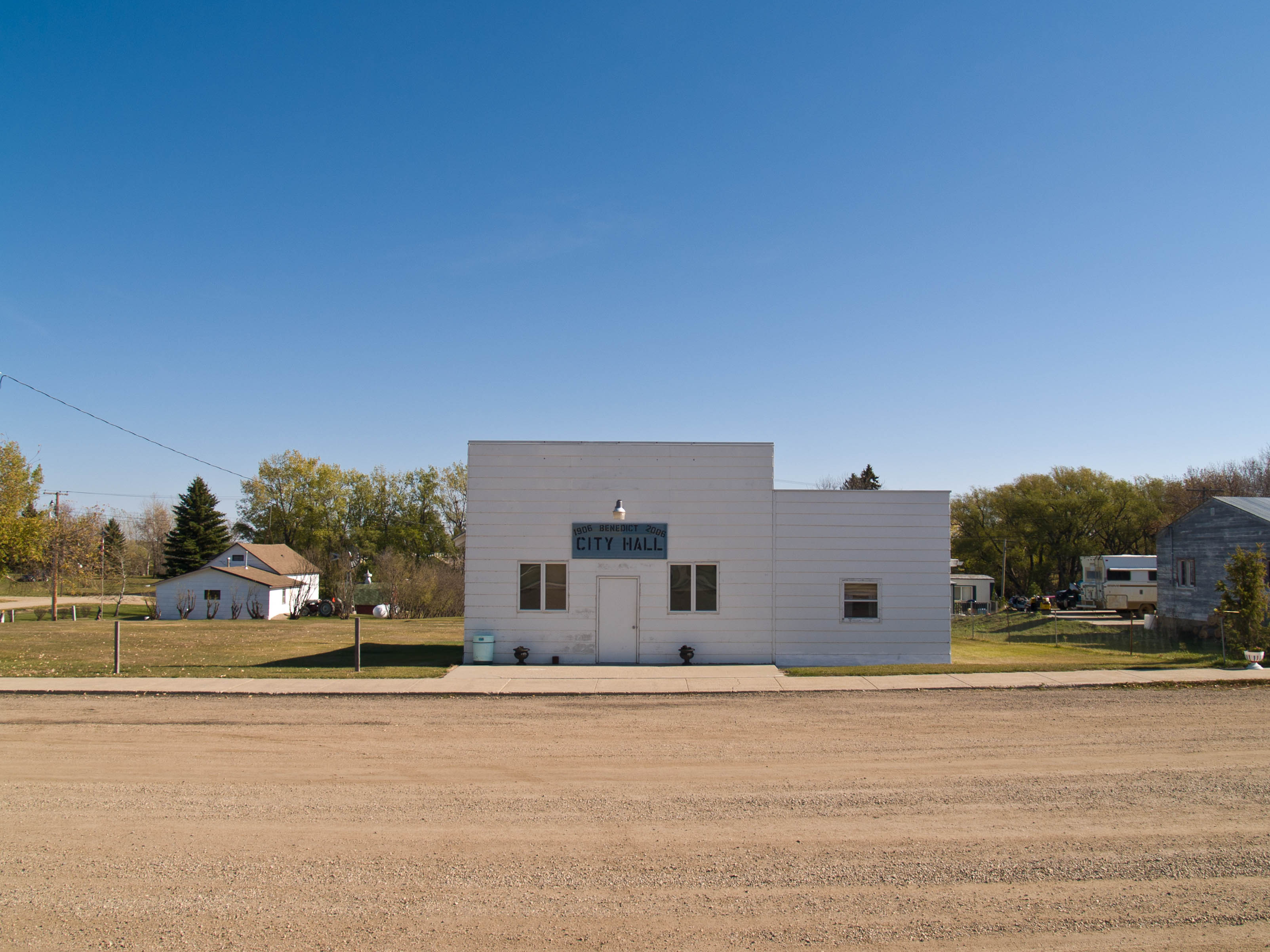
- Benedict City Hall

- Coordinates: 47°49′48″N 101°05′04″W
- Country: United States
- State: North Dakota
- County: McLean
- Founded: 1906

Area
  - Total: 0.25 sq mi (0.65 km^{2})
  - Land: 0.25 sq mi (0.65 km^{2})
  - Water: 0 sq mi (0.00 km^{2})
- Elevation: 2,103 ft (641 m)

Population (2020)
  - Total: 68
  - Estimate (2022): 66
  - Density: 272.1/sq mi (105.06/km^{2})
- Time zone: UTC-6 (Central (CST))
  - Summer (DST): UTC-5 (CDT)
- ZIP code: 58716
- Area code: 701
- FIPS code: 38-05980
- GNIS feature ID: 1035927

Benedict is a city in McLean County, North Dakota, United States. The population was 68 at the 2020 census. Benedict was founded in 1906.

== Geography ==
According to the United States Census Bureau, the city has a total area of 0.25 square miles (0.65 km^{2}), all land.

== Demographics ==
Historical population
Census	Pop.	Note	%±
1920	195		—
1930	145		−25.6%
1940	167		15.2%
1950	127		−24.0%
1960	129		1.6%
1970	72		−44.2%
1980	68		−5.6%
1990	52		−23.5%
2000	53		1.9%
2010	66		24.5%
2020	68		3.0%
2022 (est.)	66		−2.9%
U.S. Decennial Census; 2020 Census

=== 2010 census ===
As of the census of 2010, there were 66 people, 32 households, and 18 families residing in the city. The population density was 264.0 inhabitants per square mile (101.9/km^{2}). There were 35 housing units at an average density of 140.0 per square mile (54.1/km^{2}). The racial makeup of the city was 95.5% White, 1.5% African American, and 3.0% from two or more races. Hispanic or Latino of any race were 3.0% of the population.

There were 32 households, of which 25.0% had children under the age of 18 living with them, 43.8% were married couples living together, 6.3% had a female householder with no husband present, 6.3% had a male householder with no wife present, and 43.8% were non-families. 37.5% of all households were made up of individuals, and 15.6% had someone living alone who was 65 years of age or older. The average household size was 2.06 and the average family size was 2.67.

The median age in the city was 47 years. 21.2% of residents were under the age of 18; 6% were between the ages of 18 and 24; 18.1% were from 25 to 44; 30.3% were from 45 to 64; and 24.2% were 65 years of age or older. The gender makeup of the city was 40.9% male and 59.1% female.

=== 2000 census ===
As of the census of 2000, there were 53 people, 22 households, and 13 families residing in the city. The population density was 210.7 inhabitants per square mile (81.4/km^{2}). There were 27 housing units at an average density of 107.4 per square mile (41.5/km^{2}). The racial makeup of the city was 100% White.

There were 22 households, out of which 27.3% had children under the age of 18 living with them, 59.1% were married couples living together, 4.5% had a female householder with no husband present, and 36.4% were non-families. 27.3% of all households were made up of individuals, and 13.6% had someone living alone who was 65 years of age or older. The average household size was 2.41 and the average family size was 2.79.

In the city, the population was spread out, with 18.9% under the age of 18, 5.7% from 18 to 24, 22.6% from 25 to 44, 20.8% from 45 to 64, and 32.1% who were 65 years of age or older. The median age was 46 years. For every 100 females, there were 120.8 males. For every 100 females age 18 and over, there were 104.8 males.

The median income for a household in the city was $32,188, and the median income for a family was $10,625. Males had a median income of $36,250 versus $16,250 for females. The per capita income for the city was $22,303. There were 40.0% of families and 21.9% of the population living below the poverty line, including no under eighteens and 50.0% of those over 64.

== Education ==
It is within the Max Public School District 50.
