= Grano, North Dakota =

- City
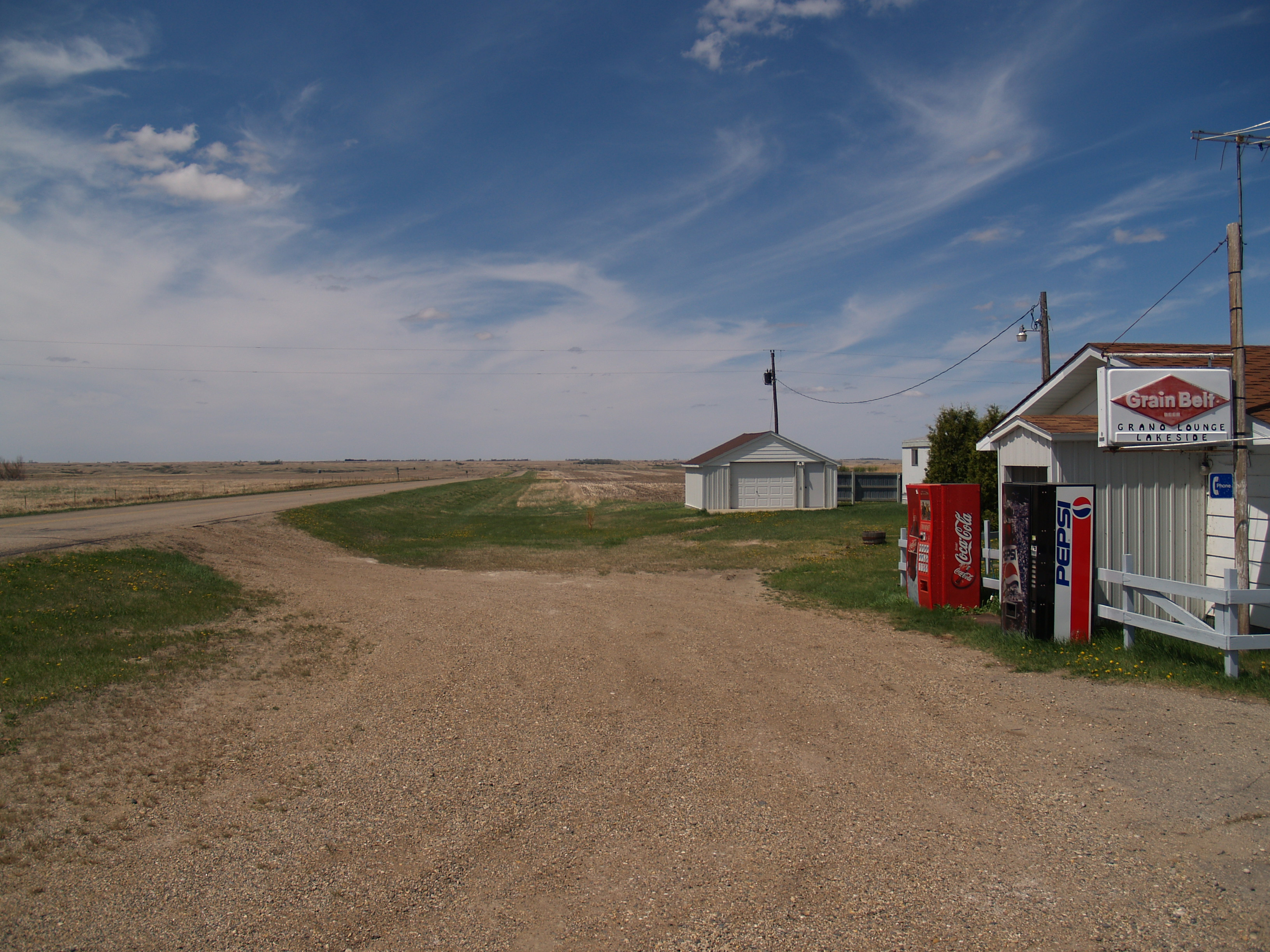
- Grano Lounge in Grano

- Location of Grano, North Dakota
- Coordinates: 48°36′55″N 101°35′21″W
- Country: United States
- State: North Dakota
- County: Renville
- Founded: 1905

Government
  - Mayor: James Gehringer

Area
  - Total: 0.294 sq mi (0.762 km^{2})
  - Land: 0.294 sq mi (0.762 km^{2})
  - Water: 0 sq mi (0.000 km^{2})
- Elevation: 1,729 ft (527 m)

Population (2020)
  - Total: 9
  - Estimate (2024): 10
  - Density: 31/sq mi (11.8/km^{2})
- Time zone: UTC–6 (Central (CST))
  - Summer (DST): UTC–5 (CDT)
- ZIP Code: 58750
- Area code: 701
- FIPS code: 38-32580
- GNIS feature ID: 1036066

Grano is a city in Renville County, North Dakota, United States. The population was 10 at the 2020 Census.

== History ==
Grano was founded in 1905 along the Soo Line Railroad branch line running east from Kenmare across the northern portion of North Dakota. Several unconfirmed explanations exist regarding how the town got its name. It is generally accepted that the town's name is derived from the Assiniboine, who lived in the area before the settlement of colonizers.

It is part of the Minot Micropolitan Statistical Area.

== Geography ==
According to the United States Census Bureau, the city has a total area of 0.294 square miles (0.76 km^{2}), all land.

== Demographics ==
Historical population
Census	Pop.	Note	%±
1910	325		—
1920	112		−65.5%
1930	90		−19.6%
1940	57		−36.7%
1950	27		−52.6%
1960	14		−48.1%
1970	4		−71.4%
1980	6		50.0%
1990	9		50.0%
2000	9		0.0%
2010	7		−22.2%
2020	9		28.6%
2024 (est.)	10		11.1%
U.S. Decennial Census; 2020 Census

=== 2010 census ===
As of the 2010 census, there were 7 people, 3 households, and 3 families residing in the city. The population density was 23.3 inhabitants per square mile (9.0/km^{2}). There were 3 housing units at an average density of 10.0 per square mile (3.9/km^{2}). The racial makeup of the city was 100.0% White.

There were 3 households, of which 100.0% were married couples living together. 0.0% of all households were made up of individuals. The average household size was 2.33 and the average family size was 2.33.

The median age in the city was 52.3 years. 0.0% of residents were under the age of 18; 0.0% were between the ages of 18 and 24; 14.3% were from 25 to 44; 85.7% were from 45 to 64; and 0.0% were 65 years of age or older. The gender makeup of the city was 57.1% male and 42.9% female.

=== 2000 census ===
As of the 2000 census, there were 9 people, 5 households, and 3 families residing in the city. The population density was 30.2 inhabitants per square mile (11.7/km^{2}). There were 5 housing units at an average density of 16.8 per square mile (6.4/km^{2}). The racial makeup of the city was 100.00% White.

There were 5 households, out of which three were married couples living together, and two were non-families. Two households were made up of individuals who were 65 years of age or older. The average household size was 1.80 and the average family size was 2.33.

In the city, the population was spread out, with 11.1% from 18 to 24, 44.4% from 25 to 44, and 44.4% of people aged 45 to 64. The median age was 44 years. For every five females there were four males. For every five females age 18 and over, there were four males.

The median income for a household in the city was $16,250, and the median income for a family was $0. Males had a median income of $0 versus $16,250 for females. The per capita income for the city was $15,000. None of the population and none of the families were below the poverty line.
