= North Dakota Highway 46 =

State highway in North Dakota, U.S.

North Dakota Highway 46
- ND 46 highlighted in red

Route information
- Maintained by NDDOT
- Length: 120.823 mi (194.446 km)
- Existed: 1939–present

Major junctions
- West end: ND 30 near Streeter
- US 281 south of Jamestown; ND 1 east of Litchville; ND 32 southeast of Nome; ND 18 near Leonard; I-29 / US 81 near Oxbow
- East end: CR 81 near Oxbow

Location
- Country: United States
- State: North Dakota
- Counties: Stutsman, Barnes, Cass

Highway system
- North Dakota State Highway System; Interstate; US; State
← ND 45	→ ND 48

North Dakota Highway 46 (ND 46) is a 121-mile-long (195 km) road in eastern North Dakota, crossing the Red River Valley between Streeter and Oxbow. It parallels and runs about 20 miles (32 km) south of Interstate 94 (I-94). I-29 borders it on the east and ND 30 borders it on the west.

== Route description ==
ND 46 runs in a nearly perfect straight line with minor deviations throughout the entire course, and on multiple county lines. About 10 miles in, ND 46 meets the northern terminus of ND 56 in Gackle, and then runs for almost 21 more miles to US 281 on the LaMoure/Stutsman county line. 29.7 miles to the east, it intersects ND 1 outside of Litchville, and meets ND 32 on the Ransom/Barnes county line. The two run concurrent for six miles before ND 32 turns south and ND 46 continues due east. 3 miles to the east, it passes the first road providing access to Enderlin, ultimately connecting with ND 18, 17.7 miles to the east. After the 4.9 mile concurrency, ND 18 continues alone to the east for about 15 miles before crossing over I-29 and US 81 at an interchange before ending at CR 81 a little over a mile short of the Red River of the North.

== Major intersections ==
County	Location	mi	km	Destinations	Notes
Logan–Stutsman county line		0.000	0.000	ND 30 – Streeter, Lehr, Napoleon	Western terminus
Logan–Stutsman county line	Gackle	9.806	15.781	ND 56 south – Fredonia	Northern terminus of ND 56
LaMoure–Stutsman county line		30.656	49.336	US 281 – Jamestown, Edgeley	
LaMoure–Barnes county line		60.486	97.343	ND 1 – I-94, Oakes, Verona	
Ransom–Barnes county line		73.444	118.197	ND 32 north – Nome	Western end of ND 32 overlap
Ransom–Barnes– Cass county tripoint		79.935	128.643	ND 32 south – Lisbon	Eastern end of ND 32 overlap
Richland–Cass county line	Leonard	100.766	162.167	ND 18 north – Leonard	Western end of ND 18 overlap
Richland–Cass county line		105.705	170.116	ND 18 south – Wyndmere	Eastern end of ND 18 overlap
Richland–Cass county line		120.318	193.633	I-29 / US 81 – Fargo, Sioux Falls	I-29 exit 48
Richland–Cass county line		120.823	194.446	CR 81 – Wahpeton	Eastern terminus
1.000 mi = 1.609 km; 1.000 km = 0.621 mi: Concurrency terminus
