= North Dakota Highway 13 =

State highway in North Dakota, US

North Dakota Highway 13
- ND 13 highlighted in red

Route information
- Maintained by NDDOT
- Length: 205.533 mi (330.773 km)

Major junctions
- West end: ND 1804 near Linton
- US 83 in Linton; ND 3 in Wishek; US 281 in Edgeley; ND 1 in Verona; ND 32 in Gwinner; ND 18 in Wyndmere; I-29 / US 81 in Mooreton; ND 210 in Wahpeton
- East end: CSAH 12 in Breckenridge, MN

Location
- Country: United States
- State: North Dakota
- Counties: Emmons, McIntosh, Logan, LaMoure, Dickey, Sargent, Richland

Highway system
- North Dakota State Highway System; Interstate; US; State
← US 12	→ ND 14

North Dakota Highway 13 (ND 13) is an approximately 205-mile-long (330 km) highway that serves southeast North Dakota. For the most part, the highway is a rural two-lane road, but for the final 12 miles (19 km) east of I-29 it is a four-lane divided road. Its eastern terminus is at the Minnesota state line over the Bois de Sioux River. The western terminus is located at ND 1804 about 13 miles (21 km) west of Linton and about 50 miles (80 km) south of Bismarck.

== Route description ==
North Dakota Highway 13 has its western terminus in Emmons County with ND 1804 and travels east about thirteen miles before entering Linton and beginning a concurrency with US 83. This concurrency is entirely within the Linton city limits, and after the highway leaves Linton, ND 13 travels east to the McIntosh county line. About five miles east of the county line, ND 13 starts a concurrency with ND 3. This concurrency travels about ten miles east to Wishek, where the highways part and ND 3 heads south. ND 13 then travels about eleven miles northeast to Lehr. In Lehr, the highway serves as the southern terminus of ND 30. A short distance northeast of Lehr, ND 13 travels along the McIntosh-Logan county line for about nine miles before curving northeast and into Logan County.

Northeast of here is the start of a concurrency with ND 56. The concurrency heads three miles east and enters LaMoure County. Still concurrent, ND 13 and ND 56 travel four miles east before ND 56 heads south to Kulm and ND 13 heads north and east to the city of Edgeley. In Edgeley, ND 13 intersects US 281. After this intersection, the highway heads eighteen miles due east to LaMoure. After traveling six miles east, the highway curves to the east-northeast for about five miles to parallel nearby railroad tracks. The highway reaches Verona and begins a concurrency with ND 1. The concurrency heads due south for six miles before heading west along the LaMoure-Dickey county line for about half of a mile. After this, the highways curve south once more and enter Dickey County. ND 13's concurrency with ND 1 continues southward for four miles, then ND 1 continues to head south toward Oakes, while ND 13 forks to the east and travels to Gwinner, entering Sargent County in the process. Just east of Gwinner, ND 13 is concurrent with ND 32 for a mile east. ND 13 travels eight miles east of this concurrency, then a mile north and about a mile and a half northeast to reach the southeast corner of Milnor. ND 13 then travels east to the Richland county line.

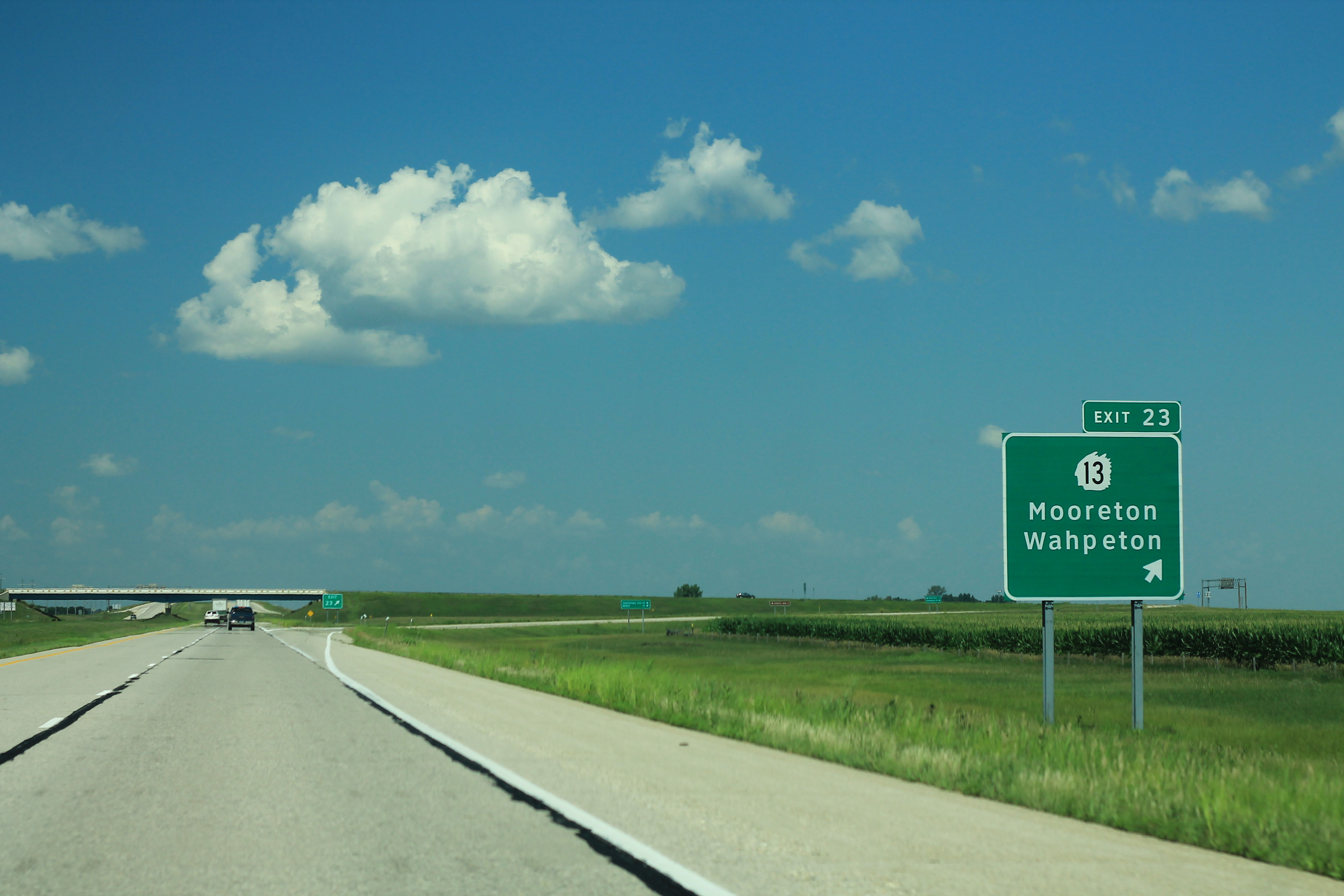
I-29 exit for ND 13

About six miles east of the county line, ND 13 intersects ND 18 in Wyndmere. A few miles east of Wyndmere is the small community of Barney. East of Barney is the city of Mooreton and east of Mooreton, ND 13 intersects Interstate 29 and US 81. From the I-29/US 81 interchange to its interchange with ND 210 in Wahpeton, a stretch of 12 miles (19 km), ND 13 is a divided four-lane highway. Through Wahpeton, the road is also known as Dakota Avenue. The highway's eastern terminus is over the Bois de Sioux River, on the state line with Minnesota.

== Major intersections ==
County	Location	mi	km	Destinations	Notes
Emmons		0.000	0.000	ND 1804 – Bismarck, Pollock SD	Western terminus
Emmons	Linton	12.902	20.764	US 83 north – Hazelton	Northern end of US 83 concurrency
Emmons	Linton	13.918	22.399	US 83 south – Strasburg, Herreid	Southern end of US 83 concurrency
McIntosh		36.540	58.805	ND 3 north – Napoleon	Western end of ND 3 concurrency
McIntosh	Wishek	46.428	74.719	ND 3 south – Ashley	Eastern end of ND 3 concurrency
McIntosh	Lehr	57.555	92.626	ND 30 north – Streeter	Southern terminus of ND 30
Logan		70.236	113.034	ND 56 north – Fredonia	Western end of ND 56 concurrency
LaMoure		77.250	124.322	ND 56 south – Kulm	Eastern end of ND 56 concurrency
LaMoure	Edgeley	92.037	148.119	US 281 – Jamestown, Ellendale	
LaMoure		122.109	196.515	ND 1 north – I-94/US 52	Northern end of ND 1 concurrency
Dickey		132.303	212.921	ND 1 south – Oakes	Southern end of ND 1 concurrency
Sargent	Gwinner	153.243	246.621	ND 32 north – Lisbon	Western end of ND 32 concurrency
Sargent	Gwinner	154.243	248.230	ND 32 south – Forman	Eastern end of ND 32 concurrency
Richland	Wyndmere	179.383	288.689	ND 18 – Wyndmere, Lidgerwood	
Richland		194.112	312.393	I-29 / US 81 – Fargo, Sioux Falls	I-29 Exit 23 northbound, 23A&B southbound
Richland		202.981	326.666	ND 13 Bus. east	Only signed eastbound
Richland	Wahpeton	204.048	328.383	ND 210 east to US 75	Interchange; exit not signed westbound
Richland	Wahpeton	204.738	329.494	ND 127 south (11th Street) – Fairmount	Serves Harry Stern Airport
Bois de Sioux River		205.533	330.773	North Dakota–Minnesota line	
Bois de Sioux River		205.533	330.773	CSAH 12 east (Minnesota Avenue) – Breckenridge	Continuation into Minnesota
1.000 mi = 1.609 km; 1.000 km = 0.621 mi: Concurrency terminus

== Gallery ==
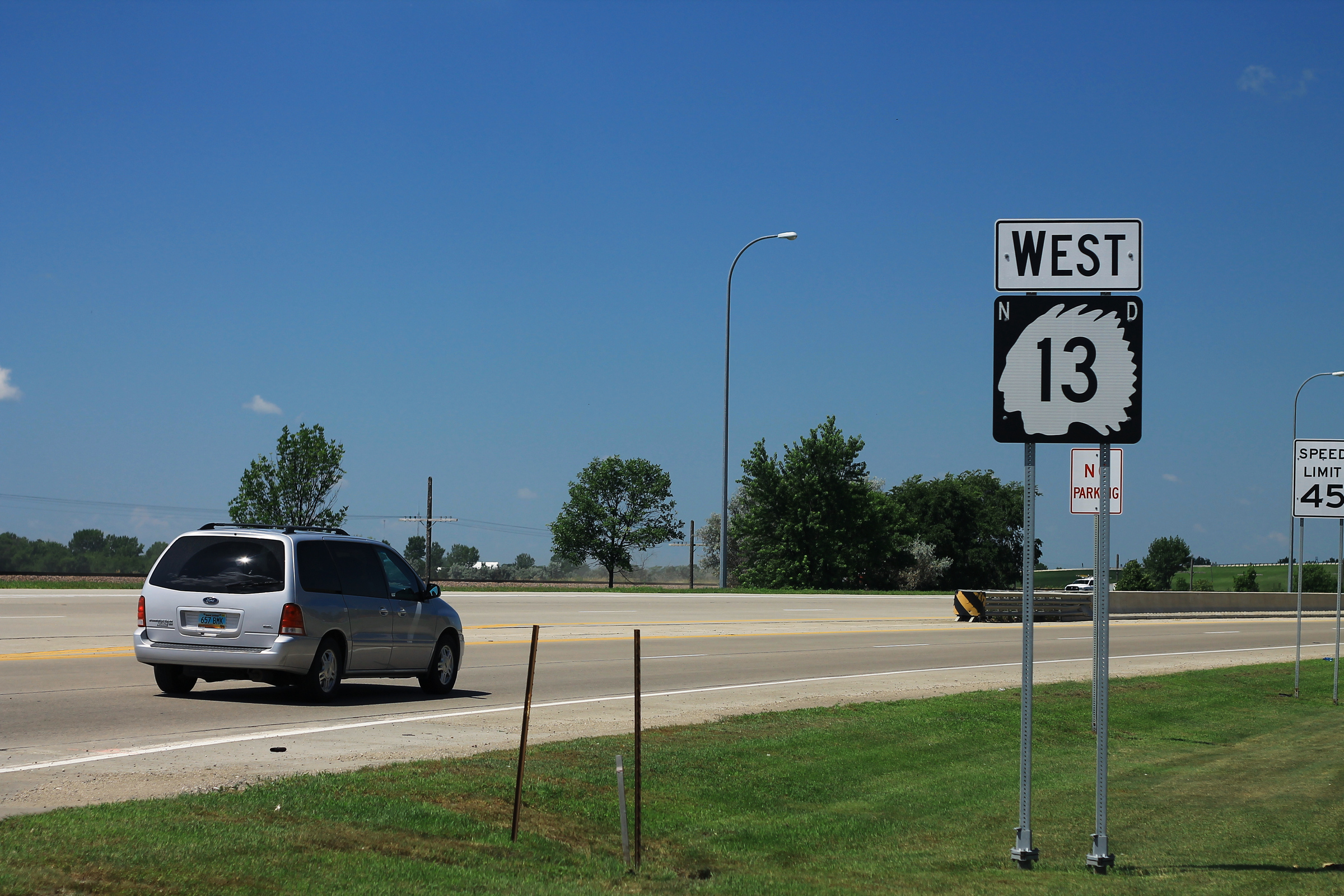
ND 13 westbound in Wahpeton
