= North Dakota Highway 30 =

State highway in North Dakota, U.S.

North Dakota Highway 30
- ND 30 highlighted in red

Route information
- Maintained by NDDOT
- Length: 131.427 mi (211.511 km)
- Existed: before 1940–present

Southern segment
- Length: 42.426 mi (68.278 km)
- South end: ND 13 in Lehr
- North end: I-94 near Medina

Central segment
- Length: 64.800 mi (104.285 km)
- South end: US 52 / ND 200 near Sykeston
- North end: US 2 near York

Northern segment
- Length: 24.201 mi (38.948 km)
- South end: ND 66 near Mylo
- Major intersections: US 281 / ND 5 in Rolla
- North end: PTH 18 at the Canadian border near St. John

Location
- Country: United States
- State: North Dakota
- Counties: Logan, Stutsman, Wells, Benson, Pierce, Rolette

Highway system
- North Dakota State Highway System; Interstate; US; State
| ← I-29 | → ND 31 |

North Dakota Highway 30 (ND 30) is a state highway in the U.S. state of North Dakota. The highway is currently broken up into three separate segments across the eastern half of North Dakota.

== Route description ==
=== Southern section ===
ND 30 begins at ND 13 in Lehr and runs north for 25.4 miles before turning left to remain north at ND 46's western terminus near Streeter. ND 30 remains heading due north until it breaks at I-94 near Medina. The road beyond the interchange leads to a county highway connecting I-94 to Medina.

=== Central section ===
The longest section of ND 30 starts at US 52 and ND 200 near Sykeston, and runs north for 13 miles until coming to a three way intersection with ND 15. ND 30 turns west for a 4.5 mile long concurrency before turning right to head back north again. For the next 30 miles, ND 30 connects Hamberg and Maddock with ND 19, and continues further north for 17.2 miles, breaking again at US 2 near York. Harlow is another community that ND 30 connects along the way.

=== Northern section ===
ND 30 resumes again, this time at ND 66 near Mylo, and runs north for 13.8 miles before intersecting US 281 and ND 5 in Rolla. North of Rolla, ND 30 ends at the Canadian border with no major intersections between the two, though it comes close to both Turtle Mountain State Forest, and the International Peace Garden, with a paved side road (106th Street NE) providing access.

== Major intersections ==
| County | Location | mi | km | Destinations | Notes |
|---|---|---|---|---|---|
| McIntosh | Lehr | 0.000 | 0.000 | ND 13 – Wishek, Kulm | Beginning of southern section |
| Logan | | 16.880 | 27.166 | ND 34 west – Napoleon | Southern end of ND 34 overlap |
| Logan | | 17.626 | 28.366 | ND 34 east | Northern end of ND 34 overlap |
| Logan–Stutsman county line | | 25.401 | 40.879 | ND 46 east – Gackle | |
| Stutsman | | 42.426 | 68.278 | I-94 – Fargo, Bismarck | End of southern section |
Gap in route
| Wells | Sykeston | 88.284 | 142.079 | US 52 / ND 200 – Carrington, McClusky | Beginning of central section |
| Wells | | 101.277 | 162.990 | ND 15 east – New Rockford | Southern end of ND 15 overlap |
| Wells | | 105.773 | 170.225 | ND 15 west – US 52, Fessenden | Northern end of ND 15 overlap |
| Benson | | 135.822 | 218.584 | ND 19 – Esmond, Minnewaukan | |
| Benson | York | 153.084 | 246.365 | US 2 – Leeds, Rugby, Devils Lake | End of central section |
Gap in route
| Rolette | | 181.274 | 291.732 | ND 66 – Rolette, Bisbee | Beginning of northern section |
| Rolette | Rolla | 195.080 | 313.951 | US 281 / ND 5 – Dunseith, Rocklake | |
| US–Canada border | | 205.475 | 330.680 | St. John Port of Entry; end of northern section | |
| Killarney-Turtle Mountain | | | | PTH 18 north – Killarney | Continuation into Manitoba |
1.000 mi = 1.609 km; 1.000 km = 0.621 mi: Concurrency terminus
