= White Rock Colony, South Dakota =

- Census-designated place
- Location within South Dakota Location within the United States
- Coordinates: 45°54′34″N 96°37′30″W
- Country: United States
- State: South Dakota
- County: Roberts

Area
  - Total: 0.58 sq mi (1.51 km^{2})
  - Land: 0.58 sq mi (1.49 km^{2})
  - Water: 0.0077 sq mi (0.02 km^{2})
- Elevation: 1,023 ft (312 m)

Population (2020)
  - Total: 0
  - Density: 0/sq mi (0/km^{2})
- Time zone: UTC-6 (Central (CST))
  - Summer (DST): UTC-5 (CDT)
- ZIP Code: 57260 (Rosholt)
- Area code: 605
- FIPS code: 46-71440
- GNIS feature ID: 2807117

White Rock Colony is a census-designated place (CDP) and Hutterite colony in Roberts County, South Dakota, United States, partly within the Lake Traverse Indian Reservation. It was first listed as a CDP prior to the 2020 census. The population of the CDP was 0 at the 2020 census.

It is in the northeast corner of the county (and the state of South Dakota), on high ground to the west of the valley of the Bois de Sioux River. South Dakota Highway 127 runs along the eastern edge of the CDP, leading south and west 8 miles (13 km) to Rosholt and north (as North Dakota Highway 127) 8 miles (13 km) to Fairmount, North Dakota. The town of White Rock (population 6 in 2020) is 3 miles (5 km) to the east.

== Demographics ==
Historical population
Census	Pop.	Note	%±
2020	0		—
U.S. Decennial Census
