= North Dakota Highway 127 =

State highway in North Dakota, U.S.

North Dakota Highway 127

Route information
- Maintained by NDDOT
- Length: 22.695 mi (36.524 km)
- Existed: c. 1979–present

Major junctions
- South end: SD 127 at the South Dakota border near White Rock, SD
- ND 11 in Fairmount
- North end: ND 13 in Wahpeton

Location
- Country: United States
- State: North Dakota
- Counties: Richland

Highway system
- North Dakota State Highway System; Interstate; US; State
← ND 97	→ ND 200

North Dakota Highway 127 (ND 127) is a 22.695-mile-long (36.524 km) north–south state highway in the U.S. state of North Dakota. ND 127's southern terminus is a continuation as South Dakota Highway 127 (SD 127) at the South Dakota/ North Dakota border, and the northern terminus is at ND 13 in Wahpeton.

== Major intersections ==
The entire route is in Richland County.

Location	mi	km	Destinations	Notes
	0.000	0.000	SD 127	Continues south as SD 127
Fairmount	7.984	12.849	ND 11 – Fairmount, I-29	
Wahpeton	22.695	36.524	ND 13 – Wyndmere, Fargo	Northern terminus
1.000 mi = 1.609 km; 1.000 km = 0.621 mi

== Gallery ==
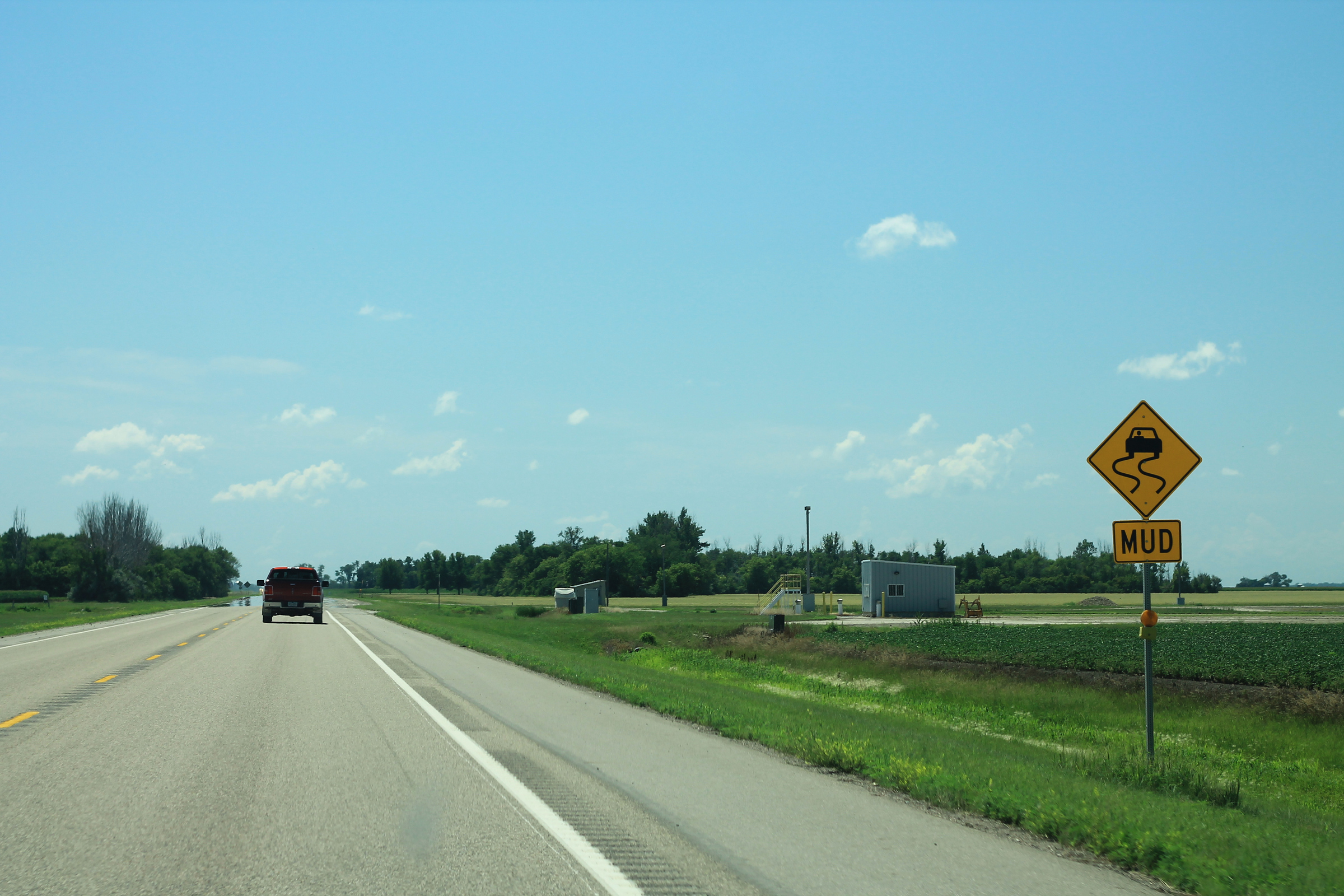

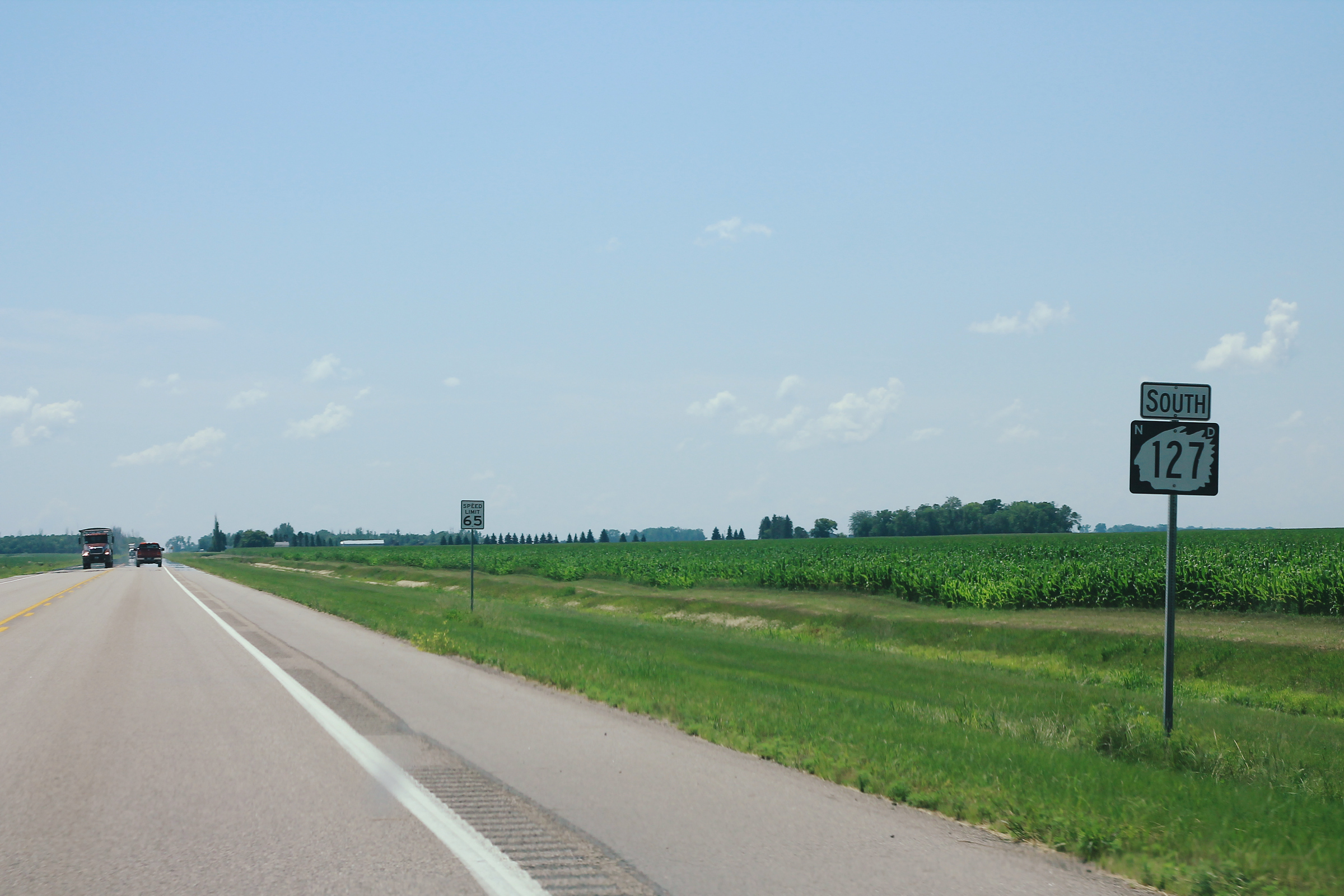
