= North Dakota Highway 56 =

State highway in North Dakota, U.S.

North Dakota Highway 56

Route information
- Maintained by NDDOT
- Length: 50.203 mi (80.794 km)
- Existed: 1937–present

Major junctions
- South end: ND 11 west of Ellendale
- ND 13 south of Fredonia
- North end: ND 46 in Gackle

Location
- Country: United States
- State: North Dakota
- Counties: Dickey, LaMoure, Logan

Highway system
- North Dakota State Highway System; Interstate; US; State
← ND 54	→ ND 57

North Dakota Highway 56 (ND 56) is a 50.203-mile-long (80.794 km) north–south state highway in the U.S. state of North Dakota. ND 56's southern terminus is at ND 11 west of Ellendale, and the northern terminus is at ND 46 in Gackle.

== Major intersections ==
County	Location	mi	km	Destinations	Notes
Dickey		0.000	0.000	ND 11	Southern terminus
LaMoure		20.274	32.628	ND 13 east	Southern end of ND 13 concurrency
Logan		27.288	43.916	ND 13 west	Northern end of ND 13 concurrency
Logan		43.209	69.538	ND 34 west	Eastern terminus of ND 34
Logan	Gackle	50.203	80.794	ND 46	Northern terminus
Concurrency terminus
