= North Dakota Highway 34 =

State highway in North Dakota, U.S.

North Dakota Highway 34
- ND 34 highlighted in red

Route information
- Maintained by NDDOT
- Length: 56.932 mi (91.623 km)
- Existed: 1931–present

Major junctions
- West end: US 83 in Hazelton
- ND 3 in Napoleon; ND 30 near Streeter
- East end: ND 56 near Gackle

Location
- Country: United States
- State: North Dakota
- Counties: Emmons, Logan

Highway system
- North Dakota State Highway System; Interstate; US; State
← ND 32	→ ND 35

North Dakota Highway 34 (ND 34) is a 56.932-mile-long (91.623 km) east–west state highway in the U.S. state of North Dakota. ND 34's western terminus is at U.S. Route 83 (US 83) in Hazelton, and the eastern terminus is at ND 56 near Gackle.

== Route description ==
Starting at US 83 on the northwest side of Hazelton, ND 34 skirts the north side of Hazelton while continuing east for 26 miles before intersecting ND 3 in Napoleon. 19.9 miles, ND 34 turns north onto ND 30 for a single mile concurrency before turning east and running for roughly 11 miles. ND 34 then ends at ND 56 south of Gackle.

== Major intersections ==
County	Location	mi	km	Destinations	Notes
Emmons	Hazelton	0.000	0.000	US 83	Western terminus of ND 34
Logan	Napoleon	26.073	41.960	ND 3	
Logan		45.208	72.755	ND 30 south	Western end of ND 30 overlap
Logan		45.954	73.956	ND 30 north	Eastern end of ND 30 overlap
Logan		56.932	91.623	ND 56 – Gackle	Eastern terminus of ND 34
1.000 mi = 1.609 km; 1.000 km = 0.621 mi: Concurrency terminus
