= South Dakota Highway 127 =

State highway in South Dakota, United States

Highway 127

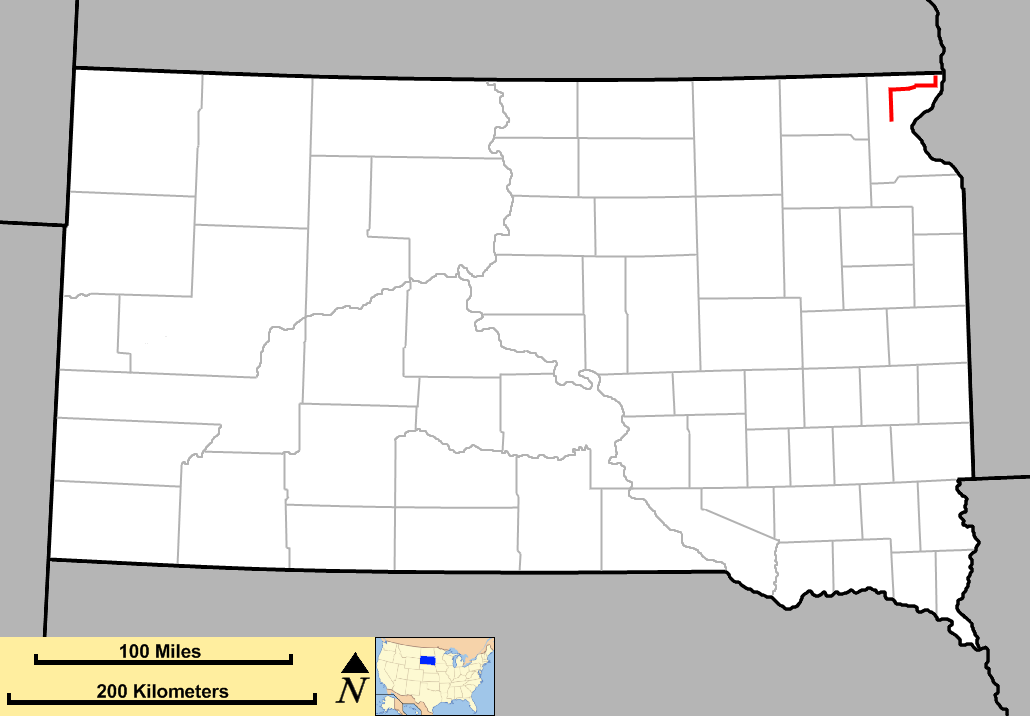
- Route of SD 127 (in red)

Route information
- Maintained by SDDOT
- Length: 37.328 mi (60.074 km)
- Existed: 1980–present

Major junctions
- South end: SD 10 in Sisseton
- I-29 / US 81 in Lien Township
- North end: ND 127 at the North Dakota state line near White Rock

Location
- Country: United States
- State: South Dakota
- Counties: Roberts

Highway system
- South Dakota State Trunk Highway System; Interstate; US; State
← SD 123	→ SD 130

South Dakota Highway 127 (SD 127) is a state highway that runs from North Dakota Highway 127 (ND 127) northwest of White Rock to SD 10 in Sisseton. It was commissioned around 1980.

== Route description ==
Starting in Sisseton, SD 127 runs north for 13 miles (21 km), then turns east at the eastern terminus of SD 106 where it runs east for 19.1 miles (30.7 km). Along the way, SD 127 passes south of New Effington, crosses under I-29, and skirts the south side of Rosholt. Turning to the north, SD 127 passes on the east side of White Rock Colony before entering North Dakota as ND 127.

== History ==
The route that is currently SD 127 was established in 1926 as part of US Highway 81 (US 81), the Meridian Highway. In 1980, construction of the segment of I-29 was completed north of exit 246, and US 81 was rerouted from this point northward into North Dakota. The old route from I-29 to the North Dakota state line near White Rock was designated as SD 127.

In 1984, when construction of I-29 between Peever and New Effington was completed, this segment of US 81 was also routed onto it, and SD 127 was extended along its former alignment, to SD 10 east of Sisseton.

== Major intersections ==
The entire route is in Roberts County.

Location	mi	km	Destinations	Notes
Sisseton	0.000	0.000	SD 10 – Browns Valley	
Minnesota Township	13.324	21.443	SD 106 – Claire City, Veblen	
Lien Township	20.560	33.088	I-29 / US 81 – Sisseton, Hankinson	
White Rock Township	37.328	60.074	ND 127 – Fairmount, Wahpeton	Continuation into North Dakota
1.000 mi = 1.609 km; 1.000 km = 0.621 mi
