= Dixon Township, Logan County, North Dakota =

Former township in North Dakota, United States

Dixon Township was a township in Logan County, North Dakota, United States. The former township government was disbanded in 2001, and the area was designated by the United States Census Bureau as Dixon Unorganized Territory. It later was merged into the West Logan Unorganized Territory.

As of the 2000 census the township's population was 17; it covered an area containing 35.764 square miles (92.63 km^{2}) of land and 0.102 square miles (0.26 km^{2}) of water, and it was located at 46.510035°N 99.601664°W. The elevation was 2,041 feet (622 m).

The township was located in the western part of the county and it bordered the following other townships within Logan County:

- Red Lake Township — south
- Starkey Township (defunct) — southwest corner
- Bryant Township (defunct) — west
- Glendale Township — northwest corner
