= Glendale Township =

Glendale Township may refer to:

- Glendale Township, Saline County, Kansas
- Glendale Township, Logan County, North Dakota
