= Robert Abell Round Barn =

- U.S. National Register of Historic Places
- Location within North Dakota Location within the United States
- Nearest city: Burnstad, North Dakota
- Coordinates: 46°22′35″N 99°28′29″W
- Area: less than one acre
- Built: 1942
- Built by: Robert Abell
- Architectural style: Round barn
- MPS: North Dakota Round Barns TR
- NRHP reference No.: 86002754
- Added to NRHP: October 7, 1986

The Robert Abell Round Barn, in Logan County near Burnstad, North Dakota, United States, was built in 1942 by Robert Abell. It was listed on the National Register of Historic Places in 1986.

It cost $800.
