= Haag Township, Logan County, North Dakota =

Township in Logan County, North Dakota

Coordinates: 46°19′30″N 99°05′11″W

Haag Township is one of the nine townships of Logan County, North Dakota, United States. It lies in the southeastern corner of the county, surrounding the city of Fredonia, and it borders the following other township within Logan County:

- Janke Township – north
