= Finn Township, Logan County, North Dakota =

Coordinates: 46°35′30″N 99°05′31″W

Finn Township
- Township
- Location within North Dakota
- Country: United States
- State: North Dakota
- County: Logan

Finn Township is one of the nine townships of Logan County, North Dakota, United States. It lies in the northeastern corner of the county, surrounding the city of Gackle, and it borders the following other township within Logan County:

- Gutschmidt Township — south
