= Bryant Township, Logan County, North Dakota =

Former township in North Dakota, United States

Bryant Township was a township in Logan County, North Dakota, United States. The former township was merged into the West Logan Unorganized Territory.

As of the 2000 census the township's population was 78, it covered an area containing 34.436 square miles (89.19 km^{2}) of land and 0.014 square miles (0.036 km^{2}) of water, and it was located at 46.496600°N 99.735648°W. Its elevation was 2,021 feet (616 m).

The township was located in the western part of the county, surrounding the city of Napoleon, and it bordered the following other townships within Logan County:

- Glendale Township — north
- Dixon Unorganized Territory (defunct, formerly Dixon Township) — east
- Red Lake Township — southeast corner
- Starkey Township (defunct) — south
- Sealy Township — northwest corner
