= Hans Langseth =

Holder of record for longest beard (1846–1927)

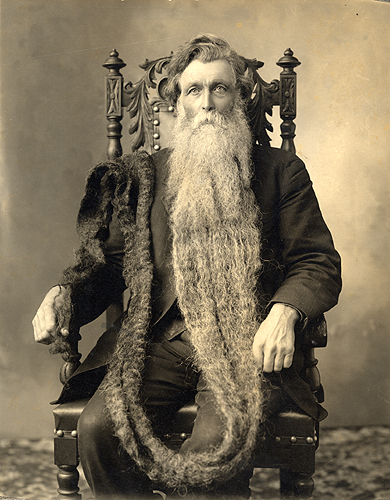
- Hans Langseth c. 1912
- Born: Hans Nilson Langseth; July 14, 1846; Eidsvoll, Akershus, Union of Sweden and Norway
- Died: November 10, 1927 (aged 81); Wyndmere, North Dakota, United States
- Burial place: Elk Creek Church Cemetery
- Occupation: Farmer
- Known for: Longest beard
- Spouse: Anna Berntsen

Hans Nilson Langseth (July 14, 1846 – November 10, 1927) was a Norwegian-American who held the record for the world's longest beard.

== Biography ==
Langseth was born in Eidsvoll, Norway, on July 14, 1846, and immigrated to the United States in 1867. He married Anna Berntsen in 1870 and worked as a farmer in Elkton Township, Minnesota. At the age of 19 years old, he began to grow a beard, and never shaved again until his death. In his later life, he traveled around the United States as part of a freak show showing off his beard.

Langseth died of complications of old age at age 81 in Wyndmere, North Dakota, on November 10, 1927, and is buried in Elk Creek Church Cemetery in Kensett, Iowa. When he died, his beard measured 5.33 meters (17.5 ft). It was donated to the Department of Anthropology at the Smithsonian Institution in 1967.

== See also ==
- Hans Staininger
