= Gutschmidt Township, Logan County, North Dakota =

Coordinates: 46°29′00″N 99°05′01″W

Gutschmidt Township
- Township
- Location in North Dakota

Gutschmidt Township is one of the nine townships of Logan County, North Dakota, United States. It lies in the eastern part of the county and borders the following other townships within Logan County:

- Finn Township — north
- Janke Township — south
