= Starkey Township, Logan County, North Dakota =

Former township in North Dakota, United States

Starkey Township
- Former township
- Location in North Dakota
- Coordinates: 46°24′50″N 99°42′31″W
- Country: United States
- State: North Dakota
- County: Logan

Area
  - Land: 36.105 sq mi (93.51 km^{2})
- Elevation: 2,119 ft (646 m)

Population (2000)
  - Total: 44
  - Density: 1.2/sq mi (0.47/km^{2})
- Time zone: UTC-6:00 (CST)
  - Summer (DST): UTC-5:00 (CDT)

Starkey Township was a township in Logan County, North Dakota, United States. The former township was merged into the West Logan Unorganized Territory.

As of the 2000 census the township's population was 44; it covered an area containing 36.105 square miles (93.51 km^{2}), all land, and it was located at 46.414434°N 99.738411°W. The elevation was 2,119 feet (646 m).

The township was located in the western part of the county and it bordered the following other townships within Logan County:

- Bryant Township (defunct) — north
- Dixon Unorganized Territory (defunct, formerly Dixon Township) — northeast corner
- Red Lake Township — east
