= Sealy Township, Logan County, North Dakota =

Coordinates: 46°35′00″N 99°50′01″W

Sealy Township is one of the nine townships of Logan County, North Dakota, United States. It lies in the northwestern corner of the county and borders the following other townships within Logan County:

- Glendale Township — east
- Bryant Township — southeast corner
