= Janke Township, Logan County, North Dakota =

Township in Logan County, North Dakota

Coordinates: 46°24′00″N 99°05′01″W

Janke Township is one of the nine townships of Logan County, North Dakota, United States. It lies in the eastern part of the county and borders the following other townships within Logan County:

- Gutschmidt Township — north
- Haag Township — south
