= Amy Olson =

American professional golfer (born 1992)

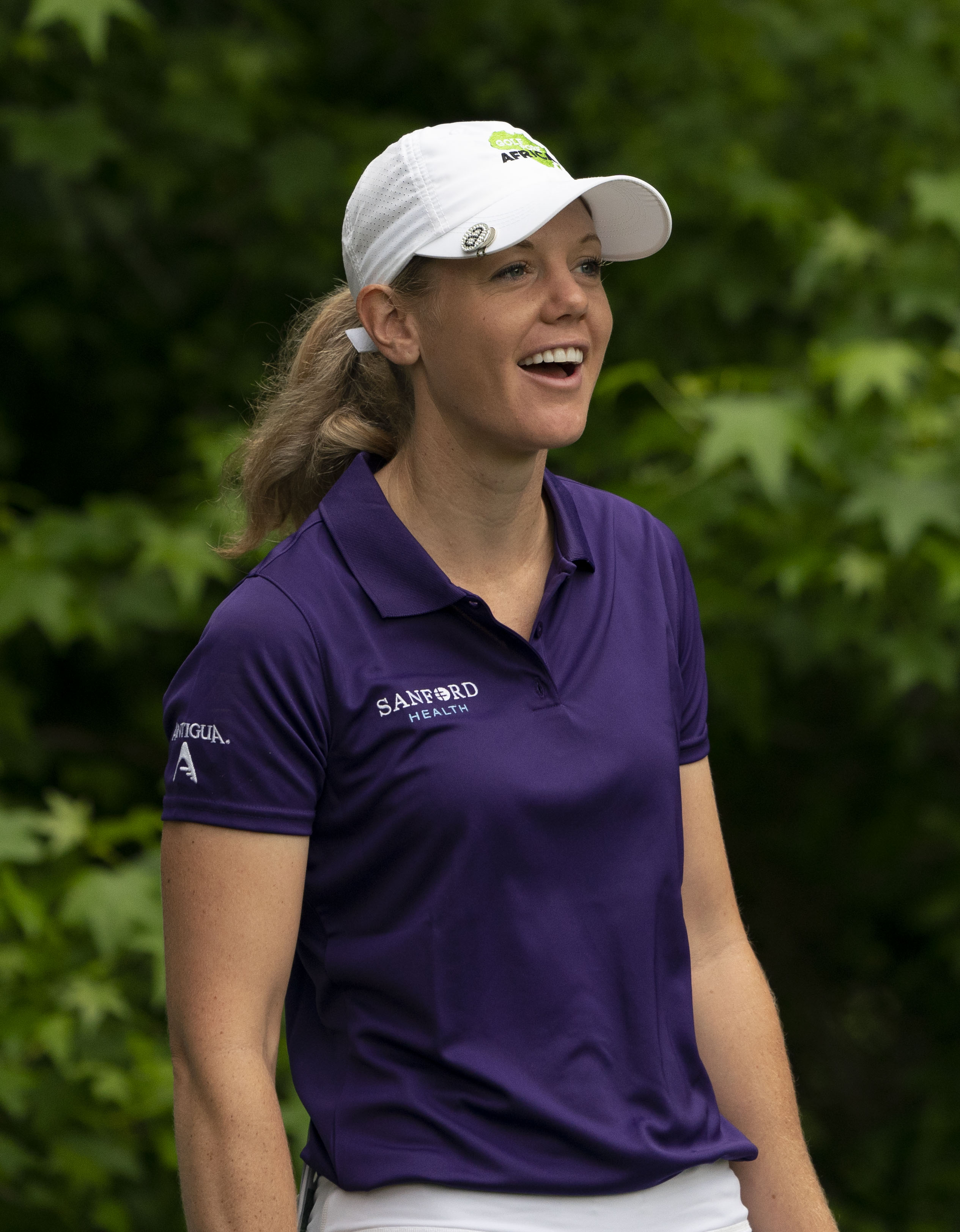
- Olson in 2018

Personal information
- Nationality: United States
- Born: July 10, 1992 (age 34) Oxbow, North Dakota
- Height: 5 ft 9 in (1.75 m)
- Spouse: Grant Olson
- Children: 1

Career
- Sport: Golf
- College: North Dakota State University
- Turned professional: 2013
- Former tour: LPGA Tour (joined 2013)

Number of wins by tour
- LPGA Tour: 0

Best results in LPGA major championships
- Chevron Championship: T9: 2018
- Women's PGA C'ship: T18: 2018
- U.S. Women's Open: T2: 2020
- Women's British Open: T28: 2018
- Evian Championship: T2: 2018

Amy Olson née Anderson (born July 10, 1992) is an American professional golfer. She played on the LPGA Tour from 2013 to 2023. She turned professional in 2013 after her collegiate career at North Dakota State University where she won an NCAA record 20 collegiate events.

== Early life ==
Anderson was born in 1992 in Oxbow, North Dakota to Mark and Twyla Anderson. She started playing golf at age two and won numerous local, state, and regional competitions. her most notable win coming in 2009 at the U.S. Girl's Junior at Trump National Golf Club Bedminster. In 2011, she was the first woman to compete in the KX Bank of the West Amateur Tournament.

She has one sibling, Nathan Anderson, who competed on North Dakota State University's men's golf team. She was home schooled through high school.

== Amateur career ==
Anderson competed at North Dakota State University (NDSU) where she led the women's golf program in scoring each of her four years. She qualified for the 2011 U.S. Women's Open while in college and held the first-round lead at The Broadmoor. She won 20 collegiate events, which beat Juli Inkster's NCAA record of 17 events.

In addition to her performance on the golf course, Anderson held a 3.97 GPA in accounting and won the Elite 89 Award as a sophomore, being the student-athlete with the highest GPA (4.0) at the national championship.

== Professional career ==
After completing her senior season at NDSU, Anderson turned professional and won Stage II of LPGA Qualifying school. She gained her LPGA Tour card in June 2013 to be part of the rookie class in 2014. Her best finish of the year came at the LPGA Lotte Championship in Hawaii, where she finished tied for 7th.

In 2018, Olson made the final pairing at the ANA Inspiration, and picked up her first top-10 in a major there as she tied for 9th. At The Evian Championship, Olson came close to making her first LPGA victory a major championship, but after at least sharing the lead for most of the final day, she lost to Angela Stanford on the 18th hole with a double bogey. By the end of 2018, she posted a career-best four top-10 finishes in 24 starts, and passed the $1 million mark in career earnings with her T10 finish at the CME Group Tour Championship.

Olson started her 2019 season sharing a five-way tie for tenth in the ISPS Handa Women's Australian Open, and a tie for fifth in the HSBC Women's World Championship.

Olson announced her professional golf retirement on her X account on April 24, 2024.

== Personal life ==
As of 2017 she competes under her married name, Amy Olson. Olson is married to Grant Olson, the NDSU defensive coordinator.

She found out on January 13, 2023, she is expecting their first child. She played the 2023 U.S. Women's Open at Pebble Beach Golf Links on July 6–9 while seven months pregnant, before a planned maternity leave at 30 weeks. That would be her last tournament before officially retiring in 2024. She gave birth to her daughter in 2023.

She is a Christian.

== Results in LPGA majors ==
Results not in chronological order before 2019.

Tournament	2011	2012	2013	2014	2015	2016	2017	2018	2019	2020	2021	2022	2023
Chevron Championship					T67			T9	T52	T51	T40	CUT	
Women's PGA Championship				CUT	70	CUT	CUT	T18	CUT	T37	CUT	CUT	
U.S. Women's Open	63					T52			CUT	T2	T12	T60	CUT
The Evian Championship ^				CUT	63		T70	T2	T30	NT	T60	CUT	
Women's British Open				CUT				T28	CUT	T45	CUT	CUT	

^ The Evian Championship was added as a major in 2013.

Top 10
Did not play

LA = low amateur
CUT = missed the half-way cut
NT = no tournament
"T" = tied

=== Summary ===
Tournament	Wins	2nd	3rd	Top-5	Top-10	Top-25	Events	Cuts made
Chevron Championship	0	0	0	0	1	1	6	5
Women's PGA Championship	0	0	0	0	0	1	9	3
U.S. Women's Open	0	1	0	1	1	2	7	5
The Evian Championship	0	1	0	1	1	1	7	5
Women's British Open	0	0	0	0	0	0	6	2
Totals	0	2	0	2	3	5	35	20

- Most consecutive cuts made – 6 (2017 Evian – 2019 ANA)
- Longest streak of top-10s – 1 (three times)

== Team appearances ==
Amateur

- Curtis Cup (representing the United States): 2012
