= Burnstad, North Dakota =

Unincorporated community in North Dakota, US

Burnstad Burnstadt
- Hamlet
- Location within North Dakota Location within the United States
- Coordinates (Red Lake Township): 46.38°N 99.63°E
- Country: United States
- State: North Dakota
- County: Logan
- Named for: C.P. Burnstad
- Postal code: 58495
- Area code: 701

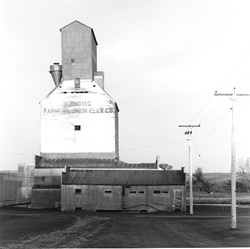
Grain elevator in Burnstad in the late 1950s

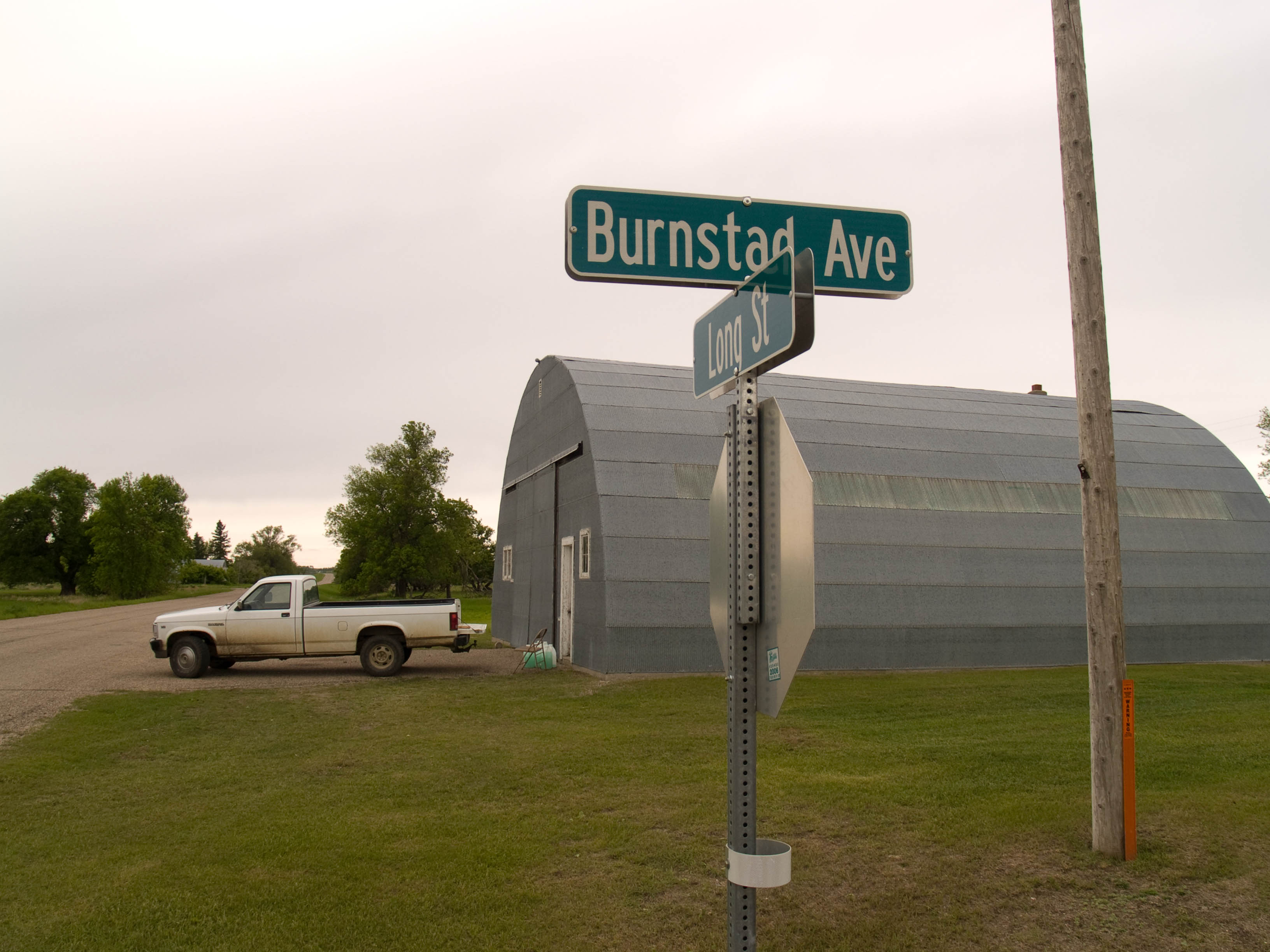
Burnstad in 2008

Burnstad is an unincorporated community in Logan County, North Dakota, United States.

== History ==
A post office was established at Burnstad in 1907, and remained in operation until 1979. The community was named for C. P. Burnstad, a cattleman. Little remains of the original community. The population was estimated at 200 in 1940.

Burnstad is the nearest populated place to the Robert Abell Round Barn, which is listed on the National Register of Historic Places.
