= Oxbow, North Dakota =

- City
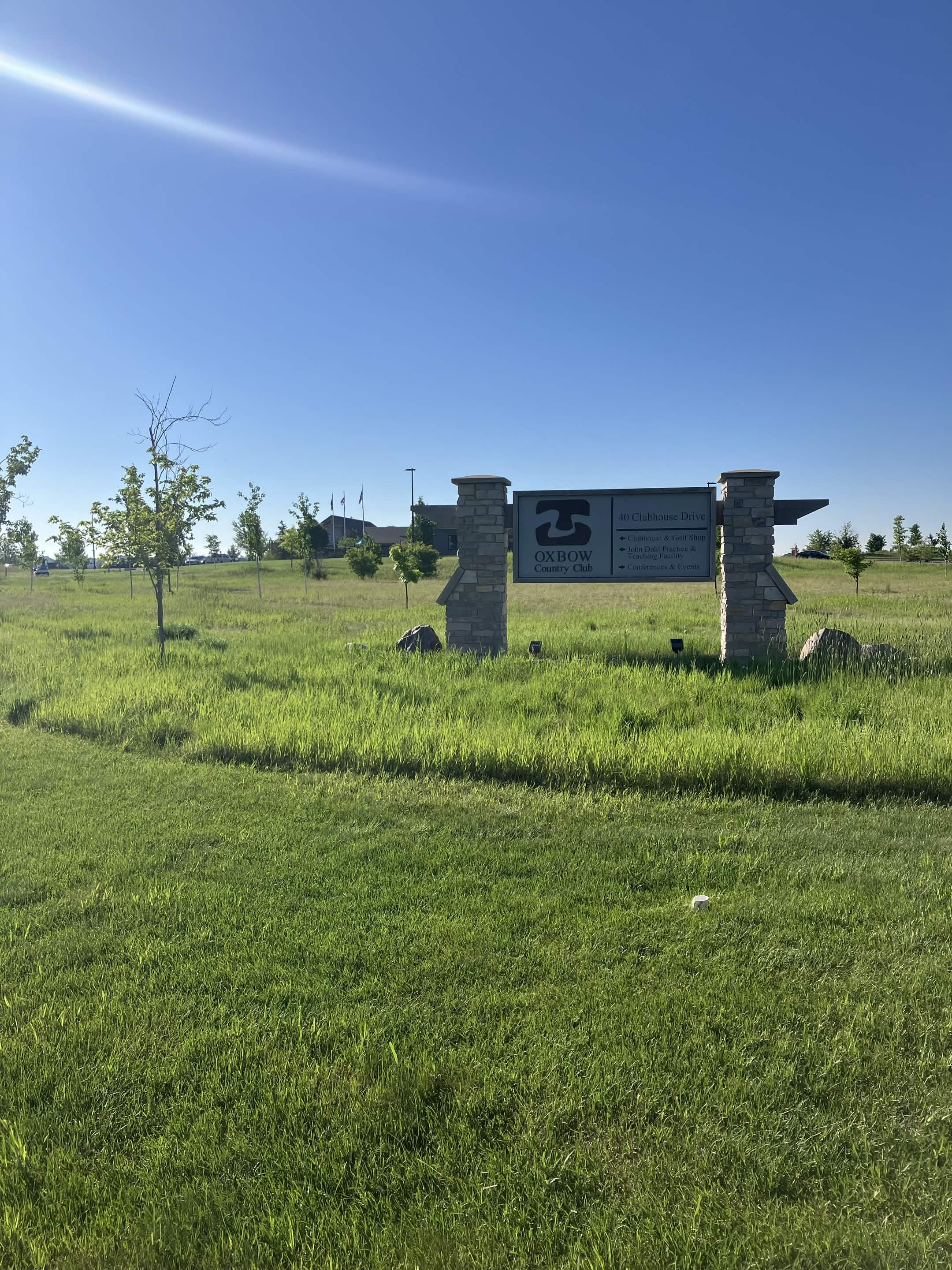
- Oxbow Country Club

- Location of Oxbow, North Dakota
- Coordinates: 46°39′46″N 96°48′39″W
- Country: United States
- State: North Dakota
- County: Cass
- Founded: October 25, 1988

Government
  - Mayor: Jim Nyhof

Area
  - Total: 1.53 sq mi (3.97 km^{2})
  - Land: 1.53 sq mi (3.97 km^{2})
  - Water: 0 sq mi (0.00 km^{2})
- Elevation: 915 ft (279 m)

Population (2020)
  - Total: 381
  - Estimate (2023): 371
  - Density: 250/sq mi (96/km^{2})
- Time zone: UTC-6 (Central (CST))
  - Summer (DST): UTC-5 (CDT)
- ZIP code: 58047
- Area code: 701
- FIPS code: 38-60480
- GNIS feature ID: 1033709
- Website: oxbownd.com

Oxbow is a city in Cass County, North Dakota, United States. The population was 381 at the 2020 census. It is an upscale bedroom community located 15 miles (24 km) south of Fargo. It was incorporated as a city October 25, 1988.

== Geography ==
According to the United States Census Bureau, the city has a total area of 0.42 square miles (1.09 km^{2}), all land.

== Demographics ==
Historical population
Census	Pop.	Note	%±
1990	100		—
2000	248		148.0%
2010	305		23.0%
2020	381		24.9%
2022 (est.)	373		−2.1%
U.S. Decennial Census; 2020 Census

=== 2010 census ===
As of the census of 2010, there were 305 people, 101 households, and 92 families living in the city. The population density was 726.2 inhabitants per square mile (280.4/km^{2}). There were 108 housing units at an average density of 257.1 per square mile (99.3/km^{2}). The racial makeup of the city was 100.0% White. Hispanic or Latino of any race were 2.6% of the population.

There were 101 households, of which 50.5% had children under the age of 18 living with them, 86.1% were married couples living together, 3.0% had a female householder with no husband present, 2.0% had a male householder with no wife present, and 8.9% were non-families. 4.0% of all households were made up of individuals. The average household size was 3.02 and the average family size was 3.13.

The median age in the city was 39.4 years. 32.1% of residents were under the age of 18; 3.1% were between the ages of 18 and 24; 23.9% were from 25 to 44; 35.4% were from 45 to 64; and 5.6% were 65 years of age or older. The gender makeup of the city was 51.1% male and 48.9% female.

=== 2000 census ===
As of the census of 2000, there were 248 people, 83 households, and 76 families living in the city. The population density was 609.5 inhabitants per square mile (235.3/km^{2}). There were 84 housing units at an average density of 206.5 per square mile (79.7/km^{2}). The racial makeup of the city was 99.60% White, and 0.40% from two or more races.

There were 83 households, out of which 51.8% had children under the age of 18 living with them, 89.2% were married couples living together, and 8.4% were non-families. 6.0% of all households were made up of individuals, and 2.4% had someone living alone who was 65 years of age or older. The average household size was 2.99 and the average family size was 3.11.

In the city, the population was spread out, with 31.5% under the age of 18, 4.0% from 18 to 24, 34.7% from 25 to 44, 24.6% from 45 to 64, and 5.2% who were 65 years of age or older. The median age was 38 years. For every 100 females, there were 106.7 males. For every 100 females age 18 and over, there were 112.5 males.

The median income for a household in the city was $88,700, and the median income for a family was $92,211. Males had a median income of $61,667 versus $29,583 for females. The per capita income for the city was $35,207. About 1.3% of families and 2.8% of the population were below the poverty line, including none of those under the age of eighteen and 30.0% of those 65 or over.

== Notable person ==
- Amy Anderson, professional golfer
