= Red Lake Township, Logan County, North Dakota =

Township in Logan County, North Dakota

Coordinates: 46°25′00″N 99°35′01″W

Red Lake Township is one of the nine townships of Logan County, North Dakota, United States. It lies in the western part of the county and borders the following other townships within Logan County:

- Dixon Unorganized Territory — north
- Starkey Township — west
- Bryant Township — northwest corner
