= Nome, North Dakota =

- City
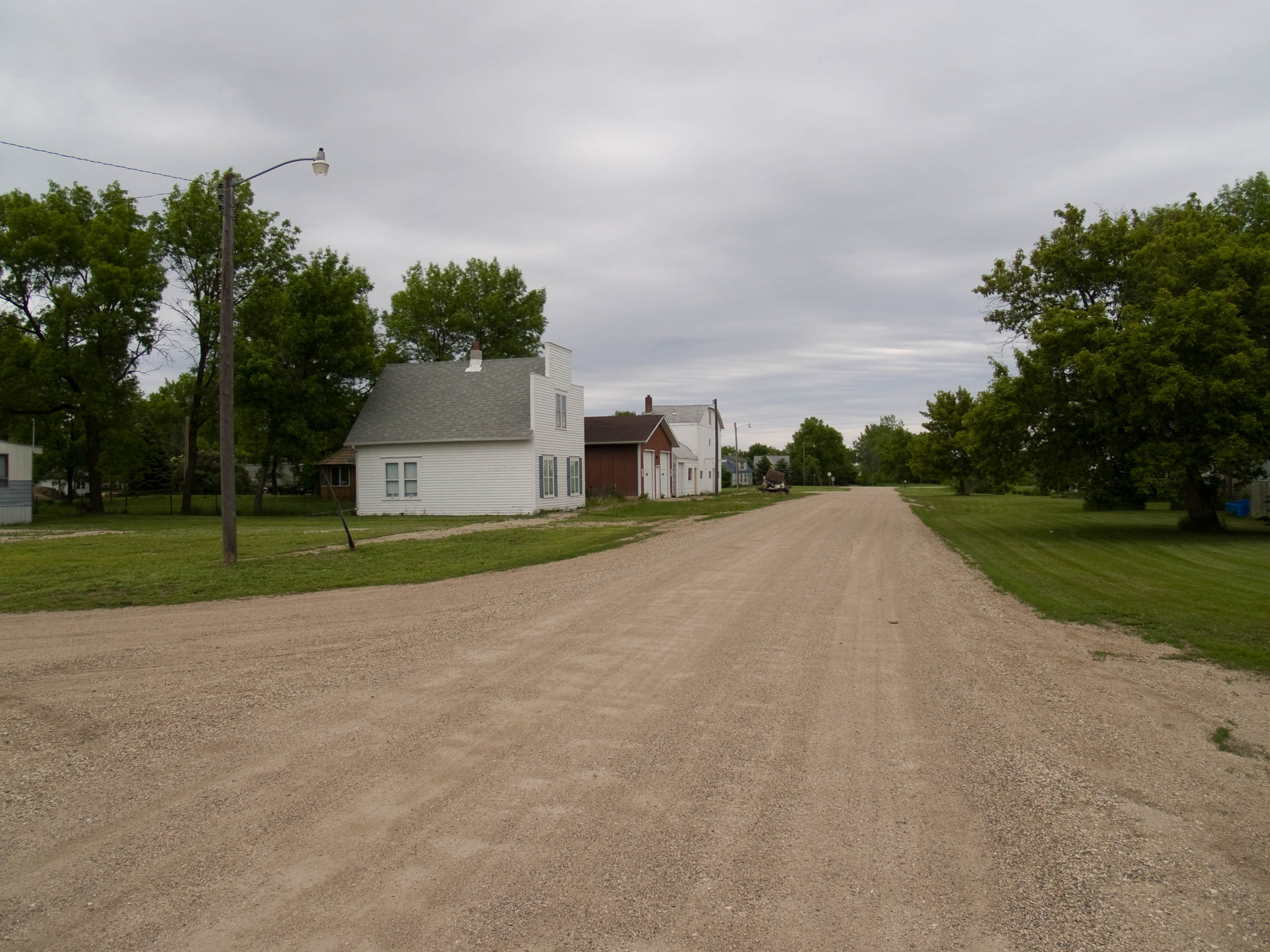
- Street in Nome

- Location of Nome, North Dakota

- Location within North Dakota Location within the United States
- Coordinates: 46°40′40″N 97°48′46″W
- Country: United States
- State: North Dakota
- County: Barnes
- Founded: 1901

Area
  - Total: 0.41 sq mi (1.07 km^{2})
  - Land: 0.41 sq mi (1.07 km^{2})
  - Water: 0 sq mi (0.00 km^{2})
- Elevation: 1,339 ft (408 m)

Population (2020)
  - Total: 51
  - Estimate (2022): 50
  - Density: 123.1/sq mi (47.53/km^{2})
- Time zone: UTC-6 (Central (CST))
  - Summer (DST): UTC-5 (CDT)
- ZIP code: 58062
- Area code: 701
- FIPS code: 38-57180
- GNIS feature ID: 1030421

Nome is a city in Barnes County, North Dakota, United States. The population was 51 at the 2020 census. Nome was founded in 1901.

== Geography ==
Nome is located at 46°40′40″N 97°48′46″W (46.677767, -97.812869).

According to the United States Census Bureau, the city has a total area of 0.41 square miles (1.06 km^{2}), all land.

== Demographics ==
Historical population
| Census | Pop. | Note | %± |
|---|---|---|---|
| 1910 | 218 | | — |
| 1920 | 267 | | 22.5% |
| 1930 | 218 | | −18.4% |
| 1940 | 277 | | 27.1% |
| 1950 | 217 | | −21.7% |
| 1960 | 145 | | −33.2% |
| 1970 | 103 | | −29.0% |
| 1980 | 67 | | −35.0% |
| 1990 | 82 | | 22.4% |
| 2000 | 70 | | −14.6% |
| 2010 | 62 | | −11.4% |
| 2020 | 51 | | −17.7% |
| 2022 (est.) | 50 | | −2.0% |
U.S. Decennial Census; 2020 Census

Nome is the home of Inter-Community Telephone Company http://ictc.com

=== 2010 census ===
As of the census of 2010, there were 62 people, 25 households, and 19 families living in the city. The population density was 151.2 inhabitants per square mile (58.4/km^{2}). There were 35 housing units at an average density of 85.4 per square mile (33.0/km^{2}). The racial makeup of the city was 100.0% White.

There were 25 households, of which 28.0% had children under the age of 18 living with them, 68.0% were married couples living together, 4.0% had a female householder with no husband present, 4.0% had a male householder with no wife present, and 24.0% were non-families. 24.0% of all households were made up of individuals, and 12% had someone living alone who was 65 years of age or older. The average household size was 2.48 and the average family size was 2.95.

The median age in the city was 47.5 years. 25.8% of residents were under the age of 18; 3.3% were between the ages of 18 and 24; 19.3% were from 25 to 44; 27.5% were from 45 to 64; and 24.2% were 65 years of age or older. The gender makeup of the city was 54.8% male and 45.2% female.

=== 2000 census ===
As of the census of 2000, there were 70 people, 31 households, and 20 families living in the city. The population density was 168.8 inhabitants per square mile (65.2/km^{2}). There were 38 housing units at an average density of 91.6 per square mile (35.4/km^{2}). The racial makeup of the city was 95.71% White, and 4.29% from two or more races.

There were 31 households, out of which 29.0% had children under the age of 18 living with them, 58.1% were married couples living together, 3.2% had a female householder with no husband present, and 32.3% were non-families. 32.3% of all households were made up of individuals, and 22.6% had someone living alone who was 65 years of age or older. The average household size was 2.26 and the average family size was 2.86.

In the city, the population was spread out, with 25.7% under the age of 18, 4.3% from 18 to 24, 24.3% from 25 to 44, 14.3% from 45 to 64, and 31.4% who were 65 years of age or older. The median age was 43 years. For every 100 females, there were 100.0 males. For every 100 females age 18 and over, there were 108.0 males.

The median income for a household in the city was $28,500, and the median income for a family was $30,833. Males had a median income of $31,250 versus $16,875 for females. The per capita income for the city was $11,973. There were 7.7% of families and 12.5% of the population living below the poverty line, including 30.0% of under eighteens and 7.7% of those over 64.
