= Glendale Township, Logan County, North Dakota =

Coordinates: 46°35′00″N 99°42′31″W

Glendale Township
- Township
- Location in North Dakota
- Country: United States
- State: North Dakota
- County: Logan
- Time zone: UTC-6 (CST)

Glendale Township is one of the nine townships of Logan County, North Dakota, United States. It lies in the northwestern part of the county and borders the following other townships within Logan County:

- Dixon Unorganized Territory — southeast corner
- Bryant Township — south
- Sealy Township — west
