= Logan County, North Dakota =

County in North Dakota, United States

- County
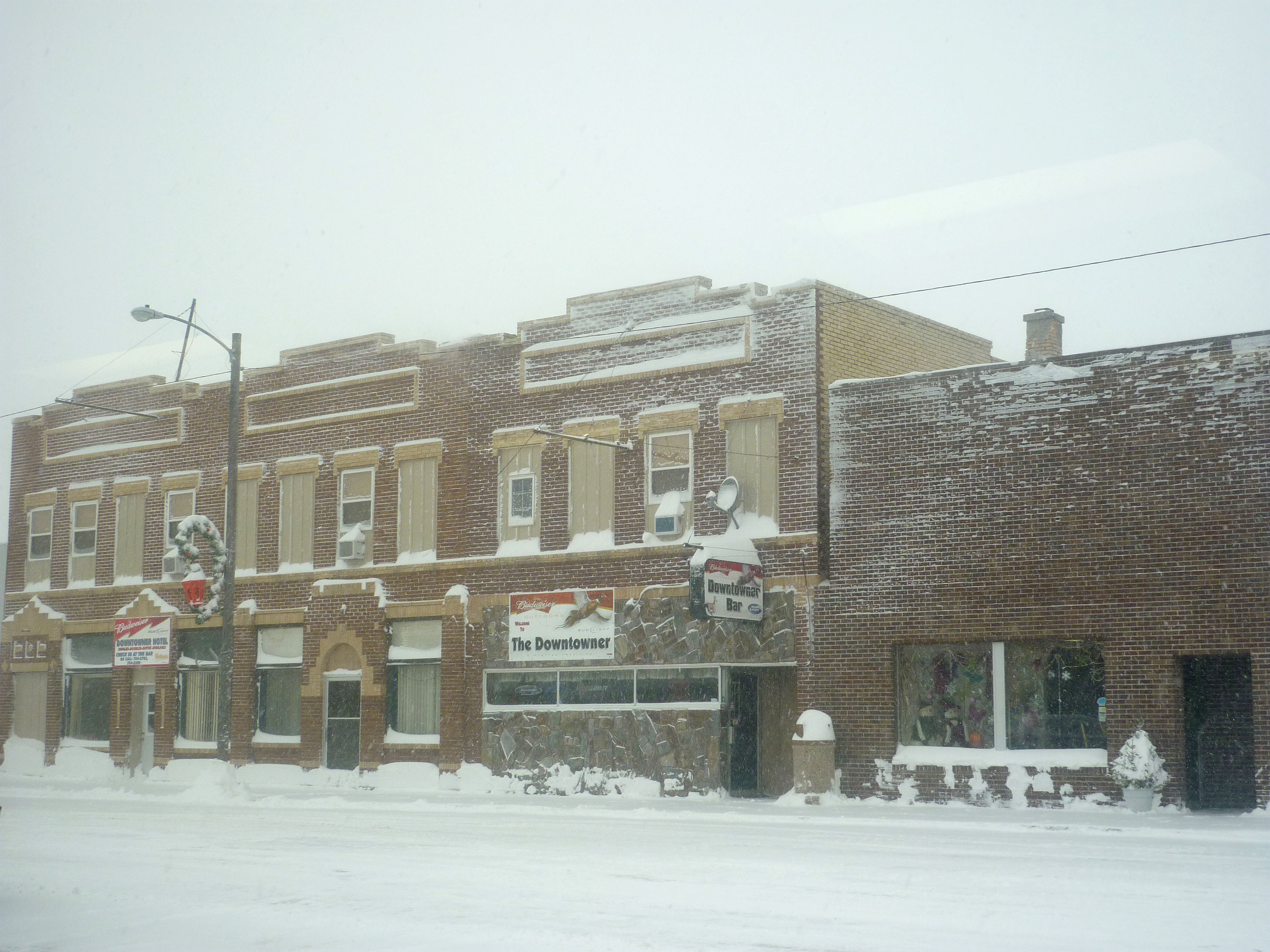
- Winter view of downtown Napoleon.

- Location within the U.S. state of North Dakota
- Coordinates: 46.469278°N 99.504585°W
- Country: United States
- State: North Dakota
- Founded: January 4, 1873 (created); September 1, 1884 (organized)
- Named for: John A. Logan
- Seat: Napoleon
- Largest city: Napoleon

Area
  - Total: 1,011.020 sq mi (2,618.53 km^{2})
  - Land: 992.599 sq mi (2,570.82 km^{2})
  - Water: 18.421 sq mi (47.71 km^{2}) 1.82%

Population (2020)
  - Total: 1,876
  - Estimate (2025): 1,859 ▼
  - Density: 1.894/sq mi (0.731/km^{2})
- Time zone: UTC−6 (Central)
  - Summer (DST): UTC−5 (CDT)
- Area code: 701
- Congressional district: At-large
- Website: logancountynd.com

Logan County is a county in the U.S. state of North Dakota. As of the 2020 census, the population was 1,876. The county seat and the largest city is Napoleon. According to the website mob-rule.com, Logan County is the least visited county in the continental US.

== History ==
The Dakota Territory legislature created the county on January 4, 1873. It was named for John A. Logan (1826–1886), a Civil War general and United States Senator from Illinois. The county government was not organized at that time, but the county was not attached to another county for administrative or judicial purposes. The county government organization was established on September 1, 1884.

The county's boundaries were altered in 1883. They have remained in the present configuration since that time. Napoleon was the county seat from 1884 to 1899. King briefly became the county seat in 1899 before Napoleon was once again given that title.

== Geography ==
The Logan County terrain consists of rolling hills, dotted with lakes and ponds. The area is largely devoted to agriculture. The terrain slopes to the east, with its highest point near its southwestern corner at 2,133 ft (650 m) ASL.

According to the United States Census Bureau, the county has a total area of 1,011.020 square miles (2,618.53 km^{2}), of which 992.599 square miles (2,570.82 km^{2}) is land and 18.421 square miles (47.71 km^{2}) (1.82%) is water. It is the 39th largest county in North Dakota by total area.

=== Major highways ===
- North Dakota Highway 3
- North Dakota Highway 13
- North Dakota Highway 30
- North Dakota Highway 34
- North Dakota Highway 56

=== Adjacent counties ===
- Stutsman County - northeast
- LaMoure County - east
- McIntosh County - south
- Emmons County - west
- Kidder County - northwest

=== Protected areas ===
- Arnies Lake
- Beaver Lake
- Doyles Lake
- Fish Lake (part)
- Island Lake
- McKenna Lake
- Red Lake
- Round Lake

=== Protected areas ===
- Beaver Lake State Park

== Demographics ==
Historical population
Census	Pop.	Note	%±
1890	597		—
1900	1,625		172.2%
1910	6,168		279.6%
1920	7,723		25.2%
1930	8,089		4.7%
1940	7,561		−6.5%
1950	6,357		−15.9%
1960	5,369		−15.5%
1970	4,245		−20.9%
1980	3,493		−17.7%
1990	2,847		−18.5%
2000	2,308		−18.9%
2010	1,990		−13.8%
2020	1,876		−5.7%
2025 (est.)	1,859	▼	−0.9%
U.S. Decennial Census; 1790–1960 1900–1990; 1990–2000 2010–2020

As of the fourth quarter of 2024, the median home value in Logan County was $107,863.

=== 2020 census ===
As of the 2020 census, the county had a population of 1,876. Of the residents, 24.1% were under 18 and 25.9% were 65 or older; the median age was 47.9 years. For every 100 females, there were 108.0 males, and for every 100 females age 18 and over, there were 110.0 males.

The racial makeup of the county was 94.8% White, 0.1% Black or African American, 0.7% American Indian and Alaska Native, 0.0% Asian, 0.9% from some other race, and 3.5% from two or more races. Hispanic or Latino residents of any race comprised 1.9% of the population.

There were 791 households in the county, of which 26.2% had children under the age of 18 living with them, and 17.2% had a female householder with no spouse or partner present. About 34.4% of all households were made up of individuals, and 19.0% had someone living alone who was 65 years of age or older.

There were 1,078 housing units, of which 26.6% were vacant. Among occupied housing units, 81.4% were owner-occupied, and 18.6% were renter-occupied. The homeowner vacancy rate was 1.4%, and the rental vacancy rate was 22.8%.

=== 2010 census ===
As of the census of 2010, there were 1,990 people, 843 households, and 562 families in the county. The population density was 2.0 inhabitants per square mile (0.77/km^{2}). There were 1,144 housing units at an average density of 1.2 per square mile (0.46/km^{2}). The racial makeup of the county was 98.4% white, 0.5% American Indian, 0.3% Asian, 0.1% black or African American, 0.1% from other races, and 0.7% from two or more races. Those of Hispanic or Latino origin made up 0.6% of the population. In terms of ancestry, 76.0% were German, 16.2% were Russian, 9.9% were Norwegian, and 6.3% were American. The county has the highest share of Russian-Americans out of any county in the United States.

Of the 843 households, 21.8% had children under the age of 18 living with them, 61.4% were married couples living together, 3.0% had a female householder with no husband present, 33.3% were non-families, and 30.8% of all households were made up of individuals. The average household size was 2.28, and the average family size was 2.84. The median age was 49.8 years.

The median income for a household in the county was $41,741, and the median income for a family was $52,262. Males had a median income of $34,451 versus $22,284 for females. The county's per capita income was $21,654. About 8.3% of families and 10.9% of the population were below the poverty line, including 7.5% of those under age 18 and 18.9% of those age 65 or over.

== Communities ==
=== Cities ===
- Fredonia
- Gackle
- Lehr (partly in McIntosh County)
- Napoleon (county seat)

=== Unincorporated communities ===
- Burnstad
- Guyson

=== Townships ===
- Finn
- Glendale
- Gutschmidt
- Haag
- Janke
- Red Lake
- Sealy

=== Unorganized territories ===
- East Logan
- West Logan

=== Defunct townships ===
- Bryant (now in West Logan UT)
- Dixon (now in West Logan UT)
- Kroeber
- Starkey (now in West Logan UT)

== Politics ==
Logan County voters have traditionally voted Republican. In no national election since 1936 has the county selected the Democratic Party candidate.

United States presidential election results for Logan County, North Dakota
Year	Republican		Democratic		Third party(ies)	
Year	No.	%	No.	%	No.	%
1900	231	86.52%	35	13.11%	1	0.37%
1904	454	92.84%	31	6.34%	4	0.82%
1908	711	81.44%	143	16.38%	19	2.18%
1912	269	39.91%	146	21.66%	259	38.43%
1916	567	64.14%	260	29.41%	57	6.45%
1920	1,590	89.68%	154	8.69%	29	1.64%
1924	787	43.34%	29	1.60%	1,000	55.07%
1928	1,013	43.64%	1,293	55.71%	15	0.65%
1932	390	14.09%	2,350	84.93%	27	0.98%
1936	984	34.36%	1,292	45.11%	588	20.53%
1940	2,572	83.59%	498	16.18%	7	0.23%
1944	1,904	86.47%	294	13.35%	4	0.18%
1948	1,585	71.46%	557	25.11%	76	3.43%
1952	2,165	85.10%	369	14.50%	10	0.39%
1956	1,807	76.63%	547	23.20%	4	0.17%
1960	1,601	64.07%	898	35.93%	0	0.00%
1964	1,187	55.44%	951	44.42%	3	0.14%
1968	1,416	70.45%	459	22.84%	135	6.72%
1972	1,408	69.33%	554	27.28%	69	3.40%
1976	944	50.32%	809	43.12%	123	6.56%
1980	1,474	79.03%	283	15.17%	108	5.79%
1984	1,222	72.91%	401	23.93%	53	3.16%
1988	1,111	66.49%	540	32.32%	20	1.20%
1992	703	47.31%	383	25.77%	400	26.92%
1996	705	53.09%	360	27.11%	263	19.80%
2000	812	70.92%	223	19.48%	110	9.61%
2004	844	74.69%	265	23.45%	21	1.86%
2008	726	68.68%	299	28.29%	32	3.03%
2012	810	75.49%	232	21.62%	31	2.89%
2016	888	83.22%	114	10.68%	65	6.09%
2020	930	86.43%	128	11.90%	18	1.67%
2024	898	86.93%	117	11.33%	18	1.74%

== Education ==
School districts include:

- Gackle-Streeter Public School District 56
- Ashley Public School District 9
- Kulm Public School District 7
- Napoleon Public School District 2
- Wishek Public School District 19

== See also ==
- National Register of Historic Places listings in Logan County, North Dakota
