= Streeter, North Dakota =

- City
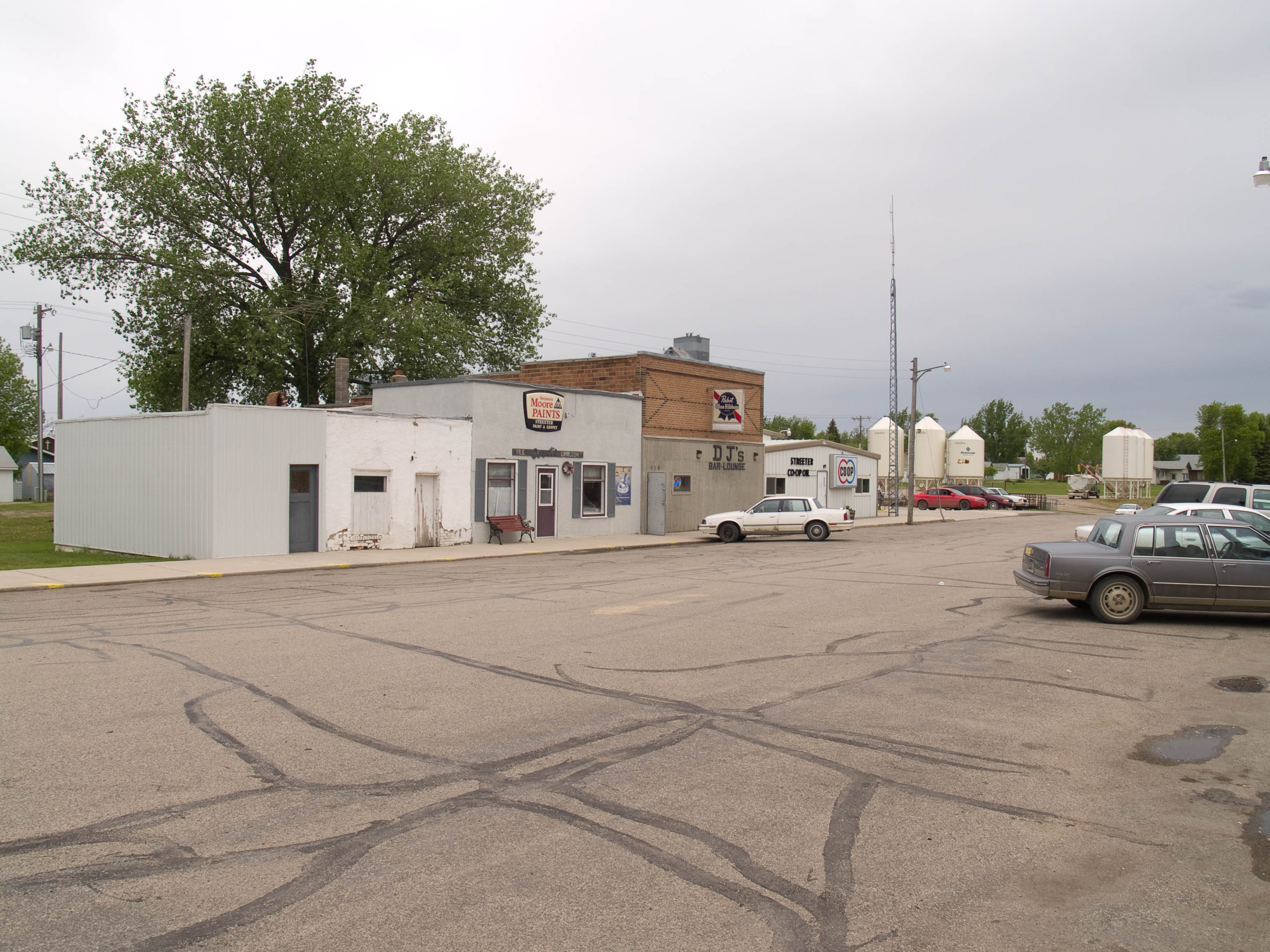
- Business district of Streeter

- Location of Streeter, North Dakota
- Coordinates: 46°39′27″N 99°21′25″W
- Country: United States
- State: North Dakota
- County: Stutsman
- Founded: 1905

Area
  - Total: 0.36 sq mi (0.92 km^{2})
  - Land: 0.36 sq mi (0.92 km^{2})
  - Water: 0 sq mi (0.00 km^{2})
- Elevation: 1,942 ft (592 m)

Population (2020)
  - Total: 149
  - Estimate (2022): 148
  - Density: 417.3/sq mi (161.12/km^{2})
- Time zone: UTC-6 (Central (CST))
  - Summer (DST): UTC-5 (CDT)
- ZIP code: 58483
- Area code: 701
- FIPS code: 38-76620
- GNIS feature ID: 1036289

Streeter is a city in Stutsman County, North Dakota, United States. The population was 149 at the 2020 census. Founded in 1905, Streeter celebrated its centennial in July 2005 with a weekend festival.

The city is at one end of what is considered the straightest road in America, with the other end being Hickson. The road consists of Highway 30 in the west to Highway 46 in the east.

== History ==
The post office at present-day Streeter was established as Bloomenfield on February 28, 1893, and the town was founded and named Streeter in the spring of 1905, when the homestead owned by Alex Anderson was plotted and sold to the public. The first streets in the city were named after Anderson's two daughters, Frances and Florence. Streeter was named in honor of Darwin Reed Streeter, a pioneer newspaper editor and legislator from Emmons County, who was very well known throughout the state.

The town experienced a severe fire on January 12, 1911, which destroyed the city's bank, two general stores, and a drug store.

Streeter officially became a city in 1950, and its first mayor was Oscar Seher. The city reached a peak population of 602 that year, a number which has since fallen considerably. In 1955, the community's business infrastructure consisted of five churches, three general stores, a drug store, bank, locker plant, two hardware stores, two cream stations, two electric stores, three service stations, two implement dealers, three bulk stations, two cafes, one hotel, one movie theater, a recreation hall, two blacksmith shops, a plumbing supply shop, barber shop, four grain elevators, a lumber yard, a poultry egg and feed store, and two taverns.

The Streeter Centennial was held over the weekend of July 1–3 in 2005. The festivities included class reunions, a parade, flea markets, and antique galleries. It concluded with a golf tournament, and a church service. An estimated 4,000 people attended the three-day event, including 700 Streeter alumni.

== Geography ==
According to the United States Census Bureau, the city has a total area of 0.35 square miles (0.91 km^{2}), all land.

== Demographics ==
Historical population
Census	Pop.	Note	%±
1920	640		—
1930	711		11.1%
1940	647		−9.0%
1950	602		−7.0%
1960	491		−18.4%
1970	324		−34.0%
1980	264		−18.5%
1990	161		−39.0%
2000	172		6.8%
2010	170		−1.2%
2020	149		−12.4%
2022 (est.)	148		−0.7%
U.S. Decennial Census; 2020 Census

=== 2010 census ===
As of the census of 2010, there were 170 people, 81 households, and 48 families residing in the city. The population density was 485.7 inhabitants per square mile (187.5/km^{2}). There were 125 housing units at an average density of 357.1 per square mile (137.9/km^{2}). The racial makeup of the city was 97.1% White, 2.4% Asian, and 0.6% from two or more races.

There were 81 households, of which 17.3% had children under the age of 18 living with them, 51.9% were married couples living together, 6.2% had a female householder with no husband present, 1.2% had a male householder with no wife present, and 40.7% were non-families. 32.1% of all households were made up of individuals, and 23.4% had someone living alone who was 65 years of age or older. The average household size was 2.10 and the average family size was 2.67.

The median age in the city was 52.8 years. 17.6% of residents were under the age of 18; 4.2% were between the ages of 18 and 24; 17.1% were from 25 to 44; 31.7% were from 45 to 64; and 29.4% were 65 years of age or older. The gender makeup of the city was 50.0% male and 50.0% female.

=== 2000 census ===
As of the census of 2000, there were 172 people, 86 households, and 46 families residing in the city. The population density was 508.2 inhabitants per square mile (196.2/km^{2}). There were 125 housing units at an average density of 369.3 per square mile (142.6/km^{2}). The racial makeup of the city was 99.42% White and 0.58% Native American.

There were 86 households, out of which 22.1% had children under the age of 18 living with them, 47.7% were married couples living together, 4.7% had a female householder with no husband present, and 46.5% were non-families. 43.0% of all households were made up of individuals, and 30.2% had someone living alone who was 65 years of age or older. The average household size was 2.00 and the average family size was 2.76.

In the city, the population was spread out, with 20.9% under the age of 18, 4.7% from 18 to 24, 16.3% from 25 to 44, 22.7% from 45 to 64, and 35.5% who were 65 years of age or older. The median age was 56 years. For every 100 females, there were 95.5 males. For every 100 females age 18 and over, there were 91.5 males.

The median income for a household in the city was $20,000, and the median income for a family was $38,500. Males had a median income of $29,444 versus $21,250 for females. The per capita income for the city was $13,545. About 13.3% of families and 20.2% of the population were below the poverty line, including 37.8% of those under the age of eighteen and 7.4% of those 65 or over.
