= Wyndmere, North Dakota =

- City
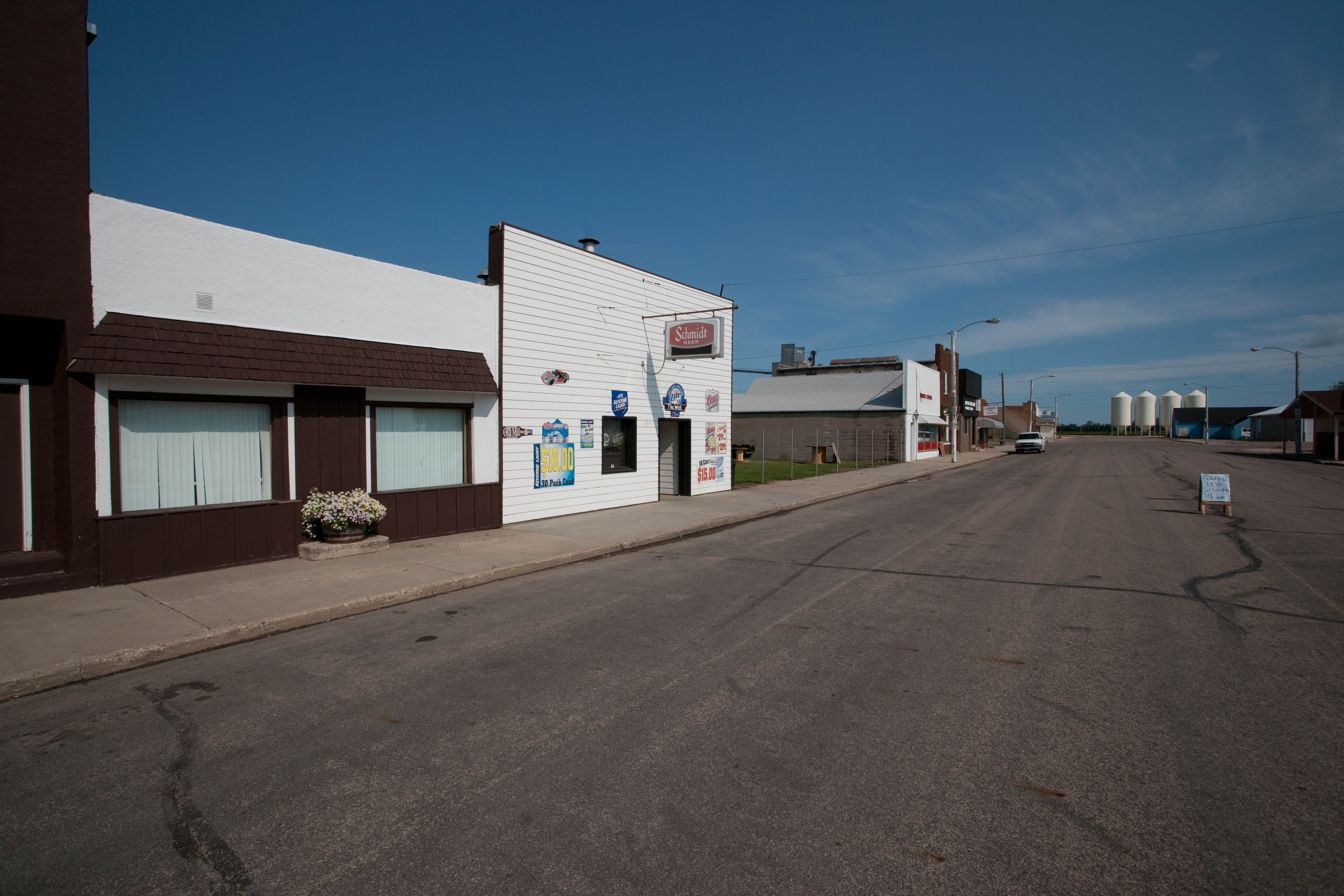
- Central Wyndmere, August 2009

- Logo
- Interactive map of Wyndmere, North Dakota
- Location within North Dakota
- Coordinates: 46.2641°N 97.1312°W
- Country: United States
- State: North Dakota
- County: Richland
- Founded: 1883
- Named for: Windermere

Government
  - Mayor: Nathan Brandt

Area
  - Total: 0.860 sq mi (2.228 km^{2})
  - Land: 0.860 sq mi (2.228 km^{2})
  - Water: 0 sq mi (0.000 km^{2}) 0.00%
- Elevation: 1,060 ft (323 m)

Population (2020)
  - Total: 454
  - Estimate (2025): 442
  - Density: 528/sq mi (204/km^{2})
- Time zone: UTC–6 (Central (CST))
  - Summer (DST): UTC–5 (CDT)
- ZIP Code: 58081
- Area code: 701
- FIPS code: 38-87740
- GNIS feature ID: 1036343
- Website: cityofwyndmere.com

Wyndmere (/ˈwaɪnmɪər/ WINE-meer) is a city in Richland County, North Dakota, United States. The population was 454 as of the 2020 census, and was estimated at 442 in 2025. It is part of the Wahpeton, ND–MN Micropolitan Statistical Area.

== History ==
Wyndmere was founded in 1883 and named after Windermere in England.

== Geography ==
According to the United States Census Bureau, the city has a total area of 0.860 square miles (2.23 km^{2}), all land.

== Demographics ==
Historical population
Census	Pop.	Note	%±
1910	439		—
1920	570		29.8%
1930	521		−8.6%
1940	499		−4.2%
1950	627		25.7%
1960	644		2.7%
1970	516		−19.9%
1980	550		6.6%
1990	501		−8.9%
2000	533		6.4%
2010	429		−19.5%
2020	454		5.8%
2025 (est.)	442		−2.6%
U.S. Decennial Census; 2020 Census

=== 2020 census ===
As of the 2020 census, there were 454 people, 192 households, 113 families residing in the city.

=== 2010 census ===
As of the 2010 census, there were 429 people, 192 households, and 117 families living in the city. The population density was 487.5 inhabitants per square mile (188.2/km^{2}). There were 226 housing units at an average density of 256.8 per square mile (99.2/km^{2}). The racial makeup of the city was 95.6% White, 0.2% Native American, 0.2% Asian, 2.6% from other races, and 1.4% from two or more races. Hispanic or Latino people of any race were 6.1% of the population.

There were 192 households, of which 27.1% had children under the age of 18 living with them, 52.6% were married couples living together, 4.2% had a female householder with no husband present, 4.2% had a male householder with no wife present, and 39.1% were non-families. 35.9% of all households were made up of individuals, and 13.6% had someone living alone who was 65 years of age or older. The average household size was 2.23 and the average family size was 2.86.

The median age in the city was 43.6 years. 25.4% of residents were under the age of 18; 4.1% were between the ages of 18 and 24; 22.4% were from 25 to 44; 29.4% were from 45 to 64; and 18.9% were 65 years of age or older. The gender makeup of the city was 53.6% male and 46.4% female.

=== 2000 census ===
As of the 2000 census, there were 533 people, 214 households, and 144 families living in the city. The population density was 608.7 inhabitants per square mile (235.0/km^{2}). There were 247 housing units at an average density of 282.1 per square mile (108.9/km^{2}). The racial makeup of the city was 97.56% White, 0.19% Native American, 0.19% Asian, 1.31% from other races, and 0.75% from two or more races. Hispanic or Latino people of any race were 1.31% of the population.

There were 214 households, out of which 35.5% had children under the age of 18 living with them, 57.5% were married couples living together, 5.1% had a female householder with no husband present, and 32.7% were non-families. 27.1% of all households were made up of individuals, and 12.6% had someone living alone who was 65 years of age or older. The average household size was 2.49 and the average family size was 3.06.

In the city, the population was spread out, with 28.5% under the age of 18, 6.8% from 18 to 24, 27.6% from 25 to 44, 19.9% from 45 to 64, and 17.3% who were 65 years of age or older. The median age was 38 years. For every 100 females, there were 105.0 males. For every 100 females age 18 and over, there were 102.7 males.

The median income for a household in the city was $42,143, and the median income for a family was $45,833. Males had a median income of $32,054 versus $22,000 for females. The per capita income for the city was $15,288. About 1.4% of families and 5.8% of the population were below the poverty line, including 6.9% of those under age 18 and 6.5% of those age 65 or over.

== Notable people ==
- Orin D. Haugen, World War II-era Army Colonel
- John Kenneth Hilliard, acoustical and electrical engineer
- Chuck Klosterman, journalist
- Hans Langseth, owner of the longest beard recorded
