= Lehr, North Dakota =

- Town
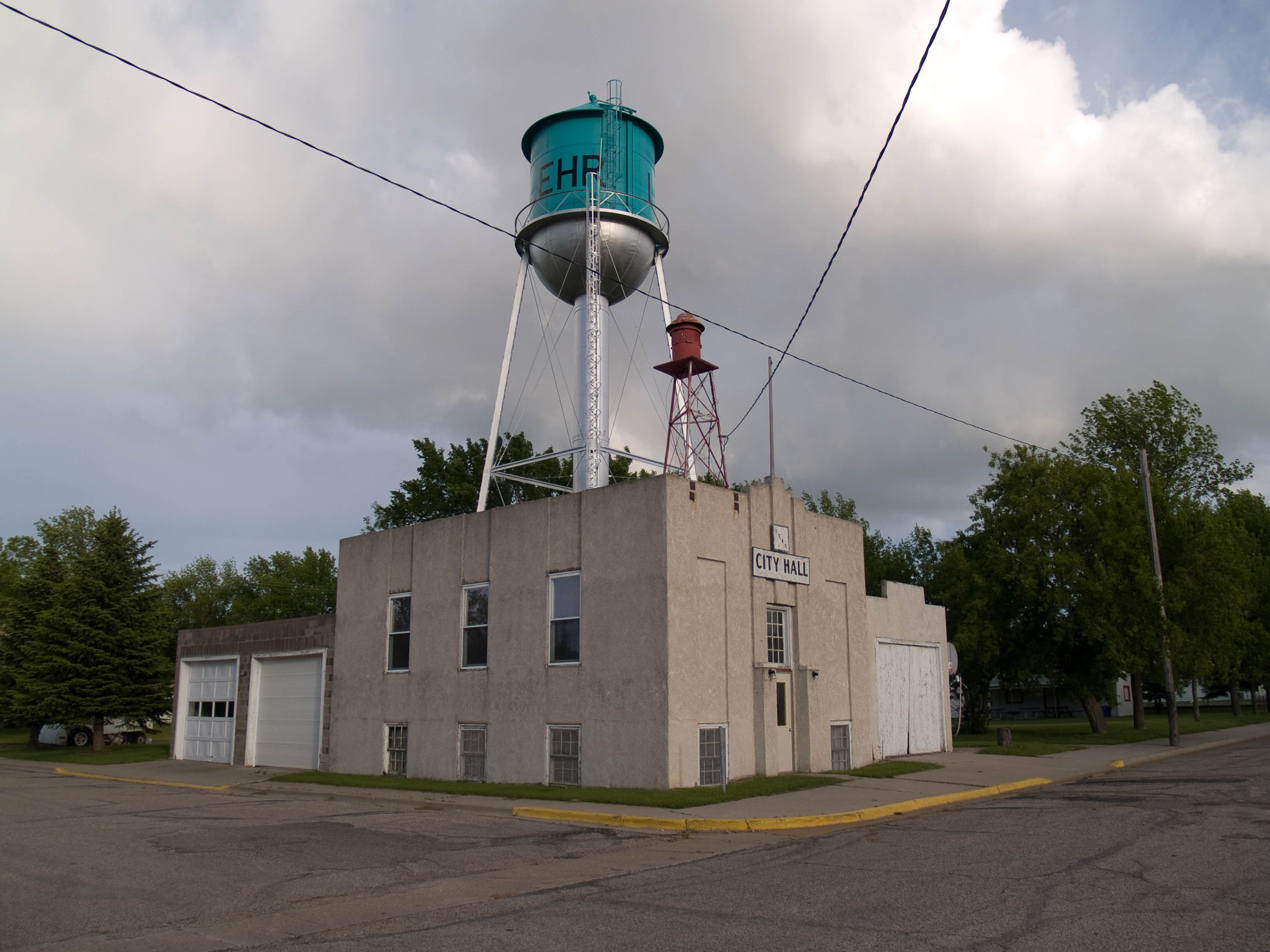
- Lehr City Hall and Water Tower

- Location of Lehr, North Dakota
- Coordinates: 46°16′57″N 99°21′11″W
- Country: United States
- State: North Dakota
- Counties: McIntosh, Logan
- Founded: 1898

Area
  - Total: 0.19 sq mi (0.50 km^{2})
  - Land: 0.19 sq mi (0.50 km^{2})
  - Water: 0 sq mi (0.00 km^{2})
- Elevation: 2,064 ft (629 m)

Population (2020)
  - Total: 81
  - Estimate (2022): 81
  - Density: 422.1/sq mi (162.99/km^{2})
- Time zone: UTC-6 (Central (CST))
  - Summer (DST): UTC-5 (CDT)
- ZIP code: 58460
- Area code: 701
- FIPS code: 38-45740
- GNIS feature ID: 1036125

Lehr is a city in Logan and McIntosh counties in the State of North Dakota. The population was 81 at the 2020 census. Lehr was founded in 1898.

== Geography ==
According to the United States Census Bureau, the city has a total area of 0.19 square miles (0.49 km^{2}), all land.

Lehr is located on a county line with the north part of the city in Logan County and the south part in McIntosh County.

== Demographics ==
Historical population
Census	Pop.	Note	%±
1910	182		—
1920	362		98.9%
1930	458		26.5%
1940	536		17.0%
1950	394		−26.5%
1960	381		−3.3%
1970	287		−24.7%
1980	254		−11.5%
1990	191		−24.8%
2000	114		−40.3%
2010	80		−29.8%
2020	81		1.3%
2022 (est.)	81		0.0%
U.S. Decennial Census; 2020 Census

=== 2010 census ===
As of the census of 2010, there were 80 people, 50 households, and 24 families residing in the city. The population density was 421.1 inhabitants per square mile (162.6/km^{2}). There were 100 housing units at an average density of 526.3 per square mile (203.2/km^{2}). The racial makeup of the city was 100.0% White.

There were 50 households, of which 4.0% had children under the age of 18 living with them, 48.0% were married couples living together, and 52.0% were non-families. 46.0% of all households were made up of individuals, and 34% had someone living alone who was 65 years of age or older. The average household size was 1.60 and the average family size was 2.13.

The median age in the city was 70 years. 2.5% of residents were under the age of 18; 5.1% were between the ages of 18 and 24; 5.1% were from 25 to 44; 28.9% were from 45 to 64; and 58.8% were 65 years of age or older. The gender makeup of the city was 52.5% male and 47.5% female.

=== 2000 census ===
Languages (2000)	Percent
Spoke English at home	57.14%
Spoke German at home	42.86%

As of the census of 2000, there were 114 people, 65 households, and 36 families residing in the city. The population density was 638.8 inhabitants per square mile (246.6/km^{2}). There were 98 housing units at an average density of 549.1 per square mile (212.0/km^{2}). The racial makeup of the city was 99.12% White and 0.88% Native American.

There were 65 households, out of which 4.6% had children under the age of 18 living with them, 47.7% were married couples living together, 6.2% had a female householder with no husband present, and 43.1% were non-families. 40.0% of all households were made up of individuals, and 29.2% had someone living alone who was 65 years of age or older. The average household size was 1.75 and the average family size was 2.24.

In the city, the population was spread out, with 6.1% under the age of 18, 5.3% from 18 to 24, 16.7% from 25 to 44, 27.2% from 45 to 64, and 44.7% who were 65 years of age or older. The median age was 63 years. For every 100 females, there were 90.0 males. For every 100 females age 18 and over, there were 91.1 males.

The median income for a household in the city was $20,938, and the median income for a family was $28,750. Males had a median income of $21,563 versus $13,333 for females. The per capita income for the city was $13,912. There were 11.1% of families and 13.9% of the population living below the poverty line, including no under eighteens and 15.2% of those over 64.
