= White Rock, South Dakota =

- Town
- Location in Roberts County and the state of South Dakota
- Coordinates: 45°55′29″N 96°34′34″W
- Country: United States
- State: South Dakota
- County: Roberts

Area
  - Total: 1.57 sq mi (4.07 km^{2})
  - Land: 1.57 sq mi (4.07 km^{2})
  - Water: 0 sq mi (0.00 km^{2})
- Elevation: 974 ft (297 m)

Population (2020)
  - Total: 6
  - Density: 3.8/sq mi (1.47/km^{2})
- Time zone: UTC-6 (Central (CST))
  - Summer (DST): UTC-5 (CDT)
- Area code: 605
- FIPS code: 46-71380
- GNIS feature ID: 1267654

White Rock is a town in Roberts County, South Dakota, United States, along the Bois de Sioux River. The population was 6 at the 2020 census. White Rock is the most northeastern community in South Dakota, being along the Minnesota border and one mile south of North Dakota.

== History ==
A post office called White Rock was established in 1885, and remained in operation until 1965. White Rock took its name from a white granite boulder near the original town site. The namesake boulder was destroyed and a grain elevator was built at the spot. A historical marker stands at the corner of Haggert Ave. (the main east/west road along the north side of town) and 2nd St. (one of the two main north /south streets).

== Geography ==
According to the United States Census Bureau, the town has a total area of 1.57 square miles (4.07 km^{2}), all land.

== Demographics ==
Historical population
Census	Pop.	Note	%±
1900	170		—
1910	368		116.5%
1920	353		−4.1%
1930	281		−20.4%
1940	220		−21.7%
1950	113		−48.6%
1960	76		−32.7%
1970	35		−53.9%
1980	10		−71.4%
1990	7		−30.0%
2000	18		157.1%
2010	3		−83.3%
2020	6		100.0%
U.S. Decennial Census; 2013 Estimate

=== 2010 census ===
As of the census of 2010, there were 3 people, 3 households, and 0 families residing in the town. The population density was 1.9 inhabitants per square mile (0.7/km^{2}). There were 8 housing units at an average density of 5.1 per square mile (2.0/km^{2}). The racial makeup of the town was 33.3% White, 33.3% Native American, and 33.3% from other races. Hispanic or Latino of any race were 33.3% of the population.

There were 3 households, of which 100.0% were non-families. 100.0% of all households were made up of individuals, and 33.3% had someone living alone who was 65 years of age or older. The average household size was 1.00 and the average family size was 0.00.

The median age in the town was 60.5 years. 0.0% of residents were under the age of 18; 0.0% were between the ages of 18 and 24; 0.0% were from 25 to 44; 66.6% were from 45 to 64; and 33.3% were 65 years of age or older. The gender makeup of the town was 100.0% male and 0.0% female.

=== 2000 census ===
As of the census of 2000, there were 18 people, 2 households, and 0 families residing in the town. The population density was 11.4 people per square mile (4.4/km^{2}). There were 6 housing units at an average density of 3.8 per square mile (1.5/km^{2}). The racial makeup of the town was 100.00% White.

There were 2 households, out of which none had children under the age of 18 living with them, none were married couples living together, and 100.0% were non-families. 100.0% of all households were made up of individuals, and none had someone living alone who was 65 years of age or older. The average household size was 1.00 and the average family size was 0.00.

In the town, the population was spread out, with 5.6% from 25 to 44, 5.6% from 45 to 64, and 88.9% who were 65 years of age or older. The median age was 90 years. For every 100 females, there were 38.5 males. For every 100 females age 18 and over, there were 38.5 males.

The median income for a household in the town was $3,750, and the median income for a family was $0. Males had a median income of $0 versus $0 for females. The per capita income for the town was $22,883. There were no families and 100.0% of the population living below the poverty line, including no under eighteens and none of those over 64.
