= Napoleon, North Dakota =

- City
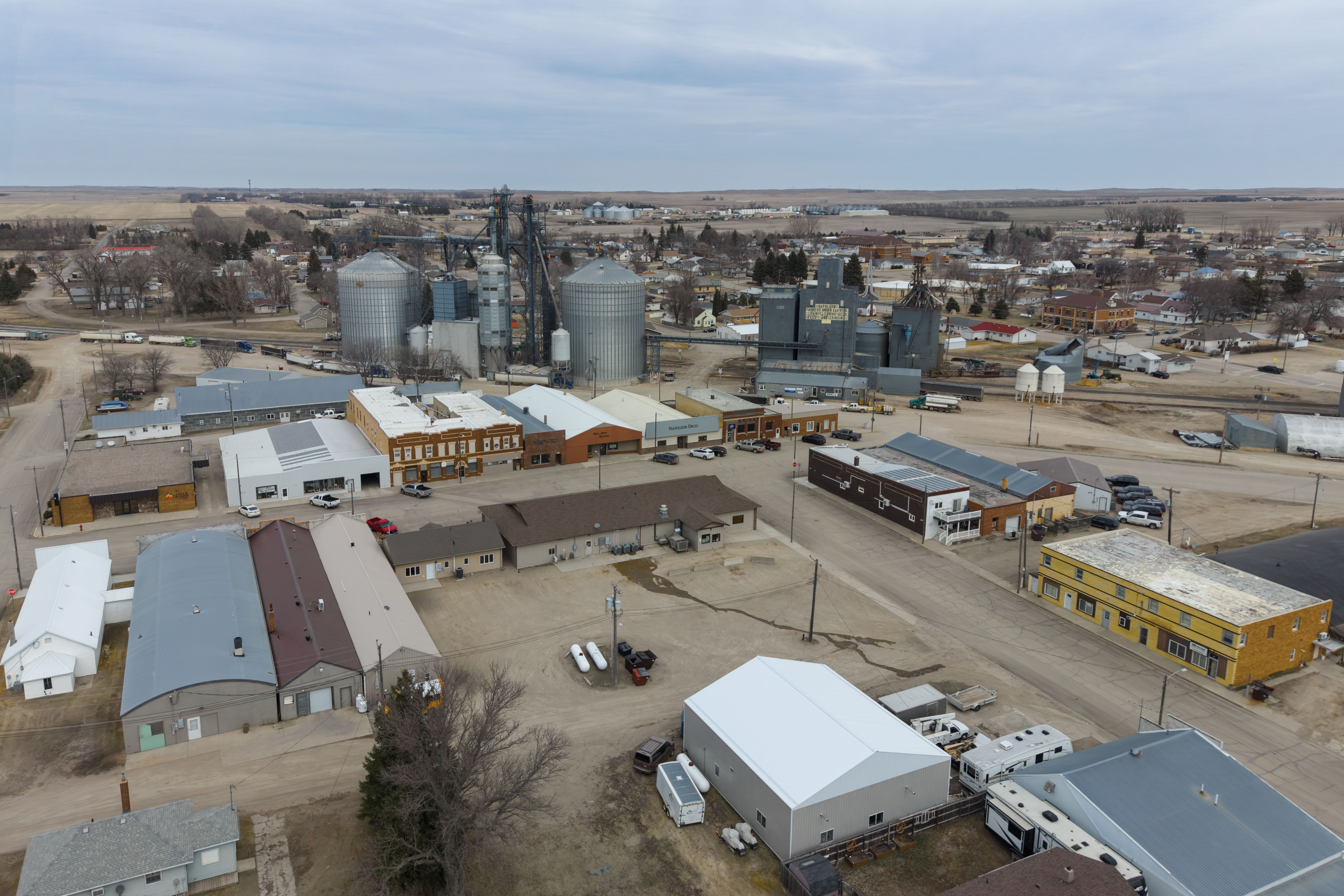
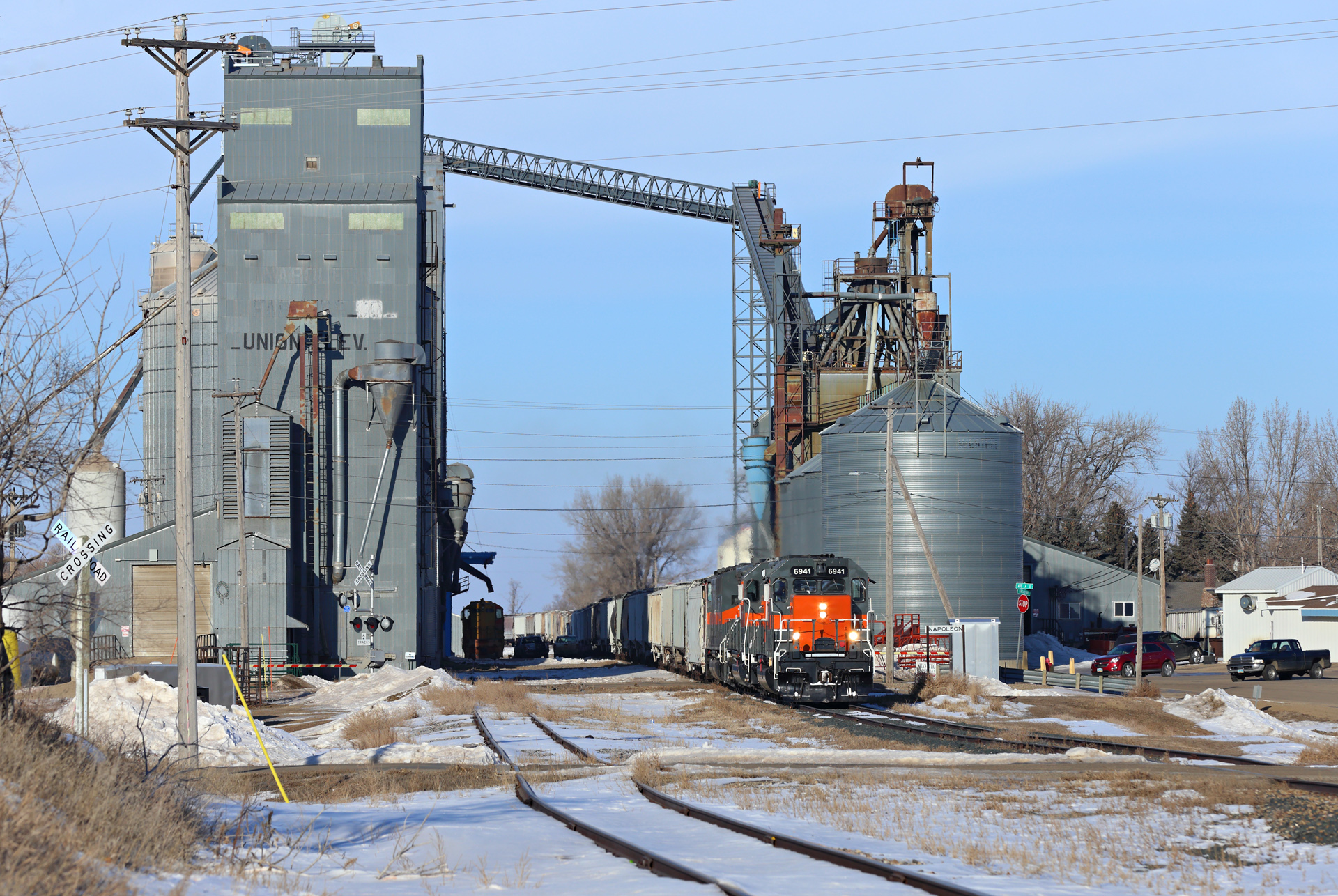
- Downtown Napoleon A corn train passes the Farmers Union Elevator
- Motto: Come to visit...or spend a lifetime
- Interactive map of Napoleon, North Dakota
- Location within North Dakota
- Coordinates: 46.5039°N 99.7683°W
- Country: United States
- State: North Dakota
- County: Logan
- Founded: 1886
- Incorporated (village): May 4, 1914
- Incorporated (city): March 18, 1947
- Named after: Napoleon Goodsill

Government
  - Type: Mayor–council
  - Mayor: Todd Moos
  - Auditor: Colleen Fettig
  - Councilmembers: Mike Heying; Rod Kleppe; Bob Humann; Clark Haas; Rich Bjerklie; John Wald
  - Park Board Members: Bridget Piatz; Mary Schwartzenberger; Kevin Wolf; Kriss McCleary; Brooklyn Fettig

Area
  - City: 1.383 sq mi (3.581 km^{2})
  - Land: 1.383 sq mi (3.581 km^{2})
  - Water: 0 sq mi (0.000 km^{2}) 0.00%
- Elevation: 1,959 ft (597 m)

Population (2020)
  - City: 749
  - Estimate (2025): 738
  - Density: 542/sq mi (209/km^{2})
  - Metro: 1,859
- Time zone: UTC–6 (Central (CST))
  - Summer (DST): UTC–5 (CDT)
- ZIP Code: 58561
- Area code: 701
- FIPS code: 38-55420
- GNIS feature ID: 1036175
- Highways: ND 3, ND 34
- Website: napoleonnd.com

Napoleon is a city in and the county seat of Logan County, North Dakota, United States. The population was 749 as of the 2020 census, and was estimated at 738 in 2025.

== History ==
Napoleon was founded in 1886 and named for Napoleon Goodsill, a realtor from Steele who promoted the site. The Logan County Courthouse was built in 1921. Napoleon was incorporated as a village on May 4, 1914 and as a city on March 18, 1947.

== Geography ==
According to the United States Census Bureau, the city has a total area of 1.383 square miles (3.58 km^{2}), all land.

== Climate ==
This climatic region is typified by large seasonal temperature differences, with warm to hot (and often humid) summers and cold (sometimes severely cold) winters. According to the Köppen Climate Classification system, Napoleon has a humid continental climate, abbreviated "Dfb" on climate maps.

Climate data for Napoleon, North Dakota (1991–2020 normals, extremes 1893–present)
Month	Jan	Feb	Mar	Apr	May	Jun	Jul	Aug	Sep	Oct	Nov	Dec	Year
Record high °F (°C)	57 (14)	63 (17)	87 (31)	94 (34)	107 (42)	108 (42)	118 (48)	111 (44)	107 (42)	95 (35)	76 (24)	70 (21)	118 (48)
Mean daily maximum °F (°C)	19.8 (−6.8)	24.4 (−4.2)	36.7 (2.6)	52.9 (11.6)	65.9 (18.8)	75.4 (24.1)	81.6 (27.6)	80.7 (27.1)	71.1 (21.7)	55.3 (12.9)	38.4 (3.6)	25.0 (−3.9)	52.3 (11.3)
Daily mean °F (°C)	10.2 (−12.1)	14.2 (−9.9)	26.5 (−3.1)	40.8 (4.9)	53.8 (12.1)	64.1 (17.8)	69.6 (20.9)	68.0 (20.0)	58.6 (14.8)	43.9 (6.6)	28.5 (−1.9)	16.3 (−8.7)	41.2 (5.1)
Mean daily minimum °F (°C)	0.5 (−17.5)	4.0 (−15.6)	16.4 (−8.7)	28.8 (−1.8)	41.8 (5.4)	52.8 (11.6)	57.7 (14.3)	55.4 (13.0)	46.1 (7.8)	32.6 (0.3)	18.6 (−7.4)	7.5 (−13.6)	30.2 (−1.0)
Record low °F (°C)	−46 (−43)	−47 (−44)	−34 (−37)	−11 (−24)	8 (−13)	25 (−4)	25 (−4)	25 (−4)	10 (−12)	−8 (−22)	−27 (−33)	−48 (−44)	−48 (−44)
Average precipitation inches (mm)	0.55 (14)	0.56 (14)	0.93 (24)	1.69 (43)	2.82 (72)	3.83 (97)	3.06 (78)	2.40 (61)	1.79 (45)	1.73 (44)	0.66 (17)	0.71 (18)	20.73 (527)
Average snowfall inches (cm)	9.6 (24)	7.9 (20)	9.2 (23)	5.7 (14)	0.7 (1.8)	0.0 (0.0)	0.0 (0.0)	0.0 (0.0)	0.0 (0.0)	2.5 (6.4)	6.6 (17)	11.0 (28)	53.2 (135)
Average precipitation days (≥ 0.01 in)	6.6	6.0	6.4	6.8	9.9	10.6	9.0	7.0	7.0	6.5	5.1	6.4	87.3
Average snowy days (≥ 0.1 in)	7.0	5.9	4.6	1.8	0.2	0.0	0.0	0.0	0.0	1.2	3.8	6.6	31.1
Source 1: National Oceanic and Atmospheric Administration
Source 2: National Centers for Environmental Information

== Demographics ==
Historical population
Census	Pop.	Note	%±
1920	554		—
1930	709		28.0%
1940	982		38.5%
1950	1,070		9.0%
1960	1,078		0.7%
1970	1,036		−3.9%
1980	1,103		6.5%
1990	930		−15.7%
2000	857		−7.8%
2010	792		−7.6%
2020	749		−5.4%
2025 (est.)	738		−1.5%
U.S. Decennial Census; 2020 Census

As of the 2024 American Community Survey, there were 321 estimated households in Napoleon with an average of 2.26 persons per household. The city has a median household income of $68,750. Approximately 16.0% of the city's population lives at or below the poverty line. Napoleon has an estimated 59.5% employment rate, with 23.1% of the population holding a bachelor's degree or higher and 86.9% holding a high school diploma. There were 421 housing units at an average density of 304.41 per square mile (117.53/km^{2}).

The top five reported languages (people were allowed to report up to two languages, thus the figures will generally add to more than 100%) were English (93.4%), Spanish (2.9%), Indo-European (3.6%), Asian and Pacific Islander (0.0%), and Other (0.0%).

The median age in the city was 41.8 years.

Napoleon, North Dakota – racial and ethnic composition Note: the US Census treats Hispanic/Latino as an ethnic category. This table excludes Latinos from the racial categories and assigns them to a separate category. Hispanics/Latinos may be of any race.
Race / ethnicity (NH = non-Hispanic)	Pop. 2000	Pop. 2010	Pop. 2020	% 2000	% 2010	% 2020
White alone (NH)	844	777	706	98.48%	98.11%	94.26%
Black or African American alone (NH)	0	1	1	0.00%	0.13%	0.13%
Native American or Alaska Native alone (NH)	0	5	6	0.00%	0.63%	0.80%
Asian alone (NH)	3	0	0	0.35%	0.00%	0.00%
Pacific Islander alone (NH)	0	0	0	0.00%	0.00%	0.00%
Other race alone (NH)	1	0	1	0.12%	0.00%	0.13%
Mixed race or multiracial (NH)	5	1	23	0.58%	0.13%	3.07%
Hispanic or Latino (any race)	4	8	12	0.47%	1.01%	1.60%
Total	857	792	749	100.00%	100.00%	100.00%

=== 2020 census ===
As of the 2020 census, there were 749 people, 316 households, and 187 families residing in the city. The population density was 541.58 inhabitants per square mile (209.11/km^{2}). There were 396 housing units at an average density of 286.33 per square mile (110.55/km^{2}). The racial makeup of the city was 94.26% White, 0.13% African American, 0.93% Native American, 0.00% Asian, 0.00% Pacific Islander, 1.20% from some other races and 3.47% from two or more races. Hispanic or Latino people of any race were 1.60% of the population.

=== 2010 census ===
As of the 2010 census, there were 792 people, 337 households, and 203 families residing in the city. The population density was 564.50 inhabitants per square mile (217.95/km^{2}). There were 401 housing units at an average density of 285.82 per square mile (110.36/km^{2}). The racial makeup of the city was 98.36% White, 0.13% African American, 0.63% Native American, 0.00% Asian, 0.00% Pacific Islander, 0.25% from some other races and 0.63% from two or more races. Hispanic or Latino people of any race were 1.01% of the population.

There were 337 households, of which 21.7% had children under the age of 18 living with them, 55.5% were married couples living together, 3.0% had a female householder with no husband present, 1.8% had a male householder with no wife present, and 39.8% were non-families. 37.7% of all households were made up of individuals, and 19% had someone living alone who was 65 years of age or older. The average household size was 2.23 and the average family size was 2.97.

The median age in the city was 48.9 years. 23.4% of residents were under the age of 18; 4.1% were between the ages of 18 and 24; 17.5% were from 25 to 44; 22.5% were from 45 to 64; and 32.3% were 65 years of age or older. The gender makeup of the city was 48.2% male and 51.8% female.

=== 2000 census ===
As of the 2000 census, there were 857 people, 367 households and 238 families residing in the city. The population density was 616.80 inhabitants per square mile (238.15/km^{2}). There were 420 housing units at an average density of 302.28 per square mile (116.71/km^{2}). The racial makeup of the city was 98.83% White, 0.00% African American, 0.00% Native American, 0.35% Asian, 0.00% Pacific Islander, 0.23% from some other races and 0.58% from two or more races. Hispanic or Latino people of any race were 0.47% of the population.

There were 367 households, of which 22.3% had children under the age of 18 living with them, 58.0% were married couples living together, 4.9% had a female householder with no husband present, and 35.1% were non-families. 31.6% of all households were made up of individuals, and 19.3% had someone living alone who was 65 years of age or older. The average household size was 2.24 and the average family size was 2.82.

Age distribution was 22.1% under the age of 18, 3.7% from 18 to 24, 18.7% from 25 to 44, 22.3% from 45 to 64, and 33.3% who were 65 years of age or older. The median age was 50 years. For every 100 females, there were 90.9 males. For every 100 females age 18 and over, there were 85.6 males.

The median household income was $28,167, and the median family income was $36,042. Males had a median income of $28,036 versus $20,000 for females. The per capita income for the city was $16,208. About 5.9% of families and 8.8% of the population were below the poverty line, including 5.4% of those under age 18 and 15.3% of those age 65 or over.

== Education ==
The Napoleon Public School District 2

- Napoleon High School

The area is served by the Napoleon Public School District 2. It operates the Napoleon School. In the 2025-26 academic year, the district reported a total of 252 students.

== Notable people ==
Joey Schmidt, accordionist
