= Fairmount, North Dakota =

City in Richland County, North Dakota, United States

- City
- Motto: Where the Sun Shines First in North Dakota
- Location of Fairmount, North Dakota
- Coordinates: 46°03′17″N 96°36′10″W
- Country: United States
- State: North Dakota
- County: Richland
- Founded: 1884

Area
  - Total: 0.33 sq mi (0.86 km^{2})
  - Land: 0.33 sq mi (0.86 km^{2})
  - Water: 0 sq mi (0.00 km^{2})
- Elevation: 980 ft (300 m)

Population (2020)
  - Total: 343
  - Estimate (2022): 337
  - Density: 1,035.3/sq mi (399.74/km^{2})
- Time zone: UTC-6 (Central (CST))
  - Summer (DST): UTC-5 (CDT)
- ZIP code: 58030
- Area code: 701
- FIPS code: 38-25300
- GNIS feature ID: 1036029

Fairmount is a city in Richland County, North Dakota, United States. The population was 343 at the 2020 census. Fairmount was founded in 1884. It is part of the Wahpeton, ND–MN Micropolitan Statistical Area.

In July 1884, a tornado destroyed the schoolhouse in Fairmount. Fifteen students were injured, and the teacher's leg was fractured.

== Geography ==
Fairmount is located in southeastern North Dakota on North Dakota Highway 11. It is approximately four miles west of the junction of Minnesota Highway 55 and U.S. Route 75. Fairmount is six miles west of Tenney, Minnesota, 63 miles south of Fargo, and 176 miles northwest of Minneapolis, Minnesota. The village is also 15 miles East of Hankinson and 15 miles south of Wahpeton.

According to the United States Census Bureau, the city has a total area of 0.32 square miles (0.83 km^{2}), all land.

== Demographics ==
Historical population
Census	Pop.	Note	%±
1890	91		—
1900	284		212.1%
1910	387		36.3%
1920	706		82.4%
1930	611		−13.5%
1940	705		15.4%
1950	660		−6.4%
1960	503		−23.8%
1970	412		−18.1%
1980	480		16.5%
1990	427		−11.0%
2000	406		−4.9%
2010	367		−9.6%
2020	343		−6.5%
2022 (est.)	337		−1.7%
U.S. Decennial Census; 2020 Census

=== 2010 census ===
As of the census of 2010, there were 367 people, 153 households, and 98 families living in the city. The population density was 1,146.9 inhabitants per square mile (442.8/km^{2}). There were 195 housing units at an average density of 609.4 per square mile (235.3/km^{2}). The racial makeup of the city was 94.0% White, 0.3% African American, 1.6% Native American, 0.3% Asian, 1.4% from other races, and 2.5% from two or more races. Hispanic or Latino of any race were 2.7% of the population.

There were 153 households, of which 32.0% had children under the age of 18 living with them, 49.0% were married couples living together, 9.2% had a female householder with no husband present, 5.9% had a male householder with no wife present, and 35.9% were non-families. 32.0% of all households were made up of individuals, and 15.7% had someone living alone who was 65 years of age or older. The average household size was 2.40 and the average family size was 3.00.

The median age in the city was 37.9 years. 27.2% of residents were under the age of 18; 7.3% were between the ages of 18 and 24; 20.7% were from 25 to 44; 29.1% were from 45 to 64; and 15.5% were 65 years of age or older. The gender makeup of the city was 51.0% male and 49.0% female.

=== 2000 census ===
As of the census of 2000, there were 406 people, 174 households, and 104 families living in the city. The population density was 1,234.2 inhabitants per square mile (476.5/km^{2}). There were 202 housing units at an average density of 614.0 per square mile (237.1/km^{2}). The racial makeup of the city was 95.07% White, 2.46% Native American, 0.49% from other races, and 1.97% from two or more races. Hispanic or Latino of any race were 2.46% of the population.

There were 174 households, out of which 32.8% had children under the age of 18 living with them, 50.0% were married couples living together, 8.6% had a female householder with no husband present, and 39.7% were non-families. 34.5% of all households were made up of individuals, and 16.1% had someone living alone who was 65 years of age or older. The average household size was 2.33 and the average family size was 3.05.

In the city, the population was spread out, with 27.8% under the age of 18, 6.4% from 18 to 24, 28.3% from 25 to 44, 22.7% from 45 to 64, and 14.8% who were 65 years of age or older. The median age was 39 years. For every 100 females, there were 96.1 males. For every 100 females age 18 and over, there were 99.3 males.

The median income for a household in the city was $37,143, and the median income for a family was $42,813. Males had a median income of $30,417 versus $25,536 for females. The per capita income for the city was $15,492. About 10.9% of families and 11.0% of the population were below the poverty line, including 19.0% of those under age 18 and 10.7% of those age 65 or over.

== Education ==
Fairmount Public School, a K-12 school, is the public school in Fairmount.

== See also ==
- List of cities in North Dakota
