= Fredonia, North Dakota =

Fredonia
- City
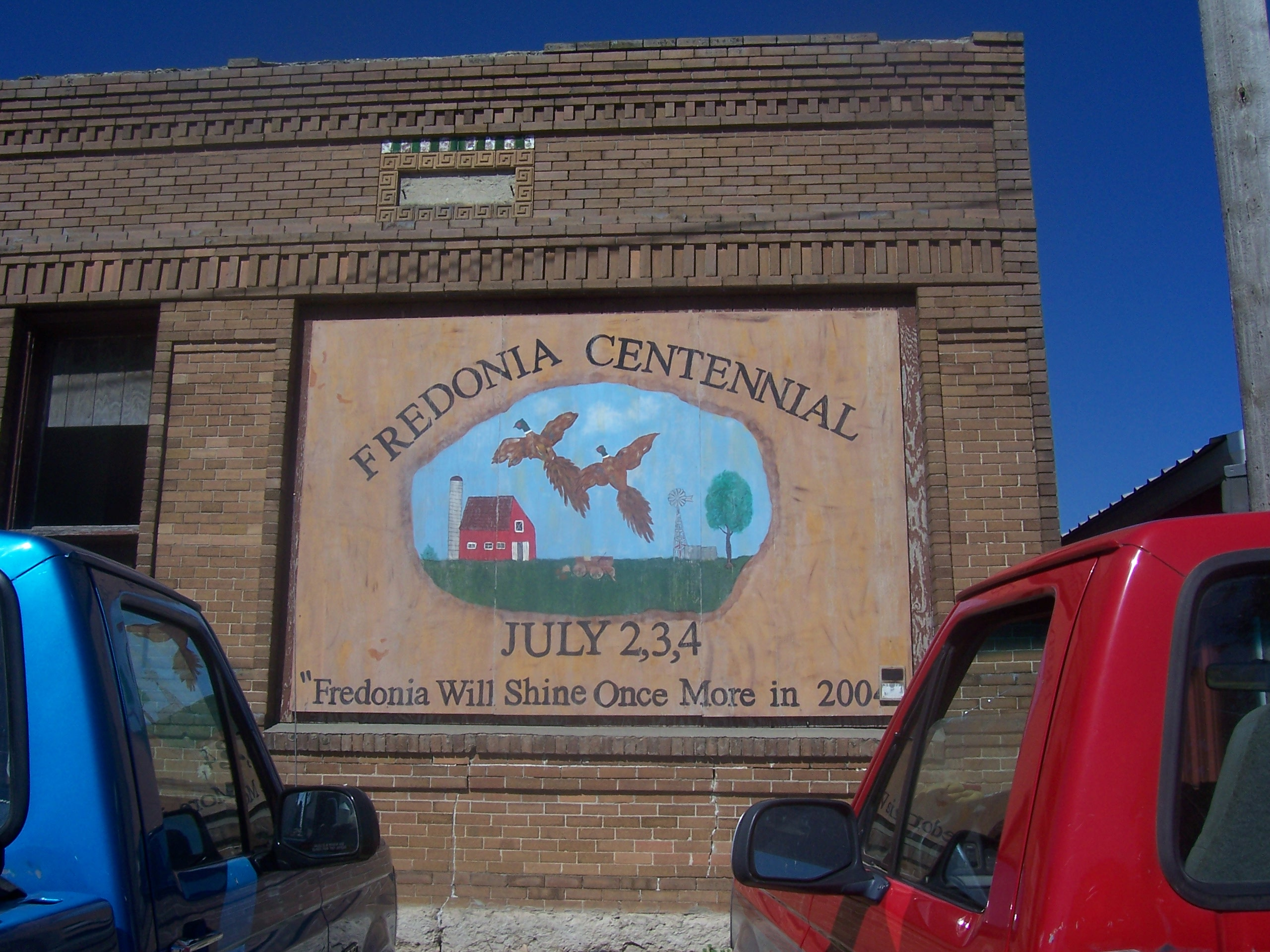

- Location of Fredonia, North Dakota
- Coordinates: 46°19′45″N 99°05′44″W
- Country: United States
- State: North Dakota
- County: Logan
- Founded: 1905

Area
  - Total: 0.24 sq mi (0.62 km^{2})
  - Land: 0.24 sq mi (0.62 km^{2})
  - Water: 0 sq mi (0.00 km^{2})
- Elevation: 2,054 ft (626 m)

Population (2020)
  - Total: 38
  - Estimate (2022): 37
  - Density: 158.1/sq mi (61.04/km^{2})
- Time zone: UTC–6 (Central (CST))
  - Summer (DST): UTC–5 (CDT)
- ZIP Code: 58440
- Area code: 701
- FIPS code: 38-28380
- GNIS feature ID: 1036045

Fredonia is a city in Logan County, North Dakota, United States. The population was 38 at the 2020 census. Fredonia was founded in 1905.

== Geography ==
According to the United States Census Bureau, the city has a total area of 0.24 square miles (0.62 km^{2}), all land.

== Demographics ==
Historical population
Census	Pop.	Note	%±
1920	296		—
1930	394		33.1%
1940	309		−21.6%
1950	268		−13.3%
1960	141		−47.4%
1970	100		−29.1%
1980	82		−18.0%
1990	66		−19.5%
2000	51		−22.7%
2010	46		−9.8%
2020	38		−17.4%
2022 (est.)	37		−2.6%
U.S. Decennial Census; 2020 Census

=== 2010 census ===
As of the census of 2010, there were 46 people, 23 households, and 16 families residing in the city. The population density was 191.7 inhabitants per square mile (74.0/km^{2}). There were 37 housing units at an average density of 154.2 per square mile (59.5/km^{2}). The racial makeup of the city was 100.0% White.

There were 23 households, of which 21.7% had children under the age of 18 living with them, 60.9% were married couples living together, 4.3% had a female householder with no husband present, 4.3% had a male householder with no wife present, and 30.4% were non-families. 30.4% of all households were made up of individuals, and 13% had someone living alone who was 65 years of age or older. The average household size was 2.00 and the average family size was 2.25.

The median age in the city was 49.7 years. 17.4% of residents were under the age of 18; 2.1% were between the ages of 18 and 24; 19.5% were from 25 to 44; 45.6% were from 45 to 64; and 15.2% were 65 years of age or older. The gender makeup of the city was 56.5% male and 43.5% female.

=== 2000 census ===
As of the census of 2000, there were 51 people, 22 households and 13 families residing in the city. The population density was 212.9 inhabitants per square mile (82.2/km^{2}). There were 30 housing units at an average density of 125.2 per square mile (48.3/km^{2}). The racial makeup of the city was 96.08% White. Hispanic or Latino of any race were 3.92% of the population.

There were 22 households, of which 27.3% had children under the age of 18 living with them, 59.1% were married couples living together, and 40.9% were non-families. 36.4% of all households were made up of individuals, and 18.2% had someone living alone who was 65 years of age or older. The average household size was 2.32 and the average family size was 3.08.

23.5% of the population were under the age of 18, 2.0% from 18 to 24, 31.4% from 25 to 44, 27.5% from 45 to 64, and 15.7% who were 65 years of age or older. The median age was 40 years. For every 100 females, there were 88.9 males. For every 100 females age 18 and over, there were 95.0 males.

The median household income was $25,313 and the median family income was $36,250. Males had a median income of $21,563 versus $6,875 for females. The per capita income for the city was $15,837. There were 12.5% of families and 23.7% of the population living below the poverty line, including 42.9% of under eighteens and 33.3% of those over 64.
