= Gackle, North Dakota =

- City
- Location of Gackle, North Dakota
- Coordinates: 46°37′35″N 99°08′28″W
- Country: United States
- State: North Dakota
- County: Logan
- Founded: 1904

Area
  - Total: 0.55 sq mi (1.43 km^{2})
  - Land: 0.54 sq mi (1.39 km^{2})
  - Water: 0.012 sq mi (0.03 km^{2})
- Elevation: 1,939 ft (591 m)

Population (2020)
  - Total: 281
  - Estimate (2022): 280
  - Density: 522.3/sq mi (201.67/km^{2})
- Time zone: UTC-6 (Central (CST))
  - Summer (DST): UTC-5 (CDT)
- ZIP code: 58442
- Area code: 701
- FIPS code: 38-28860
- GNIS feature ID: 1036048
- Website: gacklend.com

Gackle is a city in Logan County, North Dakota, United States. The population was 281 at the 2020 census.

== History ==
Gackle was founded in 1904. It was named for George Gackle, a farmer.

The town is home to the Gackle Public Library. German has been spoken in Gackle in the past, and is visible in the inscriptions on the First UCC Church.

== Geography ==
According to the United States Census Bureau, the city has a total area of 0.55 square miles (1.42 km^{2}), of which 0.54 square miles (1.40 km^{2}) is land and 0.01 square miles (0.03 km^{2}) is water.

== Demographics ==
Historical population
Census	Pop.	Note	%±
1920	424		—
1930	493		16.3%
1940	537		8.9%
1950	604		12.5%
1960	523		−13.4%
1970	470		−10.1%
1980	456		−3.0%
1990	450		−1.3%
2000	335		−25.6%
2010	310		−7.5%
2020	281		−9.4%
2022 (est.)	280		−0.4%
U.S. Decennial Census; 2020 Census

=== 2010 census ===
As of the census of 2010, there were 310 people, 138 households, and 81 families residing in the city. The population density was 574.1 inhabitants per square mile (221.7/km^{2}). There were 211 housing units at an average density of 390.7 per square mile (150.9/km^{2}). The racial makeup of the city was 97.1% White, 0.3% African American, 1.0% Native American, 1.0% Asian, and 0.6% from two or more races. Hispanic or Latino of any race were 0.6% of the population.

There were 138 households, of which 13.8% had children under the age of 18 living with them, 53.6% were married couples living together, 3.6% had a female householder with no husband present, 1.4% had a male householder with no wife present, and 41.3% were non-families. 34.8% of all households were made up of individuals, and 16.7% had someone living alone who was 65 years of age or older. The average household size was 2.01 and the average family size was 2.56.

The median age in the city was 56.9 years. 13.2% of residents were under the age of 18; 4.2% were between the ages of 18 and 24; 15.2% were from 25 to 44; 32.7% were from 45 to 64; and 34.8% were 65 years of age or older. The gender makeup of the city was 47.7% male and 52.3% female.

=== 2000 census ===
As of the census of 2000, there were 335 people, 163 households, and 93 families residing in the city. The population density was 617.3 inhabitants per square mile (238.3/km^{2}). There were 212 housing units at an average density of 390.6 per square mile (150.8/km^{2}). The racial makeup of the city was 99.40% White, and 0.60% from two or more races. Hispanic or Latino of any race were 0.90% of the population. 76.6% were of German and 7.6% Norwegian ancestry.

There were 163 households, out of which 14.7% had children under the age of 18 living with them, 51.5% were married couples living together, 3.7% had a female householder with no husband present, and 42.9% were non-families. 41.7% of all households were made up of individuals, and 27.0% had someone living alone who was 65 years of age or older. The average household size was 1.83 and the average family size was 2.43.

In the city, the population was spread out, with 9.6% under the age of 18, 3.6% from 18 to 24, 15.2% from 25 to 44, 26.3% from 45 to 64, and 45.4% who were 65 years of age or older. The median age was 61 years. For every 100 females, there were 74.5 males. For every 100 females age 18 and over, there were 72.2 males.

The median income for a household in the city was $22,875, and the median income for a family was $26,563. Males had a median income of $17,386 versus $14,375 for females. The per capita income for the city was $15,801. About 7.4% of families and 13.9% of the population were below the poverty line, including 5.7% of those under age 18 and 21.3% of those age 65 or over.
