= Northern Plains Railroad =

Overview
- Headquarters: Fordville, North Dakota
- Reporting mark: NPR
- Locale: Northern North Dakota and Northwest Minnesota
- Dates of operation: 1997–

Technical
- Track gauge: 4 ft 8 1/2 in (1,435 mm) standard gauge

Other
- Website: www.nprail.com

The Northern Plains Railroad (reporting mark NPR) is a short line railroad that operates over 344 miles (554 km) of track in the northern U.S. states of Minnesota and North Dakota.

The railroad interchanges with the Canadian Pacific Kansas City in Kenmare, North Dakota, and Thief River Falls, Minnesota; the Minnesota Northern Railroad in Thief River Falls; and the BNSF Railway in Ardoch, North Dakota.

The railroad has its headquarters in Fordville, North Dakota, where it operates its largest yard facility, and also has a field office in Lansford, North Dakota, where it operates a yard and engine terminal.

As of 2006, the Northern Plains Railroad employed 43 people and handled approximately 17,000 carloads per year. The primary commodities hauled included wheat, barley, durum, and soybeans.

== History ==
=== Formation ===
The Northern Plains Railroad was formed in January 1997 after the Soo Line Railroad, under control as a subsidiary of the Canadian Pacific Railway, decided to lease 388 miles (624 km) of branch line trackage in Minnesota and North Dakota.

The track originally leased to the railroad consisted of the 168-mile (270 km) Devils Lake Subdivision between Thief River Falls, Minnesota, and Harlow, North Dakota, and the 217-mile (349 km) Bisbee Subdivision between Fordville and Kenmare, North Dakota. The two lines formed the Soo Line Railroad's so-called "wheatline" that served as a connection between its main line from Glenwood, Minnesota, to Noyes, Minnesota (and on to Winnipeg, Manitoba, via the Canadian Pacific) and its main line from Glenwood, Minnesota, to Portal, North Dakota (and on to Moose Jaw, Saskatchewan, via the Canadian Pacific).

Before coming under control of the BNSF Railway, the Sarles Subdivision had been owned by the Burlington Northern Railroad and, before that, by the Great Northern Railway. The line was one of the latter railroad's many branch lines built in the early twentieth century to serve communities in northern North Dakota.

=== Merger ===
In 2000 and 2001, the Mohall Central Railroad and the Northern Plains Railroad teamed up to begin operating track sold by the BNSF Railway. The Mohall Central Railroad agreed to purchase and then let the Northern Plains Railroad operate over both a 20-mile (32 km) portion of the Drayton Subdivision between Honeyford, North Dakota, and Voss, North Dakota, and a 43-mile (69 km) portion of the Granville Subdivision between milepost 5.25 (north of Granville, North Dakota) and Mohall, North Dakota.

In fall 2005, the Northern Plains Railroad and the Mohall Central Railroad came together once more to begin operations over a 69-mile (111 km) portion of the BNSF Railway’s Sarles Subdivision between milepost 3.75 (north of Lakota, North Dakota) and Sarles, North Dakota. The BNSF Railway agreed to sell its track to the Mohall Central Railroad. In turn, the Mohall Central Railroad agreed to let the Northern Plains Railroad begin operating over the line. Connecting track near Munich, North Dakota, where the Sarles Subdivision crosses the Bisbee Subdivision, was also put in place. On October 29, 2007, the Mohall Central Railroad filed a notice of exemption to abandon a 44.44-mile (71.52 km) portion of the line in North Dakota between milepost 3.75 north of Lakota and milepost 48.19 at Alsen Junction, approximately 4 miles (6.4 km) south of Munich.

=== Cutbacks ===
After the Mohall Central Railroad purchased the Granville Subdivision, it quickly abandoned a 30-mile (48 km) portion of it between milepost 5.25 and milepost 35.00 (at Forfar siding south of Lansford, North Dakota). The part of the subdivision still in service, 12 miles (19 km), was then renamed the Mohall Subdivision. Likewise, the portion of the Drayton Subdivision that the Mohall Central Railroad had also acquired was renamed the Gilby Subdivision. The portion of the line between Forest River and Voss, North Dakota, was later abandoned.

Both portions of track purchased by the Mohall Central Railroad had been owned by the Burlington Northern Railroad before coming under ownership of the BNSF Railway. Before that, the Mohall Subdivision had formed a 61-mile (98 km) branch line on the Great Northern Railway that stretched from Granville to Sherwood, North Dakota. The Gilby Subdivision, on the other hand, had formed the Northern Pacific Railway’s 250-mile (400 km) main line from Manitoba Junction (near Hawley, Minnesota) to Winnipeg, Manitoba.

In October 2004, the Northern Plains Railroad—acting through its parent, the Soo Line Railroad—abandoned a 28-mile (45 km) portion of the Devils Lake Subdivision between Harlow and Devils Lake, North Dakota. Part of the roadbed had become submerged in the steadily increasing water level of Devils Lake.

In December 2009, the Northern Plains Railroad—again acting through the Soo Line Railroad—abandoned 60.9 miles (98.0 km) of the Bisbee Subdivision between Bisbee and Kramer, North Dakota.

== Locomotive and freight car fleet ==
The Northern Plains Railroad operates around 25 locomotives, mostly largely rebuilt EMD GP35s of various heritages.

The railroad’s official paint scheme contains yellow and navy blue colors arranged in much the same way as the colors on the "yellowbonnets" that once operated on the Atchison, Topeka and Santa Fe Railway were arranged. The words Northern Plains are spelled out on both the nose and the long hood. Many of the locomotives operating on the Northern Plains Railroad continue to wear the colors of their former owners. This includes at least four former Union Pacific Railroad EMD SD40T-2 locomotives.

Most of the freight cars that the Northern Plains Railroad uses are provided by the Canadian Pacific Kansas City, while the rest are provided by the BNSF Railway and Minnesota Northern Railroad.

== Northern Plains rail services ==
The Northern Plains Railroad also operates a railcar repair and locomotive repainting facility in Fordville, North Dakota, under the name Northern Plains Rail Services. The facility contracts with other railroads, shippers, industries, processors, owners, and lessors to make either small-scale or large-scale repairs to freight cars or provide new paint to locomotives. Some of the past locomotive repainting customers have included the Canadian Pacific Railway and the Belt Railway of Chicago.

== Stations on the Northern Plains Railroad ==
=== Bisbee Subdivision ===
- Fordville, North Dakota
- Lankin, North Dakota
- Adams, North Dakota
- Fairdale, North Dakota
- Nekoma, North Dakota
- Loma, North Dakota
- Alsen, North Dakota
- Calio, North Dakota
- Egeland, North Dakota
- Arndt, North Dakota
- Bisbee, North Dakota (also a BNSF station)
- Kramer, North Dakota
- Russell, North Dakota
- Eckman, North Dakota
- Hurd, North Dakota
- Lansford, North Dakota
- Chola, North Dakota
- Grano, North Dakota
- Greene, North Dakota
- Tolley, North Dakota
- Norma, North Dakota
- Kenmare, North Dakota (also a Canadian Pacific station)

=== Devils Lake Subdivision ===
- Thief River Falls, Minnesota (also a Canadian Pacific and Minnesota Northern station)
- Rosewood, Minnesota
- Viking, Minnesota
- Radium, Minnesota
- Warren, Minnesota (also a BNSF station)
- March, Minnesota
- Alvarado, Minnesota
- Oslo, Minnesota
- Poland, North Dakota
- Ardoch, North Dakota (also a BNSF station)
- Forest River, North Dakota
- Ops, North Dakota
- Conway, North Dakota (also a BNSF station)
- Fordville, North Dakota
- Dahlen, North Dakota
- Whitman, North Dakota
- Pelto, North Dakota
- Southam, North Dakota
- Rohrville, North Dakota
- Essex, North Dakota
- Devils Lake, North Dakota (also a BNSF station)

=== Gilby Subdivision ===
- Forest River, North Dakota
- Johnstown, North Dakota
- Gilby, North Dakota
- Honeyford, North Dakota

=== Mohall Subdivision ===
- Lansford, North Dakota
- Truro, North Dakota
- Mohall, North Dakota

=== Sarles Subdivision ===
- Munich, North Dakota
- Clyde, North Dakota
- Calvin, North Dakota
- Sarles, North Dakota
