= Minnesota Northern Railroad =

Class III shortline railroad in northwestern Minnesota, United States

Overview
- Headquarters: Crookston, Minnesota
- Reporting mark: MNN
- Locale: Northwest Minnesota
- Dates of operation: 1996–present

Technical
- Track gauge: 4 ft 8 1/2 in (1,435 mm) standard gauge

The Minnesota Northern Railroad (reporting mark MNN) is a Class III shortline railroad that operates over 224 miles (360 km) of track in northwestern Minnesota. The railroad is co-owned by KBN Incorporated and Independent Locomotive Service and is headquartered in Crookston, Minnesota.

As of 2006, the Minnesota Northern Railroad employed 11 people and handled approximately 11,000 carloads per year. The primary commodities hauled include grain, seeds, sugar and sugar by-products, animal feeds, and fertilizers.

The Minnesota Northern Railroad interchanges with the BNSF Railway, the Canadian Pacific Railway, and the Northern Plains Railroad.

== History ==
The Minnesota Northern Railroad was created in December 1996 when the railroad’s former owner, RailAmerica, purchased 204 miles (328 km) of track from the newly created Burlington Northern & Santa Fe Railway. Also included in the sale were 64 miles (103 km) of trackage rights on the BNSF's Grand Forks Subdivision from Crookston, Minnesota to Erskine, Minnesota and the Canadian Pacific's Detroit Lakes Subdivision from Erskine, Minnesota to Thief River Falls, Minnesota.

The 204 miles (328 km) of track initially sold to the Minnesota Northern Railroad consisted of:

- A 45-mile (72 km) portion of the P Line Subdivision from Perley, Minnesota to Crookston, Minnesota
- The 23-mile (37 km) Fertile Subdivision from Crookston, Minnesota to Fertile, Minnesota
- The 32-mile (51 km) Ada Subdivision from Crookston, Minnesota to Ada, Minnesota
- The 92-mile (148 km) Warroad Subdivision from St. Hilaire, Minnesota to Warroad, Minnesota
- A 12-mile (19 km) spur of the Grand Forks Subdivision from Tilden Junction, Minnesota to Red Lake Falls, Minnesota.

Shortly after the Minnesota Northern Railroad acquired its track, it abandoned the dilapidated Fertile Subdivision and most of the spur from Tilden Junction to Red Lake Falls. In addition, it acquired approximately 2 miles (3.2 km) of trackage rights over the BNSF Railway near Erskine, Minnesota. Later abandonments would include the portion of the Ada Subdivision from Beltrami, Minnesota to Ada, Minnesota, the portion of the P Line Subdivision from Shelly, Minnesota to Perley, Minnesota, and the portion of the Warroad Subdivision from Roseau, Minnesota to Warroad, Minnesota.

Prior to coming under the control of the Burlington Northern Santa Fe Railway, the 204 miles (328 km) of track initially purchased by the Minnesota Northern Railroad belonged to the Burlington Northern Railroad. Before being owned by the Burlington Northern Railroad, the P Line, Ada, and Warroad Subdivisions were owned by the Great Northern Railway. The Fertile Subdivision and spur from Tilden Junction to Red Lake Falls, meanwhile, had been owned by the Northern Pacific Railway.

The portion of the Fertile Subdivision sold to the Minnesota Northern Railroad was once a part of the Northern Pacific Railway’s 250-mile (400 km) mainline from Hawley, Minnesota to Winnipeg, Manitoba. Though the line was an important route for passenger and freight trains to and from Winnipeg in its heyday, currently only a few portions have been spared from abandonment. A segment of the abandoned grade between Crookston, Minnesota in the north and Ulen, Minnesota in the south has been converted to a multi-use trail known as the Agassiz Recreational Trail

Ownership of the Minnesota Northern Railroad was turned over from RailAmerica to KBN Incorporated and Independent Locomotive Service in 2001. Both companies are based in Minnesota and also co-own two other short line railroads: the St. Croix Valley Railroad (reporting mark SCXY) in eastern Minnesota and the Dakota Northern Railroad (reporting mark DN) in eastern North Dakota.

== Locomotive and Freight Car Fleet ==
Minnesota Northern Railroad co-owner Independent Locomotive Service supplies the railroad with a fleet of various locomotives, primarily rebuilt four-axle "general purpose" locomotives and switchers from EMD. The locomotives are sent from an Independent Locomotive Service shop in either Bethel, Minnesota or Holt, Minnesota.

The majority of the Minnesota Northern Railroad’s locomotives contain maroon paint with gold lettering. The colors are reminiscent of the school colors used at the University of Minnesota.

Besides possessing locomotives, the Minnesota Northern Railroad also leases 80 covered hoppers. All other freight cars used on the railroad are supplied by both the BNSF and Canadian Pacific railways.

== Stations on the Minnesota Northern Railroad ==
The Minnesota Northern Railroad owns track that goes through the following communities:

- Badger, Minnesota
- Beltrami, Minnesota
- Climax, Minnesota
- Crookston, Minnesota (Also a BNSF Railway station)
- Dakota Junction, Minnesota
- Eldred, Minnesota
- Fox, Minnesota
- Greenbush, Minnesota
- Greenview, Minnesota
- Girard, Minnesota
- Holt, Minnesota
- Mandus, Minnesota
- Middle River, Minnesota
- Nielsville, Minnesota
- Roseau, Minnesota
- St. Hilaire, Minnesota
- Shelly, Minnesota
- Strata, Minnesota
- Strathcona, Minnesota
- Thief River Falls, Minnesota (Also a Canadian Pacific Railway and Northern Plains Railroad station)
- Tilden Junction, Minnesota (Also a BNSF Railway station)
- Wilds, Minnesota
