= Lansford =

Lansford may refer to:

- Lansford, Pennsylvania
- Lansford, North Dakota
