= St. Croix Valley Railroad =

Railway line in Minnesota, United States

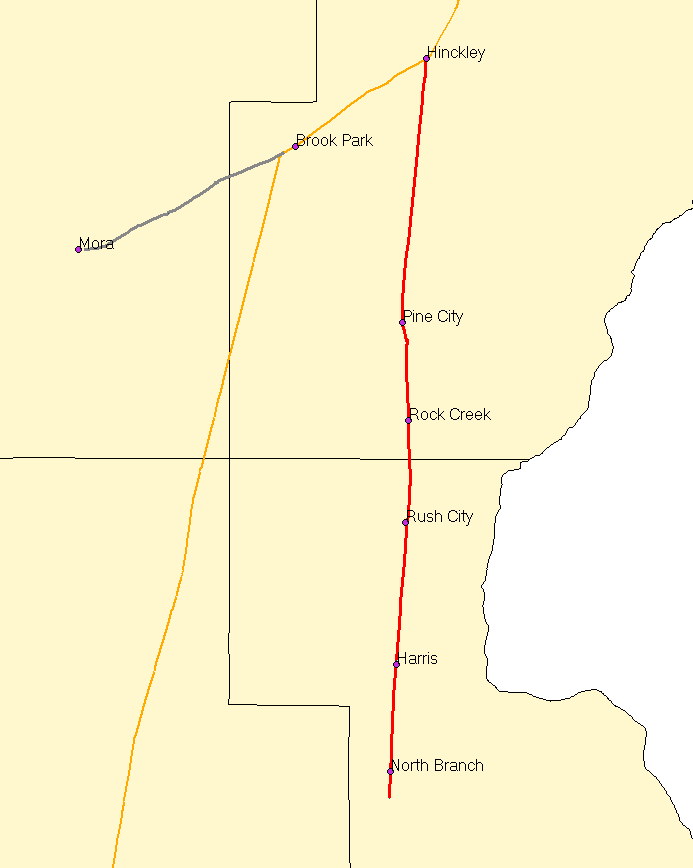
- Route map of the St. Croix Valley Railroad. Red line is current trackage; orange lines are BNSF Railway trackage; gray line is abandoned SCXY trackage

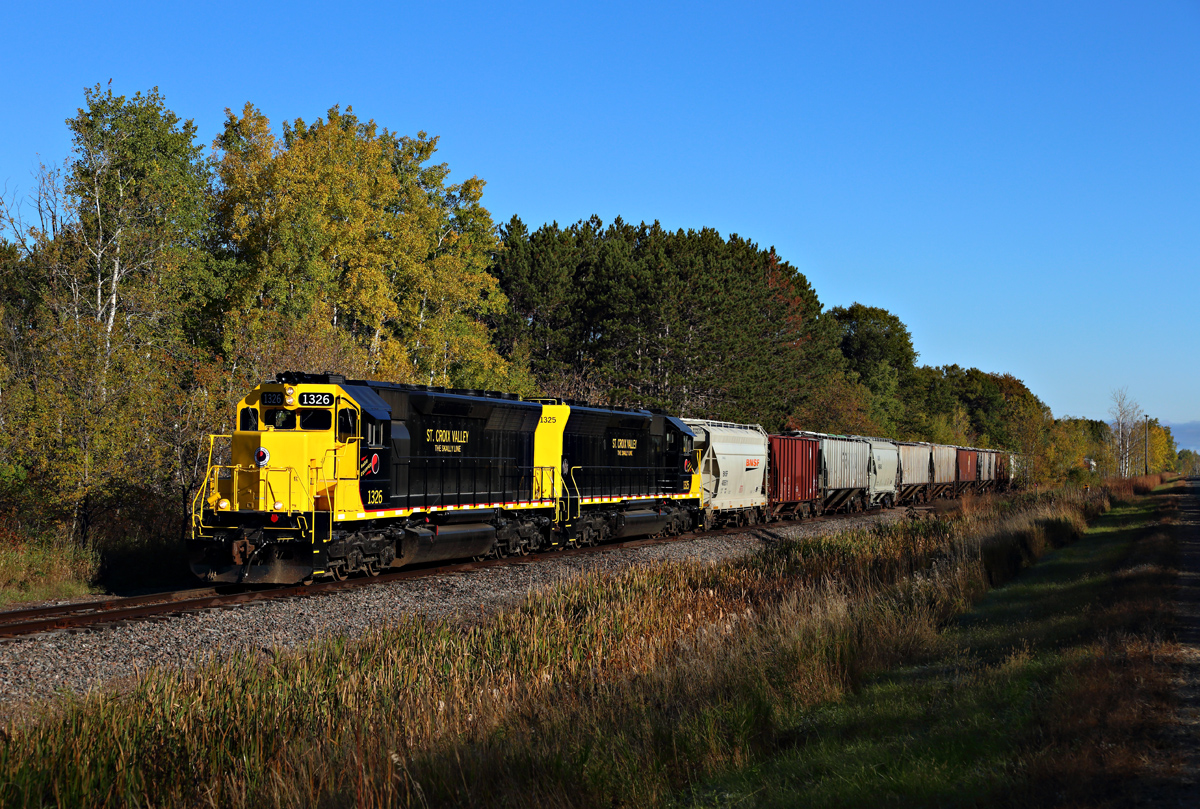
- Two rebuilt EMD SD40M-2s pull a freight train in 2014

Overview
- Headquarters: Rush City, Minnesota
- Reporting mark: SCXY
- Locale: Eastern Minnesota
- Dates of operation: 1997–

The St. Croix Valley Railroad (reporting mark SCXY) is a Class III short line railroad that operates over 36 miles (58 kilometres) of track in eastern Minnesota. The railroad is owned by KBN Incorporated jointly between Independent Locomotive Service of Bethel MN and Midwest Locomotive Services of Atwater MN, with the railroad headquartered in Rush City, Minnesota.

As of 2008, the St. Croix Valley Railroad handled approximately 3,700 carloads per year. The primary commodities hauled included, chemicals, grain, flour, sand and fertilizers. As of 2014, The St. Croix Valley handled Approximately 16,000 car loads.

The St. Croix Valley Railroad interchanges with the BNSF Railway in Hinckley, Minnesota.

== History ==
The St. Croix Valley Railroad was created in September 1997 when the railroad's former owner, RailAmerica Incorporated, purchased two segments of track in eastern Minnesota from the BNSF Railway. Also included in the sale were 8 miles (13 kilometers) of trackage rights on the BNSF Hinckley Subdivision between Hinckley, Minnesota and Brook Park, Minnesota.

The two segments of track initially acquired by the St. Croix Valley Railroad included the 36 miles (58 kilometers) Amber Subdivision between Hinckley, Minnesota and North Branch, Minnesota and an 11-mile (18-kilometer) spur of the Hinckley Subdivision between Brook Park, Minnesota and Mora, Minnesota.

Before the BNSF Railway gained ownership of the portion of the Amber Subdivision subsequently sold to the St. Croix Valley Railroad, the line was owned by the Burlington Northern Railroad. Before that, it was owned by the Northern Pacific Railway and formed that railroad's so-called "Skally Line" from St. Paul, Minnesota to Duluth, Minnesota. This line was originally built as the Lake Superior and Mississippi Railroad, later the St. Paul and Duluth Railroad. The Great Northern Railway, however, also had tracks that followed roughly the same route. When both the Great Northern Railway and the Northern Pacific Railway merged to form the Burlington Northern Railroad in 1970, the "Skally Line" became redundant and portions of it slowly became abandoned. Along with the segment operated by the St. Croix Valley Railroad, the only other portions that remain today are small pieces near St. Paul, Minnesota (currently operated by the Minnesota Commercial Railway) and Duluth, Minnesota (currently operated by the BNSF Railway). The abandoned portions of the route have been converted to rail trails: the Willard Munger State Trail (also known as Hinckley Fire Trail) between Hinckley and Duluth, and the Hardwood Creek Trail and Sunrise Prairie Trail between North Branch and Hugo.

The 11 miles (18 kilometers) spur sold by the BNSF Railway to the St. Croix Valley Railroad was also formerly owned by the Burlington Northern Railroad. Before that, it was owned by the Great Northern Railway and formed a line that went from Brook Park, Minnesota to St. Cloud, Minnesota.

In March 2003, unsafe track conditions that led to an embargo on all traffic caused the St. Croix Valley Railroad to abandon its line from Brook Park to Mora. The St. Croix Valley still retains its trackage rights to Brook Park MN.

Ownership of the St. Croix Valley Railroad was turned over from Railamerica Incorporated to KBN Incorporated named for Tom Kotnour, Norman (Pete) Bierwerth of Midwest Locomotive Inc. and Frank Nesbit of Independent Locomotive Service, jointly owning KBN, in 2001. Both companies are based in Minnesota with KBN owning two other short line railroads: the Minnesota Northern Railroad (reporting mark MNN) in northwestern Minnesota and the Dakota Northern Railroad (reporting mark DN) in eastern North Dakota.

Deterioration of the Snake River bridge crossing in Pine City caused a disruption to the line in 2009 but it was reconstructed.

== Locomotive and Freight Car Fleet ==
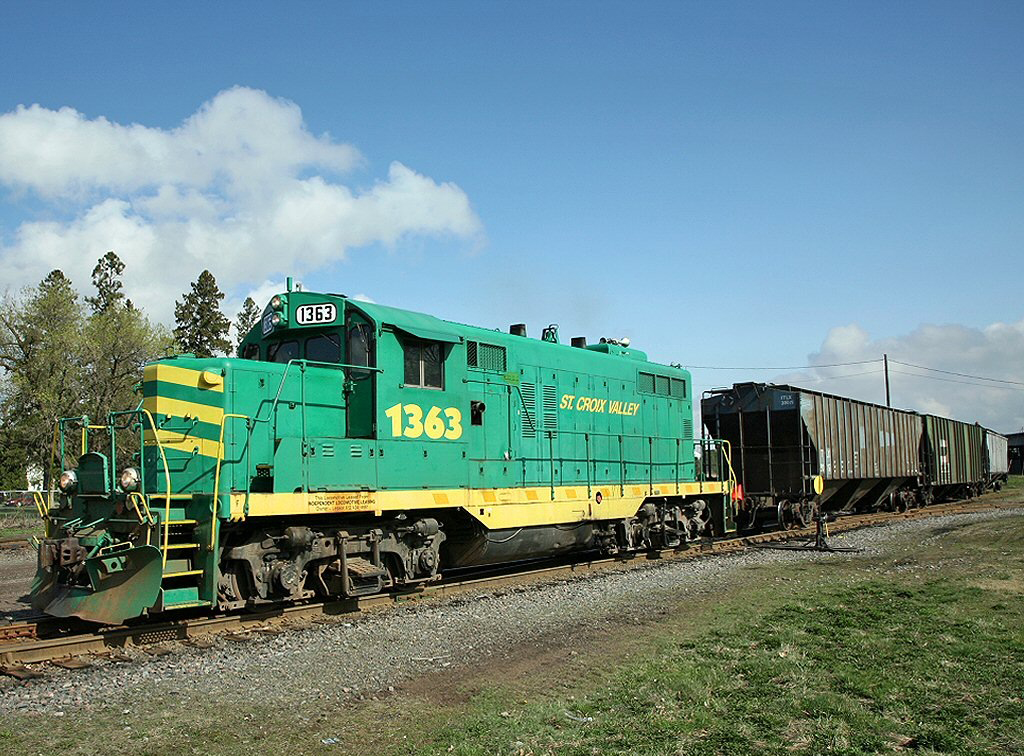
SCXY 1363

St. Croix Valley Railroad owns locomotive EMD GP9 lettered SCXY 1363. The SCXY 1363 is now black with a yellow cab face and side trim (separated by a red stripe), recalling the Northern Pacific Railway paint scheme commonly found on later NPRY diesels (shortly before the 1970 BN merger). The words "St. Croix Valley" are visible on the long hood. The paint scheme was previously green with yellow striping. SCXY 1352, an EMD GP8, is also painted in the same fashion as SCXY 1363. In 2014 in the line added two SD40M-2's (SD45 bodies). SCXY 1326 and then SCXY 1325 were acquired to help with additional traffic. Both engines were painted into the SCXY paint scheme by the WSOR paint shops in Horicon Wisconsin. As of 2022 SCXY 1352 has been scrapped at ILSX in Bethel MN due to generator issues.

== Stations on the St. Croix Valley Railroad ==
The St. Croix Valley Railroad owns track that goes through the following communities:

- Beroun, Minnesota
- Harris, Minnesota
- Hinckley, Minnesota (also a BNSF station)
- North Branch, Minnesota
- Pine City, Minnesota
- Rock Creek, Minnesota
- Rush City, Minnesota

== Sources ==
- Eisenberg, Alan (2005). "BNSF Track Segment Listings". BNSF History Project & Annual Review (9th ed.). Portland, Oregon: HAE Enterprises.
- Minnesota Regional Railroad Association (12 July 2005). "Information on Minnesota Railroads" (PDF). Archived from the original (PDF) on 28 September 2007.
- Hofsommer, Don L. (2005). Minneapolis and the Age of Railways. Minneapolis, MN: University of Minnesota Press. ISBN 0-8166-4501-9.
