= Andover Township =

Andover Township may refer to:

- Andover Township, Henry County, Illinois
- Andover Township, Minnesota
- Andover Township, New Jersey
- Andover Township, Ashtabula County, Ohio
