= Dakota Northern Railroad =

Overview
- Headquarters: Crookston, Minnesota
- Reporting mark: DN
- Locale: Northeastern North Dakota
- Dates of operation: 2006–present

Technical
- Track gauge: 4 ft 8 1/2 in (1,435 mm) standard gauge

The Dakota Northern Railroad (reporting mark DN) is a Class III short line railroad that operates over 72 miles (116 kilometres) of track in the northeastern portion of the U.S. state of North Dakota. The Dakota Northern Railroad, headquartered in Crookston, Minnesota, is co-owned by KBN Incorporated and Independent Locomotive Service.

As of 2006, the Dakota Northern Railroad employed 6 people. The primary commodities hauled included grain, coal, potato, fertilizers, and ethanol.

The railroad interchanges with the BNSF Railway in Grafton, North Dakota.

== History ==
The Dakota Northern Railroad was created in January 2006 after the BNSF Railway decided to lease approximately 72 miles (116 kilometres) of branch line trackage to KBN Incorporated and Independent Locomotive Service for an initial 10-year period.

The track leased to the Dakota Northern Railroad consists of an approximate 23 miles (37 kilometres) segment of the Glasston Subdivision between Grafton, North Dakota and Glasston, North Dakota as well as the approximate 49 miles (79 kilometres) Walhalla Subdivision between Grafton, North Dakota and Walhalla, North Dakota.

The piece of the Glasston Subdivision leased to the Dakota Northern Railroad is part of a segment of track that was once owned by the Great Northern Railway and extended from Grand Forks, North Dakota to Gretna, Manitoba. The Burlington Northern Railroad (a successor to the Great Northern Railway) abandoned the track to its current terminus of Glasston in 1993.

The Walhalla Subdivision was also once owned by the Great Northern Railway. The line extended from Grafton, North Dakota to Morden, Manitoba in the early 20th century, but was abandoned to the current terminus of Walhalla in 1936.

In 2009, Dakota Northern filed to discontinue service on 18.1 miles of the Glasston Subdivision, from a point about 2.7 miles north of Grafton to Glasston. In its filing, DN stated that the line was embargoed on March 18, 2009, because of an unsafe bridge just south of St. Thomas. It also claimed that the line is unprofitable and that traffic has been low consisting of 55 carloads in 2006, 72 carloads in 2007, 44 carloads in 2008, and 3 carloads in 2009 (January 1, 2009 to March 18, 2009). Approval to discontinue service on the line was received from the Surface Transportation Board on January 22, 2010. The line north of the embargoed bridge has been pulled up and the remaining approximate 3 miles is used for railcar storage.

== Locomotive and Freight Car Fleet ==
Dakota Northern Railroad co-owner Independent Locomotive Service supplies the railroad with two locomotives: an EMD GP10 lettered ILSX 1391, and another EMD GP10 lettered ILSX 1392. The GP10 locomotives feature the words "Independent Locomotive Service" on the long hood.

The locomotives have maroon paint with gold lettering. These colors also appear on the majority of locomotives operating on the Minnesota Northern Railroad, which is itself co-owned by the same two companies that co-own the Dakota Northern Railroad.

The railroad does not directly own or lease any freight cars. Instead, all of the freight cars it uses are provided by the BNSF Railway.

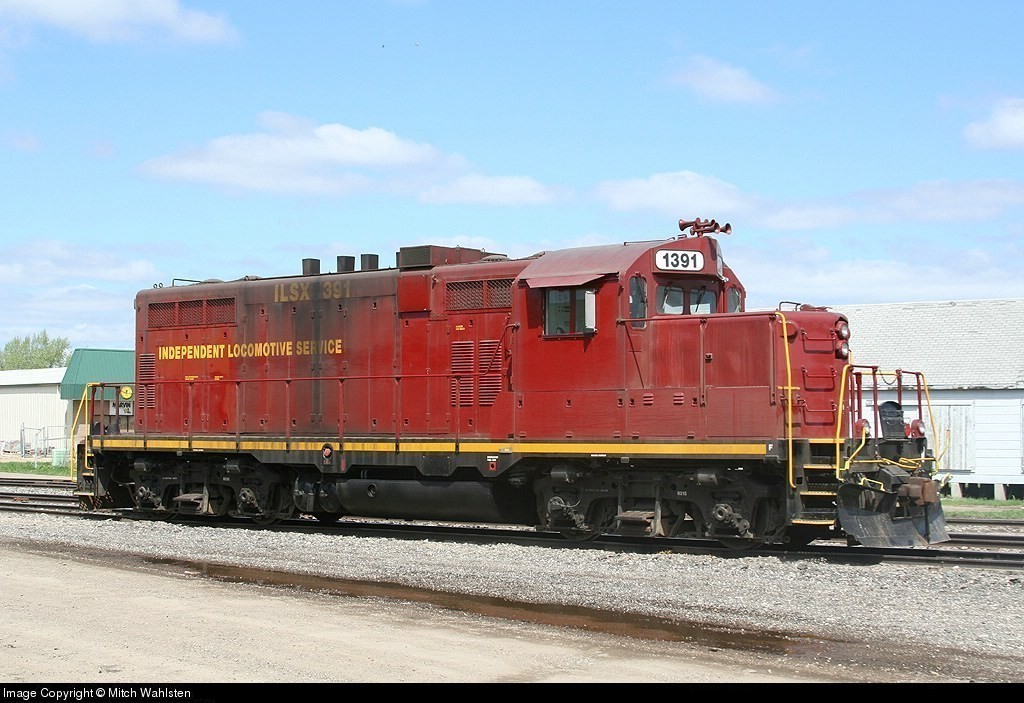
ILSX 1391

== Stations on the Dakota Northern Railroad ==
The Dakota Northern Railroad operates on track that goes through the following communities:

- Auburn, North Dakota
- Backoo, North Dakota
- Cavalier, North Dakota
- Crystal, North Dakota
- Glasston, North Dakota
- Grafton, North Dakota (also a BNSF station)
- Hensel, North Dakota
- Hoople, North Dakota
- Leyden, North Dakota
- Nash, North Dakota
- St. Thomas, North Dakota
- Walhalla, North Dakota
