= Renville County Courthouse =

- U.S. National Register of Historic Places
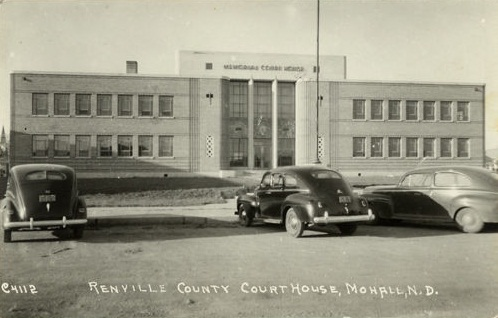
- Renville County Courthouse, c. 1940

- Location within North Dakota Location within the United States
- Location: 205 Main Street East, Mohall, North Dakota
- Coordinates: 48°45′49″N 101°30′32″W
- Area: less than one acre
- Built: 1936
- Built by: Orheim, Iver
- Architect: Molander, E. W.
- Engineer: C. H. Ording
- Architectural style: Moderne
- MPS: North Dakota County Courthouses TR
- NRHP reference No.: 85002989
- Added to NRHP: November 25, 1985

The Renville County Courthouse in Mohall, North Dakota was built from 1936 to 1937 and dedicated in June 1937. The building was designed in the Moderne style by architect E. W. Molander. The construction was partially funded by the Works Progress Administration and overseen by general contractor Iver Orheim. It was listed on the National Register of Historic Places in 1985.

The front facade is made of brick with Kettle River sandstone on the parapet. The name "Memorial Court House" is engraved in a frieze above the front entrance. Of nine county courthouses built in North Dakota during 1929–1940, it is the one having Moderne rather than Art Deco styling.
