= Forest River State Bank =

- U.S. National Register of Historic Places
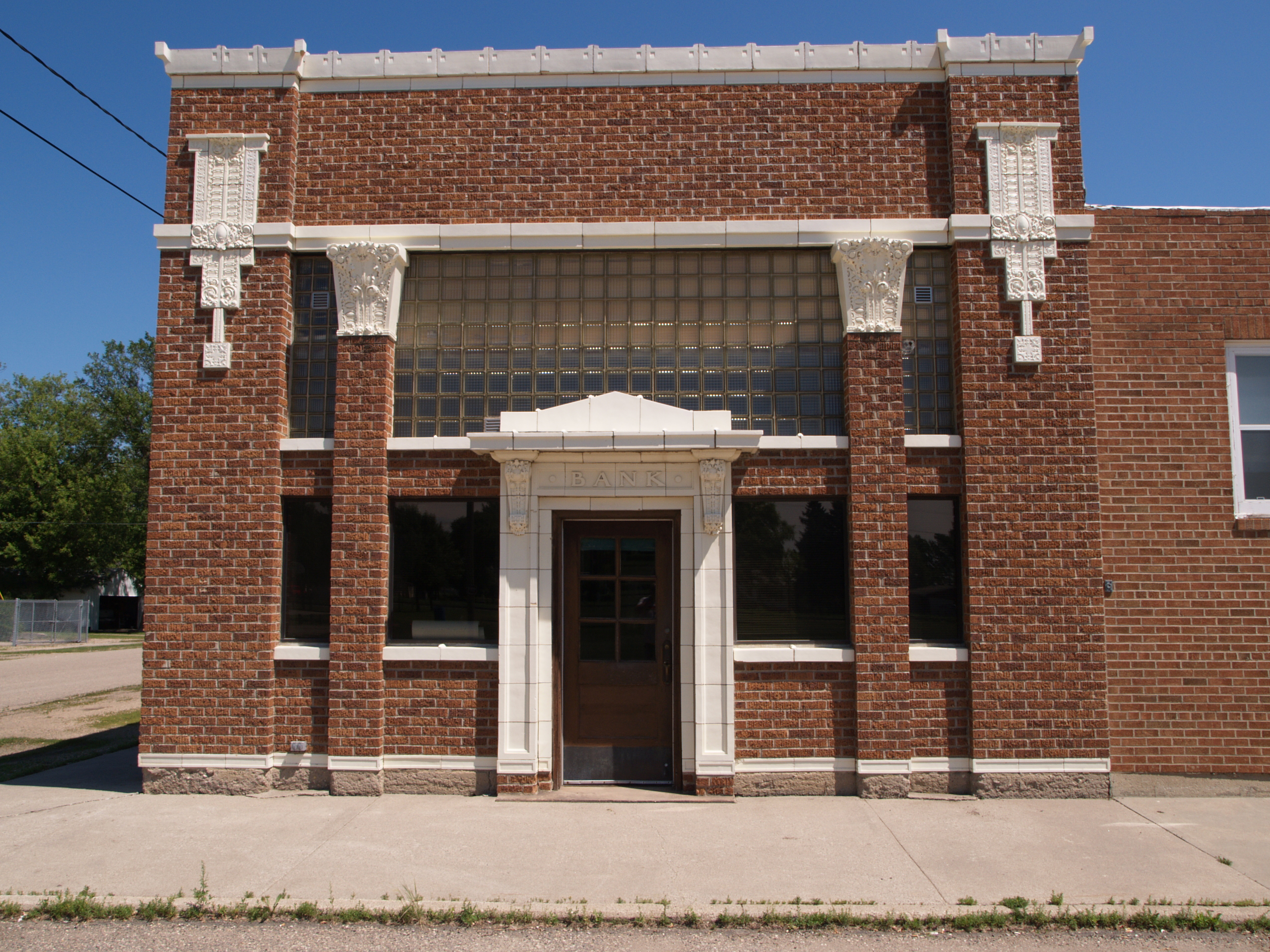
- Photo in 2005

- Location within North Dakota Location within the United States
- Location: 110 Front St., Forest River, North Dakota
- Coordinates: 48.213775°N 97.468747°W
- NRHP reference No.: 100004715
- Added to NRHP: December 5, 2019

The Forest River State Bank, at 110 Front Street in Forest River, Walsh County, North Dakota, was listed on the National Register of Historic Places in 2019.

It is a one-story brick building.
