= Mohall Lansford Sherwood School District =

School district in North Dakota, United States

The Mohall-Lansford-Sherwood (MLS) School District is a system of publicly funded schools serving the cities of Mohall, Lansford, and Sherwood, and the surrounding rural areas. It is in North Dakota region 6, district 12. There are two K-12 schools (one in Mohall and the other in Sherwood), with district administration offices in Mohall.

== Schools ==
- Mohall Public School
- Sherwood Public School
