= Honeyford, North Dakota =

- Unincorporated community
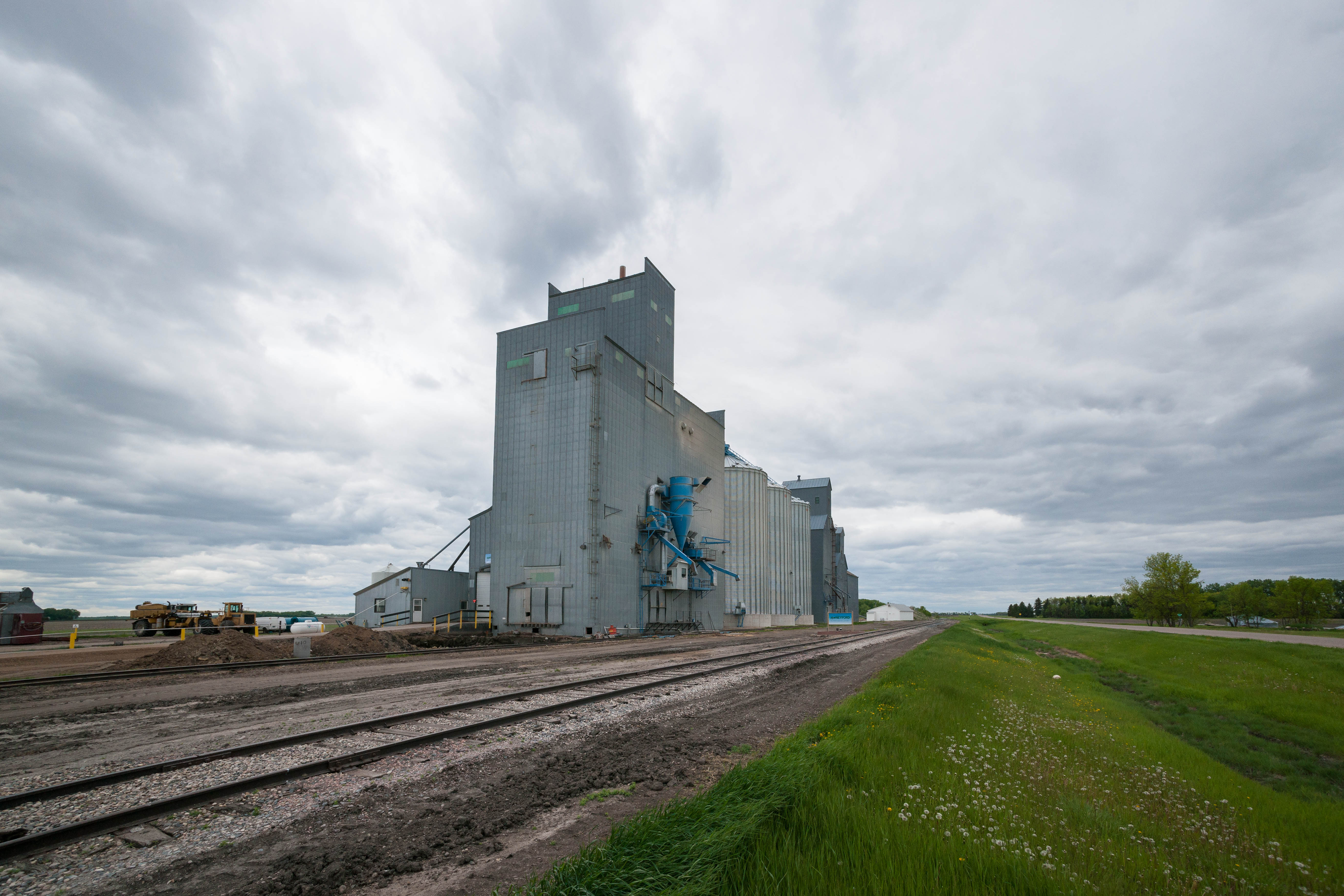
- A grain elevator in Honeyford

- Location within North Dakota
- Coordinates: 48°1′59.9″N 97°28′14″W
- Country: United States
- State: North Dakota
- County: Grand Forks
- Township: Gilby
- Founded: 1887
- Named for: William J. Honeyford
- Elevation: 896 ft (273 m)
- Time zone: UTC-6 (Central (CST))
  - Summer (DST): UTC-5 (CDT)
- ZIP code: 58235 (Gilby)
- Area code: 701
- GNIS feature ID: 1029521

Honeyford is an unincorporated community in northern Grand Forks County, North Dakota, United States. It lies approximately 21 miles (34 km) northwest of the city of Grand Forks. Honeyford's elevation is 896 feet (273 m).

== History ==
Honeyford began in 1887, as a Northern Pacific Railway station named "Bean", after S.S. Bean, who owned the land along the right-of-way. A post office bearing the Bean name was opened on March 29, 1888. Samuel White was postmaster until the office's closure on April 27, 1891. Mail was routed through nearby township Gilby until July 25, 1891, when a new post office opened with the name Honeyford, named after new postmaster William J. Honeyford. The train station was renamed Honeyford to match the post office, and the name has been in use ever since. At the towns peak it had roughly 40 residents, and at one point several shops, four elevators, a school, and a tavern.

== Today ==
Today, most of the businesses in town have closed or moved to Gilby. On the morning of October 11, 2011, the last house in Honeyford caught fire. While no one was injured, the house was deemed a "total loss" due to the extent of the damage caused. With the loss of this house, the elevator along the Northern Plains Railroad became the last structure in town. On November 1, 2021, the elevator loaded the longest unit train in U.S. history, measuring in at 1.6 miles long.
