= Holt, Minnesota =

City in Minnesota, United States

- City
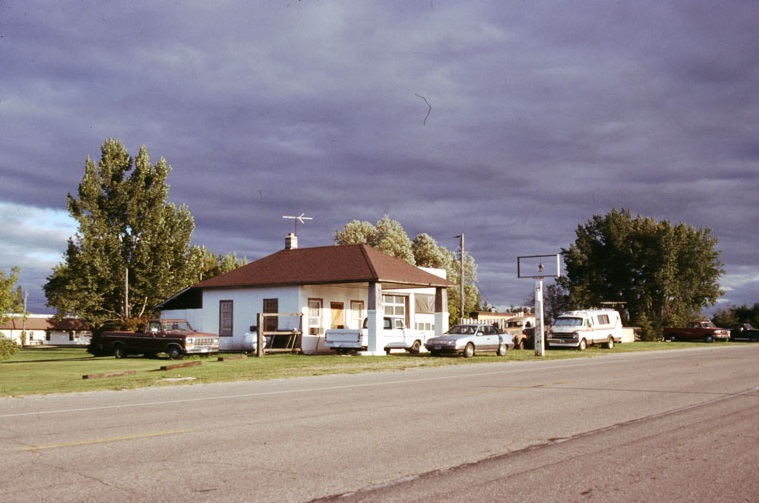
- Service station in Holt

- Location of Holt, Minnesota
- Coordinates: 48°17′32″N 96°11′39″W
- Country: United States
- State: Minnesota
- County: Marshall
- Incorporated: March 16, 1915

Government
  - Mayor: Chris Rux

Area
  - Total: 1.002 sq mi (2.595 km^{2})
  - Land: 1.002 sq mi (2.595 km^{2})
  - Water: 0 sq mi (0.000 km^{2})
- Elevation: 1,155 ft (352 m)

Population (2020)
  - Total: 90
  - Estimate (2022): 88
  - Density: 89.8/sq mi (34.68/km^{2})
- Time zone: UTC−6 (Central (CST))
  - Summer (DST): UTC−5 (CDT)
- ZIP Code: 56738
- Area code: 218
- FIPS code: 27-29870
- GNIS feature ID: 0645106
- Sales tax: 6.875%

Holt is a city in Marshall County, Minnesota, United States. The population was 90 at the 2020 census.

== Geography ==
According to the United States Census Bureau, the city has a total area of 1.002 square miles (2.60 km^{2}), all land.

== Demographics ==
Historical population
Census	Pop.	Note	%±
1920	232		—
1930	193		−16.8%
1940	209		8.3%
1950	172		−17.7%
1960	114		−33.7%
1970	97		−14.9%
1980	119		22.7%
1990	88		−26.1%
2000	89		1.1%
2010	88		−1.1%
2020	90		2.3%
2022 (est.)	88		−2.2%
U.S. Decennial Census; 2020 Census

=== 2010 census ===
As of the 2010 census, there were 88 people, 36 households, and 25 families living in the village. The population density was 87.1 inhabitants per square mile (33.6/km^{2}). There were 38 housing units at an average density of 37.6 per square mile (14.5/km^{2}). The racial makeup of the village was 93.2% White, 1.1% African American, 4.5% Native American, and 1.1% from two or more races. Hispanic or Latino of any race were 1.1% of the population.

There were 36 households, of which 33.3% had children under the age of 18 living with them, 61.1% were married couples living together, 5.6% had a female householder with no husband present, 2.8% had a male householder with no wife present, and 30.6% were non-families. 25.0% of all households were made up of individuals, and 11.1% had someone living alone who was 65 years of age or older. The average household size was 2.44 and the average family size was 3.00.

The median age in the village was 37.7 years. 27.3% of residents were under the age of 18; 1.1% were between the ages of 18 and 24; 31.9% were from 25 to 44; 28.4% were from 45 to 64; and 11.4% were 65 years of age or older. The gender makeup of the city was 53.4% male and 46.6% female.

=== 2000 census ===
As of the 2000 census, there were 89 people, 36 households, and 25 families living in the village. The population density was 88.2 inhabitants per square mile (34.1/km^{2}). There were 41 housing units at an average density of 40.6 per square mile (15.7/km^{2}). The racial makeup of the village was 97.75% White, 1.12% Native American and 1.12% Asian.

There were 36 households, out of which 27.8% had children under the age of 18 living with them, 72.2% were married couples living together, and 27.8% were non-families. 22.2% of all households were made up of individuals, and 2.8% had someone living alone who was 65 years of age or older. The average household size was 2.47 and the average family size was 2.92.

In the village, the population was spread out, with 16.9% under the age of 18, 21.3% from 18 to 24, 33.7% from 25 to 44, 20.2% from 45 to 64, and 7.9% who were 65 years of age or older. The median age was 34 years. For every 100 females, there were 140.5 males. For every 100 females age 18 and over, there were 146.7 males.

The median income for a household in the village was $32,500, and the median income for a family was $36,250. Males had a median income of $22,188 versus $16,250 for females. The per capita income for the village was $14,796. There were 13.0% of families and 8.8% of the population living below the poverty line, including no under eighteens and 50.0% of those over 64.
