= Glasston, North Dakota =

Human settlement in North Dakota, United States of America

Coordinates: 48°42′21″N 97°26′51″W

Glasston is a farming town located in St. Thomas Township in North Dakota's Pembina County, United States. It consists of a post office, a general store, and a handful of houses. It was established in 1886 as a station along the Great Northern Railroad. Originally called Baltimore, the site was later renamed for Archibald Glass, its first postmaster. The population of the village has rarely exceeded 100 since it was established.

Glasston is located on the west side of US HIghway 81 and by the eastbound of Pembina County Rd 3, approximately midway between Hamilton and Saint Thomas. Even though it is unincorporated, it has a post office with the ZIP code 58236.

== History ==
In 1879, Mr. Ike Foster and a friend travelled south from Pembina to the present location of Bowesmont and then west to where Glasston is now. They were looking for land to homestead as so many others were doing. They finally settled near Bathgate, North Dakota, the home of Norval Baptie, the famous skater. Also, home of later Governor Walter Welford of Pembina County. In 1879 this area was very remote, with few settlers and no roads.

In 1880 and 1881 an abundance of settlers arrived in this area, many from St Vincent Minnesota, until all the homesteads were taken.

In 1882 the Littlejohn family homesteaded in Glasston. They came from Fort Pembina, where they had lived for a short time after arriving from Canada. Some of the family members were employed at Fort Penbina. The Haezlett family had arrived in 1880.

In 1882, the first railroad came to Glasston. At this time there were no permanent buildings and the grading crew for the railroad camped on the Glasston site.

In 1883 Mr. Edward Sing established the first US Post office, located halfway between Hamilton and St Thomas, and named it Baltimore. He constructed a small building and planned on operating the post office with a real estate business. However, Mr. Sing was in poor health and died later that same year. After Mr. Sings death his widow, Catherine A Sing, was appointed post mistress and held this position for several years. This small building was a short distance east of the railroad. Glasston was just a flag station on the railroad so if there were no passengers in sight, the train just slowed down for a mail sack exchange. It was the chore of some member of the family to carry out the mail sack and throw it into the moving mail car and receive the incoming mail. This daily ritual went on for some time until the railroad built a platform quite some distance south of the original place. There was some question concerning compensation so the mail sack was carried out to the original place. But the train flew by at full speed making it impossible to throw in the sack. However the mail clerk, a kind man, continued to throw off the mail sacks from the train when he saw someone waiting. The railroad company finally agreed to pay for having the mail delivered to the platform.

During 1882 and 1883 church services were held at the home of Thomas Armstrong and later in the school house. The early pastors came from towns close by. Mr. Williams, a Presbyterian minister, came from Bathgate. Dr. Crawford, a Baptist, came from St. Thomas and a Methodist minister came from Hamilton. The Methodist preached a fiery sermon on Sunday against card playing – especially against the “Old of Sinch”, which was the popular game at that time. Not being up on the game he called it “Chintz” which brought much amusement to the juniors of the congregation.

In 1881 the four MCabe brothers, James, John, George and Milton came to establish a home. They build it north and east of town. James was the only brother already married. Milton, the youngest, attended college in Beloit, Michigan. Their sisters, Mary Ann (and husband John McLellan) and Margaret (married George Glass), also joined them.

In 1884, Archibald Glass brought his family out from Ontario and established a store business. He later became postmaster. The A.A. White Townsite Company bought up the land and surveyed it into lots. They left out the old Baltimore Post Office, so the name was changed to Glasston. Mr. Leonard Dewar now owns the oldest home in Glasston.

In 1884 the Minneapolis and Northern Elevators were built and Lemuel Bennett was the first agent. In 1885 the North Western Elevator was built with James McCabe as acting agent. There were five elevators in Glasston at one time.

In 1887 the Great Northern Railway Station was built and Samuel F. Boyer was the first agent. Thomas Armstrong was the first treasurer and he held this position for forty-three years. In 1886 a new school was built and Harriette Sing was the first teacher. Later teachers were: Kate McLellan, Mattie Glass and Miss Hattie Brown - the first music teacher. The Glasston school burned in 1927 and another school was built that summer. While the new school was under construction, school was held in the Presbyterian Church. The school Board Members at this time were: George Dickie, Henry Hartje and Joe Ray. The Glasston school closed in 1960.

In 1889 the Presbyterian Church was built and in 1901 the Methodist Church was built. The Armstrongs and the Littlejohns, with many others, played an important part throughout the years. Hattie Littlejohn was one of the members who helped serve the first church supper.

Both churches had a good delegation of hard-working people. Much time and effort went into the Ladies Aids and the church suppers. In later years a popular Presbyterian minister was Reverend Frank Shellcross, who was originally from England. The Presbyterian Church closed in the fall of 1947. There were only three weddings in the Glasston Presbyterian Church: Jessie McCabe, Goldie Dickie in 1946, and Grace Ray in 1947.

The McCabe brothers established a lumber yard. J. Armstrong built a hardware store and later bought out the lumber yard. Hugh Munroe owned the first hotel and by 1899 two saloons were operating. There was also another store owned by the Dickie brothers. They later sold it to J.W. Arthur, who operated it for many years.

Two of the early day blacksmiths were Thomas Herron and Charles McGuire. Andy Robinson also owned a shop and later sold it to James McQuarters.

North of the Monroes lived Mr. and Mrs. Richmond, and elderly couple who remained just a few years. To the east were the Littlejohns, Quigleys, John Haezletts and the shoemaker, Mr. Haugen. He was the only known shoemaker around. On the north, along the railroad on the west, was John Williamson who settled here in 1879. To the south and west were the McMahons and the Isaac Jacksons. To the north and west were Thomas and Charlie Armstrong, the Stulls and the Hudsons.

Thomas Armstrong lived on his homestead just west and adjoining the “Tree Claim”. It was well known as one of the first groves of trees planted on the prairie. Thomas Armstrong was a bachelor. His two brothers, Bob and Ed, lived with him until 1886 when Thomas brought his bride out from Ontario. Further along the road was Foster Johnson and east of him was William McBride, once County Auditor of Pembina County. To the southwest were the Websters, Henry and Alva.

On the east side of the railroad track north of Glasston, after passing the old school section and ½ mile east of Magnus Johnson to the east, was Mr. Everett. He was a retired minister who settled on this quarter of land. Further east was Alex Steward and Archie Sillers. On the east was the big slough. Tom and John Fuller lived on a knoll which was often surrounded by water.

In 1906 a fire broke out in the lumber yard and most of Glasston burned. J.W Arthur built his store and three years later State Bank was built. The bank continued to operate until 1924. The first banker was L.W. Kannenberg who was married to Miss Alice Armstrong, daughter of Thomas Armstrong. As Glasston grew, the businesses of the town centered on Main Street. Mr. Parson came from Minnesota and purchased a store from Sam Littlejohn. It was known as a CO-OP Store from 1913 to 1921. Many people bought as many as 5,000 shares in this CO-OP, but it didn’t prove successful and they all suffered a loss.

The Lindermans had a store and he was also a banker. The store was sold to Andrew and Henry Norgart and later resold to Andrew Norgart’s daughter Celia, the widow of Fred Ziffler. Linderman also had the post office and for a while was in the front part of Bill Ray’s garage. The postmistress was Mrs. Lincoln Armstrong, followed by Sara Carew and finally Miss Mildred Hartje.

In 1973 Glasston has the post office, the Farmer’s Union and the GTA Elevator, which was taken over from the McCabes about 35 years earlier. James Evenson has been the manager for about the last eight years. There are two potato houses which are owned by Warren Hartje and the Briese brothers. In 1958 the Masonic Temple was moved from St Thomas to Glasston where it became the Community Hall.
