= Sherwood, North Dakota =

- City
- Location of Sherwood, North Dakota
- Coordinates: 48.961867°N 101.632802°W
- Country: United States
- State: North Dakota
- County: Renville
- Founded: 1904
- Incorporated: 1916

Government
  - Mayor: Garrett Volk

Area
  - Total: 0.316 sq mi (0.818 km^{2})
  - Land: 0.316 sq mi (0.818 km^{2})
  - Water: 0 sq mi (0.000 km^{2})
- Elevation: 1,600 ft (500 m)

Population (2020)
  - Total: 194
  - Estimate (2024): 199
  - Density: 614.3/sq mi (237.19/km^{2})
- Time zone: UTC–6 (Central (CST))
  - Summer (DST): UTC–5 (CDT)
- ZIP Code: 58782
- Area code: 701
- FIPS code: 38-72540
- GNIS feature ID: 1036261

Sherwood is a city in Renville County, North Dakota, United States. The population was 194 as of the 2020 census. It is part of the Minot Metropolitan Statistical Area. It was founded in 1904 and named after Sherwood H. Sleeper, a Mohall banker who had owned land in the area.

Sherwood's weather station has one of the lowest (if not the lowest) yearly precipitation levels in North Dakota, with an annual normal of 13.13 inches (1971–2000).

Sherwood is designated by the U.S. Customs and Border Protection agency as a port of entry between the United States and Canada.

== Geography ==
According to the United States Census Bureau, the city has a total area of 0.316 square miles (0.82 km^{2}), all land.

== Demographics ==
Historical population
Census	Pop.	Note	%±
1910	328		—
1920	423		29.0%
1930	455		7.6%
1940	390		−14.3%
1950	421		7.9%
1960	360		−14.5%
1970	369		2.5%
1980	294		−20.3%
1990	286		−2.7%
2000	255		−10.8%
2010	242		−5.1%
2020	194		−19.8%
2024 (est.)	199		2.6%
U.S. Decennial Census; 2020 Census

=== 2010 census ===
As of the 2010 census, there were 242 people, 110 households, and 70 families residing in the city. The population density was 780.6 inhabitants per square mile (301.4/km^{2}). There were 133 housing units at an average density of 429.0 per square mile (165.6/km^{2}). The racial makeup of the city was 99.2% White and 0.8% from two or more races. Hispanic or Latino of any race were 0.4% of the population.

There were 110 households, of which 31.8% had children under the age of 18 living with them, 51.8% were married couples living together, 4.5% had a female householder with no husband present, 7.3% had a male householder with no wife present, and 36.4% were non-families. 34.5% of all households were made up of individuals, and 16.4% had someone living alone who was 65 years of age or older. The average household size was 2.20 and the average family size was 2.74.

The median age in the city was 42.3 years. 26% of residents were under the age of 18; 2.5% were between the ages of 18 and 24; 25.2% were from 25 to 44; 25.3% were from 45 to 64; and 21.1% were 65 years of age or older. The gender makeup of the city was 49.6% male and 50.4% female.

=== 2000 census ===
As of the 2000 census, there were 255 people, 117 households, and 65 families residing in the city. The population density was 802.2 inhabitants per square mile (309.7/km^{2}). There were 138 housing units at an average density of 434.1 per square mile (167.6/km^{2}). The racial makeup of the city was 98.04% White, 1.18% Native American, and 0.78% from two or more races.

There were 117 households, out of which 28.2% had children under the age of 18 living with them, 47.0% were married couples living together, 5.1% had a female householder with no husband present, and 43.6% were non-families. 42.7% of all households were made up of individuals, and 24.8% had someone living alone who was 65 years of age or older. The average household size was 2.18 and the average family size was 3.08.

In the city, the population was spread out, with 27.5% under the age of 18, 4.7% from 18 to 24, 25.1% from 25 to 44, 23.1% from 45 to 64, and 19.6% who were 65 years of age or older. The median age was 41 years. For every 100 females, there were 96.2 males. For every 100 females age 18 and over, there were 96.8 males.

The median income for a household in the city was $26,442, and the median income for a family was $34,167. Males had a median income of $27,500 versus $25,625 for females. The per capita income for the city was $14,756. None of the families and 7.3% of the population were living below the poverty line, including no under eighteens and 15.7% of those over 64.

== Education ==
The Mohall, Lansford, and Sherwood school districts consolidated into the Mohall Lansford Sherwood School District in 2005. In order to minimize controversy, the three school districts' old nicknames (Yellowjackets, Cubs, and Wildcats, respectively) were retired, and voters in the newly consolidated district chose the Mavericks as the new nickname. Also, as part of the consolidation, the Sherwood high school closed its doors in 2005, and the elementary school followed suit in 2016. All students from the Sherwood area now attend school in Mohall.

== History ==
The town site of Sherwood was homesteaded by Bert C. Loomis. Loomis deeded the land to Sherwood H. Sleeper, who subsequently deeded the land to the Northern Town and Land Company or Corporation, who surveyed it into lots.

A site for a town was purchased by Sherwood H. Sleeper in the summer of 1904 on the NE quarter of Section 12, Range 85, Township 163. On August 4, 1904, the surveying and platting was begun and the town site plat was filed in Imperial Ward County on September 6, 1904. The town was named Sherwood.

The earliest post office of Colquhoun was located on the west side of the township, five miles from the present site of Sherwood, on what was the Maurice Walsh farm. This was known as the “Nina” Post Office. The late C. A. Verry of Minot was instrumental in getting the “Nina” Post Office located in Calquhoun. The postmaster at the Nina Post Office was O. H. Moon. There was also a post office in Eden Valley township called the “Bolacker” Post Office. Mrs. Alexander was the postmistress there. Later, both the Nina and Bolacker Post Offices were moved to the present site of Sherwood with Mrs. Alexander as postmistress.

Rural free delivery was established in the fall of 1904 with Fred Cool, Charlie King and Henry Hurdelbrink as mail carriers.

Sherwood was organized as a village in April 1905. The first village officers were: C.H. Ennis, Chairman; F.L. Denneson, Trustee; K.T. Roble, Trustee; W.H. Walker, Trustee; H.W. Conway, Marshal; E.O. Keene, Justice; J.G. Connole, Treasurer; and R.L. Young, Clerk.

=== Education history ===
Brother Charles Gauber started a small school called the Simon Olson Shack before the town was incorporated. The town grade school opened under Miss Lelah Conkey and Lily Traux. Members of the board were: N. Nelson, President; P.A. Conkey; Simon Olson; and T.R. McFarlane, Clerk. In 1908 a high school was added and in 1912, five teachers were employed.

In 1916, a separate high school building east of the grade school was built. The first graduation class from the high school were: Esther Stenzel, Cora Knutson, Paul Goheen, and Glenn Sansburn. The Beckedahl School was moved in and used as a classroom in 1922. Children were brought in by buses. All recreation, even basketball, was outdoors.

=== Modern history ===
On September 15, 1991, an oil fire broke out west of town. Eight firefighters responded to the scene. While they were trying to put out the fire, the wind changed direction and the men received severe injuries. Six of the men survived, but two others, Craig Keith and Kevin Johnson, would later die of their injuries. Today, a monument stands in front of the Sherwood Fire Department in memory of these two men.

In 2015, after failing to turn Leith into an all white community, Craig Cobb moved to Sherwood. Craig has expressed a desire to turn the town into a white nationalist community.
