= Kramer, North Dakota =

- City
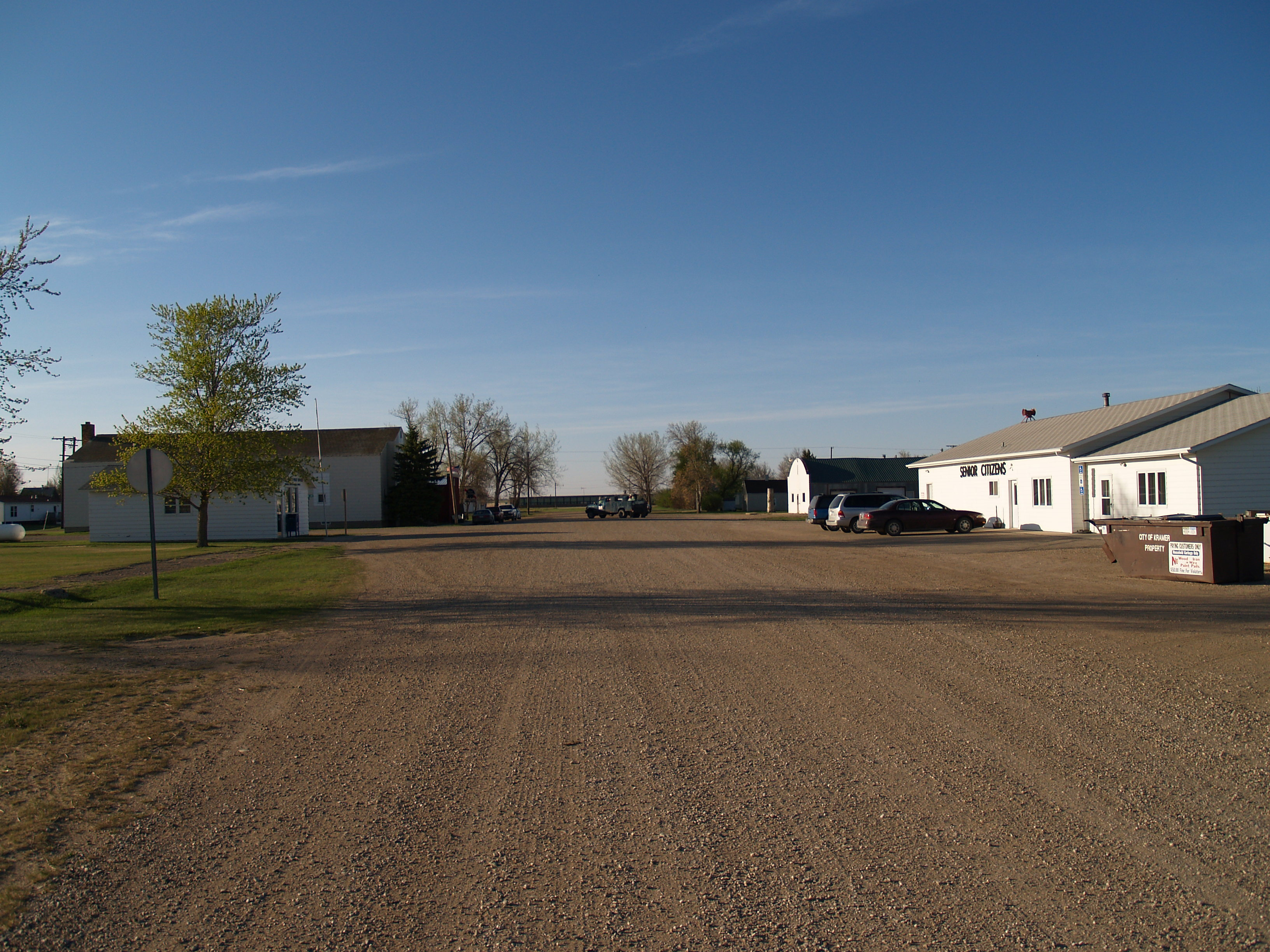
- Street in Kramer

- Location of Kramer, North Dakota
- Coordinates: 48°41′28″N 100°42′28″W
- Country: United States
- State: North Dakota
- County: Bottineau
- Founded: 1905

Area
  - Total: 0.15 sq mi (0.40 km^{2})
  - Land: 0.15 sq mi (0.40 km^{2})
  - Water: 0 sq mi (0.00 km^{2})
- Elevation: 1,457 ft (444 m)

Population (2020)
  - Total: 24
  - Estimate (2024): 24
  - Density: 156.9/sq mi (60.59/km^{2})
- Time zone: UTC–6 (Central (CST))
  - Summer (DST): UTC–5 (CDT)
- ZIP Code: 58748
- Area code: 701
- FIPS code: 38-43500
- GNIS feature ID: 1036111

Kramer is a city in Bottineau County, North Dakota, United States. The population was 24 at the 2020 census. Kramer was founded in 1905.

== Geography ==
According to the United States Census Bureau, the city has a total area of 0.15 square miles (0.39 km^{2}), all land.

== Demographics ==
Historical population
Census	Pop.	Note	%±
1910	181		—
1920	172		−5.0%
1930	190		10.5%
1940	220		15.8%
1950	198		−10.0%
1960	175		−11.6%
1970	125		−28.6%
1980	84		−32.8%
1990	51		−39.3%
2000	44		−13.7%
2010	29		−34.1%
2020	24		−17.2%
2024 (est.)	24		0.0%
U.S. Decennial Census; 2020 Census

=== 2010 census ===
As of the census of 2010, there were 29 people, 16 households, and 12 families living in the city. The population density was 193.3 inhabitants per square mile (74.6/km^{2}). There were 41 housing units at an average density of 273.3 per square mile (105.5/km^{2}). The racial makeup of the city was 100.0% White.

There were 15 households, of which 6.75% had children under the age of 21 living with them, 54.3% were married couples living together, 13.3% had a female householder with no husband present, 6.7% had a male householder with no wife present, and 26.7% were non-families. 20.0% of all households were made up of individuals, and 20% had someone living alone who was 65 years of age or older. The average household size was 1.93 and the average family size was 2.18.

The median age in the city was 65.8 years. 10.3% of residents were under the age of 18; 0% were between the ages of 18 and 24; 17.1% were from 25 to 44; 17.2% were from 45 to 64; and 55.2% were 65 years of age or older. The gender makeup of the city was 45% male and 55.5% female.

=== 2000 census ===
As of the census of 2000, there were 44 people, 23 households, and 12 families living in the city. The population density was 277.8 inhabitants per square mile (107.3/km^{2}). There were 43 housing units at an average density of 271.5 per square mile (104.8/km^{2}). The racial makeup of the city was 97.73% White and 2.27% Asian.

There were 23 households, out of which 8.7% had children under the age of 18 living with them, 52.2% were married couples living together, and 43.5% were non-families. 30.4% of all households were made up of individuals, and 21.7% had someone living alone who was 65 years of age or older. The average household size was 1.91 and the average family size was 2.23.

In the city, the population was spread out, with 6.8% under the age of 18, 4.5% from 18 to 24, 22.7% from 25 to 44, 27.3% from 45 to 64, and 38.6% who were 65 years of age or older. The median age was 58 years. For every 100 females, there were 100.0 males. For every 100 females age 18 and over, there were 105.0 males.

The median income for a household in the city was $17,292, and the median income for a family was $23,333. Males had a median income of $12,250 versus $16,875 for females. The per capita income for the city was $11,091. There were 18.8% of families and 21.1% of the population living below the poverty line, including no under eighteens and 25.9% of those over 64.
