= Forest River, North Dakota =

- City
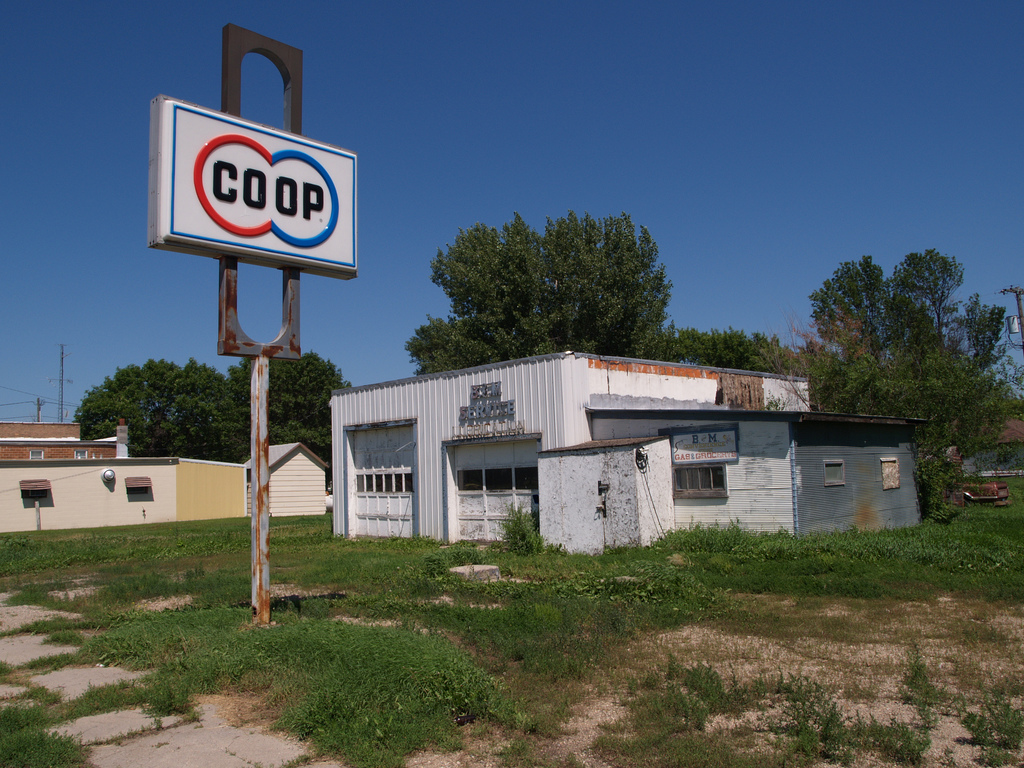
- An old gas station in Forest River

- Location of Forest River, North Dakota
- Coordinates: 48°13′00″N 97°28′13″W
- Country: United States
- State: North Dakota
- County: Walsh
- Founded: July 13, 1887

Area
  - Total: 0.50 sq mi (1.30 km^{2})
  - Land: 0.50 sq mi (1.30 km^{2})
  - Water: 0 sq mi (0.00 km^{2})
- Elevation: 863 ft (263 m)

Population (2020)
  - Total: 109
  - Estimate (2024): 111
  - Density: 217.7/sq mi (84.05/km^{2})
- Time zone: UTC–6 (Central (CST))
  - Summer (DST): UTC–5 (CDT)
- ZIP Code: 58233
- Area code: 701
- FIPS code: 38-27100
- GNIS feature ID: 1036038

Forest River is a city in Walsh County, North Dakota, United States. The population was 109 at the 2020 census. Forest River was founded on July 13, 1887.

== Geography ==
According to the United States Census Bureau, the city has a total area of 0.50 square miles (1.29 km^{2}), all land.

== Demographics ==
Historical population
| Census | Pop. | Note | %± |
|---|---|---|---|
| 1900 | 252 | | — |
| 1910 | 233 | | −7.5% |
| 1920 | 226 | | −3.0% |
| 1930 | 198 | | −12.4% |
| 1940 | 207 | | 4.5% |
| 1950 | 236 | | 14.0% |
| 1960 | 191 | | −19.1% |
| 1970 | 169 | | −11.5% |
| 1980 | 152 | | −10.1% |
| 1990 | 148 | | −2.6% |
| 2000 | 154 | | 4.1% |
| 2010 | 125 | | −18.8% |
| 2020 | 109 | | −12.8% |
| 2024 (est.) | 111 | | 1.8% |
U.S. Decennial Census; 2020 Census

=== 2010 census ===
As of the 2010 census, there were 125 people, 55 households, and 31 families living in the city. The population density was 250.0 inhabitants per square mile (96.5/km^{2}). There were 59 housing units at an average density of 118.0 per square mile (45.6/km^{2}). The racial makeup of the city was 99.2% White and 0.8% from two or more races. Hispanic or Latino of any race were 16.0% of the population.

There were 55 households, of which 20.0% had children under the age of 18 living with them, 49.1% were married couples living together, 5.5% had a female householder with no husband present, 1.8% had a male householder with no wife present, and 43.6% were non-families. 34.5% of all households were made up of individuals, and 9.1% had someone living alone who was 65 years of age or older. The average household size was 2.27 and the average family size was 3.00.

The median age in the city was 43.2 years. 20% of residents were under the age of 18; 6.4% were between the ages of 18 and 24; 26.4% were from 25 to 44; 35.2% were from 45 to 64; and 12% were 65 years of age or older. The gender makeup of the city was 53.6% male and 46.4% female.

=== 2000 census ===
As of the 2000 census, there were 154 people, 59 households, and 42 families living in the city. The population density was 305.9 inhabitants per square mile (118.1/km^{2}). There were 68 housing units at an average density of 135.1 per square mile (52.2/km^{2}). The racial makeup of the city was 99.35% White, and 0.65% from two or more races. Hispanic or Latino of any race were 11.69% of the population.

There were 59 households, out of which 32.2% had children under the age of 18 living with them, 54.2% were married couples living together, 11.9% had a female householder with no husband present, and 28.8% were non-families. 27.1% of all households were made up of individuals, and 8.5% had someone living alone who was 65 years of age or older. The average household size was 2.61 and the average family size was 3.07.

In the city, the population was spread out, with 31.2% under the age of 18, 6.5% from 18 to 24, 24.7% from 25 to 44, 23.4% from 45 to 64, and 14.3% who were 65 years of age or older. The median age was 35 years. For every 100 females, there were 81.2 males. For every 100 females age 18 and over, there were 100.0 males.

As of 2000 the median income for a household was $31,250, and the median income for a family was $30,833. Males had a median income of $33,125 versus $21,250 for females. The per capita income for the city was $14,698. About 4.8% of families and 9.7% of the population were below the poverty line, including 18.9% of those under the age of eighteen and 10.0% of those 65 or over.

== See also ==
- Forest River State Bank
