= Mohall, North Dakota =

- City
- Motto(s): Beautiful Town, Beautiful People.
- Location of Mohall, North Dakota
- Coordinates: 48°45′58″N 101°31′01″W
- Country: United States
- State: North Dakota
- County: Renville
- Founded: 1901

Government
  - Mayor: Tom Witteman

Area
  - Total: 1.07 sq mi (2.77 km^{2})
  - Land: 1.07 sq mi (2.77 km^{2})
  - Water: 0 sq mi (0.00 km^{2})
- Elevation: 1,641 ft (500 m)

Population (2020)
  - Total: 694
  - Estimate (2022): 673
  - Density: 650.0/sq mi (250.97/km^{2})
- Time zone: UTC-6 (Central (CST))
  - Summer (DST): UTC-5 (CDT)
- ZIP code: 58761
- Area code: 701
- FIPS code: 38-53780
- GNIS feature ID: 1036167
- Website: mohallndak.com

Mohall is a city in Renville County, North Dakota, United States. It is the county seat of Renville County. The population was 694 at the 2020 census. Mohall is part of the Minot Metropolitan Statistical Area.

== History ==
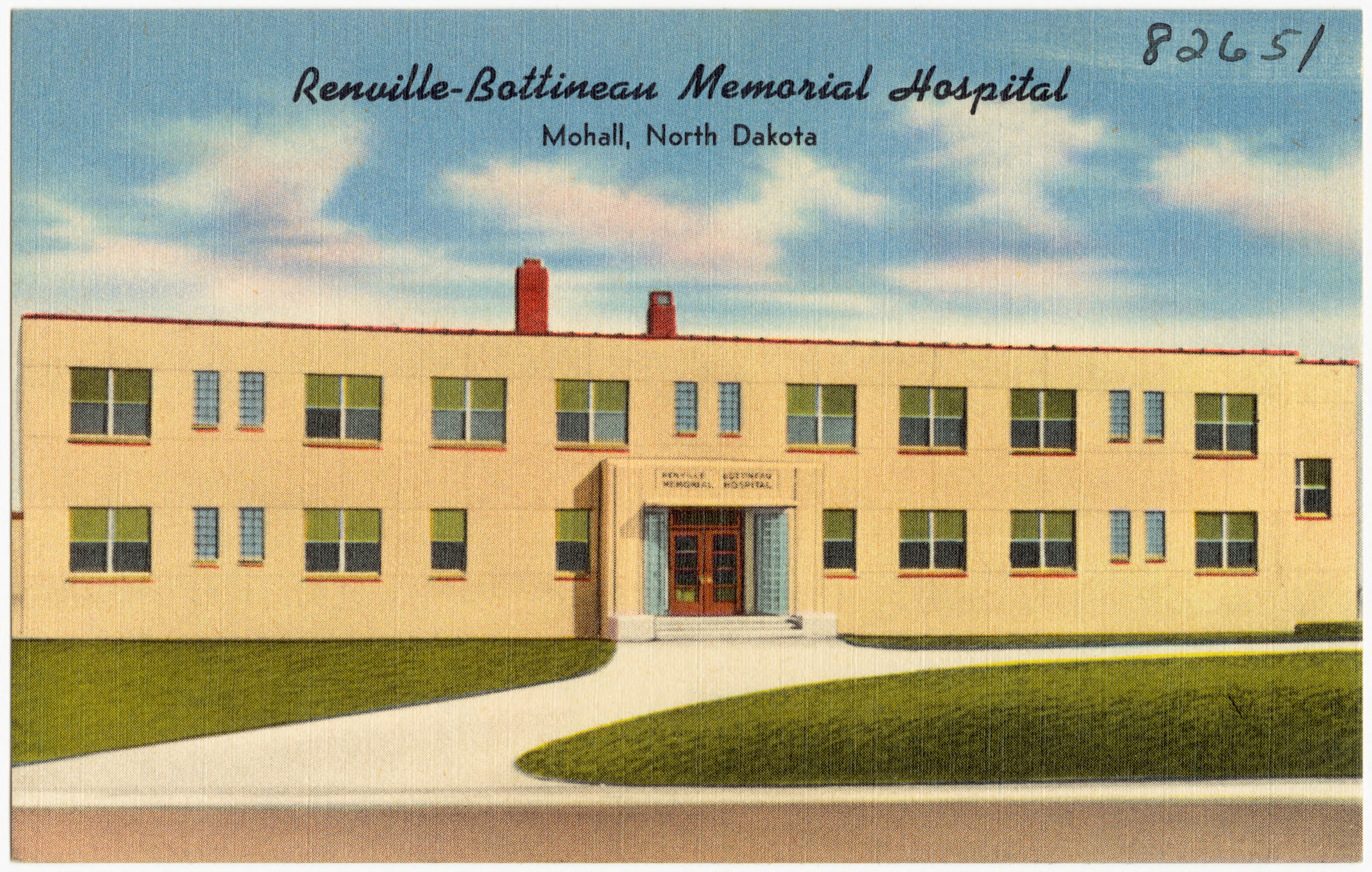
Postcard depicting Renville-Bottineau Memorial Hospital, Mohall, undated

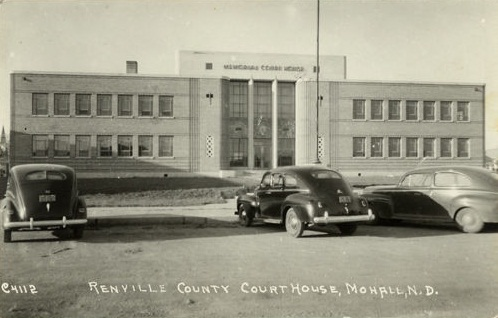
Renville County Courthouse in Mohall, undated

Mohall was founded in 1901 by M.O. Hall, a businessman from Duluth, Minnesota. The city was originally named Hall but this conflicted with another community in North Dakota with the same name, so it was changed to Mohall in 1902. In 1910, Mohall was established as the county seat for Renville County. The Renville County Courthouse opened in 1937.

== Geography ==
According to the United States Census Bureau, the city has a total area of 1.08 square miles (2.80 km^{2}), all land.

=== Mohall Municipal Airport ===
The Mohall Municipal Airport is located at 48°46′06.2″N 101°32′13.2″W (48.7683833, -101.5369953), approximately one mile west of Mohall proper. Beginning operations in December 1944, the airport is owned by the city.

== Demographics ==
Historical population
Census	Pop.	Note	%±
1910	493		—
1920	651		32.0%
1930	676		3.8%
1940	687		1.6%
1950	1,073		56.2%
1960	956		−10.9%
1970	950		−0.6%
1980	1,049		10.4%
1990	931		−11.2%
2000	812		−12.8%
2010	783		−3.6%
2020	694		−11.4%
2022 (est.)	673		−3.0%
U.S. Decennial Census; 2020 Census

=== 2010 census ===
As of the census of 2010, there were 783 people, 321 households, and 199 families residing in the city. The population density was 725.0 inhabitants per square mile (279.9/km^{2}). There were 372 housing units at an average density of 344.4 per square mile (133.0/km^{2}). The racial makeup of the city was 97.1% White, 0.3% African American, 1.1% Native American, 0.1% Asian, 0.4% from other races, and 1.0% from two or more races. Hispanic or Latino of any race were 1.3% of the population.

There were 321 households, of which 28.7% had children under the age of 18 living with them, 49.8% were married couples living together, 9.3% had a female householder with no husband present, 2.8% had a male householder with no wife present, and 38.0% were non-families. 34.0% of all households were made up of individuals, and 16.8% had someone living alone who was 65 years of age or older. The average household size was 2.27 and the average family size was 2.90.

The median age in the city was 44.8 years. 22.3% of residents were under the age of 18; 6.9% were between the ages of 18 and 24; 21.3% were from 25 to 44; 26.1% were from 45 to 64; and 23.5% were 65 years of age or older. The gender makeup of the city was 49.7% male and 50.3% female.

=== 2000 census ===
As of the census of 2000, there were 812 people, 340 households and 214 families residing in the city. The population density was 747.9 inhabitants per square mile (288.8/km^{2}). There were 397 housing units at an average density of 365.6 per square mile (141.2/km^{2}). The racial makeup of the city was 98.40% White, 0.74% Native American, 0.25% Asian, and 0.62% from two or more races. Hispanic or Latino of any race were 0.25% of the population.

There were 340 households, of which 25.6% had children under the age of 18 living with them, 52.9% were married couples living together, 7.6% had a female householder with no husband present, and 36.8% were non-families. 35.0% of all households were made up of individuals, and 21.2% had someone living alone who was 65 years of age or older. The average household size was 2.22 and the average family size was 2.88.

Age distribution was 20.9% under the age of 18, 4.8% from 18 to 24, 20.8% from 25 to 44, 23.3% from 45 to 64, and 30.2% who were 65 years of age or older. The median age was 48 years. For every 100 females, there were 88.0 males. For every 100 females age 18 and over, there were 85.5 males.

The median household income was $30,139, and the median family income was $38,636. Males had a median income of $27,344 versus $16,776 for females. The per capita income for the city was $17,341. About 8.8% of families and 10.9% of the population were below the poverty line, including 11.8% of those under age 18 and 5.6% of those age 65 or over.

== Education ==
The Mohall, Lansford, and Sherwood school districts consolidated into the Mohall Lansford Sherwood School District in 2005. In order to minimize controversy, the three school districts' old nicknames (Yellowjackets, Cubs, and Wildcats, respectively) were retired, and voters in the newly consolidated district chose the Mavericks as the new nickname.

== Notable person ==
- Wayne Stenehjem, lawyer; 29th Attorney General of North Dakota

== Climate ==
This climatic region is typified by large seasonal temperature differences, with warm to hot (and often humid) summers and cold (sometimes severely cold) winters. According to the Köppen Climate Classification system, Mohall has a humid continental climate, abbreviated "Dfb" on climate maps. Mohall has a surprising amount of seasonal lag for a location so far inland, more akin to what one would see in New England than in the Great Plains. The hottest month is August and the coldest month is January, and February and March are the months where the all-time record lows occurred.

Climate data for Mohall, North Dakota (1991–2020 normals, extremes 1893–present)
Month	Jan	Feb	Mar	Apr	May	Jun	Jul	Aug	Sep	Oct	Nov	Dec	Year
Record high °F (°C)	58 (14)	64 (18)	86 (30)	92 (33)	107 (42)	108 (42)	112 (44)	107 (42)	103 (39)	93 (34)	77 (25)	69 (21)	112 (44)
Mean daily maximum °F (°C)	16.4 (−8.7)	20.6 (−6.3)	32.9 (0.5)	51.2 (10.7)	64.8 (18.2)	73.9 (23.3)	79.1 (26.2)	79.6 (26.4)	69.2 (20.7)	52.8 (11.6)	34.5 (1.4)	21.1 (−6.1)	49.7 (9.8)
Daily mean °F (°C)	7.4 (−13.7)	10.8 (−11.8)	22.9 (−5.1)	38.7 (3.7)	51.6 (10.9)	61.8 (16.6)	66.6 (19.2)	65.5 (18.6)	55.6 (13.1)	41.2 (5.1)	25.3 (−3.7)	12.5 (−10.8)	38.3 (3.5)
Mean daily minimum °F (°C)	−1.7 (−18.7)	1.0 (−17.2)	12.9 (−10.6)	26.1 (−3.3)	38.4 (3.6)	49.6 (9.8)	54.0 (12.2)	51.3 (10.7)	41.9 (5.5)	29.6 (−1.3)	16.1 (−8.8)	4.0 (−15.6)	26.9 (−2.8)
Record low °F (°C)	−47 (−44)	−48 (−44)	−48 (−44)	−22 (−30)	8 (−13)	20 (−7)	29 (−2)	21 (−6)	10 (−12)	−15 (−26)	−30 (−34)	−42 (−41)	−48 (−44)
Average precipitation inches (mm)	0.43 (11)	0.47 (12)	0.73 (19)	1.13 (29)	2.51 (64)	3.76 (96)	2.62 (67)	2.24 (57)	1.70 (43)	1.33 (34)	0.75 (19)	0.55 (14)	18.22 (463)
Source: NOAA
