= Fordville, North Dakota =

- City
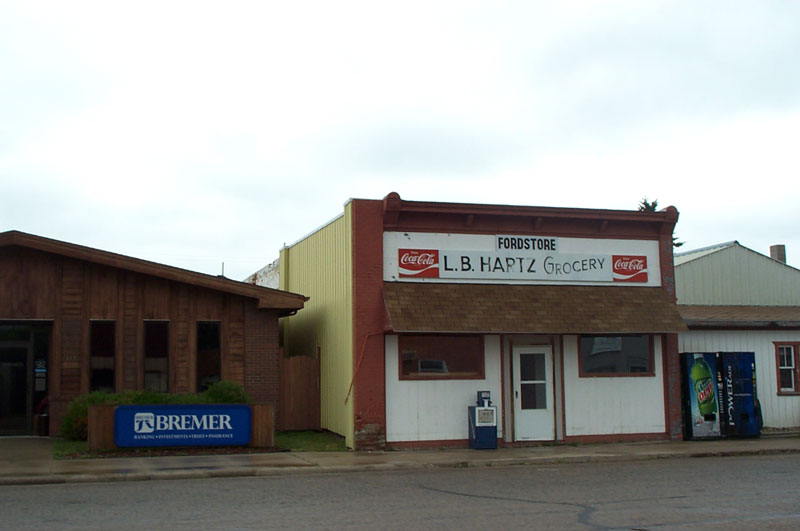
- L.B. Hartz Grocery

- Location of Fordville, North Dakota
- Coordinates: 48°13′00″N 97°47′43″W
- Country: United States
- State: North Dakota
- County: Walsh
- Founded: 1905

Area
  - Total: 1.01 sq mi (2.62 km^{2})
  - Land: 1.01 sq mi (2.62 km^{2})
  - Water: 0 sq mi (0.00 km^{2})
- Elevation: 1,145 ft (349 m)

Population (2020)
  - Total: 207
  - Estimate (2022): 203
  - Density: 200/sq mi (79/km^{2})
- Time zone: UTC-6 (Central (CST))
  - Summer (DST): UTC-5 (CDT)
- ZIP code: 58231
- Area code: 701
- FIPS code: 38-27060
- GNIS feature ID: 1036037

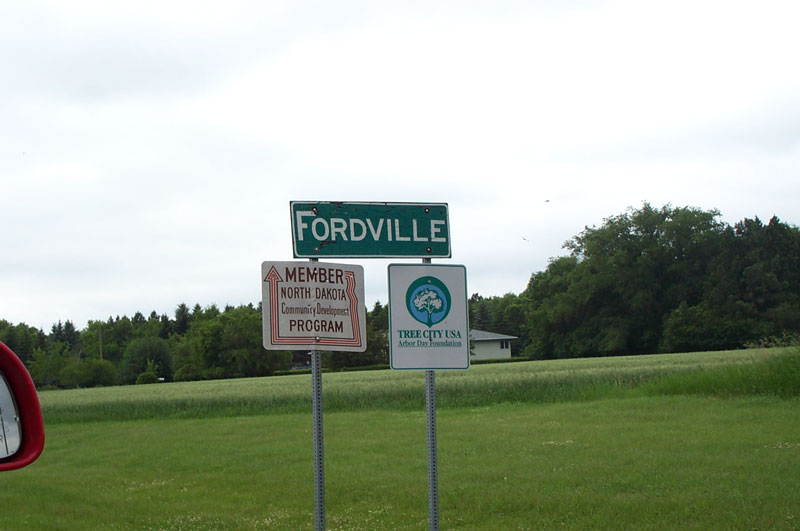

Fordville is a city in Walsh County, North Dakota, United States. The population was 207 at the 2020 census. Fordville was founded in 1905.

== Geography ==
According to the United States Census Bureau, the city has a total area of 1.01 square miles (2.62 km^{2}), all land.

== Demographics ==
Historical population
Census	Pop.	Note	%±
1920	320		—
1930	442		38.1%
1940	439		−0.7%
1950	376		−14.4%
1960	367		−2.4%
1970	361		−1.6%
1980	326		−9.7%
1990	299		−8.3%
2000	266		−11.0%
2010	212		−20.3%
2020	207		−2.4%
2022 (est.)	203		−1.9%
U.S. Decennial Census; 2020 Census

=== 2010 census ===
As of the census of 2010, there were 212 people, 101 households, and 53 families living in the city. The population density was 209.9 inhabitants per square mile (81.0/km^{2}). There were 121 housing units at an average density of 119.8 per square mile (46.3/km^{2}). The racial makeup of the city was 94.3% White, 0.5% Native American, 0.5% Asian, 2.8% from other races, and 1.9% from two or more races. Hispanic or Latino of any race were 7.5% of the population.

There were 101 households, of which 25.7% had children under the age of 18 living with them, 43.6% were married couples living together, 5.9% had a female householder with no husband present, 3.0% had a male householder with no wife present, and 47.5% were non-families. 44.6% of all households were made up of individuals, and 21.8% had someone living alone who was 65 years of age or older. The average household size was 2.10 and the average family size was 2.98.

The median age in the city was 44.5 years. 21.2% of residents were under the age of 18; 7.5% were between the ages of 18 and 24; 21.3% were from 25 to 44; 27.3% were from 45 to 64; and 22.6% were 65 years of age or older. The gender makeup of the city was 49.5% male and 50.5% female.

=== 2000 census ===
As of the census of 2000, there were 266 people, 115 households, and 73 families living in the city. The population density was 265.2 inhabitants per square mile (102.4/km^{2}). There were 131 housing units at an average density of 130.6 per square mile (50.4/km^{2}). The racial makeup of the city was 95.11% White, 0.75% African American, 3.38% Native American, 0.38% from other races, and 0.38% from two or more races. Hispanic or Latino of any race were 1.13% of the population.

There were 115 households, out of which 33.0% had children under the age of 18 living with them, 50.4% were married couples living together, 7.8% had a female householder with no husband present, and 35.7% were non-families. 34.8% of all households were made up of individuals, and 15.7% had someone living alone who was 65 years of age or older. The average household size was 2.31 and the average family size was 2.97.

In the city, the population was spread out, with 27.8% under the age of 18, 5.6% from 18 to 24, 23.3% from 25 to 44, 20.7% from 45 to 64, and 22.6% who were 65 years of age or older. The median age was 39 years. For every 100 females, there were 98.5 males. For every 100 females age 18 and over, there were 102.1 males.

The median income for a household in the city was $26,786, and the median income for a family was $40,000. Males had a median income of $25,875 versus $20,250 for females. The per capita income for the city was $12,516. About 17.9% of families and 16.6% of the population were below the poverty line, including 16.3% of those under the age of eighteen and 17.2% of those 65 or over.
