= Lansford, North Dakota =

- City
- Location of Lansford, North Dakota
- Coordinates: 48°37′37″N 101°22′33″W
- Country: United States
- State: North Dakota
- County: Bottineau
- Founded: 1903

Area
  - Total: 0.35 sq mi (0.91 km^{2})
  - Land: 0.35 sq mi (0.91 km^{2})
  - Water: 0 sq mi (0.00 km^{2})
- Elevation: 1,614 ft (492 m)

Population (2020)
  - Total: 238
  - Estimate (2022): 235
  - Density: 677.2/sq mi (261.45/km^{2})
- Time zone: UTC-6 (Central (CST))
  - Summer (DST): UTC-5 (CDT)
- ZIP code: 58750
- Area code: 701
- FIPS code: 38-44900
- GNIS feature ID: 1036119

Lansford is a city in Bottineau County, North Dakota, United States. The population was 238 at the 2020 census. Lansford was founded in 1903.

== Geography ==
According to the United States Census Bureau, the city has a total area of 0.35 square miles (0.91 km^{2}), all land.

== Demographics ==
Historical population
Census	Pop.	Note	%±
1910	456		—
1920	337		−26.1%
1930	353		4.7%
1940	300		−15.0%
1950	352		17.3%
1960	382		8.5%
1970	296		−22.5%
1980	294		−0.7%
1990	249		−15.3%
2000	253		1.6%
2010	245		−3.2%
2020	238		−2.9%
2022 (est.)	235		−1.3%
U.S. Decennial Census; 2020 Census

=== 2010 census ===
As of the census of 2010, there were 245 people, 103 households, and 73 families living in the city. The population density was 700.0 inhabitants per square mile (270.3/km^{2}). There were 128 housing units at an average density of 365.7 per square mile (141.2/km^{2}). The racial makeup of the city was 96.7% White, 1.2% African American, 0.4% Native American, 0.4% from other races, and 1.2% from two or more races. Hispanic or Latino of any race were 3.7% of the population.

There were 103 households, of which 32.0% had children under the age of 18 living with them, 60.2% were married couples living together, 6.8% had a female householder with no husband present, 3.9% had a male householder with no wife present, and 29.1% were non-families. 26.2% of all households were made up of individuals, and 2.9% had someone living alone who was 65 years of age or older. The average household size was 2.38 and the average family size was 2.82.

The median age in the city was 35.4 years. 24.5% of residents were under the age of 18; 8.2% were between the ages of 18 and 24; 30.6% were from 25 to 44; 28.9% were from 45 to 64; and 7.8% were 65 years of age or older. The gender makeup of the city was 55.1% male and 44.9% female.

=== 2000 census ===
As of the census of 2000, there were 253 people, 106 households, and 73 families living in the city. The population density was 726.3 inhabitants per square mile (280.4/km^{2}). There were 131 housing units at an average density of 376.1 per square mile (145.2/km^{2}). The racial makeup of the city was 98.81% White, 0.79% African American, and 0.40% from two or more races. Hispanic or Latino of any race were 0.40% of the population.

There were 106 households, out of which 35.8% had children under the age of 18 living with them, 61.3% were married couples living together, 4.7% had a female householder with no husband present, and 31.1% were non-families. 28.3% of all households were made up of individuals, and 12.3% had someone living alone who was 65 years of age or older. The average household size was 2.39 and the average family size was 2.95.

In the city, the population was spread out, with 25.7% under the age of 18, 6.7% from 18 to 24, 35.2% from 25 to 44, 20.2% from 45 to 64, and 12.3% who were 65 years of age or older. The median age was 37 years. For every 100 females, there were 107.4 males. For every 100 females age 18 and over, there were 104.3 males.

The median income for a household in the city was $37,250, and the median income for a family was $42,308. Males had a median income of $24,028 versus $19,821 for females. The per capita income for the city was $17,463. About 2.8% of families and 4.2% of the population were below the poverty line, including 3.6% of those under the age of eighteen and 6.1% of those 65 or over.

== Education ==
The Mohall, Lansford, and Sherwood school districts consolidated into the Mohall Lansford Sherwood School District in 2005. In order to minimize controversy, the three school districts' old nicknames (Yellowjackets, Cubs, and Wildcats, respectively) were retired, and voters in the newly consolidated district chose the Mavericks as the new nickname.

== Notable people ==
- David O'Connell, North Dakota state legislator
- Henry J. Savelkoul, Minnesota state representative

== Climate ==
This climatic region is typified by large seasonal temperature differences, with warm to hot (and often humid) summers and cold (sometimes severely cold) winters. According to the Köppen Climate Classification system, Lansford has a humid continental climate, abbreviated "Dfb" on climate maps.
