= 2008 United States presidential election in North Dakota =

- November 4, 2008
- Turnout: 64.89%

Nominee	John McCain	Barack Obama
Party	Republican	Democratic–NPL
Home state	Arizona	Illinois
Running mate	Sarah Palin	Joe Biden
Electoral vote	3	0
Popular vote	168,887	141,403
Percentage	53.15%	44.62%
County results
McCain
40–50%
50–60%
60–70%
70–80%
Obama
50–60%
60–70%
70–80%
80–90%
President before election
George W. Bush
Republican
Elected President
Barack Obama
Democratic-NPL

The 2008 United States presidential election in North Dakota took place on November 4, 2008, and was part of the 2008 United States presidential election. Voters chose three representatives, or electors to the Electoral College, who voted for president and vice president.

North Dakota was won by Republican nominee John McCain by an 8.5% margin of victory. Prior to the election, most news organizations considered this a state McCain would narrowly win, or otherwise considered to be a red state. In the final weeks of the race, some news organizations considered the race a toss-up. The state has not been won by a Democratic presidential nominee since Lyndon B. Johnson in 1964. Polls showed McCain and Democrat Barack Obama running unusually close in a state that gave George W. Bush a 27.4% margin of victory over John Kerry in 2004. In the end, McCain kept North Dakota in the GOP column but by a much smaller margin than Bush's landslide in 2004.

As of the 2024 presidential election, this is the last time a Democratic presidential candidate won at least 40% of the vote in North Dakota and the last time in which Cass County, Grand Forks County, Mountrail County, Towner County, Traill County, Nelson County, and Eddy County voted for a Democratic presidential candidate. Obama's 44.6% vote share also remains the best Democratic performance in the state since 1976.

== Caucuses ==
- 2008 North Dakota Democratic presidential caucuses
- 2008 North Dakota Republican presidential caucuses

== Campaign ==
=== Predictions ===
There were 16 news organizations who made state-by-state predictions of the election. Here are their last predictions before election day:

Source	Ranking
D.C. Political Report	Likely R
Cook Political Report	Toss-up
The Takeaway	Lean R
Electoral-vote.com	Lean R
Washington Post	Lean R
Politico	Solid R
RealClearPolitics	Toss-up
FiveThirtyEight	Solid R
CQ Politics	Toss-up
The New York Times	Lean R
CNN	Toss-up
NPR	Lean R
MSNBC	Toss-up
Fox News	Likely R
Associated Press	Likely R
Rasmussen Reports	Safe R

=== Polling ===
Pre-election polls showed a complete toss up. The final three polls averaged gave Obama leading 45% to 44%, leaving a lot of undecided voters.

=== Fundraising ===
John McCain raised a total of $184,405 in the state. Barack Obama raised $191,551.

=== Advertising and visits ===
Obama and his interest groups spent $448,361. McCain and his interest groups spent $71,972. Obama visited the state once, in Fargo, North Dakota, while the Republican ticket didn't visit the state once.

== Analysis ==
North Dakota has been considered a reliably red state for the past 40 years, having voted for the Republican presidential nominee of every election since 1968. In 2008, however, polls taken before September surprisingly showed the two candidates running neck-to-neck. While the polls varied throughout the campaign, McCain's selection of the socially conservative Governor Sarah Palin of Alaska as his vice presidential running mate played well in North Dakota, a state that has the lowest percentage of nonreligious citizens in the country. After Palin joined the ticket in late August, McCain then took a double digit lead in the state until October, when polling once again showed a close race between the two candidates in North Dakota.

On Election Day 2008, however, McCain captured North Dakota by a fairly safe margin of approximately 8.65 points, despite the latest polling showing him just one point ahead of Obama. Still, the statewide result was significantly closer than in 2004 when Bush carried the state by a much larger margin of more than 27%. McCain did well throughout the western and central parts of the state, while Obama won the two majority Native American counties of Rolette (which has not voted Republican since Dwight D. Eisenhower in 1952) in the north and Sioux in the south by more than three-to-one. More significantly, Obama carried several normally Republican counties in the east including the most populous counties of Cass County (which contains the state's largest city of Fargo) and Grand Forks County (which includes the college town of Grand Forks). In these two largest counties in the state, Obama was the first Democratic victor since Lyndon Johnson in 1964, while in rock-ribbed Republican and heavily German McIntosh County, Obama's 37.79 percent constitutes the best performance by a Democrat since Franklin D. Roosevelt in 1936.

At the same time, popular incumbent Republican Governor John Hoeven was reelected to a third term in a landslide three-to-one victory over Democrat Tim Mathern and Independent DuWayne Hendrickson. Hoeven received 74.44% of the vote while Mathern took in 23.53% and Hendrickson with the remaining 2.03%. Democrats, however, made gains at the state level, picking up three seats in the North Dakota House of Representatives and six seats in the North Dakota Senate.

== Results ==
2008 United States presidential election in North Dakota
Party	Candidate	Running mate	Votes	Percentage	Electoral votes
Republican	John McCain	Sarah Palin	168,887	53.15%	3
Democratic-NPL	Barack Obama	Joe Biden	141,403	44.50%	0
Independent	Ralph Nader	Matt Gonzalez	4,199	1.32%	0
Write-ins	Write-ins		1,123 (Note: These write-in votes are not listed in some totals and were not separated by county.)	0.35%	0
Libertarian	Bob Barr	Wayne Allyn Root	1,067	0.34%	0
Constitution	Chuck Baldwin	Darrell Castle	1,059	0.33%	0
Totals			317,738	100.00%	3
Voter turnout (Voting age population)					65.6%

=== By county ===
County	John McCain Republican		Barack Obama Democratic-NPL		Ralph Nader Independent		Bob Barr Libertarian		Charles Baldwin Constitution		Margin		Total votes cast
County	#	%	#	%	#	%	#	%	#	%	#	%	Total votes cast
Adams	788	62.00%	435	34.23%	29	2.28%	6	0.47%	13	1.02%	353	27.77%	1,271
Barnes	2,826	49.63%	2,741	48.14%	66	1.16%	14	0.25%	47	0.83%	85	1.49%	5,694
Benson	773	32.56%	1,569	66.09%	21	0.88%	5	0.21%	6	0.25%	-796	-33.53%	2,374
Billings	375	75.15%	114	22.85%	7	1.40%	3	0.60%	0	0.00%	261	52.30%	499
Bottineau	2,059	58.56%	1,387	39.45%	40	1.14%	13	0.37%	17	0.48%	672	19.11%	3,516
Bowman	1,107	67.50%	478	29.15%	37	2.26%	5	0.30%	13	0.79%	629	38.35%	1,640
Burke	640	67.87%	286	30.33%	11	1.17%	3	0.32%	3	0.32%	354	37.54%	943
Burleigh	25,443	60.58%	15,600	37.14%	513	1.22%	113	0.27%	103	0.25%	9,843	23.44%	41,999
Cass	32,566	45.34%	37,622	52.37%	755	1.05%	270	0.38%	206	0.29%	-5,056	-7.03%	71,834
Cavalier	1,128	52.96%	930	43.66%	56	2.63%	6	0.28%	10	0.47%	198	9.30%	2,130
Dickey	1,525	58.21%	1,044	39.85%	34	1.30%	6	0.23%	11	0.42%	481	18.36%	2,620
Divide	630	55.70%	464	41.03%	25	2.21%	6	0.53%	6	0.53%	166	14.67%	1,131
Dunn	1,080	65.69%	527	32.06%	29	1.76%	3	0.18%	5	0.30%	553	33.63%	1,644
Eddy	548	47.04%	583	50.04%	21	1.80%	7	0.60%	6	0.52%	-35	-3.00%	1,165
Emmons	1,230	66.96%	546	29.72%	41	2.23%	8	0.44%	12	0.65%	684	37.24%	1,837
Foster	914	55.36%	687	41.61%	31	1.88%	8	0.48%	11	0.67%	227	13.75%	1,651
Golden Valley	642	73.37%	210	24.00%	14	1.60%	1	0.11%	8	0.91%	432	49.37%	875
Grand Forks	14,520	46.34%	16,104	51.40%	338	1.08%	110	0.35%	81	0.26%	-1,584	-5.06%	31,333
Grant	873	64.91%	405	30.11%	27	2.01%	10	0.74%	8	0.59%	468	34.80%	1,345
Griggs	682	51.90%	598	45.51%	26	1.98%	5	0.38%	3	0.23%	84	6.39%	1,314
Hettinger	893	66.25%	406	30.12%	32	2.37%	9	0.67%	8	0.59%	487	36.13%	1,348
Kidder	752	61.24%	422	34.36%	29	2.36%	14	1.14%	11	0.90%	330	26.88%	1,228
LaMoure	1,310	58.46%	868	38.73%	41	1.83%	10	0.45%	12	0.54%	442	19.73%	2,241
Logan	726	68.68%	299	28.29%	26	2.46%	2	0.19%	4	0.38%	427	40.39%	1,057
McHenry	1,374	56.87%	981	40.60%	49	2.03%	6	0.25%	6	0.25%	393	16.27%	2,416
McIntosh	916	59.79%	579	37.79%	29	1.89%	2	0.13%	6	0.39%	337	22.00%	1,532
McKenzie	1,740	64.09%	933	34.36%	33	1.22%	6	0.22%	3	0.11%	807	29.73%	2,715
McLean	2,767	58.42%	1,867	39.42%	75	1.58%	17	0.36%	10	0.21%	900	19.00%	4,736
Mercer	2,789	63.43%	1,476	33.57%	89	2.02%	19	0.43%	24	0.55%	1,313	29.86%	4,397
Morton	7,869	58.99%	5,079	38.08%	219	1.64%	54	0.40%	43	0.32%	2,790	20.91%	13,339
Mountrail	1,406	47.86%	1,477	50.27%	36	1.23%	6	0.20%	13	0.44%	-71	-2.41%	2,938
Nelson	800	45.66%	907	51.77%	32	1.83%	7	0.40%	6	0.34%	-107	-6.11%	1,752
Oliver	682	65.58%	332	31.92%	20	1.92%	5	0.48%	1	0.10%	350	33.66%	1,040
Pembina	1,722	52.07%	1,494	45.18%	47	1.42%	21	0.64%	23	0.70%	228	6.89%	3,307
Pierce	1,301	60.82%	792	37.03%	34	1.59%	4	0.19%	8	0.37%	509	23.79%	2,139
Ramsey	2,361	49.58%	2,314	48.59%	57	1.20%	15	0.31%	15	0.31%	47	0.99%	4,762
Ransom	998	41.02%	1,371	56.35%	43	1.77%	15	0.62%	6	0.25%	-373	-15.33%	2,433
Renville	799	59.36%	505	37.52%	29	2.15%	10	0.74%	3	0.22%	294	21.84%	1,346
Richland	3,900	51.57%	3,513	46.45%	107	1.41%	21	0.28%	22	0.29%	387	5.12%	7,563
Rolette	1,045	23.05%	3,403	75.06%	53	1.17%	17	0.37%	16	0.35%	-2,358	-52.01%	4,534
Sargent	778	40.37%	1,115	57.86%	26	1.35%	4	0.21%	4	0.21%	-337	-17.49%	1,927
Sheridan	555	69.12%	229	28.52%	15	1.87%	1	0.12%	3	0.37%	326	40.60%	803
Sioux	215	15.60%	1,145	83.09%	12	0.87%	3	0.22%	3	0.22%	-930	-67.49%	1,378
Slope	297	72.26%	106	25.79%	4	0.97%	3	0.73%	1	0.24%	191	46.47%	411
Stark	7,024	63.13%	3,802	34.17%	172	1.55%	35	0.31%	37	0.33%	3,222	28.96%	11,127
Steele	404	39.15%	614	59.50%	11	1.07%	1	0.10%	2	0.19%	-210	-20.35%	1,032
Stutsman	5,499	56.20%	4,056	41.46%	156	1.59%	27	0.28%	46	0.47%	1,443	14.74%	9,784
Towner	536	44.78%	621	51.88%	33	2.76%	1	0.08%	6	0.50%	-85	-7.10%	1,197
Traill	1,845	45.66%	2,136	52.86%	43	1.06%	7	0.17%	10	0.25%	-291	-7.20%	4,041
Walsh	2,415	49.47%	2,325	47.62%	94	1.93%	20	0.41%	28	0.57%	90	1.85%	4,882
Ward	15,061	58.45%	10,144	39.37%	285	1.11%	65	0.25%	66	0.26%	4,917	19.08%	25,768
Wells	1,468	61.76%	841	35.38%	43	1.81%	5	0.21%	20	0.84%	627	26.38%	2,377
Williams	6,291	67.12%	2,921	31.16%	104	1.11%	36	0.38%	21	0.22%	3,370	35.96%	9,373
Totals	168,887	53.15%	141,403	44.50%	4,199	1.32%	1,067	0.34%	1,059	0.33%	27,484	8.65%	317,738

Counties that flipped from Republican to Democratic

- Cass (largest city: Fargo)
- Eddy (largest city: New Rockford)
- Grand Forks (largest city: Grand Forks)
- Mountrail (largest city: Stanley)
- Nelson (largest city: Lakota)
- Ransom (largest city: Lisbon)
- Sargent (largest city: Gwinner)
- Towner (largest city: Cando)
- Traill (largest city: Mayville)

=== By congressional district ===
Due to the state's low population, only one congressional district is allocated. This district is an at-large district, because it covers the entire state, and thus is equivalent to the statewide election results.

District	McCain	Obama	Representative
At-large	53.1%	44.5%	Earl Pomeroy

== Electors ==
Technically the voters of North Dakota cast their ballots for electors: representatives to the Electoral College. North Dakota is allocated 3 electors because it has 1 congressional districts and 2 senators. All candidates who appear on the ballot or qualify to receive write-in votes must submit a list of 3 electors, who pledge to vote for their candidate and their running mate. Whoever wins the majority of votes in the state is awarded all 3 electoral votes. Their chosen electors then vote for president and vice president. Although electors are pledged to their candidate and running mate, they are not obligated to vote for them. An elector who votes for someone other than their candidate is known as a faithless elector.

The electors of each state and the District of Columbia met on December 15, 2008, to cast their votes for president and vice president. The Electoral College itself never meets as one body. Instead the electors from each state and the District of Columbia met in their respective capitols.

The following were the members of the Electoral College from the state. All 3 pledged to John McCain and Sarah Palin:

1. Theresa Tokach - replaced Richard Elkin
2. Susan Wefald
3. Leon Helland

== See also ==
- United States presidential elections in North Dakota
- Presidency of Barack Obama
