= 2016 United States presidential election in North Dakota =

- November 8, 2016
- Turnout: 61.29% ▲0.18 pp

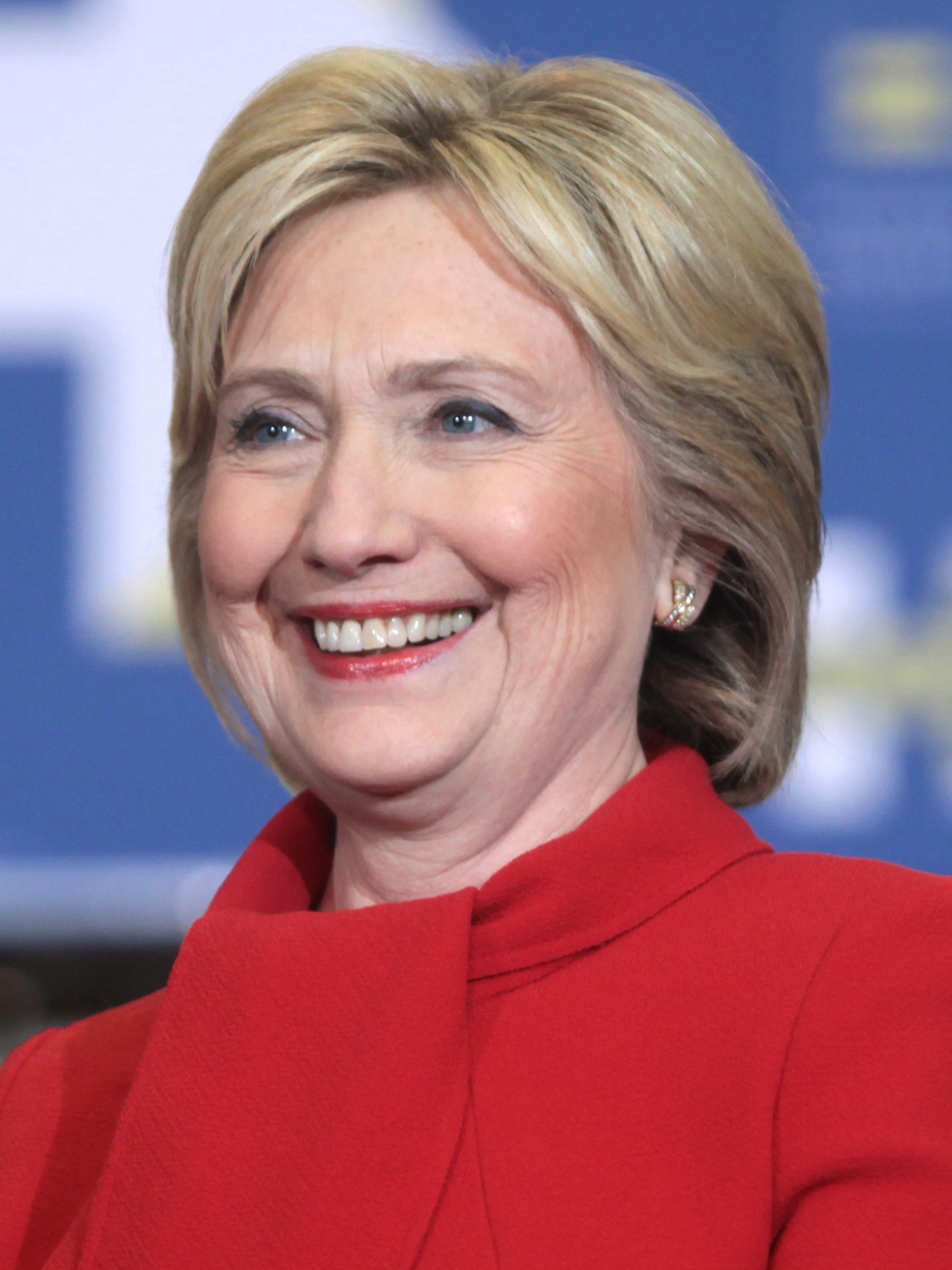

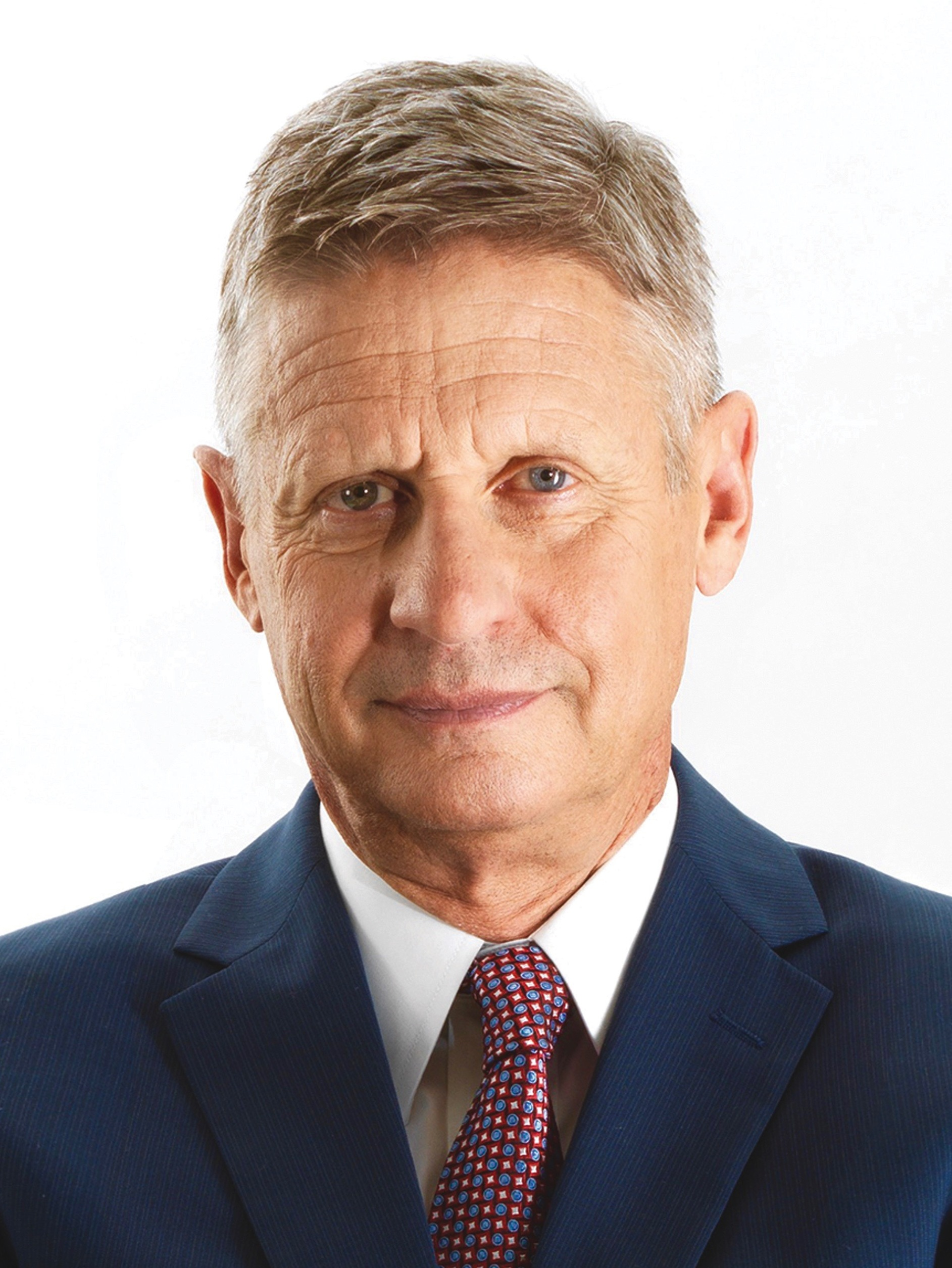
| Nominee | Donald Trump | Hillary Clinton | Gary Johnson |
| Party | Republican | Democratic–NPL | Libertarian |
| Home state | New York | New York | New Mexico |
| Running mate | Mike Pence | Tim Kaine | Bill Weld |
| Electoral vote | 3 | 0 | 0 |
| Popular vote | 216,794 | 93,758 | 21,434 |
| Percentage | 62.96% | 27.23% | 6.22% |

Trump
40–50%
50–60%
60–70%
70–80%
80–90%
90–100%
Clinton
40–50%
50–60%
60–70%
70–80%
80–90%
President before election
Barack Obama
Democratic-NPL
Elected President
Donald Trump
Republican

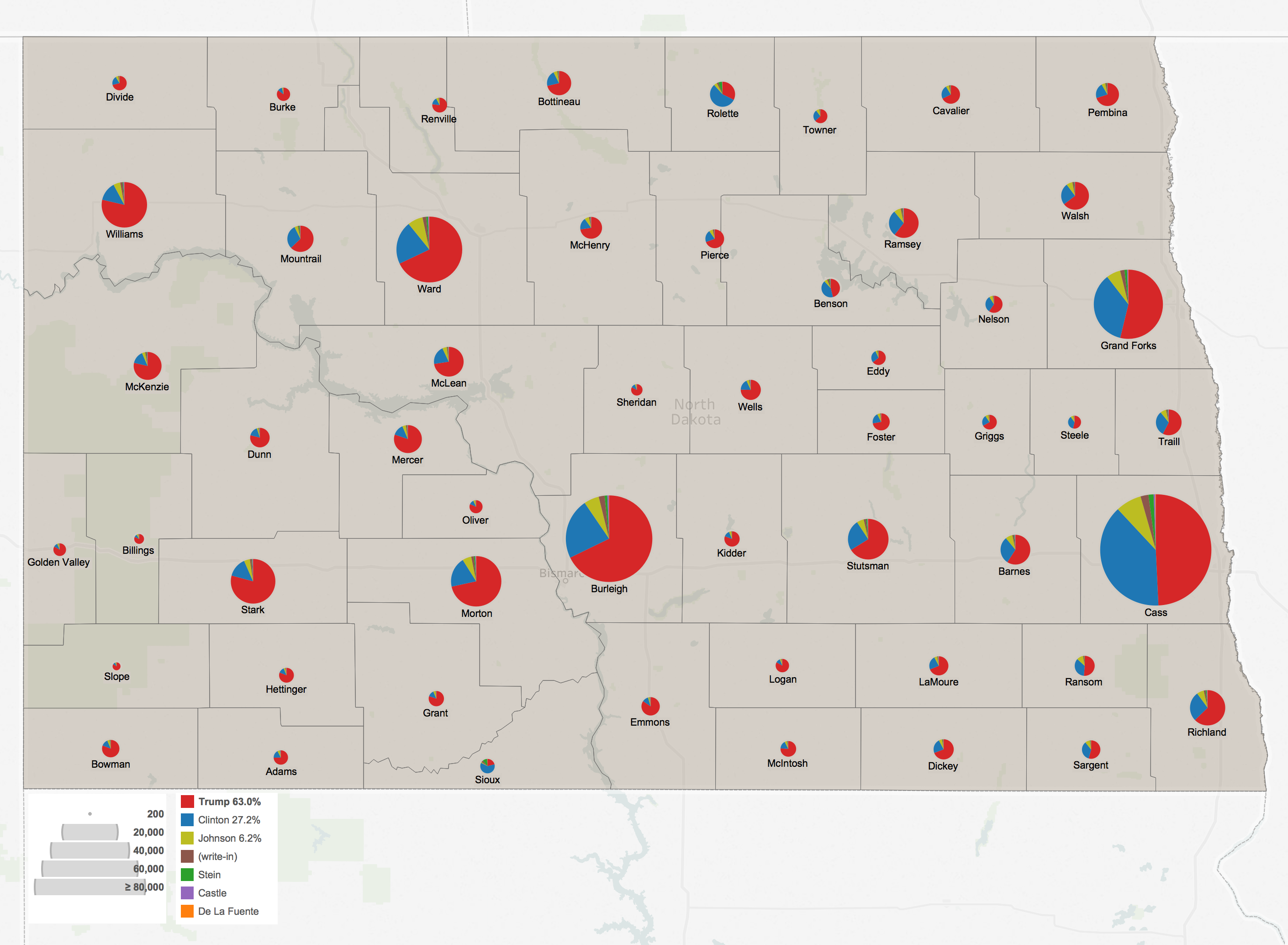
Results by county showing number of votes by size and candidates by color

Treemap of the popular vote by county

The 2016 United States presidential election in North Dakota was held on Tuesday, November 8, 2016, as part of the 2016 United States presidential election in which all 50 states plus the District of Columbia participated. North Dakota voters chose electors to represent them in the Electoral College via a popular vote, pitting the Republican nominee, businessman Donald Trump, and running mate Indiana Governor Mike Pence against Democratic nominee, former Secretary of State Hillary Clinton, and her running mate Virginia Senator Tim Kaine. North Dakota has three electoral votes in the Electoral College.

On June 7, 2016, as part of the Democratic Party presidential primaries, North Dakota voters expressed their preferences for the Democratic nominees for president. As North Dakota does not have a voter registration system, all voters could choose to participate in this caucus. Due to a disagreement about the binding of delegates between state and national party leaders, no Republican Party primary or caucus was held. Instead, delegates were chosen at the state party convention April 1–3.

Trump won the election in North Dakota with 63.0% of the vote, making it his fourth-strongest state in the 2016 election, after West Virginia, Wyoming, and Oklahoma. Clinton received 27.2% of the vote, at the time the largest loss by a Democrat since Democratic nominee Jimmy Carter in 1980. The state also gave North Dakota-born Libertarian candidate Gary Johnson his second-best showing with 6.2% of the vote, only behind the 9.3% vote share that he received in his home state of New Mexico.

North Dakota shifted rightward by 16.11%, marking the strongest rightward shift made by any state in 2016. However, in terms of individual electoral votes, Maine's 2nd congressional district saw a stronger rightward shift of 18.85%. This highlighted the strong rightward shift among white working class voters, particularly in rural areas in Northern states.

== Caucuses ==
=== Democratic caucus ===
Three candidates appeared on the Democratic presidential primary ballot:

North Dakota Democratic caucuses, June 7, 2016
| Candidate | District delegates | | State delegates | | |
| Candidate | Count | Percentage | Pledged | Unpledged | Total |
|---|---|---|---|---|---|
| Bernie Sanders | 253 | 64.21% | 13 | 1 | 14 |
| Hillary Clinton | 101 | 25.63% | 5 | 1 | 6 |
| Uncommitted | 40 | 10.15% | 0 | 0 | 0 |
| Total | 394 | 100% | 18 | 5 | 23 |

=== Republican convention ===
The North Dakota Republican Party did not hold a presidential preference caucus or primary, but instead selected 28 Republican National Convention delegates unpledged to any particular candidate at the state party convention, which was held April 1–3, 2016. A generally pro-Cruz slate of delegates was elected to the convention. Cruz had the support of 14 delegates before he dropped out of the race. Three of them switched to Trump on May 27 along with all 13 of the uncommitted delegates giving Trump the majority of commitments and the support of 17 delegates (Trump had the support of 1 delegate before Cruz dropped out).

North Dakota Republican state convention, April 1–3, 2016
| Candidate | Actual delegate count | | |
| Candidate | Bound | Unbound | Total |
|---|---|---|---|
| Donald Trump | 0 | 17 | 17 |
| Ted Cruz | 0 | 11 | 11 |
| John Kasich | 0 | 0 | 0 |
| (available) | 0 | 0 | 0 |
| Unprojected delegates: | 0 | 0 | 0 |
| Total: | 0 | 28 | 28 |
Source: The Green Papers

== General election ==
=== Voting history ===
North Dakota joined the Union in November 1889 and has participated in all elections from 1892 onwards.

Since 1900, North Dakota voted Democratic 17.24 percent of the time and Republican 82.76 percent of the time.

Since 1968, the state has always voted Republican.

=== Predictions ===
The following are final 2016 predictions from various organizations for North Dakota as of Election Day.

| Source | Ranking | As of |
|---|---|---|
| Los Angeles Times | Safe R | November 6, 2016 |
| CNN | Safe R | November 8, 2016 |
| Sabato's Crystal Ball | Safe R | November 7, 2016 |
| NBC | Likely R | November 7, 2016 |
| RealClearPolitics | Safe R | November 8, 2016 |
| Fox News | Safe R | November 7, 2016 |
| ABC | Safe R | November 7, 2016 |

=== Results ===
2016 United States presidential election in North Dakota
| Party | Candidate | Votes | % |
|---|---|---|---|
| Republican | Donald Trump; Mike Pence | 216,794 | 62.96 |
| Democratic–NPL | Hillary Clinton; Tim Kaine | 93,758 | 27.23 |
| Libertarian | Gary Johnson; Bill Weld | 21,434 | 6.22 |
| Green | Jill Stein; Ajamu Baraka | 3,780 | 1.10 |
| Constitution | Darrell L. Castle; Scott N. Bradley | 1,833 | 0.53 |
| American Delta | Rocky De La Fuente; Michael Steinberg | 364 | 0.11 |
| Write-in | | 6,397 | 1.86 |
| Total votes | | 344,360 | 100% |
| Republican hold | | | |

==== By county ====
Results by county were as follows.

| County | Donald Trump Republican | | Hillary Clinton Democratic-NPL | | Various candidates Other parties | | Margin | | Total |
| County | # | % | # | % | # | % | # | % | Total |
|---|---|---|---|---|---|---|---|---|---|
| Adams | 909 | 74.63% | 216 | 17.73% | 93 | 7.64% | 693 | 56.90% | 1,218 |
| Barnes | 3,160 | 59.13% | 1,597 | 29.88% | 587 | 10.99% | 1,563 | 29.25% | 5,344 |
| Benson | 929 | 46.20% | 842 | 41.87% | 240 | 11.93% | 87 | 4.33% | 2,011 |
| Billings | 495 | 81.82% | 59 | 9.75% | 51 | 8.43% | 436 | 72.07% | 605 |
| Bottineau | 2,494 | 71.38% | 736 | 21.06% | 264 | 7.56% | 1,758 | 50.32% | 3,494 |
| Bowman | 1,446 | 80.92% | 227 | 12.70% | 114 | 6.38% | 1,219 | 68.22% | 1,787 |
| Burke | 895 | 85.08% | 119 | 11.31% | 38 | 3.61% | 776 | 73.77% | 1,052 |
| Burleigh | 32,532 | 67.80% | 10,881 | 22.68% | 4,566 | 9.52% | 21,651 | 45.12% | 47,979 |
| Cass | 39,816 | 49.26% | 31,361 | 38.80% | 9,644 | 11.94% | 8,455 | 10.46% | 80,821 |
| Cavalier | 1,357 | 67.65% | 476 | 23.73% | 173 | 8.62% | 881 | 43.92% | 2,006 |
| Dickey | 1,667 | 69.26% | 554 | 23.02% | 186 | 7.72% | 1,113 | 46.24% | 2,407 |
| Divide | 867 | 71.12% | 245 | 20.10% | 107 | 8.78% | 622 | 51.02% | 1,219 |
| Dunn | 1,771 | 78.96% | 358 | 15.96% | 114 | 5.08% | 1,413 | 63.00% | 2,243 |
| Eddy | 791 | 64.26% | 355 | 28.84% | 85 | 6.90% | 436 | 35.42% | 1,231 |
| Emmons | 1,677 | 84.65% | 215 | 10.85% | 89 | 4.50% | 1,462 | 73.80% | 1,981 |
| Foster | 1,241 | 72.19% | 347 | 20.19% | 131 | 7.62% | 894 | 52.00% | 1,719 |
| Golden Valley | 796 | 83.18% | 99 | 10.34% | 62 | 6.48% | 697 | 72.84% | 957 |
| Grand Forks | 16,340 | 53.81% | 10,851 | 35.74% | 3,174 | 10.45% | 5,489 | 18.07% | 30,365 |
| Grant | 1,108 | 80.23% | 185 | 13.40% | 88 | 6.37% | 923 | 66.83% | 1,381 |
| Griggs | 847 | 66.96% | 298 | 23.56% | 120 | 9.48% | 549 | 43.40% | 1,265 |
| Hettinger | 1,050 | 81.02% | 168 | 12.96% | 78 | 6.02% | 882 | 68.06% | 1,296 |
| Kidder | 1,111 | 80.74% | 179 | 13.01% | 86 | 6.25% | 932 | 67.73% | 1,376 |
| LaMoure | 1,481 | 68.85% | 502 | 23.34% | 168 | 7.81% | 979 | 45.51% | 2,151 |
| Logan | 888 | 83.22% | 114 | 10.68% | 65 | 6.10% | 774 | 72.54% | 1,067 |
| McHenry | 2,050 | 72.70% | 490 | 17.38% | 280 | 9.92% | 1,560 | 55.32% | 2,820 |
| McIntosh | 1,100 | 76.07% | 235 | 16.25% | 111 | 7.68% | 865 | 59.82% | 1,446 |
| McKenzie | 3,670 | 78.55% | 698 | 14.94% | 304 | 6.51% | 2,972 | 63.61% | 4,672 |
| McLean | 3,860 | 72.62% | 1,081 | 20.34% | 374 | 7.04% | 2,779 | 52.28% | 5,315 |
| Mercer | 3,759 | 80.29% | 621 | 13.26% | 302 | 6.45% | 3,138 | 67.03% | 4,682 |
| Morton | 11,336 | 71.60% | 3,080 | 19.45% | 1,416 | 8.95% | 8,256 | 52.15% | 15,832 |
| Mountrail | 2,582 | 62.88% | 1,220 | 29.71% | 304 | 7.41% | 1,362 | 33.17% | 4,106 |
| Nelson | 1,025 | 59.70% | 536 | 31.22% | 156 | 9.08% | 489 | 28.48% | 1,717 |
| Oliver | 830 | 81.61% | 119 | 11.70% | 68 | 6.69% | 711 | 69.91% | 1,017 |
| Pembina | 2,208 | 70.03% | 681 | 21.60% | 264 | 8.37% | 1,527 | 48.43% | 3,153 |
| Pierce | 1,437 | 69.39% | 431 | 20.81% | 203 | 9.80% | 1,006 | 48.58% | 2,071 |
| Ramsey | 3,217 | 60.64% | 1,505 | 28.37% | 583 | 10.99% | 1,712 | 32.27% | 5,305 |
| Ransom | 1,210 | 51.29% | 838 | 35.52% | 311 | 13.19% | 372 | 15.77% | 2,359 |
| Renville | 993 | 76.80% | 201 | 15.55% | 99 | 7.65% | 792 | 61.25% | 1,293 |
| Richland | 4,767 | 62.79% | 2,064 | 27.19% | 761 | 10.02% | 2,703 | 35.60% | 7,592 |
| Rolette | 1,217 | 32.41% | 2,099 | 55.90% | 439 | 11.69% | -882 | -23.49% | 3,755 |
| Sargent | 1,088 | 54.48% | 694 | 34.75% | 215 | 10.77% | 394 | 19.73% | 1,997 |
| Sheridan | 650 | 82.59% | 95 | 12.07% | 42 | 5.34% | 555 | 70.52% | 787 |
| Sioux | 260 | 21.10% | 758 | 61.53% | 214 | 17.37% | -498 | -40.43% | 1,232 |
| Slope | 362 | 84.19% | 43 | 10.00% | 25 | 5.81% | 319 | 74.19% | 430 |
| Stark | 9,755 | 79.17% | 1,753 | 14.23% | 814 | 6.60% | 8,002 | 64.94% | 12,322 |
| Steele | 538 | 53.85% | 361 | 36.14% | 100 | 10.01% | 177 | 17.71% | 999 |
| Stutsman | 6,718 | 66.15% | 2,498 | 24.60% | 939 | 9.25% | 4,220 | 41.55% | 10,155 |
| Towner | 733 | 63.35% | 305 | 26.36% | 119 | 10.29% | 428 | 36.99% | 1,157 |
| Traill | 2,265 | 57.59% | 1,241 | 31.55% | 427 | 10.86% | 1,024 | 26.04% | 3,933 |
| Walsh | 2,995 | 64.60% | 1,167 | 25.17% | 474 | 10.23% | 1,828 | 39.43% | 4,636 |
| Ward | 18,636 | 67.98% | 5,806 | 21.18% | 2,970 | 10.84% | 12,830 | 46.80% | 27,412 |
| Wells | 1,796 | 75.37% | 419 | 17.58% | 168 | 7.05% | 1,377 | 57.79% | 2,383 |
| Williams | 10,069 | 78.62% | 1,735 | 13.55% | 1,003 | 7.83% | 8,334 | 65.07% | 12,807 |
| Totals | 216,794 | 62.96% | 93,758 | 27.23% | 33,808 | 9.81% | 123,036 | 35.73% | 344,360 |

Counties that flipped from Democratic to Republican

- Benson (largest CDP: Fort Totten)
- Ransom (largest city: Lisbon)
- Sargent (largest city: Gwinner)
- Steele (largest city: Finley)

==== By congressional district ====
Due to the state's low population, only one congressional district is allocated. This district is an at-large district, because it covers the entire state, and thus is equivalent to the statewide election results.

| District | Trump | Clinton | Representative |
|---|---|---|---|
| At-large | 62.96% | 27.23% | Kevin Cramer |

== Analysis ==
Republican nominee Donald Trump won North Dakota in a 36-percentage-point victory over Democratic rival Hillary Clinton, thus carrying the state's 3 electoral votes. Like many neighboring majority-white, largely rural Great Plains and prairie states, North Dakota has not supported a Democratic candidate for president since Lyndon B. Johnson in 1964.

North Dakota politics are dominated by the farm, with a largely white and older populace who are socially conservative. Though the state's farming population has briefly flirted with populism, that movement is now mostly faded from North Dakota politics, as farms in North Dakota are no longer tilled by solitary yeoman and are no longer family-owned as much, and are replaced by agribusinesses.

In recent presidential elections, Bakken shale oil has been a major driver of conservative success in the state, as its economy is increasingly fueled by the North Dakota oil boom and its population grows suspect of the environmental movement championed by Democrats. The main oil boom has taken place in the counties west and northwest of Bismarck, where Donald Trump won sometimes north of 80% of the vote.

Trump won in Grand Forks County which contains the city of Grand Forks, in Cass County which contains the city of Fargo, and in Burleigh County which contains the capital city of Bismarck. He also swept most of the rural and deeply conservative counties of the state, sometimes taking more than 80% of the vote in a county. Clinton won resoundingly in Sioux County, which is majority Native American and is the site of the Dakota Access Pipeline Protest by its inhabitants, the Sioux Indian tribe.

== See also ==
- United States presidential elections in North Dakota
- First presidency of Donald Trump
- 2016 Democratic Party presidential debates and forums
- 2016 Democratic Party presidential primaries
- 2016 Republican Party presidential debates and forums
- 2016 Republican Party presidential primaries
