= Libertarian Party of North Dakota =

State affiliate of the Libertarian Party

- Chairperson: Taylor Bakken
- Secretary: Maggie Kohls
- Founded: 1971
- Ideology: Libertarianism
- National affiliation: Libertarian Party
- North Dakota Senate: 0 / 47
- North Dakota House of Representatives: 0 / 94
- U.S. Senate (North Dakota): 0 / 2
- U.S. House of Representatives (North Dakota): 0 / 1
- Other elected officials: 0 (June 2024)

Website
- lpnorthdakota.org

The Libertarian Party of North Dakota is the North Dakota affiliate of the Libertarian Party. The state chair is Taylor Bakken.

== Vote totals for Libertarian candidates in North Dakota ==
=== U.S. President ===
Year	Candidate	Votes	Percentage
1976	Roger MacBride	256	0.1%
1980	Ed Clark	3,743	1.2%
1984	David Bergland	703	0.2%
1988	Ron Paul	1,315	0.4%
1992	Andre Marrou	416	0.1%
1996	Harry Browne	847	0.3%
2000	Harry Browne	660	0.2%
2004	Michael Badnarik	851	0.3%
2008	Bob Barr	1,354	0.4%
2012	Gary Johnson	5,231	1.6%
2016	Gary Johnson	21,434	6.2%
2020	Jo Jorgensen	9,393	2.6%

U.S. House

Year	Candidate	Votes	Percentage
2012	Eric Olson	10,261	3.3%
2014	Robert Seaman	14,531	5.8%
2016	Jack Seaman	23,528	7.0%
2020	Steven Peterson	12,024	3.4%

== See also ==
- List of state Libertarian Parties in the United States
