= 2024 United States presidential election in North Dakota =

- November 5, 2024
- Turnout: 62.61% (▼0.04 pp)

Nominee	Donald Trump	Kamala Harris
Party	Republican	Democratic–NPL
Home state	Florida	California
Running mate	JD Vance	Tim Walz
Electoral vote	3	0
Popular vote	246,505	112,327
Percentage	66.96%	30.51%

Trump
40–50%
50–60%
60–70%
70–80%
80–90%
90–100%
Harris
50–60%
60–70%
70–80%
80–90%
No data
President before election
Joe Biden
Democratic-NPL
Elected President
Donald Trump
Republican

The 2024 United States presidential election in North Dakota took place on Tuesday, November 5, 2024, as part of the 2024 United States presidential election in which all 50 states plus the District of Columbia participated. North Dakota voters chose electors to represent them in the Electoral College via a popular vote. The state of North Dakota has three electoral votes in the Electoral College, following reapportionment due to the 2020 United States census in which the state gained no further congressional seats.

On election night, Trump carried the state with an overwhelming victory margin of 36.45%, the highest out of any Republican presidential victory in the state since 1980. It was Trump's fourth strongest state in margin of victory, behind Idaho, West Virginia and Wyoming. Trump's 66.96% vote share is the largest for any presidential candidate in the state since 1952.

By margin, this was the worst performance by a Democratic presidential nominee in North Dakota since 1980, when Jimmy Carter lost the state by about 38%. Harris lost the state by 36.45%, worse than Hillary Clinton's 35.73% losing margin in 2016.

== Primary elections ==
=== Democratic primary ===
The North Dakota Democratic primary was held mostly through mail in ballots. Limited in-person voting was held, and all ballots were due March 30, 2024.

North Dakota Democratic primary, March 30, 2024
Candidate	Votes	%	Delegates
Joe Biden (incumbent)	840	92.41	13
Marianne Williamson	31	3.41	0
Dean Phillips (withdrawn)	16	1.76	0
Cenk Uygur (withdrawn)	13	1.43	0
Eban Cambridge	4	0.44	0
Stephen Lyons (withdrawn)	3	0.33	0
Jason Palmer	2	0.22	0
Armando Perez-Serrato	0	0.00	0
Total	909	100%	13

=== Republican caucuses ===
The North Dakota Republican caucuses were held on March 4, 2024, one day before Super Tuesday, where 15 states and 865 total delegates were up for election.

North Dakota Republican caucus, March 4, 2024
Candidate	Votes	Percentage	Actual delegate count		
Candidate	Votes	Percentage	Bound	Unbound	Total
Donald Trump	1,632	84.43%	29	0	29
Nikki Haley	273	14.12%	0	0	0
David Stuckenberg	19	0.98%	0	0	0
Ryan Binkley (withdrawn)	9	0.47%	0	0	0
Total:	1,933	100.00%	29	0	29

== General election ==
=== Predictions ===
Source	Ranking	As of
Cook Political Report	Solid R	December 19, 2023
Inside Elections	Solid R	April 26, 2023
Sabato's Crystal Ball	Safe R	June 29, 2023
Decision Desk HQ/The Hill	Safe R	December 14, 2023
CNalysis	Solid R	December 30, 2023
CNN	Solid R	January 14, 2024
The Economist	Safe R	June 12, 2024
538	Solid R	June 11, 2024
RCP	Solid R	June 26, 2024
NBC News	Safe R	October 6, 2024

=== Polling ===
Donald Trump vs. Kamala Harris

Poll source	Date(s) administered	Sample size (Note: Key: A – all adults RV – registered voters LV – likely voters V – unclear)	Margin of error	Donald Trump Republican	Kamala Harris Democratic–NPL	Other / Undecided
Lake Research Partners (D) (Note: Poll sponsored by the campaign of Katrina Christiansen, the Democratic nominee for North Dakota's Class 1 Senate seat)	September 23–26, 2024	500 (LV)	–	50%	40%	10%

Donald Trump vs. Kamala Harris vs. Chase Oliver

Poll source	Date(s) administered	Sample size	Margin of error	Donald Trump Republican	Kamala Harris Democratic–NPL	Chase Oliver Libertarian	Other / Undecided
WPA Intelligence (R) (Note: Poll sponsored by North Dakota News Cooperative)	September 28–30, 2024	500 (LV)	± 4.4%	59%	32%	1%	8%

Hypothetical polling with Donald Trump and Joe Biden

Poll source	Date(s) administered	Sample size	Margin of error	Donald Trump Republican	Joe Biden Democratic–NPL	Other / Undecided
Public Opinion Strategies (R) (Note: Poll sponsored by Brighter Future Alliance)	June 15–19, 2024	500 (LV)	± 4.4%	62%	28%	10%
John Zogby Strategies (Note: Poll conducted for Kennedy's campaign)	April 13–21, 2024	300 (LV)	–	55%	37%	8%
Emerson College	October 1–4, 2023	419 (RV)	± 4.8%	54%	17%	28%

Hypothetical polling with other candidates

Donald Trump vs. Robert F. Kennedy Jr.

Poll source	Date(s) administered	Sample size	Margin of error	Donald Trump Republican	Robert Kennedy Jr. Independent	Other / Undecided
John Zogby Strategies	April 13–21, 2024	300 (LV)	–	51%	36%	13%

Robert F. Kennedy Jr. vs. Joe Biden

Poll source	Date(s) administered	Sample size	Margin of error	Robert Kennedy Jr. Independent	Joe Biden Democratic–NPL	Other / Undecided
John Zogby Strategies	April 13–21, 2024	300 (LV)	–	58%	30%	12%

=== Results ===
State House district results: Trump 50–60% 60–70% 70–80% 80–90% / Harris 40–50% 50–60%

2024 United States presidential election in North Dakota
Party	Candidate	Votes	%	±%
Republican	Donald Trump; JD Vance	246,505	66.96%	▲1.85%
Democratic–NPL	Kamala Harris; Tim Walz	112,327	30.51%	▼1.27%
Libertarian	Chase Oliver; Mike ter Maat	6,227	1.69%	▼0.91%
Write-in		3,096	0.84%	▲0.31%
Total votes		368,155	100.00%	N/A

==== By county ====
County	Donald Trump Republican		Kamala Harris Democratic-NPL		Various candidates Other parties		Margin		Total
County	#	%	#	%	#	%	#	%	Total
Adams	962	80.10%	215	17.90%	24	2.00%	747	62.20%	1,201
Barnes	3,531	66.14%	1,661	31.11%	147	2.75%	1,870	35.03%	5,339
Benson	1,163	58.09%	795	39.71%	44	2.20%	368	18.38%	2,002
Billings	543	83.93%	93	14.37%	11	1.70%	450	69.55%	647
Bottineau	2,628	76.24%	735	21.32%	84	2.44%	1,893	54.92%	3,447
Bowman	1,384	85.54%	207	12.79%	27	1.67%	1,177	72.74%	1,618
Burke	909	86.08%	130	12.31%	17	1.61%	779	73.77%	1,056
Burleigh	36,595	70.02%	14,215	27.20%	1,453	2.78%	22,380	42.82%	52,263
Cass	47,873	52.69%	40,304	44.36%	2,674	2.94%	7,569	8.33%	90,851
Cavalier	1,461	73.53%	491	24.71%	35	1.76%	970	48.82%	1,987
Dickey	1,829	74.56%	557	22.71%	67	2.73%	1,272	51.85%	2,453
Divide	914	76.10%	253	21.07%	34	2.83%	661	55.04%	1,201
Dunn	1,877	83.72%	332	14.81%	33	1.47%	1,545	68.91%	2,242
Eddy	862	71.54%	316	26.22%	27	2.24%	546	45.31%	1,205
Emmons	1,697	87.93%	205	10.62%	28	1.45%	1,492	77.31%	1,930
Foster	1,326	77.86%	335	19.67%	42	2.47%	991	58.19%	1,703
Golden Valley	847	85.47%	122	12.31%	22	2.22%	725	73.16%	991
Grand Forks	18,123	57.70%	12,469	39.70%	819	2.61%	5,654	18.00%	31,411
Grant	1,076	82.39%	205	15.70%	25	1.91%	871	66.69%	1,306
Griggs	963	74.71%	301	23.35%	25	1.94%	662	51.36%	1,289
Hettinger	1,089	83.38%	192	14.70%	25	1.91%	897	68.68%	1,306
Kidder	1,137	81.33%	238	17.02%	23	1.65%	899	64.31%	1,398
LaMoure	1,614	76.02%	453	21.34%	56	2.64%	1,161	54.69%	2,123
Logan	898	86.93%	117	11.33%	18	1.74%	781	75.61%	1,033
McHenry	2,223	80.78%	479	17.41%	50	1.82%	1,744	63.37%	2,752
McIntosh	1,132	81.44%	229	16.47%	29	2.09%	903	64.96%	1,390
McKenzie	4,627	83.81%	809	14.65%	85	1.54%	3,818	69.15%	5,521
McLean	4,231	78.05%	1,093	20.16%	97	1.79%	3,138	57.89%	5,421
Mercer	3,798	83.38%	672	14.75%	85	1.87%	3,126	68.63%	4,555
Morton	12,839	75.36%	3,748	22.00%	449	2.64%	9,091	53.36%	17,036
Mountrail	2,877	70.64%	1,125	27.62%	71	1.74%	1,752	43.01%	4,073
Nelson	1,141	64.79%	580	32.94%	40	2.27%	561	31.86%	1,761
Oliver	909	83.62%	156	14.35%	22	2.02%	753	69.27%	1,087
Pembina	2,350	75.51%	704	22.62%	58	1.86%	1,646	52.89%	3,112
Pierce	1,493	75.79%	439	22.28%	38	1.93%	1,054	53.50%	1,970
Ramsey	3,609	68.89%	1,513	28.88%	117	2.23%	2,096	40.01%	5,239
Ransom	1,661	62.70%	920	34.73%	68	2.57%	741	27.97%	2,649
Renville	993	82.20%	179	14.82%	36	2.98%	814	67.38%	1,208
Richland	5,576	67.50%	2,473	29.94%	212	2.57%	3,103	37.56%	8,261
Rolette	1,427	35.02%	2,567	62.99%	81	1.99%	-1,140	-27.98%	4,075
Sargent	1,325	64.86%	663	32.45%	55	2.69%	662	32.40%	2,043
Sheridan	644	85.07%	101	13.34%	12	1.59%	543	71.73%	757
Sioux	285	29.91%	654	68.63%	14	1.47%	-369	-38.72%	953
Slope	351	90.23%	33	8.48%	5	1.29%	318	81.75%	389
Stark	12,323	81.61%	2,473	16.38%	304	2.01%	9,850	65.23%	15,100
Steele	622	61.28%	367	36.16%	26	2.56%	255	25.12%	1,015
Stutsman	7,185	70.90%	2,692	26.56%	257	2.54%	4,493	44.34%	10,134
Towner	796	71.45%	289	25.94%	29	2.60%	507	45.51%	1,114
Traill	2,650	64.40%	1,359	33.03%	106	2.58%	1,291	31.37%	4,115
Walsh	3,186	70.86%	1,173	26.09%	137	3.05%	2,013	44.77%	4,496
Ward	20,635	72.27%	7,215	25.27%	702	2.46%	13,420	47.00%	28,552
Wells	1,815	80.56%	405	17.98%	33	1.46%	1,410	62.58%	2,253
Williams	12,501	82.67%	2,276	15.05%	345	2.28%	10,225	67.62%	15,122
Totals	246,505	66.96%	112,327	30.51%	9,323	2.53%	134,178	36.45%	368,155

==== By congressional district ====
Due to the state's low population, only one congressional district is allocated. This district is an at-large district, because it covers the entire state, and thus is equivalent to the statewide election results.

District	Trump	Harris	Representative
At-large	66.96%	30.51%	Julie Fedorchak

== Analysis ==
A sparsely populated Great Plains state with a predominantly White populace and electorate, North Dakota has not voted for a Democratic presidential candidate since Lyndon B. Johnson won it in his nationwide 1964 landslide. Furthermore, it has only been decided by single digits in three presidential elections since 1964: 1976, 1996, and 2008. Agribusiness and the recent oil boom have played a key role in cementing the GOP's overwhelming dominance in the state.

North Dakota has one of the highest percentage of Native Americans in the country, a constituency that has been relatively solidly Democratic in the past. In 2024, however, Native Americans shifted heavily to the right, with North Dakota's Native population following that trend. Sioux County, North Dakota's most Native American county, shifted harder to the right than any county in the state.

North Dakota is considered a deeply red state, and Republican nominee and former president Donald Trump won it by over 30 percentage points in both 2016 and 2020. In terms of popular vote percentage, North Dakota was Libertarian candidate Chase Oliver's strongest state, with 1.7 percent.

== See also ==
- United States presidential elections in North Dakota
- 2024 United States presidential election
- 2024 Democratic Party presidential primaries
- 2024 Republican Party presidential primaries
- 2024 United States elections

== Notes ==
Partisan clients
