= 1984 United States presidential election in North Dakota =

- November 6, 1984

Nominee	Ronald Reagan	Walter Mondale
Party	Republican	Democratic–NPL
Home state	California	Minnesota
Running mate	George H. W. Bush	Geraldine Ferraro
Electoral vote	3	0
Popular vote	200,336	104,429
Percentage	64.84%	33.80%
County results
Reagan
50–60%
60–70%
70–80%
80–90%
Mondale
50–60%
President before election
Ronald Reagan
Republican
Elected President
Ronald Reagan
Republican

The 1984 United States presidential election in North Dakota took place on November 6, 1984. All 50 states and the District of Columbia, were part of the 1984 United States presidential election. State voters chose three electors to the Electoral College, which selected the president and vice president of the United States. North Dakota was won by incumbent United States President Ronald Reagan of California, who was running against former Vice President Walter Mondale of Minnesota. Reagan ran for a second time with former C.I.A. Director George H. W. Bush of Texas, and Mondale ran with Representative Geraldine Ferraro of New York, the first major female candidate for the vice presidency.

The presidential election of 1984 was a very partisan election for North Dakota, with over 98% of the electorate voting for either the Democratic or Republican parties, though several parties appeared on the ballot. Every county gave either Mondale or Reagan a majority; the vast majority—all but two—gave Reagan a majority. Reagan's best county was McIntosh County, where he got 81.5% of the vote; Mondale's was Sioux County, where he got 58.6% of the vote. Reagan exceeded 70% in 15 counties, including Stark (Dickinson), the state's seventh-largest at the time.

North Dakota weighed in for this election as 13% more Republican than the national average. Reagan won North Dakota by a landslide 31-point margin. His 64.84% vote share made it his twelfth-best state. He carried every county in the state save the majority Native American counties of Sioux and Rolette; he had previously carried Sioux County in 1980. He performed well in both the more populous counties—earning over 60% of the vote in Cass County (Fargo) and Grand Forks County (Grand Forks), and over 2/3 of the vote in Burleigh County (Bismarck) and Ward County (Minot)--as well as in its more rural areas. In only eight counties (including the two he lost) did his vote share even dip below his national share of 58.8%, and in only two (Sargent and Benson) was the margin less than 5%. None of these counties cast more than 4,000 votes.

Apart from its vote for Woodrow Wilson in 1912, the election where the Republican Party was badly split between Theodore Roosevelt's progressive Bull Moose Party and William Howard Taft's conservative supporters; the nationally close election of 1916 and its vote for Populist James Weaver in 1892, North Dakota has been a typically Republican state since its admittance in 1889. Indeed, no Republican has won the White House without North Dakota since its admittance to the Union. Alone amongst the free-soil Plains West states, it resisted the appeal of William Jennings Bryan in 1896, and was Warren Harding's best state in 1920. Even so, Reagan's victory in the state was one of the stronger ones compared to other recent Republican landslide winners. His vote share exceeded, for example, Nixon's in 1972 and Eisenhower's in 1956 (although not Eisenhower's in 1952). Reagan's particularly strong appeal in the Flickertail State was first on display in 1980, when Reagan exceeded his national vote share by over 10% in the state (already exceeding the vote shares won by both Nixon in 1972 and Eisenhower in 1956). Reagan's 64.84% vote share would remain unsurpassed until 2020, when Donald Trump received 65.11% in the state. Even so, North Dakota was the state that trended most strongly Democratic in 1984, as Mondale lost the state by 7% less than Carter had done in 1980.

For the 16th election in a row, North Dakota voted the same as the other three free-soil Plains West states (South Dakota, Nebraska, and Kansas). Since the Dakotas were admitted to the Union in 1889, the four states have disagreed only in 1892, 1896, 1912, and 1916. This region has been a stronghold for the Republican Party since shortly after its founding and, aside from partial flirtations with Bryan and Wilson, has remained so ever since.

== Results ==
1984 United States presidential election in North Dakota
Party	Candidate	Votes	Percentage	Electoral votes
Republican	Ronald Reagan (incumbent)	200,336	64.84%	3
Democratic-NPL	Walter Mondale	104,429	33.80%	0
Independent	Lyndon LaRouche	1,278	0.41%	0
America First	Bob Richards	1,077	0.35%	0
Libertarian	David Bergland	703	0.23%	0
Citizen's Party	Sonia Johnson	368	0.12%	0
Socialist Workers Party	Melvin Mason	239	0.08%	0
Prohibition	Earl Dodge	220	0.07%	0
Communist Party	Gus Hall	169	0.05%	0
New Alliance Party	Dennis Serrette	152	0.05%	0
Totals		308,971	100.00%	3

=== Results by county ===
County	Ronald Reagan Republican		Walter Mondale Democratic-NPL		Lyndon LaRouche Independent		Bob Richards America First		David Bergland Libertarian		Various candidates Other parties		Margin		Total votes cast
County	#	%	#	%	#	%	#	%	#	%	#	%	#	%	Total votes cast
Adams	1,343	70.68%	530	27.89%	17	0.89%	5	0.26%	3	0.16%	2	0.11%	813	42.79%	1,900
Barnes	4,348	62.79%	2,507	36.20%	18	0.26%	20	0.29%	10	0.14%	22	0.32%	1,841	26.59%	6,925
Benson	1,729	51.41%	1,599	47.55%	17	0.51%	5	0.15%	5	0.15%	8	0.24%	130	3.86%	3,363
Billings	505	77.34%	133	20.37%	5	0.77%	8	1.23%	1	0.15%	1	0.15%	372	56.97%	653
Bottineau	3,356	71.59%	1,279	27.28%	24	0.51%	12	0.26%	6	0.13%	11	0.23%	2,077	44.31%	4,688
Bowman	1,559	72.55%	562	26.15%	12	0.56%	6	0.28%	1	0.05%	9	0.42%	997	46.40%	2,149
Burke	1,298	69.45%	543	29.05%	11	0.59%	14	0.75%	2	0.11%	1	0.05%	755	40.40%	1,869
Burleigh	19,913	68.25%	8,781	30.10%	149	0.51%	135	0.46%	77	0.26%	121	0.41%	11,132	38.15%	29,176
Cass	29,221	61.35%	18,054	37.91%	89	0.19%	40	0.08%	121	0.25%	104	0.22%	11,167	23.44%	47,629
Cavalier	2,661	69.95%	1,110	29.18%	13	0.34%	9	0.24%	4	0.11%	7	0.18%	1,551	40.77%	3,804
Dickey	2,460	69.37%	1,051	29.64%	18	0.51%	5	0.14%	2	0.06%	10	0.28%	1,409	39.73%	3,546
Divide	1,165	63.32%	626	34.02%	39	2.12%	6	0.33%	1	0.05%	3	0.16%	539	29.30%	1,840
Dunn	1,583	68.12%	716	30.81%	10	0.43%	9	0.39%	1	0.04%	5	0.22%	867	37.31%	2,324
Eddy	1,049	56.40%	796	42.80%	4	0.22%	1	0.05%	8	0.43%	2	0.11%	253	13.60%	1,860
Emmons	1,885	73.46%	620	24.16%	24	0.94%	21	0.82%	2	0.08%	14	0.55%	1,265	49.30%	2,566
Foster	1,422	64.23%	765	34.55%	13	0.59%	3	0.14%	4	0.18%	7	0.32%	657	29.68%	2,214
Golden Valley	964	73.09%	325	24.64%	17	1.29%	5	0.38%	4	0.30%	4	0.30%	639	48.45%	1,319
Grand Forks	15,898	60.70%	10,050	38.37%	52	0.20%	33	0.13%	85	0.32%	73	0.28%	5,848	22.33%	26,191
Grant	1,607	74.92%	507	23.64%	19	0.89%	2	0.09%	4	0.19%	6	0.28%	1,100	51.28%	2,145
Griggs	1,254	59.89%	828	39.54%	2	0.10%	3	0.14%	4	0.19%	3	0.14%	426	20.35%	2,094
Hettinger	1,646	74.75%	524	23.80%	17	0.77%	7	0.32%	2	0.09%	6	0.27%	1,122	50.95%	2,202
Kidder	1,240	68.62%	506	28.00%	11	0.61%	39	2.16%	2	0.11%	9	0.50%	734	40.62%	1,807
LaMoure	1,978	63.64%	1,086	34.94%	15	0.48%	7	0.23%	6	0.19%	16	0.51%	892	28.70%	3,108
Logan	1,222	72.91%	401	23.93%	3	0.18%	41	2.45%	2	0.12%	7	0.42%	821	48.98%	1,676
McHenry	2,485	65.38%	1,283	33.75%	19	0.50%	10	0.26%	2	0.05%	2	0.05%	1,202	31.63%	3,801
McIntosh	2,047	81.46%	427	16.99%	12	0.48%	8	0.32%	1	0.04%	18	0.72%	1,620	64.47%	2,513
McKenzie	2,610	71.96%	974	26.85%	15	0.41%	9	0.25%	14	0.39%	5	0.14%	1,636	45.11%	3,627
McLean	3,673	62.82%	2,062	35.27%	30	0.51%	44	0.75%	11	0.19%	27	0.46%	1,611	27.55%	5,847
Mercer	3,705	67.24%	1,729	31.38%	28	0.51%	24	0.44%	11	0.20%	13	0.24%	1,976	35.86%	5,510
Morton	7,146	62.93%	3,996	35.19%	61	0.54%	70	0.62%	19	0.17%	64	0.56%	3,150	27.74%	11,356
Mountrail	1,959	55.11%	1,565	44.02%	17	0.48%	4	0.11%	3	0.08%	7	0.20%	394	11.09%	3,555
Nelson	1,445	57.50%	1,026	40.83%	10	0.40%	14	0.56%	9	0.36%	9	0.36%	419	16.67%	2,513
Oliver	915	67.43%	419	30.88%	8	0.59%	6	0.44%	2	0.15%	7	0.52%	496	36.55%	1,357
Pembina	2,895	65.99%	1,367	31.16%	24	0.55%	58	1.32%	29	0.66%	14	0.32%	1,528	34.83%	4,387
Pierce	1,883	71.71%	691	26.31%	18	0.69%	16	0.61%	6	0.23%	12	0.46%	1,192	45.40%	2,626
Ramsey	4,150	63.33%	2,304	35.16%	34	0.52%	16	0.24%	15	0.23%	34	0.52%	1,846	28.17%	6,553
Ransom	1,706	59.38%	1,122	39.05%	11	0.38%	5	0.17%	8	0.28%	21	0.73%	584	20.33%	2,873
Renville	1,163	65.56%	592	33.37%	13	0.73%	4	0.23%	1	0.06%	1	0.06%	571	32.19%	1,774
Richland	5,980	65.48%	3,047	33.36%	27	0.30%	36	0.39%	13	0.14%	30	0.33%	2,933	32.12%	9,133
Rolette	1,479	39.43%	2,179	58.09%	22	0.59%	25	0.67%	14	0.37%	32	0.85%	-700	-18.66%	3,751
Sargent	1,385	50.83%	1,295	47.52%	17	0.62%	7	0.26%	2	0.07%	19	0.70%	90	3.31%	2,725
Sheridan	1,075	77.01%	306	21.92%	8	0.57%	3	0.21%	2	0.14%	2	0.14%	769	55.09%	1,396
Sioux	442	39.53%	655	58.59%	12	1.07%	3	0.27%	2	0.18%	4	0.36%	-213	-19.06%	1,118
Slope	419	69.26%	174	28.76%	4	0.66%	7	1.16%	1	0.17%	0	0.00%	245	40.50%	605
Stark	7,641	71.15%	2,759	25.69%	63	0.59%	63	0.59%	47	0.44%	167	1.55%	4,882	45.46%	10,740
Steele	941	54.08%	781	44.89%	6	0.34%	3	0.17%	4	0.23%	5	0.29%	160	9.19%	1,740
Stutsman	6,591	64.57%	3,495	34.24%	30	0.29%	40	0.39%	20	0.20%	32	0.31%	3,096	30.33%	10,208
Towner	1,242	60.15%	789	38.21%	10	0.48%	14	0.68%	5	0.24%	5	0.24%	453	21.94%	2,065
Traill	3,037	64.70%	1,580	33.66%	21	0.45%	28	0.60%	12	0.26%	16	0.34%	1,457	31.04%	4,694
Walsh	4,347	64.84%	2,264	33.77%	26	0.39%	13	0.19%	22	0.33%	32	0.48%	2,083	31.07%	6,704
Ward	16,077	68.06%	7,336	31.05%	75	0.32%	57	0.24%	32	0.14%	46	0.19%	8,741	37.01%	23,623
Wells	2,426	69.20%	1,036	29.55%	17	0.48%	20	0.57%	2	0.06%	5	0.14%	1,390	39.65%	3,506
Williams	8,166	70.87%	3,177	27.57%	41	0.36%	36	0.31%	42	0.36%	61	0.53%	4,989	43.30%	11,523
Totals	200,336	64.84%	104,429	33.80%	1,278	0.41%	1,077	0.35%	703	0.23%	1,148	0.37%	95,907	31.04%	308,971

==== Counties that flipped from Republican to Democratic ====
- Sioux

== See also ==
- United States presidential elections in North Dakota
- Presidency of Ronald Reagan
