= United States presidential elections in North Dakota =

Presidential elections in North Dakota
- Number of elections: 34
- Voted Democratic: 5
- Voted Republican: 28
- Voted other: 1 (Note: James B. Weaver, 1892.)
- Voted for winning candidate: 23
- Voted for losing candidate: 11

Following is a table of United States presidential elections in North Dakota, ordered by year. Since its admission to statehood in 1889, North Dakota has participated in every U.S. presidential election.

Winners of the state are in bold. The shading refers to the state winner, and not the national winner.

View source data.

Year	Winner (nationally)	Votes	Percent	Runner-up (nationally)	Votes	Percent	Other national candidates (Note: For purposes of these lists, other national candidates are defined as those who won at least one electoral vote, or won at least ten percent of the vote in multiple states.)	Votes	Percent	Electoral votes	Notes
2024	**Donald Trump**	246,505	66.96	Kamala Harris	112,327	30.51	__			3	
2020	Joe Biden	114,902	31.76	**Donald Trump**	235,595	65.11	—			3	
2016	**Donald Trump** (Note: Won the electoral college while losing the popular vote)	216,794	62.96	Hillary Clinton	93,758	27.23	__			3	
2012	Barack Obama	124,827	38.69	**Mitt Romney**	188,163	58.32	—			3	
2008	Barack Obama	141,278	44.62	**John McCain**	168,601	53.25	—			3	
2004	**George W. Bush**	196,651	62.86	John Kerry	111,052	35.5	—			3	
2000	**George W. Bush**	174,852	60.66	Al Gore	95,284	33.06	—			3	
1996	Bill Clinton	106,905	40.13	**Bob Dole**	125,050	46.94	Ross Perot	32,515	12.2	3	
1992	Bill Clinton	99,168	32.18	**George H. W. Bush**	136,244	44.22	Ross Perot	71,084	23.07	3	
1988	**George H. W. Bush**	166,559	56.03	Michael Dukakis	127,739	42.97	—			3	
1984	**Ronald Reagan**	200,336	64.84	Walter Mondale	104,429	33.8	—			3	
1980	**Ronald Reagan**	193,695	64.23	Jimmy Carter	79,189	26.26	John B. Anderson	23,640	7.84	3	
1976	Jimmy Carter	136,078	45.80	**Gerald Ford**	153,470	51.66	—			3	
1972	**Richard Nixon**	174,109	62.07	George McGovern	100,384	35.79	—			3	
1968	**Richard Nixon**	138,669	55.94	Hubert Humphrey	94,769	38.23	George Wallace	14,244	5.75	4	
1964	**Lyndon B. Johnson**	149,784	57.97	Barry Goldwater	108,207	41.88	—			4	
1960	John F. Kennedy	123,963	44.52	**Richard Nixon**	154,310	55.42	—			4	
1956	**Dwight D. Eisenhower**	156,766	61.72	Adlai Stevenson II	96,742	38.09	T. Coleman Andrews/ Unpledged Electors (Note: Was allied with a slate of unpledged electors in Louisiana, Mississippi and South Carolina)	483	0.19	4	
1952	**Dwight D. Eisenhower**	191,712	70.97	Adlai Stevenson II	76,694	28.39	—			4	
1948	Harry S. Truman	95,812	43.41	**Thomas E. Dewey**	115,139	52.17	Strom Thurmond	374	0.17	4	
1944	Franklin D. Roosevelt	100,144	45.48	**Thomas E. Dewey**	118,535	53.84	—			4	
1940	Franklin D. Roosevelt	124,036	44.18	**Wendell Willkie**	154,590	55.06	—			4	
1936	**Franklin D. Roosevelt**	163,148	59.60	Alf Landon	72,751	26.58	—			4	
1932	**Franklin D. Roosevelt**	178,350	69.59	Herbert Hoover	71,772	28	—			4	
1928	**Herbert Hoover**	131,441	54.80	Al Smith	106,648	44.46	—			5	
1924	**Calvin Coolidge**	94,931	47.68	John W. Davis	13,858	6.96	Robert M. La Follette	89,922	45.17	5	
1920	**Warren G. Harding**	160,072	77.79	James M. Cox	37,422	18.19	Parley P. Christensen	—	—	5	
1916	**Woodrow Wilson**	55,206	47.84	Charles E. Hughes	53,471	46.34	—			5	
1912	**Woodrow Wilson**	29,555	34.14	Theodore Roosevelt	25,726	29.71	William H. Taft	23,090	26.67	5	
1908	**William H. Taft**	57,680	61.02	William Jennings Bryan	32,885	34.79	—			4	
1904	**Theodore Roosevelt**	52,595	75.12	Alton B. Parker	14,273	20.39	—			4	
1900	**William McKinley**	35,898	62.12	William Jennings Bryan	20,531	35.53	—			3	
1896	**William McKinley**	26,335	55.57	William Jennings Bryan	20,686	43.65	—			3	
1892	Grover Cleveland	0	0	Benjamin Harrison	17,519	48.50	**James B. Weaver**	17,700	49.01	3	Electoral votes split three ways.

== See also ==
- Elections in North Dakota
