= Sioux County, North Dakota =

County in North Dakota, United States

- County
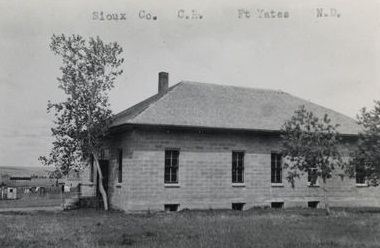
- Postcard. Historic Sioux County Courthouse at Fort Yates, North Dakota.

- Location within the U.S. state of North Dakota
- Coordinates: 46.110618°N 101.061284°W
- Country: United States
- State: North Dakota
- Founded: September 3, 1914 (created); September 12, 1914 (organized)
- Named for: Sioux people
- Seat: Fort Yates
- Largest community: Cannon Ball

Area
  - Total: 1,128.203 sq mi (2,922.03 km^{2})
  - Land: 1,094.052 sq mi (2,833.58 km^{2})
  - Water: 34.151 sq mi (88.45 km^{2}) 3.03%

Population (2020)
  - Total: 3,898
  - Estimate (2025): 3,667 ▼
  - Density: 3.393/sq mi (1.310/km^{2})

Time zones
- (eastern portion): UTC−6 (Central)
  - Summer (DST): UTC−5 (CDT)
- (western portion): UTC−7 (Mountain)
  - Summer (DST): UTC−6 (MDT)
- Area code: 701
- Congressional district: At-large

Sioux County is a county located along the southern border of the U.S. state of North Dakota. As of the 2020 census, the population was 3,898, and was estimated to be 3,667 in 2025. Its eastern border is the Missouri River and the county seat is Fort Yates.

== History ==
The county was created by proclamation of Governor Louis B. Hanna on September 3, 1914. It was named for the Native American Lakota, whose historic territory included this area. The county government organization was completed on September 12 of that year. The county lies entirely within the Standing Rock Sioux Reservation, forming the northernmost 30 percent of the reservation; the balance of the reservation is in South Dakota. It is the only county in North Dakota that is entirely within an Indian reservation. From 2013 to 2018, Sioux County was included in the Bismarck, ND Metropolitan Statistical Area.

== Geography ==
Sioux County lies on the south line of North Dakota. Its south boundary line abuts the north boundary line of the state of South Dakota. Its north boundary line is formed by the east-northeastward-flowing Cedar Creek, which discharges into the Missouri River at the county's northeast corner, and its east boundary line is formed by the south-southeast-flowing Missouri River, which also forms Lake Oahe along the county boundary line. Porcupine Creek flows southeastward into the Missouri River, draining the northeastern part of the county. The county terrain consists of low rolling hills etched with gullies and drainages; the area is mostly devoted to agriculture. The terrain slopes to the east and south; its highest point is on the west line, near the southwestern corner of the county, at 2,602 ft (793 m) ASL.

According to the United States Census Bureau, the county has a total area of 1,128.203 square miles (2,922.03 km^{2}), of which 1,094.052 square miles (2,833.58 km^{2}) is land and 34.151 square miles (88.45 km^{2}) (3.03%) is water. It is the 34th largest county in North Dakota by total area.

The southwest corner counties of North Dakota (Adams, Billings, Bowman, Golden Valley, Grant, Hettinger, Slope, and Stark) observe Mountain Time. The counties of McKenzie, Dunn, and Sioux are split, observing Mountain Time in their western portions.

=== Major highways ===
- North Dakota Highway 6
- North Dakota Highway 24
- North Dakota Highway 31
- North Dakota Highway 49
- North Dakota Highway 1806

=== Adjacent counties ===
- Morton County - north (observes Central Time)
- Emmons County - east (observes Central Time)
- Corson County, South Dakota - south (observes Mountain Time)
- Adams County - west (observes Mountain Time)
- Grant County - northwest (observes Mountain Time)

=== Protected areas ===
- Cedar River National Grassland (part)
- Froelich Dam State Game Management Area

== Demographics ==
Historical population
Census	Pop.	Note	%±
1920	3,308		—
1930	4,687		41.7%
1940	4,419		−5.7%
1950	3,696		−16.4%
1960	3,662		−0.9%
1970	3,632		−0.8%
1980	3,620		−0.3%
1990	3,761		3.9%
2000	4,044		7.5%
2010	4,153		2.7%
2020	3,898		−6.1%
2025 (est.)	3,667	▼	−5.9%
U.S. Decennial Census; 1790–1960 1900–1990; 1990–2000 2010–2020

=== Recent estimates ===
As of the fourth quarter of 2024, the median home value in Sioux County was $92,605.

As of the 2023 American Community Survey, there are 1,067 estimated households in Sioux County with an average of 3.50 persons per household. The county has a median household income of $41,676. Approximately 34.9% of the county's population lives at or below the poverty line. Sioux County has an estimated 50.9% employment rate, with 11.2% of the population holding a bachelor's degree or higher and 86.9% holding a high school diploma.

The top five reported ancestries (people were allowed to report up to two ancestries, thus the figures will generally add to more than 100%) were English (92.7%), Spanish (0.3%), Indo-European (0.2%), Asian and Pacific Islander (0.0%), and Other (6.7%).

=== Race and ethnicity ===
Sioux County, North Dakota – racial and ethnic composition
Note: the US Census treats Hispanic/Latino as an ethnic category. This table excludes Latinos from the racial categories and assigns them to a separate category. Hispanics/Latinos may be of any race.

Race / ethnicity (NH = non-Hispanic)	Pop. 1980	Pop. 1990	Pop. 2000	Pop. 2010	Pop. 2020
White alone (NH)	1,265 (34.94%)	905 (24.06%)	577 (14.27%)	517 (12.45%)	401 (10.29%)
Black or African American alone (NH)	0 (0.00%)	3 (0.08%)	1 (0.02%)	6 (0.14%)	3 (0.08%)
Native American or Alaska Native alone (NH)	2,329 (64.34%)	2,812 (74.77%)	3,365 (83.21%)	3,433 (82.66%)	3,281 (84.17%)
Asian alone (NH)	5 (0.14%)	12 (0.32%)	1 (0.02%)	4 (0.10%)	2 (0.05%)
Pacific Islander alone (NH)	—	—	2 (0.05%)	0 (0.00%)	0 (0.00%)
Other race alone (NH)	0 (0.00%)	0 (0.00%)	0 (0.00%)	0 (0.00%)	0 (0.00%)
Mixed race or multiracial (NH)	—	—	33 (0.82%)	111 (2.67%)	148 (3.80%)
Hispanic or Latino (any race)	21 (0.58%)	29 (0.77%)	65 (1.61%)	82 (1.97%)	63 (1.62%)
Total	3,620 (100.00%)	3,761 (100.00%)	4,044 (100.00%)	4,153 (100.00%)	3,898 (100.00%)

=== 2020 census ===
As of the 2020 census, there were 3,898 people, 1,103 households, and 791 families residing in the county. The population density was 3.6 inhabitants per square mile (1.4/km^{2}). There were 1,277 housing units at an average density of 1.2 per square mile (0.5/km^{2}).

Of the residents, 34.7% were under the age of 18 and 9.9% were 65 years of age or older; the median age was 29.9 years. For every 100 females there were 102.9 males, and for every 100 females age 18 and over there were 101.6 males.

The racial makeup of the county was 10.3% White, 0.1% African American, 85.5% American Indian and Alaska Native, 0.1% Asian, 0.1% from some other race, and 4.0% from two or more races. Hispanic or Latino residents of any race comprised 1.6% of the population.

There were 1,103 households in the county, of which 47.0% had children under the age of 18 living with them and 35.1% had a female householder with no spouse or partner present. About 21.4% of all households were made up of individuals and 6.5% had someone living alone who was 65 years of age or older. Of the 1,277 housing units, 13.6% were vacant; of the occupied units, 46.7% were owner-occupied and 53.3% were renter-occupied. The homeowner vacancy rate was 0.4% and the rental vacancy rate was 6.9%.

=== 2010 census ===
As of the 2010 census, there were 4,153 people, 1,158 households, and 900 families in the county. The population density was 3.8 inhabitants per square mile (1.5/km^{2}). There were 1,311 housing units at an average density of 1.2 per square mile (0.5/km^{2}). The racial makeup of the county was 12.64% White, 0.17% African American, 84.08% Native American, 0.10% Asian, 0.05% Pacific Islander, 0.10% from some other races and 2.87% from two or more races. Hispanic or Latino people of any race were 1.61% of the population. In terms of ancestry, 13.5% were German, and 0.3% were American.

Of the 1,158 households, 54.1% had children under the age of 18 living with them, 32.5% were married couples living together, 31.6% had a female householder with no husband present, 22.3% were non-families, and 17.4% of all households were made up of individuals. The average household size was 3.55 and the average family size was 3.89. The median age was 26.3 years.

The median income for a household in the county was $30,990 and the median income for a family was $31,098. Males had a median income of $31,894 versus $26,619 for females. The per capita income for the county was $13,542. About 39.0% of families and 47.2% of the population were below the poverty line, including 58.4% of those under age 18 and 36.1% of those age 65 or over.

== Communities ==
=== Cities ===
- Fort Yates (county seat)
- Selfridge
- Solen

=== Census-designated places ===
- Cannon Ball
- Porcupine

=== Township ===
- Menz

== Politics ==
With its population being mostly Native American, Sioux County is one of the most consistently Democratic counties in North Dakota, having last backed a Republican presidential candidate in 1980. Since then the closest a Republican has gotten to winning the county was Ronald Reagan in 1984 who lost the county by 19 percent. John Hoeven, in his 2010 election to the Senate, as well as his 2008 reelection as governor, won the county. In 2016, Hillary Clinton won the most votes in Sioux County, one of only two counties she won in the state. Green Party candidate Jill Stein received 10.4% of the popular vote.

United States presidential election results for Sioux County, North Dakota
Year	Republican		Democratic		Third party(ies)	
Year	No.	%	No.	%	No.	%
1916	232	50.11%	200	43.20%	31	6.70%
1920	776	80.75%	163	16.96%	22	2.29%
1924	777	62.21%	58	4.64%	414	33.15%
1928	687	40.46%	988	58.19%	23	1.35%
1932	350	20.33%	1,328	77.12%	44	2.56%
1936	585	35.16%	877	52.70%	202	12.14%
1940	1,167	66.84%	578	33.10%	1	0.06%
1944	673	59.98%	445	39.66%	4	0.36%
1948	667	57.20%	465	39.88%	34	2.92%
1952	968	73.22%	336	25.42%	18	1.36%
1956	718	59.98%	476	39.77%	3	0.25%
1960	571	45.35%	688	54.65%	0	0.00%
1964	314	31.00%	695	68.61%	4	0.39%
1968	482	45.26%	525	49.30%	58	5.45%
1972	561	49.12%	557	48.77%	24	2.10%
1976	354	32.75%	697	64.48%	30	2.78%
1980	620	56.88%	383	35.14%	87	7.98%
1984	442	39.53%	655	58.59%	21	1.88%
1988	325	31.19%	701	67.27%	16	1.54%
1992	264	26.83%	463	47.05%	257	26.12%
1996	207	30.00%	393	56.96%	90	13.04%
2000	269	25.84%	724	69.55%	48	4.61%
2004	319	27.98%	804	70.53%	17	1.49%
2008	215	15.60%	1,145	83.09%	18	1.31%
2012	225	19.67%	900	78.67%	19	1.66%
2016	260	21.10%	758	61.53%	214	17.37%
2020	258	21.75%	804	67.79%	124	10.46%
2024	285	29.91%	654	68.63%	14	1.47%

== Education ==
School districts include:

- Fort Yates Public School District 4 (in cooperation with the Standing Rock Bureau of Indian Education (BIE) grant school)
- Selfridge Public School District 8
- Solen Public School District 3

== See also ==
- National Register of Historic Places listings in Sioux County, North Dakota
