= 1956 United States presidential election in North Dakota =

- November 6, 1956

All 4 North Dakota votes to the Electoral College

Nominee	Dwight D. Eisenhower	Adlai Stevenson
Party	Republican	Democratic-NPL
Home state	Pennsylvania (Note: Although he was born in Texas and grew up in Kansas before his military career, at the time of the 1952 election Eisenhower was president of Columbia University and was, officially, a resident of New York. During his first term as president, he moved his private residence to Gettysburg, Pennsylvania, and officially changed his residency to Pennsylvania.)	Illinois
Running mate	Richard Nixon	Estes Kefauver
Electoral vote	4	0
Popular vote	156,766	96,742
Percentage	61.72%	38.09%
County results
Eisenhower
50–60%
60–70%
70–80%
80–90%
Stevenson
50–60%
President before election
Dwight D. Eisenhower
Republican
Elected President
Dwight D. Eisenhower
Republican

The 1956 United States presidential election in North Dakota took place on November 6, 1956, as part of the 1956 United States presidential election. Voters chose four representatives, or electors, to the Electoral College, who voted for president and vice president.

North Dakota was won by incumbent President Dwight D. Eisenhower (R–Pennsylvania), running with Vice President Richard Nixon, with 61.72% of the popular vote, against Adlai Stevenson (D–Illinois), running with Tennessee Senator Estes Kefauver, with 38.09% of the popular vote.

== Results ==
1956 United States presidential election in North Dakota
Party	Candidate	Votes	%
Republican	Dwight D. Eisenhower (inc.)	156,766	61.72%
Democratic–NPL	Adlai Stevenson	96,742	38.09%
For America	T. Coleman Andrews	483	0.19%
Total votes		253,991	100%

=== Results by county ===
County	Dwight D. Eisenhower Republican		Adlai Stevenson Democratic-NPL		T. Coleman Andrews For America		Margin		Total votes cast
County	#	%	#	%	#	%	#	%	Total votes cast
Adams	1,338	64.86%	723	35.05%	2	0.10%	615	29.81%	2,063
Barnes	4,475	61.99%	2,730	37.82%	14	0.19%	1,745	24.17%	7,219
Benson	2,340	55.67%	1,851	44.04%	12	0.29%	489	11.63%	4,203
Billings	437	63.43%	248	35.99%	4	0.58%	189	27.44%	689
Bottineau	2,923	62.91%	1,718	36.98%	5	0.11%	1,205	25.93%	4,646
Bowman	1,007	58.34%	715	41.43%	4	0.23%	292	16.91%	1,726
Burke	1,415	59.98%	936	39.68%	8	0.34%	479	20.30%	2,359
Burleigh	9,199	73.79%	3,231	25.92%	37	0.30%	5,968	47.87%	12,467
Cass	16,932	63.25%	9,821	36.69%	17	0.06%	7,111	26.56%	26,770
Cavalier	2,450	57.04%	1,836	42.75%	9	0.21%	614	14.29%	4,295
Dickey	2,327	61.72%	1,435	38.06%	8	0.21%	892	23.66%	3,770
Divide	1,296	51.99%	1,194	47.89%	3	0.12%	102	4.10%	2,493
Dunn	1,567	59.63%	1,055	40.14%	6	0.23%	512	19.49%	2,628
Eddy	1,239	56.01%	973	43.99%	0	0.00%	266	12.02%	2,212
Emmons	2,789	77.11%	825	22.81%	3	0.08%	1,964	54.30%	3,617
Foster	1,234	53.51%	1,062	46.05%	10	0.43%	172	7.46%	2,306
Golden Valley	824	58.98%	567	40.59%	6	0.43%	257	18.39%	1,397
Grand Forks	10,289	62.17%	6,231	37.65%	30	0.18%	4,058	24.52%	16,550
Grant	1,872	72.03%	718	27.63%	9	0.35%	1,154	44.40%	2,599
Griggs	1,212	50.78%	1,173	49.14%	2	0.08%	39	1.64%	2,387
Hettinger	1,882	70.17%	796	29.68%	4	0.15%	1,086	40.49%	2,682
Kidder	1,523	68.08%	708	31.65%	6	0.27%	815	36.43%	2,237
LaMoure	2,433	58.85%	1,694	40.98%	7	0.17%	739	17.87%	4,134
Logan	1,807	76.63%	547	23.20%	4	0.17%	1,260	53.43%	2,358
McHenry	3,019	62.12%	1,825	37.55%	16	0.33%	1,194	24.57%	4,860
McIntosh	2,689	84.22%	498	15.60%	6	0.19%	2,191	68.62%	3,193
McKenzie	1,609	53.15%	1,405	46.42%	13	0.43%	204	6.73%	3,027
McLean	3,653	58.17%	2,609	41.54%	18	0.29%	1,044	16.63%	6,280
Mercer	2,555	79.18%	666	20.64%	6	0.19%	1,889	58.54%	3,227
Morton	5,232	66.31%	2,628	33.31%	30	0.38%	2,604	33.00%	7,890
Mountrail	1,699	47.23%	1,891	52.57%	7	0.19%	-192	-5.34%	3,597
Nelson	1,821	50.35%	1,794	49.60%	2	0.06%	27	0.75%	3,617
Oliver	788	73.03%	279	25.86%	12	1.11%	509	47.17%	1,079
Pembina	3,077	61.82%	1,887	37.91%	13	0.26%	1,190	23.91%	4,977
Pierce	1,997	59.75%	1,340	40.10%	5	0.15%	657	19.65%	3,342
Ramsey	3,821	64.44%	2,103	35.46%	6	0.10%	1,718	28.98%	5,930
Ransom	2,361	56.56%	1,808	43.32%	5	0.12%	553	13.24%	4,174
Renville	1,035	50.22%	1,025	49.73%	1	0.05%	10	0.49%	2,061
Richland	4,971	60.96%	3,171	38.89%	12	0.15%	1,800	22.07%	8,154
Rolette	1,444	45.44%	1,728	54.37%	6	0.19%	-284	-8.93%	3,178
Sargent	1,662	52.90%	1,473	46.88%	7	0.22%	189	6.02%	3,142
Sheridan	1,646	77.71%	472	22.29%	0	0.00%	1,174	55.42%	2,118
Sioux	718	59.98%	476	39.77%	3	0.25%	242	20.21%	1,197
Slope	433	51.98%	397	47.66%	3	0.36%	36	4.32%	833
Stark	4,251	70.38%	1,778	29.44%	11	0.18%	2,473	40.94%	6,040
Steele	1,188	50.83%	1,148	49.12%	1	0.04%	40	1.71%	2,337
Stutsman	5,718	59.85%	3,825	40.04%	11	0.12%	1,893	19.81%	9,554
Towner	1,391	54.25%	1,169	45.59%	4	0.16%	222	8.66%	2,564
Traill	3,090	61.04%	1,969	38.90%	3	0.06%	1,121	22.14%	5,062
Walsh	3,946	54.81%	3,238	44.97%	16	0.22%	708	9.84%	7,200
Ward	9,042	60.96%	5,762	38.85%	28	0.19%	3,280	22.11%	14,832
Wells	2,912	66.87%	1,434	32.93%	9	0.21%	1,478	33.94%	4,355
Williams	4,188	50.07%	4,157	49.70%	19	0.23%	31	0.37%	8,364
Totals	156,766	61.72%	96,742	38.09%	483	0.19%	60,024	23.63%	253,991

==== Counties that flipped from Republican to Democratic ====
- Rolette
- Mountrail

== See also ==
- United States presidential elections in North Dakota
