= 1952 United States presidential election in North Dakota =

- November 4, 1952

All 4 North Dakota votes to the Electoral College

Nominee	Dwight D. Eisenhower	Adlai Stevenson
Party	Republican	Democratic
Home state	New York	Illinois
Running mate	Richard Nixon	John Sparkman
Electoral vote	4	0
Popular vote	191,712	76,694
Percentage	70.97%	28.39%
County results
Eisenhower
50–60%
60–70%
70–80%
80–90%
90–100%
President before election
Harry S. Truman
Democratic
Elected President
Dwight D. Eisenhower
Republican

The 1952 United States presidential election in North Dakota took place on November 4, 1952, as part of the 1952 United States presidential election. Voters chose four representatives, or electors, to the Electoral College, who voted for president and vice president.

North Dakota was won by Columbia University President Dwight D. Eisenhower (R–New York), running with California Senator Richard Nixon, with 70.97 percent of the popular vote, against Adlai Stevenson (D–Illinois), running with Alabama Senator John Sparkman, with 28.39 percent of the popular vote. As of 2024, this is the last election in which a presidential candidate carried all of the counties in the state and the last that Rolette County has voted for a Republican presidential candidate. With 70.97 percent of the popular vote, North Dakota was Eisenhower's second strongest state after Vermont.

== Results ==
1952 United States presidential election in North Dakota
Party	Candidate	Votes	%
Republican	Dwight D. Eisenhower	191,712	70.97%
Democratic	Adlai Stevenson	76,694	28.39%
Christian Nationalist	Douglas MacArthur	1,075	0.40%
Progressive	Vincent Hallinan	344	0.13%
Prohibition	Stuart Hamblen	302	0.11%
Total votes		270,127	100%

=== Results by county ===
County	Dwight D. Eisenhower Republican		Adlai Stevenson Democratic		Douglas MacArthur Christian Nationalist		Vincent Hallinan Progressive		Stuart Hamblen Prohibition		Margin		Total votes cast
County	#	%	#	%	#	%	#	%	#	%	#	%	Total votes cast
Adams	1,561	69.59%	663	29.56%	11	0.49%	5	0.22%	3	0.13%	898	40.03%	2,243
Barnes	5,534	71.84%	2,120	27.52%	22	0.29%	7	0.09%	20	0.26%	3,414	44.32%	7,703
Benson	3,192	69.63%	1,353	29.52%	31	0.68%	2	0.04%	6	0.13%	1,839	40.11%	4,584
Billings	674	82.00%	143	17.40%	5	0.61%	0	0.00%	0	0.00%	531	64.60%	822
Bottineau	3,911	77.69%	1,094	21.73%	23	0.46%	3	0.06%	3	0.06%	2,817	55.96%	5,034
Bowman	1,375	71.21%	540	27.96%	7	0.36%	4	0.21%	5	0.26%	835	43.25%	1,931
Burke	1,986	69.90%	811	28.55%	16	0.56%	20	0.70%	8	0.28%	1,175	41.35%	2,841
Burleigh	9,526	79.55%	2,400	20.04%	25	0.21%	20	0.17%	4	0.03%	7,126	59.51%	11,975
Cass	18,094	66.17%	9,193	33.62%	36	0.13%	15	0.05%	6	0.02%	8,901	32.55%	27,344
Cavalier	3,519	69.66%	1,496	29.61%	27	0.53%	6	0.12%	4	0.08%	2,023	40.05%	5,052
Dickey	2,917	71.23%	1,150	28.08%	12	0.29%	9	0.22%	7	0.17%	1,767	43.15%	4,095
Divide	1,999	70.79%	807	28.58%	11	0.39%	3	0.11%	4	0.14%	1,192	42.21%	2,824
Dunn	2,237	76.50%	664	22.71%	13	0.44%	9	0.31%	1	0.03%	1,573	53.79%	2,924
Eddy	1,534	67.05%	728	31.82%	11	0.48%	15	0.66%	0	0.00%	806	35.23%	2,288
Emmons	3,369	86.16%	522	13.35%	12	0.31%	5	0.13%	2	0.05%	2,847	72.81%	3,910
Foster	1,558	64.17%	862	35.50%	5	0.21%	3	0.12%	0	0.00%	696	28.67%	2,428
Golden Valley	1,186	75.93%	376	24.07%	0	0.00%	0	0.00%	0	0.00%	810	51.86%	1,562
Grand Forks	10,939	65.65%	5,639	33.84%	61	0.37%	12	0.07%	11	0.07%	5,300	31.81%	16,662
Grant	2,465	85.32%	403	13.95%	13	0.45%	3	0.10%	5	0.17%	2,062	71.37%	2,889
Griggs	1,727	66.19%	872	33.42%	6	0.23%	1	0.04%	3	0.11%	855	32.77%	2,609
Hettinger	2,330	87.79%	297	11.19%	12	0.45%	13	0.49%	2	0.08%	2,033	76.60%	2,654
Kidder	2,195	81.93%	468	17.47%	13	0.49%	3	0.11%	0	0.00%	1,727	64.46%	2,679
LaMoure	3,202	73.12%	1,145	26.15%	19	0.43%	9	0.21%	4	0.09%	2,057	46.97%	4,379
Logan	2,165	85.10%	369	14.50%	6	0.24%	3	0.12%	1	0.04%	1,796	70.60%	2,544
McHenry	4,227	76.60%	1,228	22.25%	31	0.56%	29	0.53%	3	0.05%	2,999	54.35%	5,518
McIntosh	3,043	90.89%	276	8.24%	25	0.75%	4	0.12%	0	0.00%	2,767	82.65%	3,348
McKenzie	2,260	71.70%	846	26.84%	23	0.73%	12	0.38%	11	0.35%	1,414	44.86%	3,152
McLean	5,184	68.62%	2,295	30.38%	58	0.77%	14	0.19%	4	0.05%	2,889	38.24%	7,555
Mercer	2,994	84.96%	512	14.53%	16	0.45%	1	0.03%	1	0.03%	2,482	70.43%	3,524
Morton	6,309	74.88%	2,079	24.67%	23	0.27%	1	0.01%	14	0.17%	4,230	50.21%	8,426
Mountrail	2,516	62.93%	1,437	35.94%	28	0.70%	8	0.20%	9	0.23%	1,079	26.99%	3,998
Nelson	2,443	62.96%	1,418	36.55%	11	0.28%	4	0.10%	4	0.10%	1,025	26.41%	3,880
Oliver	1,132	87.82%	143	11.09%	11	0.85%	2	0.16%	1	0.08%	989	76.73%	1,289
Pembina	4,012	67.50%	1,891	31.81%	34	0.57%	1	0.02%	6	0.10%	2,121	35.69%	5,944
Pierce	2,806	77.77%	773	21.42%	24	0.67%	1	0.03%	4	0.11%	2,033	56.35%	3,608
Ramsey	4,670	71.97%	1,794	27.65%	19	0.29%	1	0.02%	5	0.08%	2,876	44.32%	6,489
Ransom	3,051	70.19%	1,265	29.10%	15	0.35%	4	0.09%	12	0.28%	1,786	41.09%	4,347
Renville	1,571	66.57%	767	32.50%	16	0.68%	5	0.21%	1	0.04%	804	34.07%	2,360
Richland	6,022	69.78%	2,541	29.44%	44	0.51%	14	0.16%	9	0.10%	3,481	40.34%	8,630
Rolette	2,188	65.02%	1,160	34.47%	14	0.42%	1	0.03%	2	0.06%	1,028	30.55%	3,365
Sargent	2,124	65.76%	1,090	33.75%	9	0.28%	4	0.12%	3	0.09%	1,034	32.01%	3,230
Sheridan	2,016	87.31%	267	11.56%	22	0.95%	2	0.09%	2	0.09%	1,749	75.75%	2,309
Sioux	968	73.22%	336	25.42%	11	0.83%	2	0.15%	5	0.38%	632	47.80%	1,322
Slope	682	69.38%	290	29.50%	6	0.61%	1	0.10%	4	0.41%	392	39.88%	983
Stark	5,322	79.58%	1,332	19.92%	18	0.27%	4	0.06%	12	0.18%	3,990	59.66%	6,688
Steele	1,513	62.16%	911	37.43%	7	0.29%	2	0.08%	1	0.04%	602	24.73%	2,434
Stutsman	6,713	67.70%	3,156	31.83%	26	0.26%	1	0.01%	20	0.20%	3,557	35.87%	9,916
Towner	1,960	69.23%	843	29.78%	20	0.71%	1	0.04%	7	0.25%	1,117	39.45%	2,831
Traill	3,884	72.05%	1,484	27.53%	15	0.28%	6	0.11%	2	0.04%	2,400	44.52%	5,391
Walsh	4,761	57.33%	3,494	42.08%	28	0.34%	7	0.08%	14	0.17%	1,267	15.25%	8,304
Ward	10,130	66.60%	4,966	32.65%	68	0.45%	18	0.12%	29	0.19%	5,164	33.95%	15,211
Wells	3,709	77.89%	1,016	21.34%	28	0.59%	4	0.08%	5	0.10%	2,693	56.55%	4,762
Williams	4,307	58.46%	2,999	40.71%	28	0.38%	27	0.37%	6	0.08%	1,308	17.75%	7,367
Totals	191,712	70.97%	76,694	28.39%	1,075	0.40%	344	0.13%	302	0.11%	115,018	42.58%	270,127

==== Counties that flipped from Democratic to Republican ====
- Benson
- Cavalier
- Foster
- Grand Forks
- Griggs
- McKenzie
- Mountrail
- Pembina
- Renville
- Rolette
- Sargent
- Steele
- Walsh
- Williams

== See also ==
- United States presidential elections in North Dakota
