= 1976 United States presidential election in North Dakota =

- November 2, 1976

Nominee	Gerald Ford	Jimmy Carter
Party	Republican	Democratic-NPL
Home state	Michigan	Georgia
Running mate	Bob Dole	Walter Mondale
Electoral vote	3	0
Popular vote	153,470	136,078
Percentage	51.66%	45.80%
County results
Ford
40–50%
50–60%
60–70%
Carter
40–50%
50–60%
60–70%
President before election
Gerald Ford
Republican
Elected President
Jimmy Carter
Democratic

The 1976 United States presidential election in North Dakota took place on November 2, 1976, as part of the 1976 United States presidential election. Voters chose three representatives, or electors, to the Electoral College, who voted for president and vice president.

North Dakota was won by the Republican candidate and incumbent President, Gerald Ford, with 51.66% of the popular vote, against the Democratic candidate, Jimmy Carter, with 45.80% of the popular vote. American Party candidate Thomas Anderson finished highest among third parties; finishing with 1.24% of North Dakota's popular vote.

Despite losing in North Dakota, Carter went on to win the national election and became the 39th president of the United States. As of the 2024 presidential election, this is the last election in which Morton County, Walsh County, McLean County, Pierce County, Cavalier County, Emmons County, Dunn County, Foster County, Renville County, Griggs County, and Adams County voted for a Democratic presidential candidate.

== Results ==
1976 United States presidential election in North Dakota
Party	Candidate	Votes	%
Republican	Gerald Ford (incumbent)	152,470	51.66%
Democratic–NPL	Jimmy Carter	136,078	45.80%
American	Thomas Anderson	3,698	1.24%
Independent	Eugene McCarthy	2,952	0.99%
American Independent	Lester Maddox	269	0.09%
Libertarian	Roger MacBride	256	0.09%
U.S. Labor	Lyndon LaRouche	142	0.05%
Communist	Gus Hall	85	0.03%
Prohibition	Benjamin Bubar	63	0.02%
Socialist Workers	Peter Camejo	43	0.01%
Socialist	Frank Zeidler	38	0.01%
Total votes		297,094	100%

=== Results by county ===
County	Gerald Ford Republican		Jimmy Carter Democratic-NPL		Thomas Anderson American		Eugene McCarthy Independent		Various candidates Other parties		Margin		Total votes cast
County	#	%	#	%	#	%	#	%	#	%	#	%	Total votes cast
Adams	940	48.53%	959	49.51%	11	0.57%	23	1.19%	4	0.21%	-19	-0.98%	1,937
Barnes	4,011	53.75%	3,321	44.51%	45	0.60%	72	0.96%	13	0.17%	690	9.24%	7,462
Benson	1,689	45.34%	1,973	52.97%	26	0.70%	25	0.67%	12	0.32%	-284	-7.63%	3,725
Billings	351	51.32%	285	41.67%	27	3.95%	18	2.63%	3	0.44%	66	9.65%	684
Bottineau	2,638	56.13%	1,987	42.28%	26	0.55%	36	0.77%	13	0.28%	651	13.85%	4,700
Bowman	1,033	51.70%	911	45.60%	24	1.20%	25	1.25%	5	0.25%	122	6.10%	1,998
Burke	1,087	52.03%	899	43.03%	77	3.69%	21	1.01%	5	0.24%	188	9.00%	2,089
Burleigh	13,680	58.09%	9,188	39.02%	413	1.75%	217	0.92%	51	0.22%	4,492	19.07%	23,549
Cass	22,583	54.53%	17,879	43.17%	203	0.49%	598	1.44%	148	0.36%	4,704	11.36%	41,411
Cavalier	2,046	47.58%	2,178	50.65%	49	1.14%	27	0.63%	0	0.00%	-132	-3.07%	4,300
Dickey	2,027	54.65%	1,612	43.46%	37	1.00%	30	0.81%	3	0.08%	415	11.19%	3,709
Divide	881	44.54%	1,057	53.44%	14	0.71%	15	0.76%	11	0.56%	-176	-8.90%	1,978
Dunn	1,041	48.26%	1,051	48.73%	50	2.32%	14	0.65%	1	0.05%	-10	-0.47%	2,157
Eddy	890	43.33%	1,123	54.67%	22	1.07%	14	0.68%	5	0.24%	-233	-11.34%	2,054
Emmons	1,370	45.91%	1,459	48.89%	134	4.49%	14	0.47%	7	0.23%	-89	-2.98%	2,984
Foster	1,120	48.59%	1,147	49.76%	9	0.39%	25	1.08%	4	0.17%	-27	-1.17%	2,305
Golden Valley	633	52.40%	479	39.65%	80	6.62%	13	1.08%	3	0.25%	154	12.75%	1,208
Grand Forks	13,820	52.71%	11,545	44.03%	415	1.58%	350	1.33%	88	0.34%	2,275	8.68%	26,218
Grant	1,205	53.37%	952	42.16%	78	3.45%	18	0.80%	5	0.22%	253	11.21%	2,258
Griggs	1,086	48.01%	1,122	49.60%	32	1.41%	21	0.93%	1	0.04%	-36	-1.59%	2,262
Hettinger	1,135	49.30%	1,095	47.57%	45	1.95%	20	0.87%	7	0.30%	40	1.73%	2,302
Kidder	954	47.16%	936	46.27%	113	5.59%	13	0.64%	7	0.35%	18	0.89%	2,023
LaMoure	1,735	49.04%	1,718	48.56%	48	1.36%	26	0.73%	11	0.31%	17	0.48%	3,538
Logan	944	50.32%	809	43.12%	101	5.38%	16	0.85%	6	0.32%	135	7.20%	1,876
McHenry	2,043	49.70%	1,994	48.50%	24	0.58%	43	1.05%	7	0.17%	49	1.20%	4,111
McIntosh	1,785	64.30%	912	32.85%	66	2.38%	6	0.22%	7	0.25%	873	31.45%	2,776
McKenzie	1,595	53.56%	1,335	44.83%	27	0.91%	12	0.40%	9	0.30%	260	8.73%	2,978
McLean	2,729	48.17%	2,815	49.69%	66	1.17%	41	0.72%	14	0.25%	-86	-1.52%	5,665
Mercer	1,982	59.77%	1,298	39.14%	33	1.00%	1	0.03%	2	0.06%	684	20.63%	3,316
Morton	4,921	47.04%	5,241	50.10%	198	1.89%	82	0.78%	20	0.19%	-320	-3.06%	10,462
Mountrail	1,430	38.57%	2,189	59.03%	47	1.27%	34	0.92%	8	0.22%	-759	-20.46%	3,708
Nelson	1,336	44.31%	1,610	53.40%	35	1.16%	27	0.90%	7	0.23%	-274	-9.09%	3,015
Oliver	575	50.44%	529	46.40%	20	1.75%	13	1.14%	3	0.26%	46	4.04%	1,140
Pembina	2,810	53.95%	2,274	43.66%	57	1.09%	53	1.02%	15	0.29%	536	10.29%	5,209
Pierce	1,396	48.35%	1,434	49.67%	32	1.11%	21	0.73%	4	0.14%	-38	-1.32%	2,887
Ramsey	3,293	50.65%	3,096	47.62%	40	0.62%	53	0.82%	20	0.31%	197	3.03%	6,502
Ransom	1,696	49.07%	1,715	49.62%	17	0.49%	23	0.67%	5	0.14%	-19	-0.55%	3,456
Renville	812	43.99%	1,008	54.60%	14	0.76%	9	0.49%	3	0.16%	-196	-10.61%	1,846
Richland	4,991	51.01%	4,592	46.93%	91	0.93%	94	0.96%	17	0.17%	399	4.08%	9,785
Rolette	1,094	29.62%	2,531	68.54%	24	0.65%	37	1.00%	7	0.19%	-1,437	-38.92%	3,693
Sargent	1,344	44.34%	1,644	54.24%	18	0.59%	22	0.73%	3	0.10%	-300	-9.90%	3,031
Sheridan	935	60.87%	569	37.04%	19	1.24%	10	0.65%	3	0.20%	366	23.83%	1,536
Sioux	354	32.75%	697	64.48%	15	1.39%	13	1.20%	2	0.19%	-343	-31.73%	1,081
Slope	355	48.90%	347	47.80%	8	1.10%	12	1.65%	4	0.55%	8	1.10%	726
Stark	4,374	49.93%	4,076	46.53%	193	2.20%	70	0.80%	47	0.54%	298	3.40%	8,760
Steele	835	43.35%	1,066	55.35%	10	0.52%	12	0.62%	3	0.16%	-231	-12.00%	1,926
Stutsman	5,653	52.44%	4,883	45.30%	115	1.07%	99	0.92%	30	0.28%	770	7.14%	10,780
Towner	993	44.45%	1,216	54.43%	12	0.54%	10	0.45%	3	0.13%	-223	-9.98%	2,234
Traill	2,800	53.32%	2,352	44.79%	27	0.51%	56	1.07%	16	0.30%	448	8.53%	5,251
Walsh	3,518	48.13%	3,555	48.64%	142	1.94%	79	1.08%	15	0.21%	-37	-0.51%	7,309
Ward	12,751	56.12%	9,484	41.74%	176	0.77%	229	1.01%	81	0.36%	3,267	14.38%	22,721
Wells	1,941	51.53%	1,742	46.24%	38	1.01%	35	0.93%	11	0.29%	199	5.29%	3,767
Williams	4,230	48.67%	4,189	48.19%	88	1.01%	73	0.84%	112	1.29%	41	0.48%	8,692
Totals	153,470	51.66%	136,078	45.80%	3,698	1.24%	2,952	0.99%	896	0.30%	17,392	5.86%	297,094

==== Counties that flipped from Republican to Democratic ====
- Adams
- Benson
- Cavalier
- Divide
- Dunn
- Eddy
- Emmons
- Foster
- Griggs
- McLean
- Morton
- Mountrail
- Nelson
- Pierce
- Ransom
- Renville
- Sargent
- Sioux
- Steele
- Towner
- Walsh

== See also ==
- United States presidential elections in North Dakota
