= 1968 United States presidential election in North Dakota =

- November 5, 1968

| Nominee | Richard Nixon | Hubert Humphrey | George Wallace |
| Party | Republican | Democratic-NPL | Independent |
| Alliance | | | American Independent |
| Home state | New York (Note: Although he was born in California and he served as a U.S. senator from California, in 1968 Richard Nixon’s official state of residence was New York, because he moved there to practice law after his defeat in the 1962 California gubernatorial election. During his first term as president, Nixon re-established his residency in California. Consequently, most reliable reference books list Nixon's home state as New York in the 1968 election and his home state as California in the 1972 (and 1960) election.) | Minnesota | Alabama |
| Running mate | Spiro Agnew | Edmund Muskie | Curtis LeMay |
| Electoral vote | 4 | 0 | 0 |
| Popular vote | 138,669 | 94,769 | 14,244 |
| Percentage | 55.94% | 38.23% | 5.75% |
County results
Nixon
40–50%
50–60%
60–70%
70–80%
80–90%
Humphrey
40–50%
50–60%
President before election
Lyndon B. Johnson
Democratic
Elected President
Richard Nixon
Republican

The 1968 United States presidential election in North Dakota took place on November 5, 1968, as part of the 1968 United States presidential election. Voters chose four representatives, or electors, to the Electoral College, who voted for President and Vice President.

North Dakota was won by former Vice President Richard Nixon (Republican Party, New York), with 55.94% of the popular vote, against Vice President Hubert Humphrey (Democratic Party, Minnesota), with 38.23% of the popular vote, a 17.71% margin of victory. Independent candidate George Wallace received 5.75% of the popular vote. North Dakota was Nixon's fourth strongest state after Nebraska, Idaho and Utah.

This is the last election in which North Dakota had four electoral college votes; it lost its 2nd district due to reapportionment based on the 1970 census.

== Results ==
1968 United States presidential election in North Dakota
| Party | Candidate | Votes | % |
|---|---|---|---|
| Republican | Richard Nixon | 138,669 | 55.94% |
| Democratic–NPL | Hubert Humphrey | 94,769 | 38.23% |
| Independent | George Wallace | 14,244 | 5.75% |
| Independent | Fred Halstead | 128 | 0.05% |
| Independent | E. Harold Munn | 38 | 0.02% |
| Write-ins | Various candidates | 34 | 0.01% |
| Total votes | | 247,882 | 100% |

=== Results by county ===
| County | Richard Nixon Republican | | Hubert Humphrey Democratic-NPL | | George Wallace Independent | | Fred Halstead Independent | | Various candidates Other parties | | Margin | | Total votes cast |
| County | # | % | # | % | # | % | # | % | # | % | # | % | Total votes cast |
|---|---|---|---|---|---|---|---|---|---|---|---|---|---|
| Adams | 1,020 | 57.27% | 641 | 35.99% | 116 | 6.51% | 1 | 0.06% | 3 | 0.17% | 379 | 21.28% | 1,781 |
| Barnes | 3,831 | 56.30% | 2,623 | 38.55% | 348 | 5.11% | 1 | 0.01% | 2 | 0.03% | 1,208 | 17.75% | 6,805 |
| Benson | 1,707 | 46.86% | 1,772 | 48.64% | 164 | 4.50% | 0 | 0.00% | 0 | 0.00% | -65 | -1.78% | 3,643 |
| Billings | 395 | 61.91% | 174 | 27.27% | 69 | 10.82% | 0 | 0.00% | 0 | 0.00% | 221 | 34.64% | 638 |
| Bottineau | 2,633 | 60.06% | 1,520 | 34.67% | 230 | 5.25% | 1 | 0.02% | 0 | 0.00% | 1,113 | 25.39% | 4,384 |
| Bowman | 927 | 56.46% | 559 | 34.04% | 156 | 9.50% | 0 | 0.00% | 0 | 0.00% | 368 | 22.42% | 1,642 |
| Burke | 1,239 | 56.83% | 808 | 37.06% | 132 | 6.06% | 1 | 0.05% | 0 | 0.00% | 431 | 19.77% | 2,180 |
| Burleigh | 10,661 | 64.03% | 5,139 | 30.87% | 818 | 4.91% | 25 | 0.15% | 6 | 0.04% | 5,522 | 33.16% | 16,649 |
| Cass | 15,240 | 55.88% | 10,819 | 39.67% | 1,167 | 4.28% | 33 | 0.12% | 12 | 0.04% | 4,421 | 16.21% | 27,271 |
| Cavalier | 1,953 | 50.85% | 1,631 | 42.46% | 257 | 6.69% | 0 | 0.00% | 0 | 0.00% | 322 | 8.39% | 3,841 |
| Dickey | 2,087 | 62.34% | 1,098 | 32.80% | 161 | 4.81% | 2 | 0.06% | 0 | 0.00% | 989 | 29.54% | 3,348 |
| Divide | 1,032 | 50.39% | 914 | 44.63% | 102 | 4.98% | 0 | 0.00% | 0 | 0.00% | 118 | 5.76% | 2,048 |
| Dunn | 1,207 | 56.17% | 772 | 35.92% | 169 | 7.86% | 1 | 0.05% | 0 | 0.00% | 435 | 20.25% | 2,149 |
| Eddy | 1,018 | 51.10% | 893 | 44.83% | 76 | 3.82% | 3 | 0.15% | 2 | 0.10% | 125 | 6.27% | 1,992 |
| Emmons | 1,991 | 65.04% | 756 | 24.70% | 311 | 10.16% | 2 | 0.07% | 1 | 0.03% | 1,235 | 40.34% | 3,061 |
| Foster | 1,119 | 52.31% | 897 | 41.94% | 123 | 5.75% | 0 | 0.00% | 0 | 0.00% | 222 | 10.37% | 2,139 |
| Golden Valley | 735 | 61.30% | 348 | 29.02% | 115 | 9.59% | 1 | 0.08% | 0 | 0.00% | 387 | 32.28% | 1,199 |
| Grand Forks | 9,802 | 52.00% | 7,695 | 40.82% | 1,332 | 7.07% | 18 | 0.10% | 2 | 0.01% | 2,107 | 11.18% | 18,849 |
| Grant | 1,648 | 71.78% | 488 | 21.25% | 157 | 6.84% | 2 | 0.09% | 1 | 0.04% | 1,160 | 50.53% | 2,296 |
| Griggs | 1,110 | 49.84% | 1,008 | 45.26% | 109 | 4.89% | 0 | 0.00% | 0 | 0.00% | 102 | 4.58% | 2,227 |
| Hettinger | 1,424 | 63.97% | 638 | 28.66% | 163 | 7.32% | 1 | 0.04% | 0 | 0.00% | 786 | 35.31% | 2,226 |
| Kidder | 1,204 | 61.84% | 548 | 28.15% | 192 | 9.86% | 1 | 0.05% | 2 | 0.10% | 656 | 33.69% | 1,947 |
| LaMoure | 2,008 | 57.90% | 1,269 | 36.59% | 189 | 5.45% | 2 | 0.06% | 0 | 0.00% | 739 | 21.31% | 3,468 |
| Logan | 1,416 | 70.45% | 459 | 22.84% | 135 | 6.72% | 0 | 0.00% | 0 | 0.00% | 957 | 47.61% | 2,010 |
| McHenry | 2,226 | 54.21% | 1,595 | 38.85% | 281 | 6.84% | 3 | 0.07% | 1 | 0.02% | 631 | 15.36% | 4,106 |
| McIntosh | 2,258 | 82.65% | 342 | 12.52% | 129 | 4.72% | 3 | 0.11% | 0 | 0.00% | 1,916 | 70.13% | 2,732 |
| McKenzie | 1,625 | 59.63% | 935 | 34.31% | 164 | 6.02% | 1 | 0.04% | 0 | 0.00% | 690 | 25.32% | 2,725 |
| McLean | 2,764 | 54.95% | 2,050 | 40.76% | 216 | 4.29% | 0 | 0.00% | 0 | 0.00% | 714 | 14.19% | 5,030 |
| Mercer | 2,039 | 69.38% | 730 | 24.84% | 169 | 5.75% | 1 | 0.03% | 0 | 0.00% | 1,309 | 44.54% | 2,939 |
| Morton | 4,465 | 55.02% | 3,156 | 38.89% | 489 | 6.03% | 1 | 0.01% | 4 | 0.05% | 1,309 | 16.13% | 8,115 |
| Mountrail | 1,494 | 44.33% | 1,662 | 49.32% | 212 | 6.29% | 2 | 0.06% | 0 | 0.00% | -168 | -4.99% | 3,370 |
| Nelson | 1,526 | 48.26% | 1,477 | 46.71% | 157 | 4.97% | 1 | 0.03% | 1 | 0.03% | 49 | 1.55% | 3,162 |
| Oliver | 616 | 63.44% | 269 | 27.70% | 85 | 8.75% | 1 | 0.10% | 0 | 0.00% | 347 | 35.74% | 971 |
| Pembina | 2,574 | 56.01% | 1,686 | 36.68% | 335 | 7.29% | 1 | 0.02% | 0 | 0.00% | 888 | 19.33% | 4,596 |
| Pierce | 1,700 | 57.07% | 1,048 | 35.18% | 229 | 7.69% | 1 | 0.03% | 1 | 0.03% | 652 | 21.89% | 2,979 |
| Ramsey | 3,189 | 54.56% | 2,384 | 40.79% | 269 | 4.60% | 3 | 0.05% | 0 | 0.00% | 805 | 13.77% | 5,845 |
| Ransom | 1,943 | 57.43% | 1,286 | 38.01% | 153 | 4.52% | 1 | 0.03% | 0 | 0.00% | 657 | 19.42% | 3,383 |
| Renville | 851 | 46.86% | 880 | 48.46% | 84 | 4.63% | 1 | 0.06% | 0 | 0.00% | -29 | -1.60% | 1,816 |
| Richland | 4,224 | 54.38% | 3,098 | 39.89% | 443 | 5.70% | 1 | 0.01% | 1 | 0.01% | 1,126 | 14.49% | 7,767 |
| Rolette | 1,211 | 37.23% | 1,870 | 57.49% | 172 | 5.29% | 0 | 0.00% | 0 | 0.00% | -659 | -20.26% | 3,253 |
| Sargent | 1,386 | 48.65% | 1,308 | 45.91% | 154 | 5.41% | 1 | 0.04% | 0 | 0.00% | 78 | 2.74% | 2,849 |
| Sheridan | 1,295 | 74.99% | 350 | 20.27% | 79 | 4.57% | 1 | 0.06% | 2 | 0.12% | 945 | 54.72% | 1,727 |
| Sioux | 482 | 45.26% | 525 | 49.30% | 58 | 5.45% | 0 | 0.00% | 0 | 0.00% | -43 | -4.04% | 1,065 |
| Slope | 379 | 55.57% | 238 | 34.90% | 64 | 9.38% | 1 | 0.15% | 0 | 0.00% | 141 | 20.67% | 682 |
| Stark | 4,365 | 58.64% | 2,577 | 34.62% | 500 | 6.72% | 1 | 0.01% | 1 | 0.01% | 1,788 | 24.02% | 7,444 |
| Steele | 952 | 46.87% | 991 | 48.79% | 88 | 4.33% | 0 | 0.00% | 0 | 0.00% | -39 | -1.92% | 2,031 |
| Stutsman | 5,162 | 56.21% | 3,532 | 38.46% | 477 | 5.19% | 5 | 0.05% | 8 | 0.09% | 1,630 | 17.75% | 9,184 |
| Towner | 1,109 | 49.84% | 990 | 44.49% | 124 | 5.57% | 2 | 0.09% | 0 | 0.00% | 119 | 5.35% | 2,225 |
| Traill | 2,692 | 57.55% | 1,740 | 37.20% | 243 | 5.19% | 2 | 0.04% | 1 | 0.02% | 952 | 20.35% | 4,678 |
| Walsh | 3,410 | 50.06% | 2,948 | 43.28% | 453 | 6.65% | 1 | 0.01% | 0 | 0.00% | 462 | 6.78% | 6,812 |
| Ward | 9,079 | 53.11% | 7,105 | 41.56% | 896 | 5.24% | 11 | 0.06% | 4 | 0.02% | 1,974 | 11.55% | 17,095 |
| Wells | 2,266 | 59.92% | 1,265 | 33.45% | 247 | 6.53% | 4 | 0.11% | 0 | 0.00% | 1,001 | 26.47% | 3,782 |
| Williams | 3,980 | 51.51% | 3,263 | 42.23% | 483 | 6.25% | 0 | 0.00% | 0 | 0.00% | 717 | 9.28% | 7,726 |
| Totals | 138,669 | 55.94% | 94,769 | 38.23% | 14,244 | 5.75% | 128 | 0.05% | 72 | 0.03% | 43,900 | 17.71% | 247,882 |

==== Counties that flipped from Democratic to Republican ====
- Adams
- Barnes
- Cass
- Grand Forks
- Billings
- Bottineau
- Bowman
- Burke
- Burleigh
- Cavalier
- Dickey
- Divide
- Dunn
- Foster
- Griggs
- Hettinger
- LaMoure
- McHenry
- McKenzie
- McLean
- Morton
- Oliver
- Pembina
- Pierce
- Benson
- Eddy
- Nelson
- Ramsey
- Ransom
- Richland
- Sargent
- Slope
- Stark
- Stutsman
- Towner
- Traill
- Walsh
- Ward
- Wells
- Williams

== See also ==
- United States presidential elections in North Dakota
