= 1964 United States presidential election in North Dakota =

- November 3, 1964

Nominee	Lyndon B. Johnson	Barry Goldwater
Party	Democratic-NPL	Republican
Home state	Texas	Arizona
Running mate	Hubert Humphrey	William E. Miller
Electoral vote	4	0
Popular vote	149,784	108,207
Percentage	57.97%	41.88%
County results
Johnson
50–60%
60–70%
70–80%
Goldwater
50–60%
60–70%
President before election
Lyndon B. Johnson
Democratic
Elected President
Lyndon B. Johnson
Democratic

The 1964 United States presidential election in North Dakota took place on November 3, 1964, as part of the 1964 United States presidential election. Voters chose four representatives, or electors, to the Electoral College, who voted for president and vice president.

North Dakota was won by incumbent President Lyndon B. Johnson (D–Texas), with 57.97% of the popular vote, against Senator Barry Goldwater (R–Arizona), with 41.88% of the popular vote, a 16.09% margin of victory.

As of 2024, this is the only presidential race since 1936 where North Dakota voted Democratic, as well as the last time that a Democrat would carry the following counties: Burleigh, Ward, Stark, Williams, Stutsman, Richland, Barnes, Pembina, Bottineau, McKenzie, McHenry, Dickey, Wells, LaMoure, Bowman, Hettinger, Burke, Oliver, Billings, and Slope. This is also the last time that North Dakota voted more Democratic than South Dakota.

Emmons County, along with Camas and Custer counties in nearby Idaho, would be the only counties outside of the antebellum slave states to flip from Kennedy to Goldwater in this election.

== Results ==
1964 United States presidential election in North Dakota
Party	Candidate	Votes	%
Democratic–NPL	Lyndon B. Johnson (inc.)	149,784	57.97%
Republican	Barry Goldwater	108,207	41.88%
Independent	Clifton DeBerry	224	0.09%
Independent	E. Harold Munn	174	0.07%
Total votes		258,389	100%

=== Results by county ===
County	Lyndon B. Johnson Democratic-NPL		Barry Goldwater Republican		Clifton DeBerry Independent		E. Harold Munn Independent		Margin		Total votes cast
County	#	%	#	%	#	%	#	%	#	%	Total votes cast
Adams	1,010	53.50%	877	46.45%	1	0.05%	0	0.00%	133	7.05%	1,888
Barnes	4,007	57.18%	2,987	42.62%	14	0.20%	0	0.00%	1,020	14.56%	7,008
Benson	2,566	63.20%	1,489	36.67%	2	0.05%	3	0.07%	1,077	26.53%	4,060
Billings	348	50.58%	340	49.42%	0	0.00%	0	0.00%	8	1.16%	688
Bottineau	2,546	55.26%	2,060	44.71%	1	0.02%	0	0.00%	486	10.55%	4,607
Bowman	1,070	58.57%	756	41.38%	1	0.05%	0	0.00%	314	17.19%	1,827
Burke	1,454	59.74%	974	40.02%	6	0.25%	0	0.00%	480	19.72%	2,434
Burleigh	8,120	52.66%	7,239	46.95%	46	0.30%	14	0.09%	881	5.71%	15,419
Cass	15,674	54.67%	12,972	45.25%	11	0.04%	12	0.04%	2,702	9.42%	28,669
Cavalier	2,810	66.41%	1,417	33.49%	4	0.09%	0	0.00%	1,393	32.92%	4,231
Dickey	1,818	50.08%	1,808	49.81%	4	0.11%	0	0.00%	10	0.27%	3,630
Divide	1,498	65.67%	779	34.15%	2	0.09%	2	0.09%	719	31.52%	2,281
Dunn	1,351	55.55%	1,079	44.37%	1	0.04%	1	0.04%	272	11.18%	2,432
Eddy	1,337	64.03%	747	35.78%	4	0.19%	0	0.00%	590	28.25%	2,088
Emmons	1,556	46.94%	1,759	53.06%	0	0.00%	0	0.00%	−203	−6.12%	3,315
Foster	1,315	58.60%	927	41.31%	2	0.09%	0	0.00%	388	17.29%	2,244
Golden Valley	602	45.47%	722	54.53%	0	0.00%	0	0.00%	−120	−9.06%	1,324
Grand Forks	10,740	59.09%	7,367	40.53%	54	0.30%	14	0.08%	3,373	18.56%	18,175
Grant	1,063	42.73%	1,421	57.11%	1	0.04%	3	0.12%	−358	−14.38%	2,488
Griggs	1,505	62.97%	885	37.03%	0	0.00%	0	0.00%	620	25.94%	2,390
Hettinger	1,275	51.72%	1,188	48.19%	1	0.04%	1	0.04%	87	3.53%	2,465
Kidder	1,047	48.68%	1,104	51.32%	0	0.00%	0	0.00%	−57	−2.64%	2,151
LaMoure	2,145	57.12%	1,604	42.72%	6	0.16%	0	0.00%	541	14.40%	3,755
Logan	951	44.42%	1,187	55.44%	3	0.14%	0	0.00%	−236	−11.02%	2,141
McHenry	2,643	60.36%	1,728	39.46%	3	0.07%	5	0.11%	915	20.90%	4,379
McIntosh	950	33.44%	1,891	66.56%	0	0.00%	0	0.00%	−941	−33.12%	2,841
McKenzie	1,584	53.91%	1,352	46.02%	2	0.07%	0	0.00%	232	7.89%	2,938
McLean	3,339	60.19%	2,204	39.73%	3	0.05%	1	0.02%	1,135	20.46%	5,547
Mercer	1,310	45.96%	1,540	54.04%	0	0.00%	0	0.00%	−230	−8.08%	2,850
Morton	5,173	63.57%	2,955	36.31%	7	0.09%	3	0.04%	2,218	27.26%	8,138
Mountrail	2,548	69.18%	1,131	30.71%	2	0.05%	2	0.05%	1,417	38.47%	3,683
Nelson	2,186	66.50%	1,101	33.50%	0	0.00%	0	0.00%	1,085	33.00%	3,287
Oliver	548	53.88%	469	46.12%	0	0.00%	0	0.00%	79	7.76%	1,017
Pembina	3,198	61.89%	1,961	37.95%	3	0.06%	5	0.10%	1,237	23.94%	5,167
Pierce	1,893	61.60%	1,178	38.33%	1	0.03%	1	0.03%	715	23.27%	3,073
Ramsey	3,572	59.66%	2,409	40.24%	3	0.05%	3	0.05%	1,163	19.42%	5,987
Ransom	2,063	55.50%	1,647	44.31%	1	0.03%	6	0.16%	416	11.19%	3,717
Renville	1,356	67.90%	640	32.05%	1	0.05%	0	0.00%	716	35.85%	1,997
Richland	4,525	56.88%	3,425	43.05%	4	0.05%	1	0.01%	1,100	13.83%	7,955
Rolette	2,566	74.20%	892	25.80%	0	0.00%	0	0.00%	1,674	48.40%	3,458
Sargent	1,840	60.67%	1,189	39.20%	4	0.13%	0	0.00%	651	21.47%	3,033
Sheridan	724	37.89%	1,187	62.11%	0	0.00%	0	0.00%	−463	−24.22%	1,911
Sioux	695	68.61%	314	31.00%	2	0.20%	2	0.20%	381	37.61%	1,013
Slope	436	56.99%	329	43.01%	0	0.00%	0	0.00%	107	13.98%	765
Stark	4,270	59.63%	2,888	40.33%	2	0.03%	1	0.01%	1,382	19.30%	7,161
Steele	1,404	63.73%	796	36.13%	2	0.09%	1	0.05%	608	27.60%	2,203
Stutsman	5,463	57.66%	3,990	42.12%	10	0.11%	11	0.12%	1,473	15.54%	9,474
Towner	1,628	67.36%	788	32.60%	1	0.04%	0	0.00%	840	34.76%	2,417
Traill	2,614	53.03%	2,312	46.91%	1	0.02%	2	0.04%	302	6.12%	4,929
Walsh	4,911	66.58%	2,454	33.27%	4	0.05%	7	0.09%	2,457	33.31%	7,376
Ward	10,871	61.30%	6,798	38.33%	45	0.25%	21	0.12%	4,073	22.97%	17,735
Wells	2,314	55.24%	1,875	44.76%	0	0.00%	0	0.00%	439	10.48%	4,189
Williams	5,352	63.42%	3,076	36.45%	5	0.06%	6	0.07%	2,276	26.97%	8,439
Totals	149,784	57.97%	108,207	41.88%	224	0.09%	174	0.07%	41,577	16.09%	258,389

==== Counties that flipped from Republican to Democratic ====
- Adams
- Barnes
- Benson
- Eddy
- Cass
- Grand Forks
- Bottineau
- Bowman
- Burke
- Burleigh
- Cavalier
- Dickey
- Divide
- Dunn
- Foster
- Hettinger
- LaMoure
- McHenry
- McKenzie
- McLean
- Nelson
- Oliver
- Pembina
- Ramsey
- Ransom
- Richland
- Steele
- Slope
- Stutsman
- Towner
- Traill
- Walsh
- Ward
- Wells

==== Counties that flipped from Democratic to Republican ====
- Emmons

== See also ==
- United States presidential elections in North Dakota
