= 1980 United States presidential election in North Dakota =

- November 4, 1980

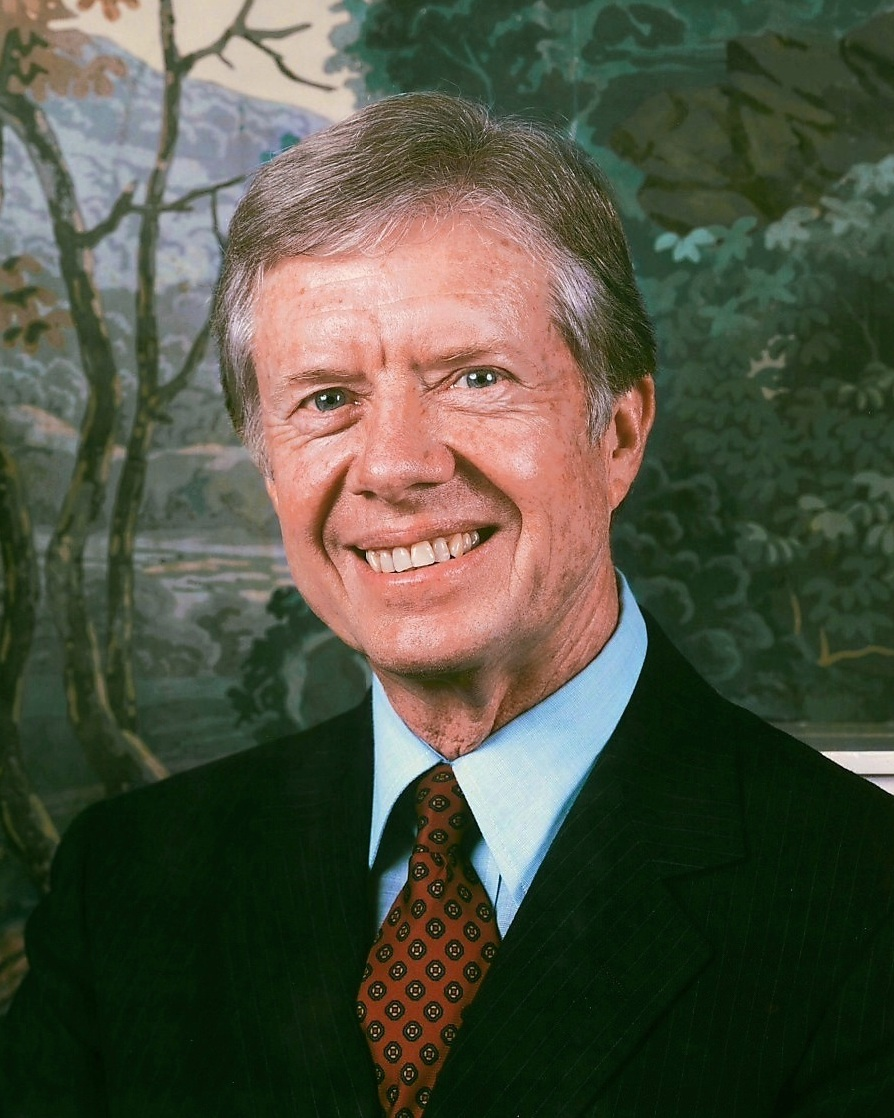

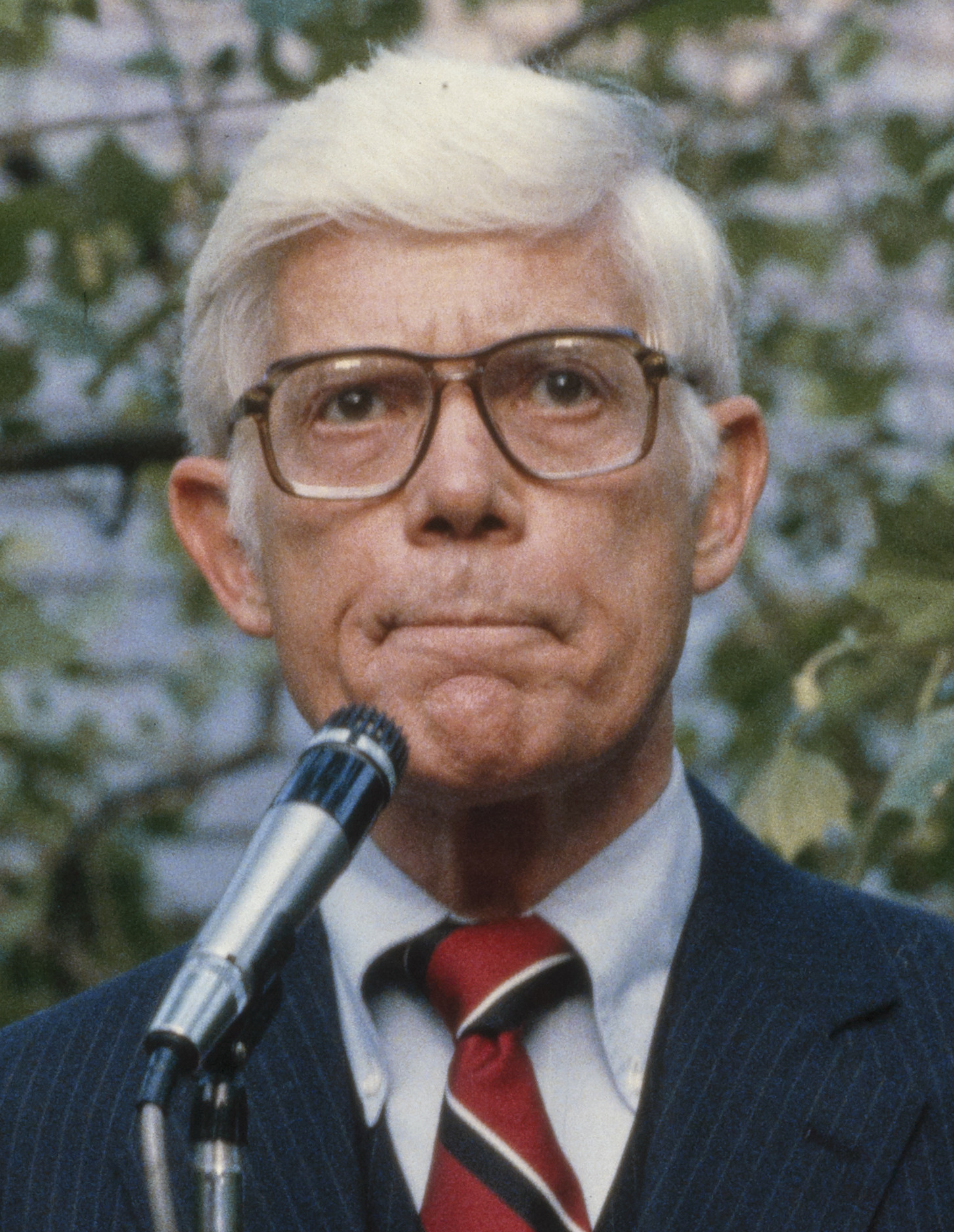
Nominee	Ronald Reagan	Jimmy Carter	John B. Anderson
Party	Republican	Democratic–NPL	Independent
Home state	California	Georgia	Illinois
Running mate	George H. W. Bush	Walter Mondale	Patrick Lucey
Electoral vote	3	0	0
Popular vote	193,695	79,189	23,640
Percentage	64.23%	26.26%	7.84%
County results
Reagan
50–60%
60–70%
70–80%
80–90%
Carter
40–50%
President before election
Jimmy Carter
Democratic
Elected President
Ronald Reagan
Republican

The 1980 United States presidential election in North Dakota took place on November 4, 1980. All 50 states and The District of Columbia were part of the 1980 United States presidential election. State voters chose three electors to the Electoral College, who voted for president and vice president.

North Dakota was won by former California Governor Ronald Reagan (R) by a 38-point landslide. With 64.23% of the popular vote, North Dakota would prove to be Reagan's fourth strongest state after Utah, Idaho and Nebraska.

As of the 2024 presidential election, this is the last election in which Sioux County, home of the Standing Rock Sioux Reservation, voted for a Republican presidential candidate.

== Results ==
1980 United States presidential election in North Dakota
Party	Candidate	Votes	%
Republican	Ronald Reagan	193,695	64.23%
Democratic–NPL	Jimmy Carter (incumbent)	79,189	26.26%
Independent	John Anderson	23,640	7.84%
Libertarian	Edward Clark	3,743	1.24%
Citizens	Barry Commoner	429	0.14%
Independent	Harley McLain	296	0.10%
American	Percy Greaves Jr.	235	0.08%
Communist	Gus Hall	93	0.03%
Socialist Workers	Clifton DeBerry	89	0.03%
Socialist	David McReynolds	82	0.03%
Prohibition	Benjamin Bubar	54	0.02%
Total votes		301,545	100.00%

=== Results by county ===
County	Ronald Reagan Republican		Jimmy Carter Democratic-NPL		John B. Anderson Independent		Ed Clark Libertarian		Various candidates Other parties		Margin		Total votes cast
County	#	%	#	%	#	%	#	%	#	%	#	%	Total votes cast
Adams	1,334	68.73%	470	24.21%	107	5.51%	28	1.44%	2	0.10%	864	44.52%	1,941
Barnes	4,392	59.79%	2,128	28.97%	705	9.60%	84	1.14%	37	0.50%	2,264	30.82%	7,346
Benson	2,149	59.91%	1,119	31.20%	262	7.30%	50	1.39%	7	0.20%	1,030	28.71%	3,587
Billings	524	76.05%	122	17.71%	33	4.79%	9	1.31%	1	0.15%	402	58.34%	689
Bottineau	3,394	70.30%	1,090	22.58%	267	5.53%	66	1.37%	11	0.23%	2,304	47.72%	4,828
Bowman	1,507	70.49%	454	21.23%	142	6.64%	31	1.45%	4	0.19%	1,053	49.26%	2,138
Burke	1,442	73.27%	418	21.24%	82	4.17%	19	0.97%	7	0.36%	1,024	52.03%	1,968
Burleigh	18,437	67.94%	6,129	22.59%	2,109	7.77%	341	1.26%	121	0.45%	12,308	45.35%	27,137
Cass	23,886	54.76%	13,562	31.09%	5,421	12.43%	479	1.10%	272	0.62%	10,324	23.67%	43,620
Cavalier	2,582	64.92%	1,105	27.78%	238	5.98%	49	1.23%	3	0.08%	1,477	37.14%	3,977
Dickey	2,455	68.69%	917	25.66%	161	4.50%	38	1.06%	3	0.08%	1,538	43.03%	3,574
Divide	1,267	66.06%	509	26.54%	109	5.68%	27	1.41%	6	0.31%	758	39.52%	1,918
Dunn	1,706	71.50%	532	22.30%	115	4.82%	28	1.17%	5	0.21%	1,174	49.20%	2,386
Eddy	1,153	61.23%	539	28.62%	145	7.70%	37	1.96%	9	0.48%	614	32.61%	1,883
Emmons	2,369	77.57%	502	16.44%	132	4.32%	39	1.28%	12	0.39%	1,867	61.13%	3,054
Foster	1,534	66.61%	586	25.45%	152	6.60%	29	1.26%	2	0.09%	948	41.16%	2,303
Golden Valley	1,006	74.57%	259	19.20%	62	4.60%	20	1.48%	2	0.15%	747	55.37%	1,349
Grand Forks	14,257	57.65%	6,997	28.29%	2,932	11.86%	349	1.41%	196	0.79%	7,260	29.36%	24,731
Grant	1,891	80.85%	317	13.55%	110	4.70%	15	0.64%	6	0.26%	1,574	67.30%	2,339
Griggs	1,342	61.84%	636	29.31%	158	7.28%	27	1.24%	7	0.32%	706	32.53%	2,170
Hettinger	1,699	75.28%	434	19.23%	104	4.61%	15	0.66%	5	0.22%	1,265	56.05%	2,257
Kidder	1,474	77.05%	326	17.04%	85	4.44%	16	0.84%	12	0.63%	1,148	60.01%	1,913
LaMoure	2,136	64.88%	850	25.82%	254	7.72%	41	1.25%	11	0.33%	1,286	39.06%	3,292
Logan	1,474	79.03%	283	15.17%	69	3.70%	32	1.72%	7	0.38%	1,191	63.86%	1,865
McHenry	2,922	71.20%	939	22.88%	190	4.63%	44	1.07%	9	0.22%	1,983	48.32%	4,104
McIntosh	2,471	86.01%	308	10.72%	72	2.51%	14	0.49%	8	0.28%	2,163	75.29%	2,873
McKenzie	2,265	67.25%	867	25.74%	182	5.40%	49	1.45%	5	0.15%	1,398	41.51%	3,368
McLean	4,234	67.79%	1,613	25.82%	318	5.09%	71	1.14%	10	0.16%	2,621	41.97%	6,246
Mercer	3,224	68.00%	1,209	25.50%	204	4.30%	92	1.94%	12	0.25%	2,015	42.50%	4,741
Morton	7,659	66.84%	2,861	24.97%	742	6.48%	148	1.29%	48	0.42%	4,798	41.87%	11,458
Mountrail	2,165	60.36%	1,183	32.98%	182	5.07%	45	1.25%	12	0.33%	982	27.38%	3,587
Nelson	1,611	62.08%	726	27.98%	226	8.71%	23	0.89%	9	0.35%	885	34.10%	2,595
Oliver	966	73.40%	270	20.52%	55	4.18%	19	1.44%	6	0.46%	696	52.88%	1,316
Pembina	3,101	65.73%	1,239	26.26%	303	6.42%	67	1.42%	8	0.17%	1,862	39.47%	4,718
Pierce	2,273	76.07%	517	17.30%	168	5.62%	28	0.94%	2	0.07%	1,756	58.77%	2,988
Ramsey	4,078	64.88%	1,607	25.57%	514	8.18%	67	1.07%	19	0.30%	2,471	39.31%	6,285
Ransom	1,883	59.93%	974	31.00%	237	7.54%	44	1.40%	4	0.13%	909	28.93%	3,142
Renville	1,154	62.65%	570	30.94%	98	5.32%	18	0.98%	2	0.11%	584	31.71%	1,842
Richland	5,711	61.17%	2,698	28.90%	750	8.03%	152	1.63%	26	0.28%	3,013	32.27%	9,337
Rolette	1,599	44.84%	1,660	46.55%	265	7.43%	33	0.93%	9	0.25%	-61	-1.71%	3,566
Sargent	1,565	55.44%	1,048	37.12%	174	6.16%	29	1.03%	7	0.25%	517	18.32%	2,823
Sheridan	1,326	82.51%	208	12.94%	65	4.04%	4	0.25%	4	0.25%	1,118	69.57%	1,607
Sioux	620	56.88%	383	35.14%	72	6.61%	9	0.83%	6	0.55%	237	21.74%	1,090
Slope	462	71.41%	128	19.78%	45	6.96%	8	1.24%	4	0.62%	334	51.63%	647
Stark	6,312	70.11%	2,016	22.39%	512	5.69%	131	1.46%	32	0.36%	4,296	47.72%	9,003
Steele	997	53.32%	617	32.99%	229	12.25%	19	1.02%	8	0.43%	380	20.33%	1,870
Stutsman	6,545	63.86%	2,573	25.10%	960	9.37%	108	1.05%	63	0.61%	3,972	38.76%	10,249
Towner	1,375	64.89%	568	26.81%	152	7.17%	23	1.09%	1	0.05%	807	38.08%	2,119
Traill	3,092	60.91%	1,428	28.13%	512	10.09%	35	0.69%	9	0.18%	1,664	32.78%	5,076
Walsh	4,488	64.69%	1,850	26.66%	485	6.99%	98	1.41%	17	0.25%	2,638	38.03%	6,938
Ward	14,997	67.59%	5,554	25.03%	1,234	5.56%	328	1.48%	76	0.34%	9,443	42.56%	22,189
Wells	2,660	73.91%	746	20.73%	148	4.11%	38	1.06%	7	0.19%	1,914	53.18%	3,599
Williams	6,530	65.93%	2,545	25.70%	592	5.98%	130	1.31%	107	1.08%	3,985	40.23%	9,904
Totals	193,695	64.23%	79,189	26.26%	23,640	7.84%	3,743	1.24%	1,278	0.42%	114,506	37.97%	301,545

==== Counties that flipped from Democratic to Republican ====
- Adams
- Benson
- Cavalier
- Divide
- Dunn
- Eddy
- Emmons
- Foster
- Griggs
- McLean
- Morton
- Mountrail
- Nelson
- Pierce
- Ransom
- Renville
- Sargent
- Sioux
- Steele
- Towner
- Walsh

== See also ==
- United States presidential elections in North Dakota
- Presidency of Ronald Reagan
