= 1932 United States presidential election in North Dakota =

- November 8, 1932

All 4 North Dakota votes to the Electoral College

Nominee	Franklin D. Roosevelt	Herbert Hoover
Party	Democratic	Republican
Home state	New York	California
Running mate	John Nance Garner	Charles Curtis
Electoral vote	4	0
Popular vote	178,350	71,772
Percentage	69.59%	28.00%
County results
Roosevelt
50–60%
60–70%
70–80%
80–90%
President before election
Herbert Hoover
Republican
Elected President
Franklin D. Roosevelt
Democratic

The 1932 United States presidential election in North Dakota took place on November 8, 1932, as part of the 1932 United States presidential election. Voters chose four representatives, or electors, to the Electoral College, who voted for president and vice president.

Ever since statehood, North Dakota had been overwhelmingly Republican at state level and in many presidential elections, although progressive Democrat Woodrow Wilson was able to carry the state in both his campaigns in 1912 and 1916, in the second due to his anti-war platform. In the following three elections, the state's voting would be shaped by its extreme isolationism in the aftermath of President Wilson's pushing of the nation into World War I and his "League of Nations" proposal, to which the Russian-Germans who dominated North Dakota's populace were vehemently opposed. North Dakota thus shifted markedly from voting four-to-one for Warren G. Harding against the pro-League James M. Cox in 1920, to being the second-strongest state for Robert La Follette under the Nonpartisan League banner in 1924, to strong pro-Catholic and anti-Prohibition voting for Al Smith in 1928 that made the state 7 points more Democratic than the nation at-large.

During the 1910s, North Dakota had been one of the major centres of Socialist and farmer radicalism. With the coming of the Depression, this radicalism returned, although unlike with the Socialist Party and later with La Follette, there was sharp division over whom to support in the ensuing presidential election, with some supporting veteran Populist and free silver advocate "Coin" Harvey and other supporting the Socialist or Communist Parties. Nonetheless, grievances of farmers against the Republicans had existed before incumbent Herbert Hoover's election in 1928. Democratic nominee and New York Governor Franklin D. Roosevelt was himself well-equipped to cater for this issue. After he had won the state's primary against Oklahoma populist "Alfalfa Bill" Murray, Roosevelt cultivated favor with North Dakota congressmen William Lemke, Lynn J. Frazier and Gerald P. Nye, and as Smith had in 1928, gained the support of former Senator Henry C. Hansbrough. Roosevelt's proposal to lessen the Smoot-Hawley Tariff to increase farmers’ foreign purchasing power, and to reduce acreage to increase prices for farmers further added to his support in this most agrarian state. Late proposals by Hoover to offer relief failed to make any impression, especially as the President had refused to support the bankruptcy and refinance bills advocated by Senator Frazier.

The earlier straw poll in the state, at the end of the third week of October, had Roosevelt leading by about seven-to-four over Hoover, and this poll had been taken amongst voters who had given Hoover a larger margin over Al Smith than North Dakota as a whole had. By the weekend preceding the poll, further polls seemed to confirm Hoover's hopes of carrying the state as forlorn, and as it turned out Roosevelt carried the state by a larger margin than even the latest polls expected. With the farming areas decimated by drought, Hoover support held up best in the cities of the Red River valley, but FDR still carried all 53 counties by double-digit majorities.

Roosevelt became the first Democrat to win a majority of North Dakota's vote in a presidential election, a feat he emulated in 1936 but which has otherwise only been achieved by Lyndon B. Johnson in 1964. This was also Roosevelt's strongest performance in any state outside of the Solid South. His 69.59 percent of the vote is the best Democratic performance in North Dakota presidential election history as well as the highest raw vote total for a Democrat in the state.

== Results ==
1932 United States presidential election in North Dakota
Party	Candidate	Votes	%
Democratic	Franklin D. Roosevelt	178,350	69.59%
Republican	Herbert Hoover (inc.)	71,772	28.00%
Socialist	Norman Thomas	3,521	1.37%
Liberty	William Hope Harvey	1,817	0.71%
Communist	William Z. Foster	830	0.32%
Total votes		256,290	100%

=== Results by county ===
County	Franklin D. Roosevelt Democratic		Herbert Hoover Republican		Norman M. Thomas Socialist		William Hope Harvey Liberty		William Z. Foster Communist		Margin		Total votes cast
County	#	%	#	%	#	%	#	%	#	%	#	%	Total votes cast
Adams	1,514	58.10%	915	35.11%	37	1.42%	128	4.91%	12	0.46%	599	22.99%	2,606
Barnes	4,833	63.04%	2,527	32.96%	120	1.57%	166	2.17%	21	0.27%	2,306	30.08%	7,667
Benson	3,650	74.23%	1,170	23.79%	59	1.20%	27	0.55%	11	0.22%	2,480	50.44%	4,917
Billings	760	70.44%	295	27.34%	10	0.93%	4	0.37%	10	0.93%	465	43.10%	1,079
Bottineau	4,178	75.05%	1,201	21.57%	166	2.98%	15	0.27%	7	0.13%	2,977	53.48%	5,567
Bowman	1,292	59.38%	616	28.31%	213	9.79%	44	2.02%	11	0.51%	676	31.07%	2,176
Burke	2,473	68.81%	906	25.21%	131	3.64%	15	0.42%	69	1.92%	1,567	43.60%	3,594
Burleigh	5,621	66.61%	2,687	31.84%	90	1.07%	9	0.11%	32	0.38%	2,934	34.77%	8,439
Cass	11,094	54.40%	8,937	43.82%	321	1.57%	25	0.12%	17	0.08%	2,157	10.58%	20,394
Cavalier	3,770	71.33%	1,471	27.83%	29	0.55%	5	0.09%	10	0.19%	2,299	43.50%	5,285
Dickey	3,068	66.08%	1,424	30.67%	59	1.27%	25	0.54%	67	1.44%	1,644	35.41%	4,643
Divide	2,374	69.78%	817	24.02%	68	2.00%	124	3.64%	19	0.56%	1,557	45.77%	3,402
Dunn	2,380	79.12%	569	18.92%	27	0.90%	21	0.70%	11	0.37%	1,811	60.21%	3,008
Eddy	1,888	74.71%	537	21.25%	44	1.74%	47	1.86%	11	0.44%	1,351	53.46%	2,527
Emmons	3,089	76.29%	916	22.62%	30	0.74%	8	0.20%	6	0.15%	2,173	53.67%	4,049
Foster	1,838	74.38%	609	24.65%	9	0.36%	14	0.57%	1	0.04%	1,229	49.74%	2,471
Golden Valley	1,023	60.35%	653	38.53%	11	0.65%	4	0.24%	4	0.24%	370	21.83%	1,695
Grand Forks	7,579	58.75%	5,090	39.46%	187	1.45%	17	0.13%	27	0.21%	2,489	19.29%	12,900
Grant	2,912	79.69%	657	17.98%	38	1.04%	33	0.90%	14	0.38%	2,255	61.71%	3,654
Griggs	1,838	77.32%	428	18.01%	41	1.72%	60	2.52%	10	0.42%	1,410	59.32%	2,377
Hettinger	2,336	69.57%	921	27.43%	54	1.61%	33	0.98%	14	0.42%	1,415	42.14%	3,358
Kidder	2,042	73.14%	709	25.39%	29	1.04%	4	0.14%	8	0.29%	1,333	47.74%	2,792
LaMoure	3,310	72.22%	1,134	24.74%	88	1.92%	43	0.94%	8	0.17%	2,176	47.48%	4,583
Logan	2,350	84.93%	390	14.09%	11	0.40%	5	0.18%	11	0.40%	1,960	70.83%	2,767
McHenry	3,937	70.73%	1,396	25.08%	166	2.98%	59	1.06%	8	0.14%	2,541	45.65%	5,566
McIntosh	3,078	86.88%	465	13.12%	0	0.00%	0	0.00%	0	0.00%	2,613	73.75%	3,543
McKenzie	2,655	74.85%	710	20.02%	91	2.57%	74	2.09%	17	0.48%	1,945	54.84%	3,547
McLean	4,354	76.08%	1,369	23.92%	0	0.00%	0	0.00%	0	0.00%	2,985	52.16%	5,723
Mercer	2,491	83.23%	480	16.04%	10	0.33%	2	0.07%	10	0.33%	2,011	67.19%	2,993
Morton	5,548	74.67%	1,828	24.60%	38	0.51%	7	0.09%	9	0.12%	3,720	50.07%	7,430
Mountrail	3,284	73.83%	986	22.17%	84	1.89%	15	0.34%	79	1.78%	2,298	51.66%	4,448
Nelson	3,176	76.86%	956	23.14%	0	0.00%	0	0.00%	0	0.00%	2,220	53.73%	4,132
Oliver	1,152	78.42%	302	20.56%	10	0.68%	3	0.20%	2	0.14%	850	57.86%	1,469
Pembina	3,636	65.04%	1,911	34.19%	40	0.72%	3	0.05%	0	0.00%	1,725	30.86%	5,590
Pierce	2,439	73.18%	856	25.68%	32	0.96%	1	0.03%	5	0.15%	1,583	47.49%	3,333
Ramsey	4,337	68.53%	1,917	30.29%	52	0.82%	8	0.13%	15	0.24%	2,420	38.24%	6,329
Ransom	3,025	66.29%	1,445	31.67%	59	1.29%	28	0.61%	6	0.13%	1,580	34.63%	4,563
Renville	1,969	72.10%	689	25.23%	60	2.20%	8	0.29%	5	0.18%	1,280	46.87%	2,731
Richland	5,663	69.20%	2,304	28.16%	173	2.11%	32	0.39%	11	0.13%	3,359	41.05%	8,183
Rolette	2,855	79.22%	706	19.59%	32	0.89%	4	0.11%	7	0.19%	2,149	59.63%	3,604
Sargent	2,818	75.98%	785	21.16%	73	1.97%	25	0.67%	8	0.22%	2,033	54.81%	3,709
Sheridan	1,945	79.29%	468	19.08%	28	1.14%	2	0.08%	10	0.41%	1,477	60.21%	2,453
Sioux	1,328	77.12%	350	20.33%	25	1.45%	12	0.70%	7	0.41%	978	56.79%	1,722
Slope	1,136	68.43%	461	27.77%	49	2.95%	11	0.66%	3	0.18%	675	40.66%	1,660
Stark	4,786	80.72%	1,143	19.28%	0	0.00%	0	0.00%	0	0.00%	3,643	61.44%	5,929
Steele	1,925	71.69%	695	25.88%	26	0.97%	39	1.45%	0	0.00%	1,230	45.81%	2,685
Stutsman	6,182	69.63%	2,577	29.03%	103	1.16%	11	0.12%	5	0.06%	3,605	40.61%	8,878
Towner	2,190	73.02%	765	25.51%	25	0.83%	7	0.23%	12	0.40%	1,425	47.52%	2,999
Traill	3,112	61.33%	1,893	37.31%	51	1.01%	10	0.20%	8	0.16%	1,219	24.02%	5,074
Walsh	5,342	73.74%	1,616	22.31%	133	1.84%	146	2.02%	7	0.10%	3,726	51.44%	7,244
Ward	8,129	64.38%	4,195	33.23%	187	1.48%	47	0.37%	68	0.54%	3,934	31.16%	12,626
Wells	3,823	77.40%	1,062	21.50%	28	0.57%	19	0.38%	7	0.14%	2,761	55.90%	4,939
Williams	4,823	70.06%	1,509	21.92%	74	1.07%	371	5.39%	107	1.55%	3,314	48.14%	6,884
Totals	178,350	69.59%	71,772	28.00%	3,521	1.37%	1,817	0.71%	830	0.32%	106,578	41.58%	256,290

==== Counties that flipped from Republican to Democratic ====
- Adams
- Barnes
- Cass
- Billings
- Bottineau
- Bowman
- Burke
- Burleigh
- Cavalier
- Dickey
- Divide
- Golden Valley
- Grant
- Griggs
- Hettinger
- Kidder
- LaMoure
- McHenry
- McIntosh
- Oliver
- Pembina
- Benson
- Mountrail
- Nelson
- Ramsey
- Ransom
- Renville
- Richland
- Sheridan
- Steele
- Slope
- Stutsman
- Towner
- Traill
- Ward
- Wells
- Williams

== See also ==
- United States presidential elections in North Dakota
