= 1936 United States presidential election in North Dakota =

- November 3, 1936

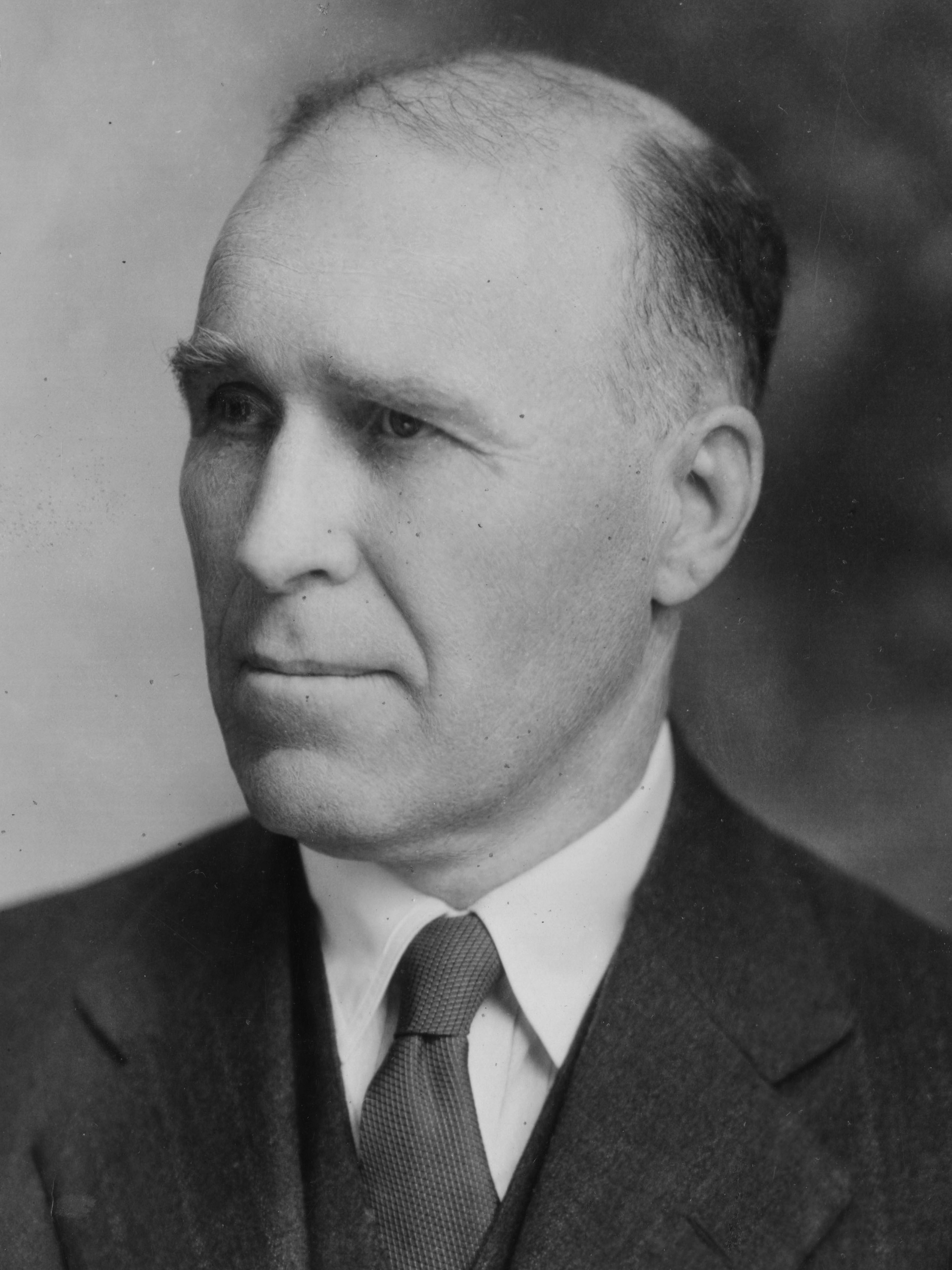
Nominee	Franklin D. Roosevelt	Alf Landon	William Lemke
Party	Democratic	Republican	Union
Home state	New York	Kansas	North Dakota
Running mate	John Nance Garner	Frank Knox	Thomas C. O'Brien
Electoral vote	4	0	0
Popular vote	163,148	72,751	36,708
Percentage	59.60%	26.58%	13.41%
County results
Roosevelt
40–50%
50–60%
60–70%
70–80%

The 1936 United States presidential election in North Dakota took place on November 3, 1936, as part of the 1936 United States presidential election. Voters chose four representatives, or electors, to the Electoral College, who voted for president and vice president.

Ever since statehood, North Dakota had been overwhelmingly Republican at state level and in many presidential elections, although progressive Democrat Woodrow Wilson was able to carry the state in both his campaigns in 1912 and 1916, in the second due to his opposition to American involvement in World War I. In the following three elections, the state's voting would be shaped by its extreme isolationism in the aftermath of the United States ultimately entering the war in 1917 and Wilson's “League of Nations” proposal, to which the Russian Germans who dominated North Dakota's populace at the time were vehemently opposed. North Dakota thus shifted markedly from voting four-to-one for Republican Warren G. Harding against pro-League Democrat James M. Cox in 1920, to being the second-strongest state for Robert M. La Follette under the Nonpartisan League banner in 1924, to Republican Herbert Hoover carrying the state by a comparatively narrow margin over anti-Prohibition Catholic Al Smith in 1928. Severe drought and depression in the following three years turned the state overwhelmingly to Democrat Franklin D. Roosevelt in 1932, despite President Hoover's call to “be safe” by supporting him; at the same time North Dakota elected progressive, pro-New Deal Republicans to fill its House and Senate seats. One of these, Gerald Nye, would say in 1934 that the party needed to

turn its back up “that which has been its undoing, namely the private money bags”.

Roosevelt won North Dakota by a margin of 33.02 percentage points and for the second consecutive election carried every county in the state. As of the 2024 presidential election, this is the last time that a Democratic presidential candidate has carried every county in the state, and the last time that the Democratic candidate carried the following counties: Golden Valley, Grant, Kidder, Logan, McIntosh, Mercer, and Sheridan.

== Results ==
1936 United States presidential election in North Dakota
Party	Candidate	Running mate	Votes	%	Electoral votes
Democratic	Franklin D. Roosevelt	John Nance Garner	163,148	59.60%	4
Republican	Alf Landon	Frank Knox	72,751	26.58%	0
Union	William Lemke	Thomas C. O'Brien	36,708	13.41%	0
Socialist	Norman Thomas	George A. Nelson	552	0.20%	0
Communist	Earl Browder	James W. Ford	360	0.13%	0
Prohibition	D. Leigh Colvin	Claude A. Watson	197	0.07%	0
Total			273,716	100.0%	4

=== Results by county ===
County	Franklin D. Roosevelt Democratic		Alf Landon Republican		William Lemke Union		Norman Thomas Socialist		Earl Browder Communist		D. Leigh Colvin Prohibition		Margin		Total votes cast
County	#	%	#	%	#	%	#	%	#	%	#	%	#	%	Total votes cast
Adams	1,321	54.95%	746	31.03%	310	12.90%	5	0.21%	7	0.29%	15	0.62%	575	23.92%	2,404
Barnes	4,484	57.89%	2,324	30.00%	909	11.74%	17	0.22%	4	0.05%	8	0.10%	2,160	27.89%	7,746
Benson	3,343	62.33%	1,020	19.02%	985	18.37%	11	0.21%	1	0.02%	3	0.06%	2,323	43.32%	5,363
Billings	729	59.17%	329	26.70%	155	12.58%	18	1.46%	1	0.08%	0	0.00%	400	32.47%	1,232
Bottineau	3,286	56.86%	1,224	21.18%	1,236	21.39%	24	0.42%	2	0.03%	7	0.12%	2,050 (Note: In this county where Lemke ran second ahead of Landon, margin given is Roosevelt vote minus Lemke vote and percentage margin Roosevelt percentage minus Lemke percentage.)	35.47%	5,779
Bowman	1,118	55.62%	534	26.57%	346	17.21%	11	0.55%	1	0.05%	0	0.00%	584	29.05%	2,010
Burke	1,821	48.81%	684	18.33%	1,180	31.63%	25	0.67%	17	0.46%	4	0.11%	641	17.18%	3,731
Burleigh	6,314	64.94%	2,447	25.17%	905	9.31%	22	0.23%	27	0.28%	8	0.08%	3,867	39.77%	9,723
Cass	12,400	57.22%	7,632	35.22%	1,548	7.14%	62	0.29%	14	0.06%	14	0.06%	4,768	22.00%	21,670
Cavalier	3,533	60.82%	1,657	28.52%	614	10.57%	1	0.02%	1	0.02%	3	0.05%	1,876	32.29%	5,809
Dickey	2,287	51.30%	1,533	34.39%	595	13.35%	5	0.11%	33	0.74%	5	0.11%	754	16.91%	4,458
Divide	2,212	62.56%	585	16.54%	731	20.67%	4	0.11%	3	0.08%	1	0.03%	1,481	41.88%	3,536
Dunn	2,257	66.76%	732	21.65%	379	11.21%	1	0.03%	11	0.33%	1	0.03%	1,525	45.10%	3,381
Eddy	1,729	63.78%	579	21.36%	382	14.09%	3	0.11%	17	0.63%	1	0.04%	1,150	42.42%	2,711
Emmons	2,424	57.95%	1,117	26.70%	638	15.25%	2	0.05%	2	0.05%	0	0.00%	1,307	31.25%	4,183
Foster	1,894	68.65%	685	24.83%	175	6.34%	4	0.14%	1	0.04%	0	0.00%	1,209	43.82%	2,759
Golden Valley	991	59.73%	581	35.02%	77	4.64%	4	0.24%	6	0.36%	0	0.00%	410	24.71%	1,659
Grand Forks	9,222	63.39%	4,312	29.64%	980	6.74%	17	0.12%	9	0.06%	9	0.06%	4,910	33.75%	14,549
Grant	1,858	53.76%	1,022	29.57%	566	16.38%	6	0.17%	4	0.12%	0	0.00%	836	24.19%	3,456
Griggs	1,665	61.15%	666	24.46%	386	14.18%	2	0.07%	1	0.04%	3	0.11%	999	36.69%	2,723
Hettinger	1,383	41.69%	989	29.82%	937	28.25%	8	0.24%	0	0.00%	0	0.00%	394	11.88%	3,317
Kidder	1,492	50.89%	872	29.74%	561	19.13%	1	0.03%	6	0.20%	0	0.00%	620	21.15%	2,932
LaMoure	2,412	49.52%	1,614	33.13%	826	16.96%	11	0.23%	1	0.02%	7	0.14%	798	16.38%	4,871
Logan	1,292	45.11%	984	34.36%	584	20.39%	1	0.03%	2	0.07%	1	0.03%	308	10.75%	2,864
McHenry	3,294	53.40%	1,619	26.24%	1,222	19.81%	8	0.13%	20	0.32%	6	0.10%	1,675	27.15%	6,169
McIntosh	1,900	52.36%	1,469	40.48%	255	7.03%	2	0.06%	1	0.03%	2	0.06%	431	11.88%	3,629
McKenzie	2,885	74.20%	570	14.66%	409	10.52%	5	0.13%	15	0.39%	4	0.10%	2,315	59.54%	3,888
McLean	4,018	58.55%	1,732	25.24%	1,028	14.98%	64	0.93%	16	0.23%	4	0.06%	2,286	33.31%	6,862
Mercer	1,924	53.16%	1,142	31.56%	548	15.14%	3	0.08%	2	0.06%	0	0.00%	782	21.61%	3,619
Morton	5,612	69.37%	1,857	22.95%	608	7.52%	3	0.04%	3	0.04%	7	0.09%	3,755	46.42%	8,090
Mountrail	2,775	58.19%	700	14.68%	1,227	25.73%	20	0.42%	39	0.82%	8	0.17%	1,548	32.46%	4,769
Nelson	2,954	65.78%	1,002	22.31%	524	11.67%	6	0.13%	3	0.07%	2	0.04%	1,952	43.46%	4,491
Oliver	906	57.60%	469	29.82%	197	12.52%	1	0.06%	0	0.00%	0	0.00%	437	27.78%	1,573
Pembina	4,139	63.86%	2,040	31.48%	293	4.52%	6	0.09%	3	0.05%	0	0.00%	2,099	32.39%	6,481
Pierce	2,168	57.60%	912	24.23%	676	17.96%	4	0.11%	3	0.08%	1	0.03%	1,256	33.37%	3,764
Ramsey	4,559	65.19%	1,784	25.51%	642	9.18%	6	0.09%	1	0.01%	1	0.01%	2,775	39.68%	6,993
Ransom	2,385	55.49%	1,303	30.32%	600	13.96%	5	0.12%	3	0.07%	2	0.05%	1,082	25.17%	4,298
Renville	1,766	61.73%	611	21.36%	444	15.52%	37	1.29%	2	0.07%	1	0.03%	1,155	40.37%	2,861
Richland	3,792	49.92%	2,386	31.41%	1,361	17.92%	47	0.62%	6	0.08%	4	0.05%	1,406	18.51%	7,596
Rolette	3,186	71.89%	857	19.34%	386	8.71%	3	0.07%	0	0.00%	0	0.00%	2,329	52.55%	4,432
Sargent	2,306	64.47%	863	24.13%	397	11.10%	6	0.17%	3	0.08%	2	0.06%	1,443	40.34%	3,577
Sheridan	1,150	41.10%	834	29.81%	808	28.88%	1	0.04%	2	0.07%	3	0.11%	316	11.29%	2,798
Sioux	877	52.70%	585	35.16%	198	11.90%	2	0.12%	2	0.12%	0	0.00%	292	17.55%	1,664
Slope	896	63.05%	331	23.29%	193	13.58%	1	0.07%	0	0.00%	0	0.00%	565	39.76%	1,421
Stark	4,012	65.35%	1,602	26.10%	511	8.32%	8	0.13%	2	0.03%	4	0.07%	2,410	39.26%	6,139
Steele	1,444	50.26%	724	25.20%	698	24.30%	4	0.14%	3	0.10%	0	0.00%	720	25.06%	2,873
Stutsman	5,564	59.39%	2,725	29.09%	1,064	11.36%	11	0.12%	2	0.02%	3	0.03%	2,839	30.30%	9,369
Towner	1,744	54.26%	720	22.40%	743	23.12%	3	0.09%	4	0.12%	0	0.00%	1,001	31.14%	3,214
Traill	2,780	52.76%	1,807	34.29%	666	12.64%	5	0.09%	6	0.11%	5	0.09%	973	18.47%	5,269
Walsh	5,756	70.32%	1,813	22.15%	604	7.38%	8	0.10%	2	0.02%	2	0.02%	3,943	48.17%	8,185
Ward	8,872	63.12%	3,142	22.36%	2,005	14.27%	15	0.11%	13	0.09%	8	0.06%	5,730	40.77%	14,055
Wells	3,114	58.78%	1,263	23.84%	918	17.33%	3	0.06%	0	0.00%	0	0.00%	1,851	34.94%	5,298
Williams	4,903	65.61%	1,021	13.66%	1,478	19.78%	23	0.31%	44	0.59%	4	0.05%	3,425	45.83%	7,473
Totals	163,148	59.60%	72,751	26.58%	36,708	13.41%	552	0.20%	360	0.13%	197	0.07%	90,397	33.03%	273,716

== Analysis ==
Controversial Democratic governor and senator from Louisiana Huey P. Long had planned to run against Roosevelt on his "Share Our Wealth" platform in the 1936 election, but was assassinated in September 1935. The remains of the Share Our Wealth movement were taken over by “radio priest” Charles Coughlin, who nominated North Dakota Congressman William Lemke as the presidential candidate of the new “Union Party” on June 9, whose isolationist platform was vague and Coughlin's personal creation. Lemke had had a long history as a progressive reformer since endorsing Woodrow Wilson in 1912.

A poor campaigner and speaker, Lemke was unable to build his hoped-for “consensus of despair” amongst agrarian radicals, Southern poor whites, Catholics, and the elderly. North Dakota's extreme isolationism and support for its favorite son meant Lemke received 13.41 percent of his home state's vote: over four and a half times the 2.88 percent of on-ballot votes he won nationally. (Note: The Lemke—O‘Brien ticket was not on the ballot in Arkansas, California, Florida, Louisiana, Maryland, Mississippi, Nevada, New York, North Carolina, Oklahoma, South Carolina, Vermont and West Virginia.) Lemke exceeded 28 percent in the counties of Burke, Sheridan and Hettinger, and ran second ahead of Republican nominee Alf Landon in six counties. However, he did not make the impact personally expected when nominated, and unlike elsewhere in the nation, Lemke's best vote was not where ethnic and religious influences might have been expected to give him the largest vote, but in the northwest where local leaders held votes for him. Nonetheless, only Ross Perot in 1992 and Evan McMullin in 2016 have since equaled Lemke's performance for a third-party candidate in any non-Southern county. (Note: Between 1948 and 1968 inclusive, the political impact of the Civil Rights Movement meant unpledged and "Dixiecrat" nominees frequently exceeded Lemke’s best performance and outpolled one or both major-party nominees in the Deep South and occasionally elsewhere in antebellum slave states.)

== See also ==
- United States presidential elections in North Dakota
