= 1928 United States presidential election in North Dakota =

- November 6, 1928

Nominee	Herbert Hoover	Al Smith
Party	Republican	Democratic
Home state	California	New York
Running mate	Charles Curtis	Joseph T. Robinson
Electoral vote	5	0
Popular vote	131,441	106,148
Percentage	54.80%	44.46%
County results
Hoover
40–50%
50–60%
60–70%
70–80%
Smith
40–50%
50–60%
60–70%
President before election
Calvin Coolidge
Republican
Elected President
Herbert Hoover
Republican

The 1928 United States presidential election in North Dakota took place on November 6, 1928, as part of the 1928 United States presidential election which was held throughout all contemporary 48 states. Voters chose five representatives, or electors to the Electoral College, who voted for president and vice president.

Ever since statehood, North Dakota had been overwhelmingly Republican at state level and in many presidential elections, although progressive Democrat Woodrow Wilson was able to carry the state in both his campaigns in 1912 and 1916, in the second due to his anti-war platform. In the following two elections, the state's voting would be shaped by its extreme isolationism in the aftermath of President Wilson's pushing of the nation into World War I and his “League of Nations” proposal, to which the Russian-Germans who dominated North Dakota's populace were vehemently opposed. To North Dakota's predominantly German-American populace, Wilson's entry into the war and his support for the Treaty of Versailles was a betrayal, and farmers were also faced with a postwar agricultural depression as prices fell with reduced demand in Europe. Consequently, North Dakota went for the isolationist Republican Warren G. Harding over the pro-League Democrat James M. Cox by four-to-one in 1920. In 1924, Robert M. La Follette under the Nonpartisan League banner attracted North Dakota's isolationist electorate so strongly that he went within two percentage points of carrying the state. When La Follette died in 1925, his family did not endorse a Republican, but rather New York City Catholic Democrat Al Smith.

== Results ==
Presidential Candidate	Running Mate	Party	Electoral Vote (EV)	Popular Vote (PV)	
Herbert Hoover of California	Charles Curtis	Republican	5	131,441	54.80%
Al Smith	Joseph T. Robinson	Democratic	0	106,648	44.46%
Norman Thomas	James Maurer	Social Production and Distribution	0	936	0.39%
William Z. Foster	Benjamin Gitlow	Workers’ and Farmers’ Government	0	842	0.35%

=== Results by county ===
County	Herbert Hoover Republican		Al Smith Democratic		Norman M. Thomas Social Production and Distribution		William Z. Foster Workers’ and Farmers’ Government		Margin		Total votes cast
County	#	%	#	%	#	%	#	%	#	%	Total votes cast
Adams	1,590	70.67%	644	28.62%	13	0.58%	3	0.13%	946	42.04%	2,250
Barnes	3,755	53.01%	3,293	46.49%	15	0.21%	20	0.28%	462	6.52%	7,083
Benson	2,621	53.80%	2,194	45.03%	13	0.27%	44	0.90%	427	8.76%	4,872
Billings	458	52.22%	412	46.98%	6	0.68%	1	0.11%	46	5.25%	877
Bottineau	2,680	49.79%	2,648	49.19%	13	0.24%	42	0.78%	32	0.59%	5,383
Bowman	1,031	54.99%	821	43.79%	12	0.64%	11	0.59%	210	11.20%	1,875
Burke	2,002	58.38%	1,336	38.96%	70	2.04%	21	0.61%	666	19.42%	3,429
Burleigh	3,955	55.59%	3,076	43.23%	68	0.96%	16	0.22%	879	12.35%	7,115
Cass	12,480	66.18%	6,315	33.49%	14	0.07%	49	0.26%	6,165	32.69%	18,858
Cavalier	3,068	54.86%	2,510	44.89%	11	0.20%	3	0.05%	558	9.98%	5,592
Dickey	2,250	52.90%	1,977	46.48%	11	0.26%	15	0.35%	273	6.42%	4,253
Divide	1,963	60.36%	1,250	38.44%	25	0.77%	14	0.43%	713	21.92%	3,252
Dunn	1,360	46.50%	1,561	53.37%	4	0.14%	0	0.00%	-201	-6.87%	2,925
Eddy	1,071	46.12%	1,240	53.40%	9	0.39%	2	0.09%	-169	-7.28%	2,322
Emmons	1,792	46.25%	2,066	53.32%	12	0.31%	5	0.13%	-274	-7.07%	3,875
Foster	1,137	48.99%	1,178	50.75%	5	0.22%	1	0.04%	-41	-1.77%	2,321
Golden Valley	937	63.78%	522	35.53%	4	0.27%	6	0.41%	415	28.25%	1,469
Grand Forks	8,024	64.86%	4,300	34.76%	15	0.12%	32	0.26%	3,724	30.10%	12,371
Grant	1,759	54.59%	1,434	44.51%	14	0.43%	15	0.47%	325	10.09%	3,222
Griggs	1,329	52.45%	1,182	46.65%	13	0.51%	10	0.39%	147	5.80%	2,534
Hettinger	1,553	53.87%	1,323	45.89%	4	0.14%	3	0.10%	230	7.98%	2,883
Kidder	1,200	49.94%	1,190	49.52%	6	0.25%	7	0.29%	10	0.42%	2,403
LaMoure	2,245	55.00%	1,800	44.10%	16	0.39%	21	0.51%	445	10.90%	4,082
Logan	1,013	43.64%	1,293	55.71%	14	0.60%	1	0.04%	-280	-12.06%	2,321
McHenry	2,914	53.04%	2,535	46.14%	21	0.38%	24	0.44%	379	6.90%	5,494
McIntosh	1,196	44.79%	1,474	55.21%	0	0.00%	0	0.00%	-278	-10.41%	2,670
McKenzie	2,100	61.14%	1,289	37.53%	35	1.02%	11	0.32%	811	23.61%	3,435
McLean	2,730	47.51%	2,855	49.69%	21	0.37%	140	2.44%	-125	-2.18%	5,746
Mercer	971	37.45%	1,619	62.44%	3	0.12%	0	0.00%	-648	-24.99%	2,593
Morton	2,881	42.04%	3,946	57.58%	17	0.25%	9	0.13%	-1,065	-15.54%	6,853
Mountrail	2,354	52.30%	2,003	44.50%	108	2.40%	36	0.80%	351	7.80%	4,501
Nelson	2,364	60.18%	1,542	39.26%	11	0.28%	11	0.28%	822	20.93%	3,928
Oliver	680	51.67%	631	47.95%	4	0.30%	1	0.08%	49	3.72%	1,316
Pembina	3,324	60.75%	2,141	39.13%	7	0.13%	0	0.00%	1,183	21.62%	5,472
Pierce	1,469	47.60%	1,606	52.04%	5	0.16%	6	0.19%	-137	-4.44%	3,086
Ramsey	3,246	54.62%	2,672	44.96%	8	0.13%	17	0.29%	574	9.66%	5,943
Ransom	2,613	60.43%	1,505	34.81%	198	4.58%	8	0.19%	1,108	25.62%	4,324
Renville	1,473	55.09%	1,174	43.90%	15	0.56%	12	0.45%	299	11.18%	2,674
Richland	4,251	53.89%	3,604	45.68%	15	0.19%	19	0.24%	647	8.20%	7,889
Rolette	1,327	37.50%	2,181	61.63%	12	0.34%	19	0.54%	-854	-24.13%	3,539
Sargent	1,772	46.88%	1,989	52.62%	11	0.29%	8	0.21%	-217	-5.74%	3,780
Sheridan	1,242	56.61%	944	43.03%	1	0.05%	7	0.32%	298	13.58%	2,194
Sioux	687	40.46%	988	58.19%	14	0.82%	9	0.53%	-301	-17.73%	1,698
Slope	873	60.88%	542	37.80%	10	0.70%	9	0.63%	331	23.08%	1,434
Stark	1,924	37.28%	3,231	62.60%	4	0.08%	2	0.04%	-1,307	-25.32%	5,161
Steele	1,574	57.34%	1,152	41.97%	6	0.22%	13	0.47%	422	15.37%	2,745
Stutsman	4,782	55.07%	3,873	44.60%	16	0.18%	13	0.15%	909	10.47%	8,684
Towner	1,588	54.23%	1,324	45.22%	12	0.41%	4	0.14%	264	9.02%	2,928
Traill	3,638	71.36%	1,447	28.38%	5	0.10%	8	0.16%	2,191	42.98%	5,098
Walsh	3,657	48.94%	3,798	50.83%	8	0.11%	9	0.12%	-141	-1.89%	7,472
Ward	6,561	59.72%	4,362	39.71%	22	0.20%	41	0.37%	2,199	20.02%	10,986
Wells	2,364	52.39%	2,123	47.05%	18	0.40%	7	0.16%	241	5.34%	4,512
Williams	3,591	57.25%	2,503	39.91%	121	1.93%	57	0.91%	1,088	17.35%	6,272
Totals	131,419	54.79%	106,648	44.47%	936	0.39%	842	0.35%	24,771	10.33%	239,845

== Analysis ==
Despite much antagonism with the Catholic Church amongst the German and Scandinavian Lutherans in North Dakota, Smith would capitalize extremely well upon La Folette's endorsement, due to the state being the most Catholic in the Midwest and a concurrent statewide repeal of Prohibition with the election, further adding to support for the “wet” Smith. The local press in mid-September believed Smith would carry North Dakota. and he later received further endorsement from the Nonpartisan League despite opposition from Senators Lynn J. Frazier and Gerald P. Nye. Smith visited the state during his midwestern tour in late September and early October, but during October the lessened unpopularity with farmers of Republican nominee Herbert Hoover’s led pundits to imagine the GOP would retain the state.

In the days leading up to the actual poll, forecasts suggested Hoover would retain North Dakota for the GOP, and he did this by a margin of 10.33 percent. Despite losing the state, Smith made a massive advance upon James M. Cox’ and John W. Davis’ performances earlier in the decade. Whereas North Dakota had been Cox’ and Davis’ second-weakest state in 1920 and 1924, it voted 7.07 points more Democratic than the nation at-large in 1928. In some counties that were largely Lutheran, Smith still made tremendous gains because of his opposition to Prohibition, which was powerfully opposed by liturgical German Lutherans. This allowed Smith to become the first Democrat to carry McIntosh County – which had been the nation's most Republican county in 1920 and where no Democrat had previously gained over 22 percent of the vote – Logan County, Mercer County, Morton County and Sioux County.

== See also ==
- United States presidential elections in North Dakota
