= Roloff Township, McIntosh County, North Dakota =

Coordinates: 46°13′30″N 99°04′31″W

Roloff Township is the sole township of McIntosh County, North Dakota, United States; the rest of the county is unorganized territory. It lies in the northeastern corner of the county and borders the following other townships:

- Haag Township, Logan County — north
- Norden Township, LaMoure County — northeast
- Northwest Township, Dickey County — east
- German Township, Dickey County — southeast corner
