= Martin, North Dakota =

- City
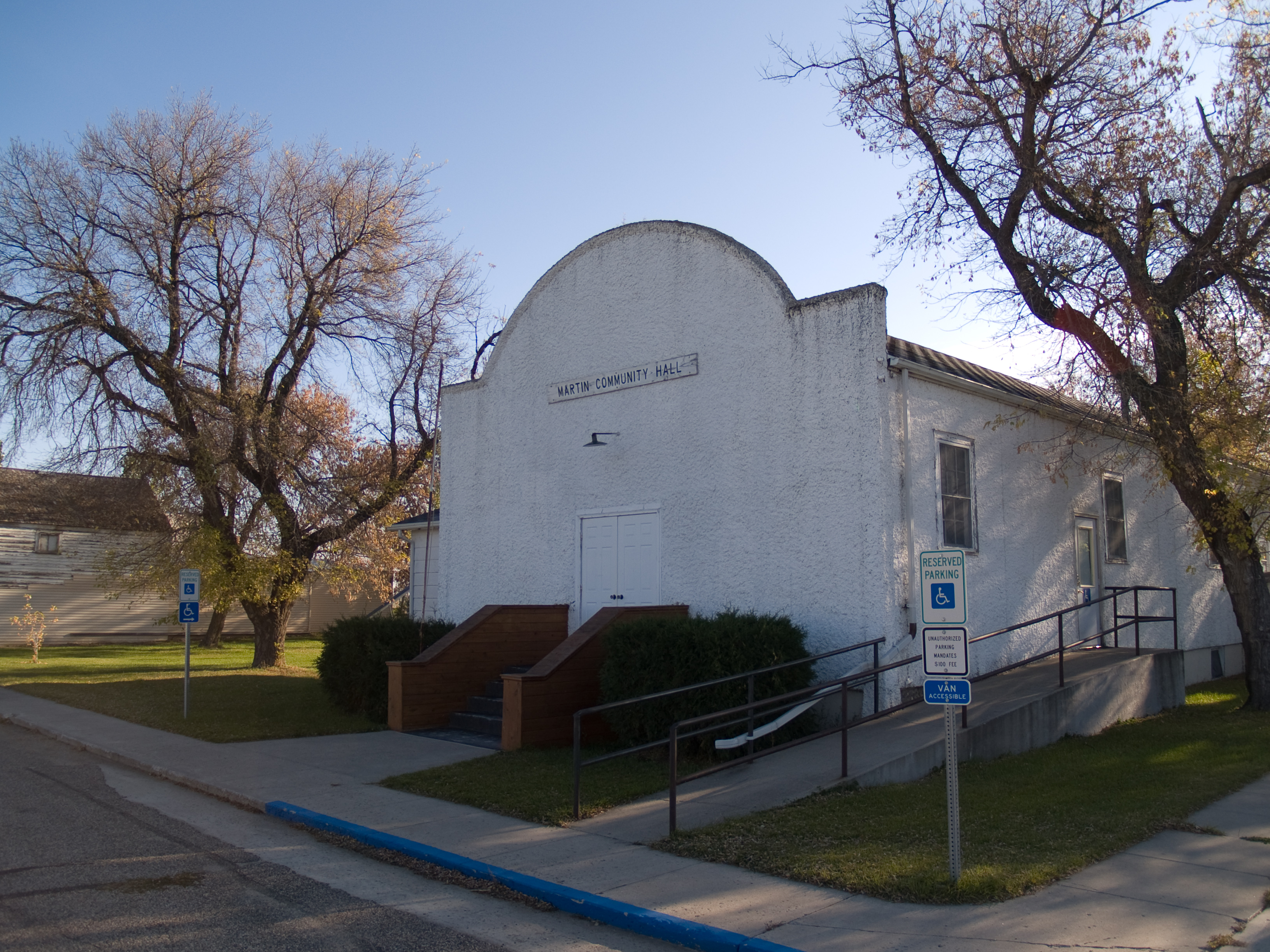
- Martin Community Hall - Martin, North Dakota

- Location of Martin, North Dakota
- Coordinates: 47°49′36″N 100°06′55″W
- Country: United States
- State: North Dakota
- County: Sheridan
- Founded: 1898

Area
  - Total: 0.089 sq mi (0.23 km^{2})
  - Land: 0.089 sq mi (0.23 km^{2})
  - Water: 0 sq mi (0.00 km^{2})
- Elevation: 1,627 ft (496 m)

Population (2020)
  - Total: 63
  - Estimate (2022): 62
  - Density: 707.9/sq mi (273.32/km^{2})
- Time zone: UTC-6 (CST)
  - Summer (DST): UTC-5 (CDT)
- ZIP code: 58758
- Area code: 701
- FIPS code: 38-51060
- GNIS feature ID: 1036152

Martin is a city in Sheridan County, North Dakota, United States. The population was 63 at the 2020 census.

== Geography ==
According to the United States Census Bureau, the city has a total area of 0.09 square miles (0.23 km^{2}), all land.

== Demographics ==
Historical population
Census	Pop.	Note	%±
1920	198		—
1930	211		6.6%
1940	228		8.1%
1950	171		−25.0%
1960	146		−14.6%
1970	120		−17.8%
1980	114		−5.0%
1990	117		2.6%
2000	96		−17.9%
2010	78		−18.7%
2020	63		−19.2%
2022 (est.)	62		−1.6%
U.S. Decennial Census; 2020 Census

=== 2010 census ===
As of the census of 2010, there were 78 people, 38 households, and 23 families residing in the city. The population density was 866.7 inhabitants per square mile (334.6/km^{2}). There were 43 housing units at an average density of 477.8 per square mile (184.5/km^{2}). The racial makeup of the city was 100.0% White.

There were 38 households, of which 23.7% had children under the age of 18 living with them, 52.6% were married couples living together, 5.3% had a female householder with no husband present, 2.6% had a male householder with no wife present, and 39.5% were non-families. 36.8% of all households were made up of individuals, and 15.8% had someone living alone who was 65 years of age or older. The average household size was 2.05 and the average family size was 2.65.

The median age in the city was 48.8 years. 19.2% of residents were under the age of 18; 1.2% were between the ages of 18 and 24; 24.4% were from 25 to 44; 35.9% were from 45 to 64; and 19.2% were 65 years of age or older. The gender makeup of the city was 48.7% male and 51.3% female.

=== 2000 census ===
As of the census of 2000, there were 96 people, 44 households, and 26 families residing in the city. The population density was 1,094.7 inhabitants per square mile (422.7/km^{2}). There were 48 housing units at an average density of 547.4 per square mile (211.4/km^{2}). The racial makeup of the city was 100.00% White. Hispanic or Latino of any race were 1.04% of the population.

There were 44 households, out of which 27.3% had children under the age of 18 living with them, 45.5% were married couples living together, 11.4% had a female householder with no husband present, and 40.9% were non-families. 38.6% of all households were made up of individuals, and 20.5% had someone living alone who was 65 years of age or older. The average household size was 2.18 and the average family size was 2.85.

In the city, the population was spread out, with 24.0% under the age of 18, 5.2% from 18 to 24, 24.0% from 25 to 44, 19.8% from 45 to 64, and 27.1% who were 65 years of age or older. The median age was 43 years. For every 100 females, there were 84.6 males. For every 100 females age 18 and over, there were 87.2 males.

The median income for a household in the city was $28,438, and the median income for a family was $35,313. Males had a median income of $30,000 versus $18,750 for females. The per capita income for the city was $15,767. There were 8.0% of families and 17.4% of the population living below the poverty line, including 21.7% of under eighteens and none of those over 64.

== Climate ==
This climatic region is typified by large seasonal temperature differences, with warm to hot (and often humid) summers and cold (sometimes severely cold) winters. According to the Köppen Climate Classification system, Martin has a humid continental climate, abbreviated "Dfb" on climate maps.
