= McIntosh County, North Dakota =

County in North Dakota, United States

- County
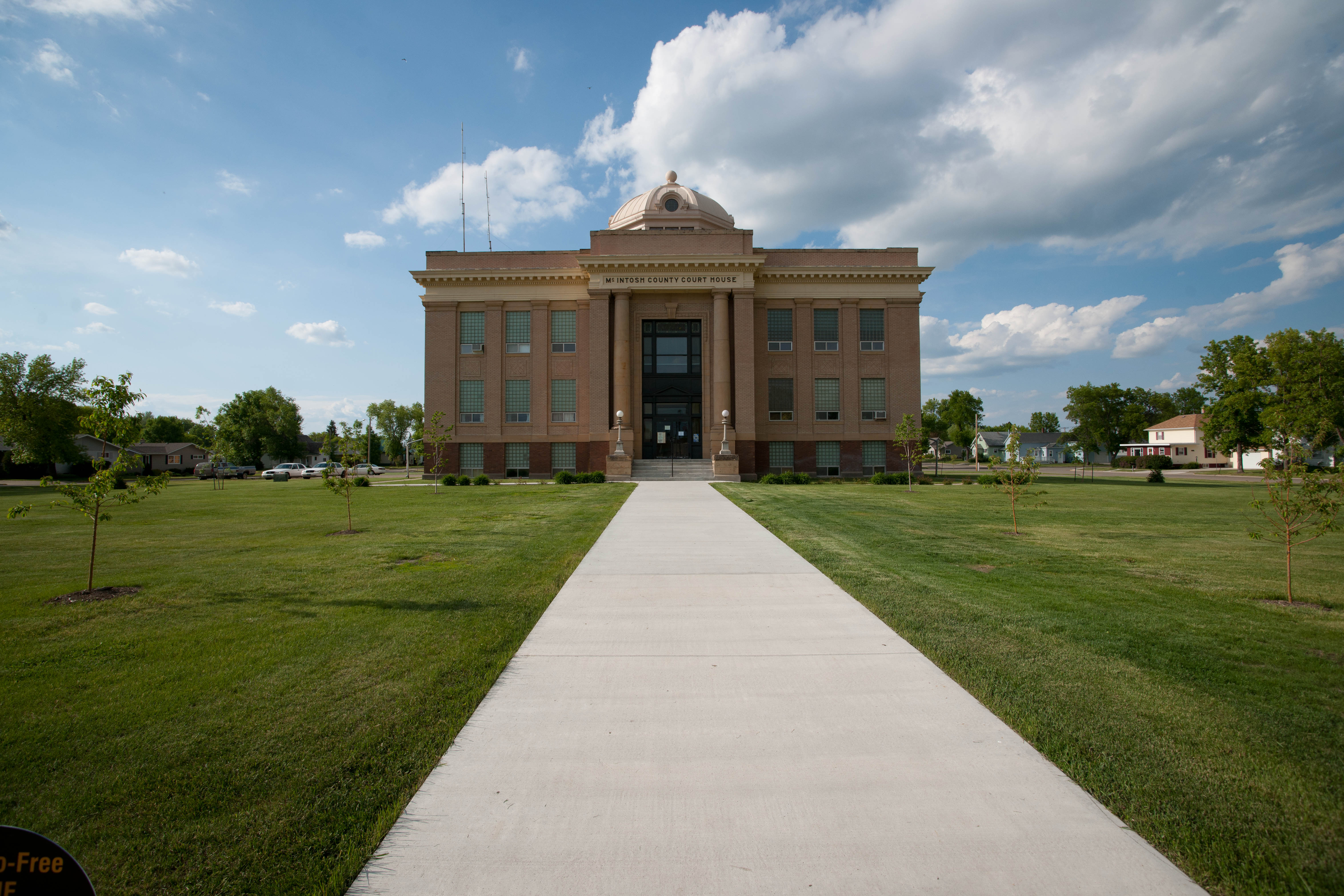
- The McIntosh County Courthouse in Ashley

- Location within the U.S. state of North Dakota
- Coordinates: 46.108682°N 99.416487°W
- Country: United States
- State: North Dakota
- Founded: March 9, 1883 (created); October 4, 1884 (organized)
- Named for: Edward H. McIntosh
- Seat: Ashley
- Largest city: Wishek

Area
  - Total: 994.561 sq mi (2,575.90 km^{2})
  - Land: 974.563 sq mi (2,524.11 km^{2})
  - Water: 19.998 sq mi (51.79 km^{2}) 2.05%

Population (2020)
  - Total: 2,530
  - Estimate (2025): 2,451 ▼
  - Density: 2.525/sq mi (0.975/km^{2})
- Time zone: UTC−6 (Central)
  - Summer (DST): UTC−5 (CDT)
- Area code: 701
- Congressional district: At-large
- Website: mcintoshnd.com

McIntosh County is a county in the U.S. state of North Dakota. As of the 2020 census, the population was 2,530, and was estimated to be 2,451 in 2025. The county seat is Ashley and the largest city is Wishek.

The county is notable for being the county with the highest percentage of German-Americans in the United States, with over 76% of the county's residents being of German descent as of 2010.

== History ==
The Dakota Territory legislature created the county on March 9, 1883, with areas partitioned from Campbell, Logan, and McPherson counties, and with some previously unorganized areas. It was named for Edward H. McIntosh, a territorial legislator at the time. The county seat was originally Hoskins, but changed in 1888 after everything in Hoskins but the school was moved three miles east to the new Soo Line Railroad townsite of Ashley. The county government was not organized at that date, but the new county was not attached to another county for judicial or administrative purposes. Its government was organized on October 4, 1884.

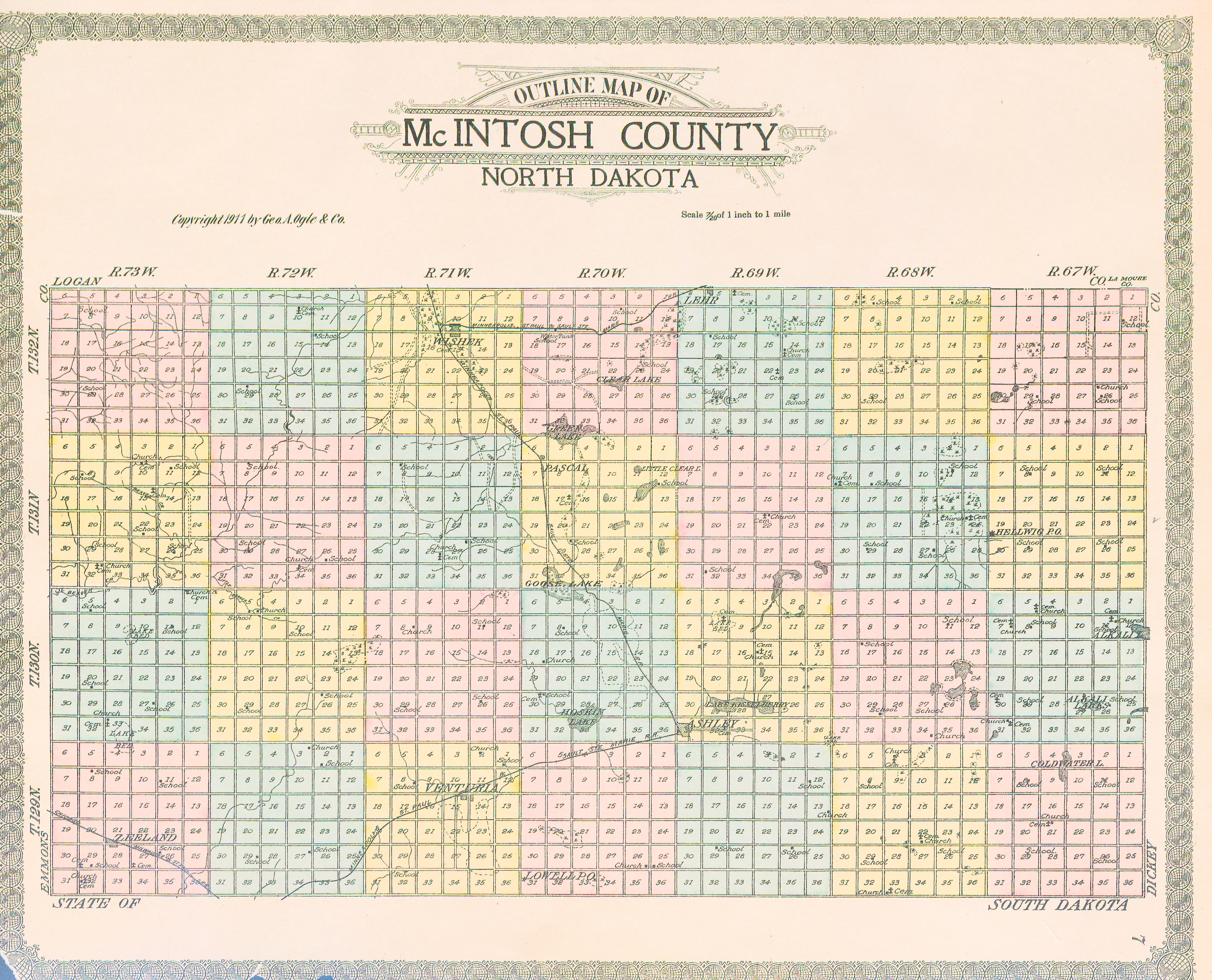
Outline map of McIntosh County, North Dakota, 1911

== Geography ==
McIntosh County lies on the south line of North Dakota. Its south boundary line abuts the north boundary line of the state of South Dakota. The terrain consists of rolling hills dotted with lakes and ponds, and with occasional protuberances. The terrain slopes to the south, with its highest point on the north line at 2,156 ft (657 m) ASL.

According to the United States Census Bureau, the county has a total area of 994.561 square miles (2,575.90 km^{2}), of which 974.563 square miles (2,524.11 km^{2}) is land and 19.998 square miles (51.79 km^{2}) (2.05%) is water. It is the 42nd largest county in North Dakota by total area.

=== Major highways ===
- North Dakota Highway 3
- North Dakota Highway 11
- North Dakota Highway 13

=== Adjacent counties ===
- Logan County - north
- LaMoure County - northeast
- Dickey County - east
- McPherson County, South Dakota - south
- Campbell County, South Dakota - southwest
- Emmons County - west

=== Protected areas ===
- Camp Lake State Game Management Area
- Doyle Memorial State Recreation Area
- Green Lake State Game Management Area
- McIntosh County State Wildlife Management Area
- National Waterfowl Production Area

=== Lakes ===
- Camp Lake
- Coldwater Lake
- Goose Lake
- Green Lake
- Kislingburg Lake
- Lake Hoskins
- May Lake
- Miller Lake
- Pudwill Lake
- Salt Lake
- Tschetter Lake

== Demographics ==
Historical population
Census	Pop.	Note	%±
1890	3,248		—
1900	4,818		48.3%
1910	7,251		50.5%
1920	9,010		24.3%
1930	9,621		6.8%
1940	8,984		−6.6%
1950	7,590		−15.5%
1960	6,702		−11.7%
1970	5,545		−17.3%
1980	4,800		−13.4%
1990	4,021		−16.2%
2000	3,390		−15.7%
2010	2,809		−17.1%
2020	2,530		−9.9%
2025 (est.)	2,451	▼	−3.1%
U.S. Decennial Census; 1790–1960 1900–1990; 1990–2000 2010–2020

As of the fourth quarter of 2024, the median home value in McIntosh County was $85,082.

As of the 2023 American Community Survey, there are 1,191 estimated households in McIntosh County with an average of 2.02 persons per household. The county has a median household income of $64,236. Approximately 13.5% of the county's population lives at or below the poverty line. McIntosh County has an estimated 59.9% employment rate, with 17.0% of the population holding a bachelor's degree or higher and 88.4% holding a high school diploma.

The top five reported ancestries (people were allowed to report up to two ancestries, thus the figures will generally add to more than 100%) were English (85.0%), Spanish (2.2%), Indo-European (10.2%), Asian and Pacific Islander (2.0%), and Other (0.5%).

McIntosh County, North Dakota – racial and ethnic composition
Note: the US Census treats Hispanic/Latino as an ethnic category. This table excludes Latinos from the racial categories and assigns them to a separate category. Hispanics/Latinos may be of any race.

Race / ethnicity (NH = non-Hispanic)	Pop. 1980	Pop. 1990	Pop. 2000	Pop. 2010	Pop. 2020
White alone (NH)	4,774 (99.46%)	4,002 (99.53%)	3,329 (98.20%)	2,725 (97.01%)	2,375 (93.87%)
Black or African American alone (NH)	0 (0.00%)	1 (0.02%)	0 (0.00%)	6 (0.21%)	7 (0.28%)
Native American or Alaska Native alone (NH)	3 (0.06%)	6 (0.15%)	5 (0.15%)	12 (0.43%)	5 (0.20%)
Asian alone (NH)	0 (0.00%)	6 (0.15%)	9 (0.27%)	10 (0.36%)	23 (0.91%)
Pacific Islander alone (NH)	—	—	1 (0.03%)	0 (0.00%)	0 (0.00%)
Other race alone (NH)	11 (0.23%)	0 (0.00%)	0 (0.00%)	0 (0.00%)	8 (0.32%)
Mixed race or multiracial (NH)	—	—	18 (0.53%)	18 (0.64%)	59 (2.33%)
Hispanic or Latino (any race)	12 (0.25%)	6 (0.15%)	28 (0.83%)	38 (1.35%)	53 (2.09%)
Total	4,800 (100.00%)	4,021 (100.00%)	3,390 (100.00%)	2,809 (100.00%)	2,530 (100.00%)

=== 2024 estimate ===
As of the 2024 estimate, there were 2,461 people and 1,191 households residing in the county. There were 1,694 housing units at an average density of 1.74 per square mile (0.7/km^{2}). The racial makeup of the county was 95.2% White (92.1% NH White), 1.2% African American, 1.3% Native American, 1.0% Asian, 0.0% Pacific Islander, _% from some other races and 1.2% from two or more races. Hispanic or Latino people of any race were 3.7% of the population.

=== 2020 census ===
As of the 2020 census, there were 2,530 people, 1,177 households, and 675 families residing in the county. The population density was 2.60 inhabitants per square mile (1.0/km^{2}). There were 1,704 housing units at an average density of 1.75 per square mile (0.7/km^{2}); 30.9% of those units were vacant. Among occupied housing units, 82.0% were owner-occupied and 18.0% were renter-occupied. The homeowner vacancy rate was 4.1% and the rental vacancy rate was 27.1%. Of the residents, 18.8% were under the age of 18 and 32.1% were 65 years of age or older; the median age was 54.7 years. For every 100 females there were 102.9 males, and for every 100 females age 18 and over there were 98.6 males. The racial makeup of the county was 94.5% White, 0.3% Black or African American, 0.3% American Indian and Alaska Native, 0.9% Asian, 1.1% from some other race, and 2.9% from two or more races. Hispanic or Latino residents of any race comprised 2.1% of the population. There were 1,177 households in the county, of which 18.9% had children under the age of 18 living with them and 23.4% had a female householder with no spouse or partner present. About 39.2% of all households were made up of individuals and 21.7% had someone living alone who was 65 years of age or older. The most reported ancestries in 2020 were:

- German (59.6%)
- Russian (8.3%)
- English (6.4%)
- Irish (5.2%)
- Norwegian (5.2%)
- Swedish (1.7%)
- Mexican (1.7%)
- French (1.5%)
- Polish (1.1%)
- Scottish (1%)

=== 2010 census ===
Languages (2010)	Percent
Spoke English at home	74.22%
Spoke German at home	24.70%
Spoke Spanish at home	0.94%
Spoke a Scandinavian language at home	0.11%
Spoke French at home	0.04%

As of the 2010 census, there were 2,809 people, 1,307 households, and 800 families residing in the county. The population density was 2.88 inhabitants per square mile (1.1/km^{2}). There were 1,858 housing units at an average density of 1.91 per square mile (0.7/km^{2}). The racial makeup of the county was 98.08% White, 0.21% African American, 0.43% Native American, 0.39% Asian, 0.00% Pacific Islander, 0.25% from some other races and 0.64% from two or more races. Hispanic or Latino people of any race were 1.35% of the population.

In terms of ancestry, 76.8% were German, 26.9% were Russian, 6.2% were Norwegian, and 5.2% were American.

There were 1,307 households, 19.4% had children under the age of 18 living with them, 55.0% were married couples living together, 3.5% had a female householder with no husband present, 38.8% were non-families, and 36.2% of all households were made up of individuals. The average household size was 2.07 and the average family size was 2.66. The median age was 52.7 years.

The median income for a household in the county was $34,904 and the median income for a family was $46,198. Males had a median income of $35,200 versus $23,594 for females. The per capita income for the county was $22,608. About 9.2% of families and 13.9% of the population were below the poverty line, including 9.7% of those under age 18 and 20.2% of those age 65 or over.

== Communities ==
=== Cities ===
- Ashley (county seat)
- Lehr (partly in Logan County)
- Venturia
- Wishek
- Zeeland

=== Township ===
- Roloff

== Politics ==
McIntosh County is a powerfully Republican county. The only Democrats to carry McIntosh County have been Franklin D. Roosevelt in 1936 and 1932, plus Al Smith in 1928. In 1920, 1940, 1944. and 1952 elections the Republican presidential candidate received over ninety percent of the county's vote. Although shifting somewhat Democratic in more recent Presidential elections (owing to German isolationist resentment of US wars in the Middle East), John McCain received nearly sixty percent of the county's vote in the 2008 U.S. presidential election. Donald Trump won seventy-six percent of the vote in 2016, the best result in the county since Ronald Reagan.

The county is represented in the US House of Representatives by Republican Kelly Armstrong. As part of District 28 it is represented in the North Dakota Senate by Robert S. Erbele (R) and in the North Dakota House of Representatives by Mike Brandenburg (R) and Jeffery Magrum (R).

United States presidential election results for McIntosh County, North Dakota
Year	Republican		Democratic		Third party(ies)	
Year	No.	%	No.	%	No.	%
1900	658	84.04%	125	15.96%	0	0.00%
1904	736	92.46%	58	7.29%	2	0.25%
1908	927	86.47%	140	13.06%	5	0.47%
1912	202	20.98%	125	12.98%	636	66.04%
1916	950	77.36%	270	21.99%	8	0.65%
1920	1,782	94.34%	79	4.18%	28	1.48%
1924	637	34.45%	39	2.11%	1,173	63.44%
1928	1,196	44.79%	1,474	55.21%	0	0.00%
1932	465	13.12%	3,078	86.88%	0	0.00%
1936	1,469	40.48%	1,900	52.36%	260	7.16%
1940	3,494	91.66%	318	8.34%	0	0.00%
1944	2,682	91.98%	226	7.75%	8	0.27%
1948	2,203	79.36%	513	18.48%	60	2.16%
1952	3,043	90.89%	276	8.24%	29	0.87%
1956	2,689	84.22%	498	15.60%	6	0.19%
1960	2,694	81.10%	628	18.90%	0	0.00%
1964	1,891	66.56%	950	33.44%	0	0.00%
1968	2,258	82.65%	342	12.52%	132	4.83%
1972	2,440	81.61%	521	17.42%	29	0.97%
1976	1,785	64.30%	912	32.85%	79	2.85%
1980	2,471	86.01%	308	10.72%	94	3.27%
1984	2,047	81.46%	427	16.99%	39	1.55%
1988	1,726	73.54%	598	25.48%	23	0.98%
1992	1,134	55.21%	450	21.91%	470	22.88%
1996	1,005	56.43%	470	26.39%	306	17.18%
2000	1,178	71.96%	350	21.38%	109	6.66%
2004	1,254	72.82%	436	25.32%	32	1.86%
2008	916	59.79%	579	37.79%	37	2.42%
2012	1,035	67.65%	459	30.00%	36	2.35%
2016	1,100	76.07%	235	16.25%	111	7.68%
2020	1,153	79.24%	261	17.94%	41	2.82%
2024	1,132	81.44%	229	16.47%	29	2.09%

== See also ==
- National Register of Historic Places listings in McIntosh County ND
