= 1960 United States presidential election in North Dakota =

- November 8, 1960

Nominee	Richard Nixon	John F. Kennedy
Party	Republican	Democratic-NPL
Home state	California	Massachusetts
Running mate	Henry Cabot Lodge Jr.	Lyndon B. Johnson
Electoral vote	4	0
Popular vote	154,310	123,963
Percentage	55.42%	44.52%
County results
Nixon
50–60%
60–70%
70–80%
80–90%
Kennedy
40–50%
50–60%
60–70%
President before election
Dwight D. Eisenhower
Republican
Elected President
John F. Kennedy
Democratic

The 1960 United States presidential election in North Dakota took place on November 8, 1960, as part of the 1960 United States presidential election. Voters chose four representatives, or electors, to the Electoral College, who voted for president and vice president.

North Dakota was won by incumbent Vice President Richard Nixon (R–California), running with United States Ambassador to the United Nations Henry Cabot Lodge Jr., with 55.42% of the popular vote, against Senator John F. Kennedy (D–Massachusetts), running with Senator Lyndon B. Johnson, with 44.52% of the popular vote, a 10.90% margin of victory.

== Results ==
1960 United States presidential election in North Dakota
Party	Candidate	Votes	%
Republican	Richard Nixon	154,310	55.42%
Democratic–NPL	John F. Kennedy	123,963	44.52%
Socialist Workers	Farrell Dobbs	158	0.06%
Total votes		278,431	100%

=== Results by county ===
County	Richard Nixon Republican		John F. Kennedy Democratic-NPL		Farrell Dobbs Socialist Workers		Margin		Total votes cast
County	#	%	#	%	#	%	#	%	Total votes cast
Adams	1,232	59.69%	832	40.31%	0	0.00%	400	19.38%	2,064
Barnes	4,403	57.71%	3,223	42.25%	3	0.04%	1,180	15.46%	7,629
Benson	2,259	50.84%	2,181	49.09%	3	0.07%	78	1.75%	4,443
Billings	368	47.92%	400	52.08%	0	0.00%	-32	-4.16%	768
Bottineau	3,092	61.00%	1,974	38.94%	3	0.06%	1,118	22.06%	5,069
Bowman	1,038	54.98%	847	44.86%	3	0.16%	191	10.12%	1,888
Burke	1,609	59.88%	1,076	40.04%	2	0.07%	533	19.84%	2,687
Burleigh	9,492	62.13%	5,761	37.71%	25	0.16%	3,731	24.42%	15,278
Cass	17,498	58.89%	12,213	41.11%	0	0.00%	5,285	17.78%	29,711
Cavalier	2,430	51.23%	2,312	48.75%	1	0.02%	118	2.48%	4,743
Dickey	2,420	62.76%	1,433	37.16%	3	0.08%	987	25.60%	3,856
Divide	1,348	51.95%	1,243	47.90%	4	0.15%	105	4.05%	2,595
Dunn	1,462	52.53%	1,321	47.47%	0	0.00%	141	5.06%	2,783
Eddy	1,188	50.73%	1,152	49.19%	2	0.09%	36	1.54%	2,342
Emmons	1,785	46.42%	2,058	53.52%	2	0.05%	-273	-7.10%	3,845
Foster	1,351	53.34%	1,182	46.66%	0	0.00%	169	6.68%	2,533
Golden Valley	825	55.04%	672	44.83%	2	0.13%	153	10.21%	1,499
Grand Forks	10,997	56.85%	8,341	43.12%	5	0.03%	2,656	13.73%	19,343
Grant	1,794	65.21%	955	34.71%	2	0.07%	839	30.50%	2,751
Griggs	1,278	49.90%	1,279	49.94%	4	0.16%	-1	-0.04%	2,561
Hettinger	1,541	55.79%	1,219	44.13%	2	0.07%	322	11.66%	2,762
Kidder	1,574	64.43%	868	35.53%	1	0.04%	706	28.90%	2,443
LaMoure	2,511	61.39%	1,575	38.51%	4	0.10%	936	22.88%	4,090
Logan	1,601	64.07%	898	35.93%	0	0.00%	703	28.14%	2,499
McHenry	2,715	54.87%	2,231	45.09%	2	0.04%	484	9.78%	4,948
McIntosh	2,694	81.10%	628	18.90%	0	0.00%	2,066	62.20%	3,322
McKenzie	1,715	53.08%	1,514	46.86%	2	0.06%	201	6.22%	3,231
McLean	3,398	55.05%	2,771	44.89%	4	0.06%	627	10.16%	6,173
Mercer	2,395	73.94%	844	26.06%	0	0.00%	1,551	47.88%	3,239
Morton	4,028	45.28%	4,866	54.70%	1	0.01%	-838	-9.42%	8,895
Mountrail	1,894	45.50%	2,264	54.38%	5	0.12%	-370	-8.88%	4,163
Nelson	1,934	52.00%	1,783	47.94%	2	0.05%	151	4.06%	3,719
Oliver	703	58.68%	494	41.24%	1	0.08%	209	17.44%	1,198
Pembina	3,348	57.62%	2,460	42.34%	2	0.03%	888	15.28%	5,810
Pierce	1,464	44.19%	1,848	55.78%	1	0.03%	-384	-11.59%	3,313
Ramsey	3,599	56.12%	2,813	43.86%	1	0.02%	786	12.26%	6,413
Ransom	2,324	56.26%	1,806	43.72%	1	0.02%	518	12.54%	4,131
Renville	1,012	45.38%	1,217	54.57%	1	0.04%	-205	-9.19%	2,230
Richland	4,711	54.04%	4,003	45.92%	4	0.05%	708	8.12%	8,718
Rolette	1,277	35.33%	2,335	64.59%	3	0.08%	-1,058	-29.26%	3,615
Sargent	1,591	48.98%	1,655	50.95%	2	0.06%	-64	-1.97%	3,248
Sheridan	1,552	73.98%	539	25.69%	7	0.33%	1,013	48.29%	2,098
Sioux	571	45.35%	688	54.65%	0	0.00%	-117	-9.30%	1,259
Slope	475	52.43%	431	47.57%	0	0.00%	44	4.86%	906
Stark	3,223	43.43%	4,197	56.56%	1	0.01%	-974	-13.13%	7,421
Steele	1,209	50.76%	1,173	49.24%	0	0.00%	36	1.52%	2,382
Stutsman	5,905	56.78%	4,481	43.09%	13	0.13%	1,424	13.69%	10,399
Towner	1,410	52.16%	1,292	47.80%	1	0.04%	118	4.36%	2,703
Traill	3,218	60.68%	2,084	39.30%	1	0.02%	1,134	21.38%	5,303
Walsh	4,036	50.16%	4,009	49.82%	2	0.02%	27	0.34%	8,047
Ward	9,680	54.83%	7,954	45.06%	19	0.11%	1,726	9.77%	17,653
Wells	2,641	58.24%	1,885	41.57%	9	0.20%	756	16.67%	4,535
Williams	4,492	48.95%	4,683	51.03%	2	0.02%	-191	-2.08%	9,177
Totals	154,310	55.42%	123,963	44.52%	158	0.06%	30,347	10.90%	278,431

==== Counties that flipped from Republican to Democratic ====
- Billings
- Emmons
- Griggs
- Morton
- Pierce
- Renville
- Sargent
- Stark
- Sioux
- Williams

== See also ==
- United States presidential elections in North Dakota
