= Sheridan County, North Dakota =

County in North Dakota, United States

- County
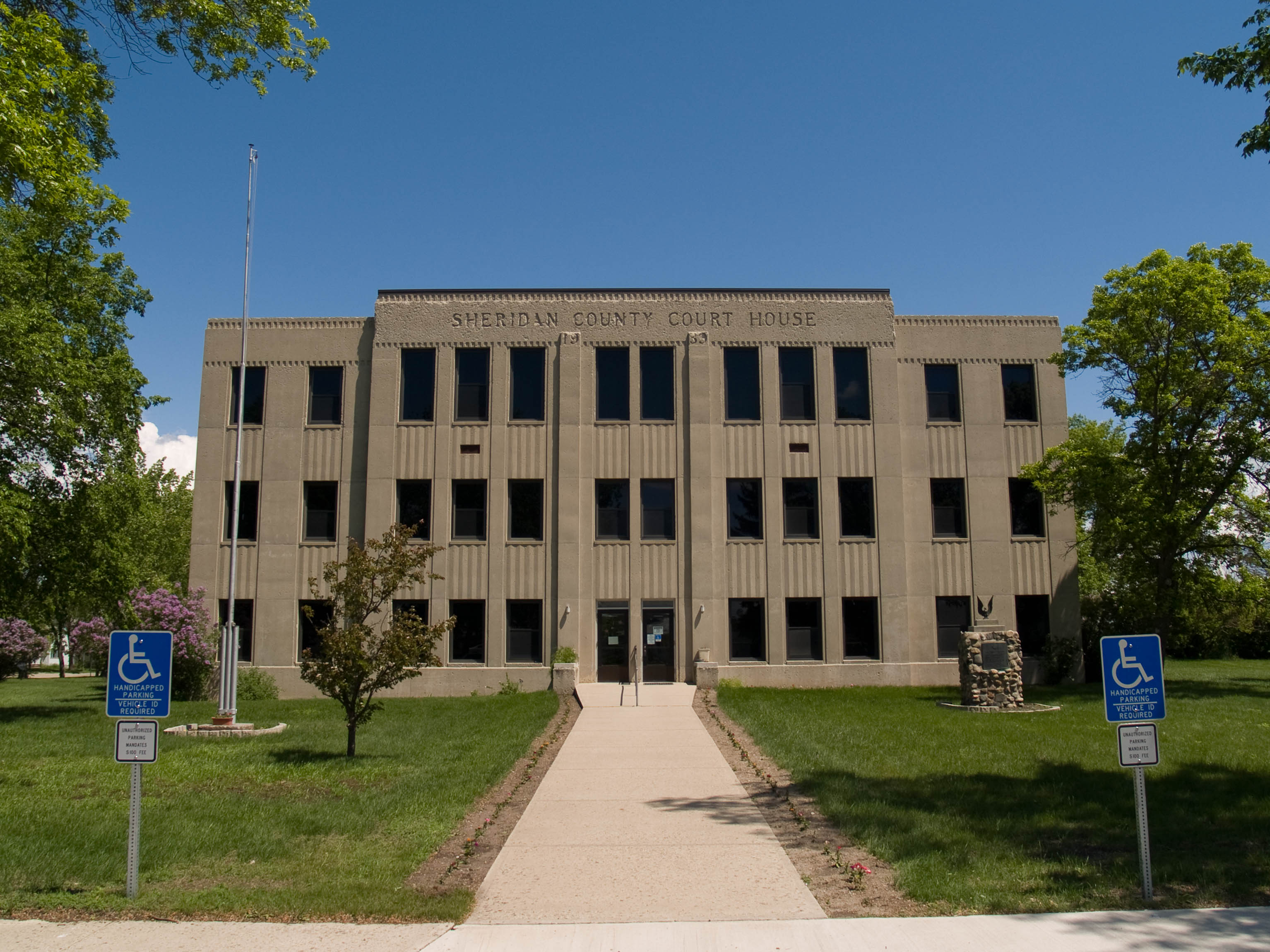
- The Sheridan County Courthouse in McClusky

- Location within the U.S. state of North Dakota
- Coordinates: 47.581359°N 100.330986°W
- Country: United States
- State: North Dakota
- Founded: January 4, 1873 (created); December 24, 1908 (organized)
- Named for: Philip Henry Sheridan
- Seat: McClusky
- Largest city: McClusky

Area
  - Total: 1,005.508 sq mi (2,604.25 km^{2})
  - Land: 972.226 sq mi (2,518.05 km^{2})
  - Water: 33.282 sq mi (86.20 km^{2}) 3.31%

Population (2020)
  - Total: 1,265
  - Estimate (2025): 1,296 ▲
  - Density: 1.304/sq mi (0.503/km^{2})
- Time zone: UTC−6 (Central)
  - Summer (DST): UTC−5 (CDT)
- Area code: 701
- Congressional district: At-large
- Website: co.sheridan.nd.us

Sheridan County is a county located in the U.S. state of North Dakota. As of the 2020 census, the population was 1,265, and was estimated to be 1,296 in 2025. making it the third-least populous county in North Dakota. The county seat and the largest city is McClusky.

== History ==
The Dakota Territory legislature created the county on January 4, 1873, naming it for Civil War General Philip Henry Sheridan. The county organization was not completed at that time, but the new county was not attached to another county for administrative or judicial purposes. In 1883 and again in 1887, the county boundaries were reduced, and on November 8, 1892, the county was dissolved, its remaining territory assigned to McLean. This lasted until the November 3, 1908 election, when McLean County voters chose to partition off the eastern portion of that unit into a new county, although the new boundaries were somewhat different from the former Sheridan. The new county government was effected on December 24 of that year.

Sheridan has been severely affected by out-migration; its population collapsed from 7,373 in 1930 to 1,321 by 2010. Its population decline of 38.4% from 1990 to 2016 was the highest among all North Dakota counties.

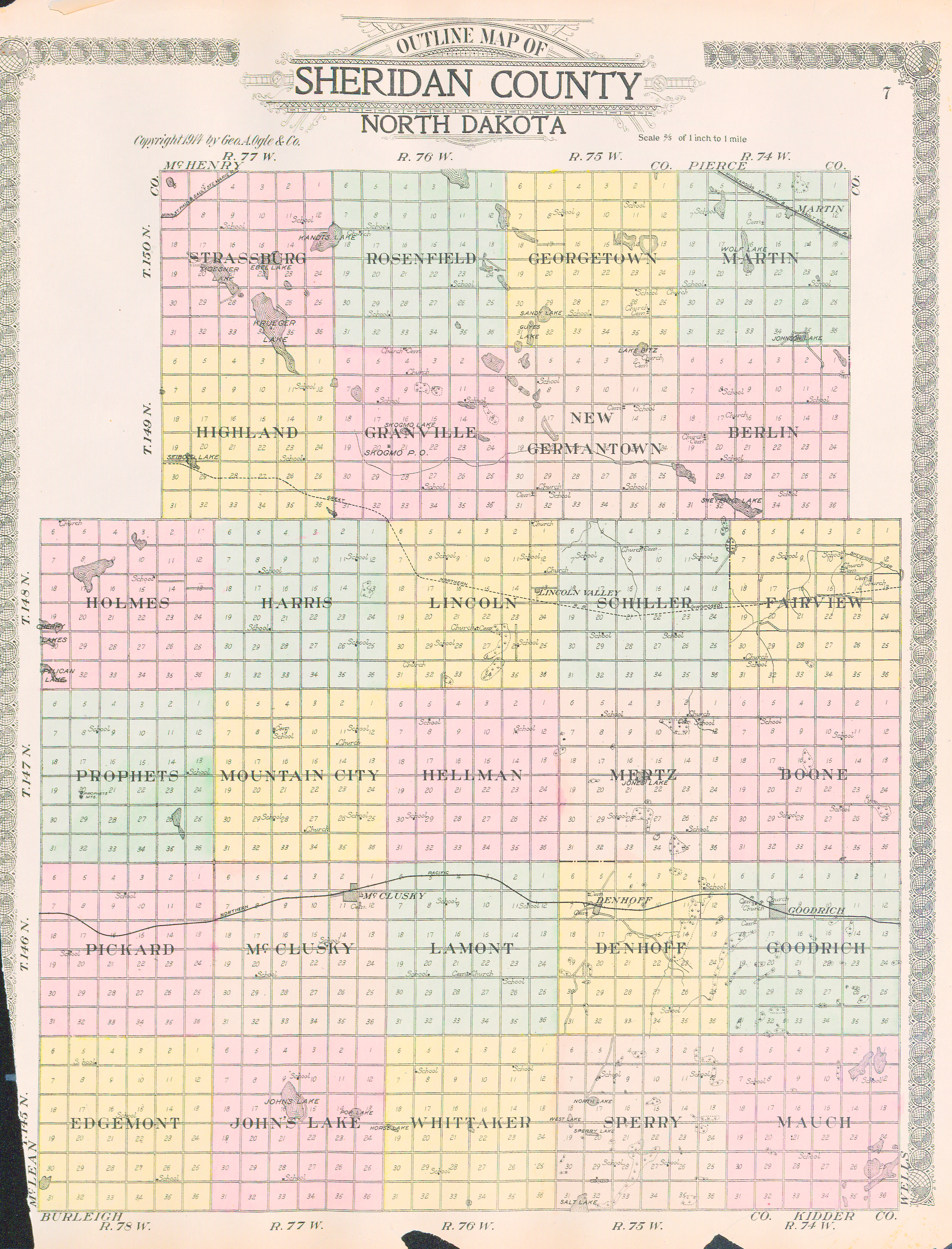
Outline map of Sheridan County, North Dakota, 1914

== Geography ==
The terrain of Sheridan County consists of dry rolling hills, dotted with lakes and ponds. The area is largely devoted to agriculture. The terrain slopes to the north and east, with its highest point on the eastern part of its southern boundary at 2,034 ft (620 m) ASL.

According to the United States Census Bureau, the county has a total area of 1,005.508 square miles (2,604.25 km^{2}), of which 972.226 square miles (2,518.05 km^{2}) is land and 33.282 square miles (86.20 km^{2}) (3.31%) is water. It is the 43rd largest county in North Dakota by total area.

=== Major highways ===
- U.S. Highway 52
- North Dakota Highway 14
- North Dakota Highway 53
- North Dakota Highway 200

=== Adjacent counties ===
- McHenry County - north
- Pierce County - northeast
- Wells County - east
- Kidder County - southeast
- Burleigh County - south
- McLean County - west

=== National protected area ===
- Sheyenne Lake National Wildlife Refuge

=== Lakes ===
- Bentz Lake
- Cherry Lake
- Coal Mine Lake
- Ebel Lake
- Guyes Lake
- Heckers Lake
- Kandt Lake
- Krueger Lake
- Lake Richard (part)
- Lone Tree Lake
- Moesner Lake
- Pelican Lake (part)
- Postel Lake
- Salt Lake (part)
- Sand Lake
- Sheyenne Lake

== Demographics ==
Historical population
| Census | Pop. | Note | %± |
|---|---|---|---|
| 1910 | 8,103 | | — |
| 1920 | 7,935 | | −2.1% |
| 1930 | 7,373 | | −7.1% |
| 1940 | 6,616 | | −10.3% |
| 1950 | 5,253 | | −20.6% |
| 1960 | 4,350 | | −17.2% |
| 1970 | 3,232 | | −25.7% |
| 1980 | 2,819 | | −12.8% |
| 1990 | 2,148 | | −23.8% |
| 2000 | 1,710 | | −20.4% |
| 2010 | 1,321 | | −22.7% |
| 2020 | 1,265 | | −4.2% |
| 2025 (est.) | 1,296 | ▲ | 2.5% |
U.S. Decennial Census; 1790–1960 1900–1990; 1990–2000 2010–2020

As of the fourth quarter of 2024, the median home value in Sheridan County was $114,114.

As of the 2023 American Community Survey, there are 676 estimated households in Sheridan County with an average of 1.96 persons per household. The county has a median household income of $67,361. Approximately 16.5% of the county's population lives at or below the poverty line. Sheridan County has an estimated 56.7% employment rate, with 20.3% of the population holding a bachelor's degree or higher and 90.8% holding a high school diploma.

The top five reported ancestries (people were allowed to report up to two ancestries, thus the figures will generally add to more than 100%) were English (97.7%), Spanish (0.0%), Indo-European (1.9%), Asian and Pacific Islander (0.0%), and Other (0.4%).

The median age in the county was 50.8 years.

Sheridan County, North Dakota – racial and ethnic composition
Note: the US Census treats Hispanic/Latino as an ethnic category. This table excludes Latinos from the racial categories and assigns them to a separate category. Hispanics/Latinos may be of any race.

| Race / ethnicity (NH = non-Hispanic) | Pop. 1980 | Pop. 1990 | Pop. 2000 | Pop. 2010 | Pop. 2020 |
|---|---|---|---|---|---|
| White alone (NH) | 2,811 (99.72%) | 2,137 (99.49%) | 1,692 (98.95%) | 1,272 (96.29%) | 1,191 (94.15%) |
| Black or African American alone (NH) | 0 (0.00%) | 0 (0.00%) | 2 (0.12%) | 0 (0.00%) | 2 (0.16%) |
| Native American or Alaska Native alone (NH) | 5 (0.18%) | 9 (0.42%) | 7 (0.41%) | 14 (1.06%) | 11 (0.87%) |
| Asian alone (NH) | 1 (0.04%) | 1 (0.05%) | 0 (0.00%) | 2 (0.15%) | 6 (0.47%) |
| Pacific Islander alone (NH) | — | — | 0 (0.00%) | 2 (0.15%) | 0 (0.00%) |
| Other race alone (NH) | 1 (0.04%) | 0 (0.00%) | 0 (0.00%) | 0 (0.00%) | 4 (0.32%) |
| Mixed race or multiracial (NH) | — | — | 3 (0.18%) | 15 (1.14%) | 41 (3.24%) |
| Hispanic or Latino (any race) | 1 (0.04%) | 1 (0.05%) | 6 (0.35%) | 16 (1.21%) | 10 (0.79%) |
| Total | 2,819 (100.00%) | 2,148 (100.00%) | 1,710 (100.00%) | 1,321 (100.00%) | 1,265 (100.00%) |

=== 2024 estimate ===
As of the 2024 estimate, there were 1,268 people and 676 households residing in the county. There were 821 housing units at an average density of 0.84 per square mile (0.3/km^{2}). The racial makeup of the county was 93.9% White (93.1% NH White), 0.3% African American, 2.1% Native American, 0.6% Asian, 0.1% Pacific Islander, _% from some other races and 2.9% from two or more races. Hispanic or Latino people of any race were 1.3% of the population.

=== 2020 census ===
As of the 2020 census, there were 1,265 people, 585 households, and 369 families residing in the county. The population density was 1.30 inhabitants per square mile (0.5/km^{2}). There were 808 housing units at an average density of 0.83 per square mile (0.3/km^{2}).

Of the residents, 19.7% were under the age of 18 and 28.2% were 65 years of age or older; the median age was 51.8 years. For every 100 females there were 111.5 males, and for every 100 females age 18 and over there were 114.3 males.

The racial makeup of the county was 94.2% White, 0.2% Black or African American, 0.9% American Indian and Alaska Native, 0.6% Asian, 0.4% from some other race, and 3.8% from two or more races. Hispanic or Latino residents of any race comprised 0.8% of the population.

There were 585 households in the county, of which 19.7% had children under the age of 18 living with them and 19.3% had a female householder with no spouse or partner present. About 34.2% of all households were made up of individuals and 17.4% had someone living alone who was 65 years of age or older.

There were 808 housing units, of which 27.6% were vacant. Among occupied housing units, 84.8% were owner-occupied and 15.2% were renter-occupied. The homeowner vacancy rate was 4.0% and the rental vacancy rate was 11.2%.

=== 2010 census ===
As of the 2010 census, there were 1,321 people, 645 households, and 417 families residing in the county. The population density was 1.36 inhabitants per square mile (0.5/km^{2}). There were 894 housing units at an average density of 0.92 per square mile (0.4/km^{2}). The racial makeup of the county was 96.74% White, 0.30% African American, 1.06% Native American, 0.15% Asian, 0.15% Pacific Islander, 0.38% from some other races and 1.21% from two or more races. Hispanic or Latino people of any race were 1.21% of the population.

In terms of ancestry, 70.1% were German, 14.2% were Norwegian, 6.3% were English, 6.0% were Russian, and 1.8% were American.

There were 645 households, 17.5% had children under the age of 18 living with them, 54.3% were married couples living together, 5.7% had a female householder with no husband present, 35.3% were non-families, and 33.0% of all households were made up of individuals. The average household size was 2.05 and the average family size was 2.55. The median age was 53.4 years.

The median income for a household in the county was $37,727 and the median income for a family was $43,906. Males had a median income of $30,833 versus $24,583 for females. The per capita income for the county was $24,286. About 15.0% of families and 18.9% of the population were below the poverty line, including 31.1% of those under age 18 and 19.7% of those age 65 or over.

== Communities ==
=== Cities ===
- Goodrich
- Martin
- McClusky (county seat)

=== Census-designated place ===
- Denhoff

=== Unincorporated communities ===
- Lincoln Valley
- Pickardville

=== Townships ===
- Berlin
- Boone
- Denhoff
- Edgemont
- Fairview
- Goodrich
- Highland
- Lincoln Dale
- Martin
- Mauch
- McClusky
- Pickard
- Prophets
- Rosenfield

=== Defunct townships ===
- Holmes
- New Germantown

== Politics ==
United States presidential election results for Sheridan County, North Dakota
| Year | Republican | | Democratic | | Third party(ies) | |
| Year | No. | % | No. | % | No. | % |
|---|---|---|---|---|---|---|
| 1912 | 306 | 32.01% | 170 | 17.78% | 480 | 50.21% |
| 1916 | 807 | 70.05% | 310 | 26.91% | 35 | 3.04% |
| 1920 | 1,776 | 92.12% | 134 | 6.95% | 18 | 0.93% |
| 1924 | 594 | 34.66% | 49 | 2.86% | 1,071 | 62.49% |
| 1928 | 1,242 | 56.61% | 944 | 43.03% | 8 | 0.36% |
| 1932 | 468 | 19.08% | 1,945 | 79.29% | 40 | 1.63% |
| 1936 | 834 | 29.81% | 1,150 | 41.10% | 814 | 29.09% |
| 1940 | 2,405 | 81.33% | 543 | 18.36% | 9 | 0.30% |
| 1944 | 1,910 | 82.76% | 386 | 16.72% | 12 | 0.52% |
| 1948 | 1,554 | 78.92% | 372 | 18.89% | 43 | 2.18% |
| 1952 | 2,016 | 87.31% | 267 | 11.56% | 26 | 1.13% |
| 1956 | 1,646 | 77.71% | 472 | 22.29% | 0 | 0.00% |
| 1960 | 1,552 | 73.98% | 539 | 25.69% | 7 | 0.33% |
| 1964 | 1,187 | 62.11% | 724 | 37.89% | 0 | 0.00% |
| 1968 | 1,295 | 74.99% | 350 | 20.27% | 82 | 4.75% |
| 1972 | 1,460 | 80.71% | 334 | 18.46% | 15 | 0.83% |
| 1976 | 935 | 60.87% | 569 | 37.04% | 32 | 2.08% |
| 1980 | 1,326 | 82.51% | 208 | 12.94% | 73 | 4.54% |
| 1984 | 1,075 | 77.01% | 306 | 21.92% | 15 | 1.07% |
| 1988 | 885 | 67.15% | 428 | 32.47% | 5 | 0.38% |
| 1992 | 589 | 50.13% | 276 | 23.49% | 310 | 26.38% |
| 1996 | 566 | 60.15% | 252 | 26.78% | 123 | 13.07% |
| 2000 | 707 | 76.19% | 161 | 17.35% | 60 | 6.47% |
| 2004 | 727 | 77.01% | 200 | 21.19% | 17 | 1.80% |
| 2008 | 555 | 69.12% | 229 | 28.52% | 19 | 2.37% |
| 2012 | 642 | 78.10% | 163 | 19.83% | 17 | 2.07% |
| 2016 | 650 | 82.59% | 95 | 12.07% | 42 | 5.34% |
| 2020 | 688 | 84.73% | 104 | 12.81% | 20 | 2.46% |
| 2024 | 644 | 85.07% | 101 | 13.34% | 12 | 1.59% |

== Education ==
School districts include:

- Drake Public School District 57
- Anamoose Public School District 14
- Goodrich Public School District 16
- Harvey Public School District 38
- McClusky Public School District 19
- Turtle Lake-Mercer Public School District 72

== See also ==
- National Register of Historic Places listings in Sheridan County, North Dakota
