= Eddy County, North Dakota =

County in North Dakota, United States

- County
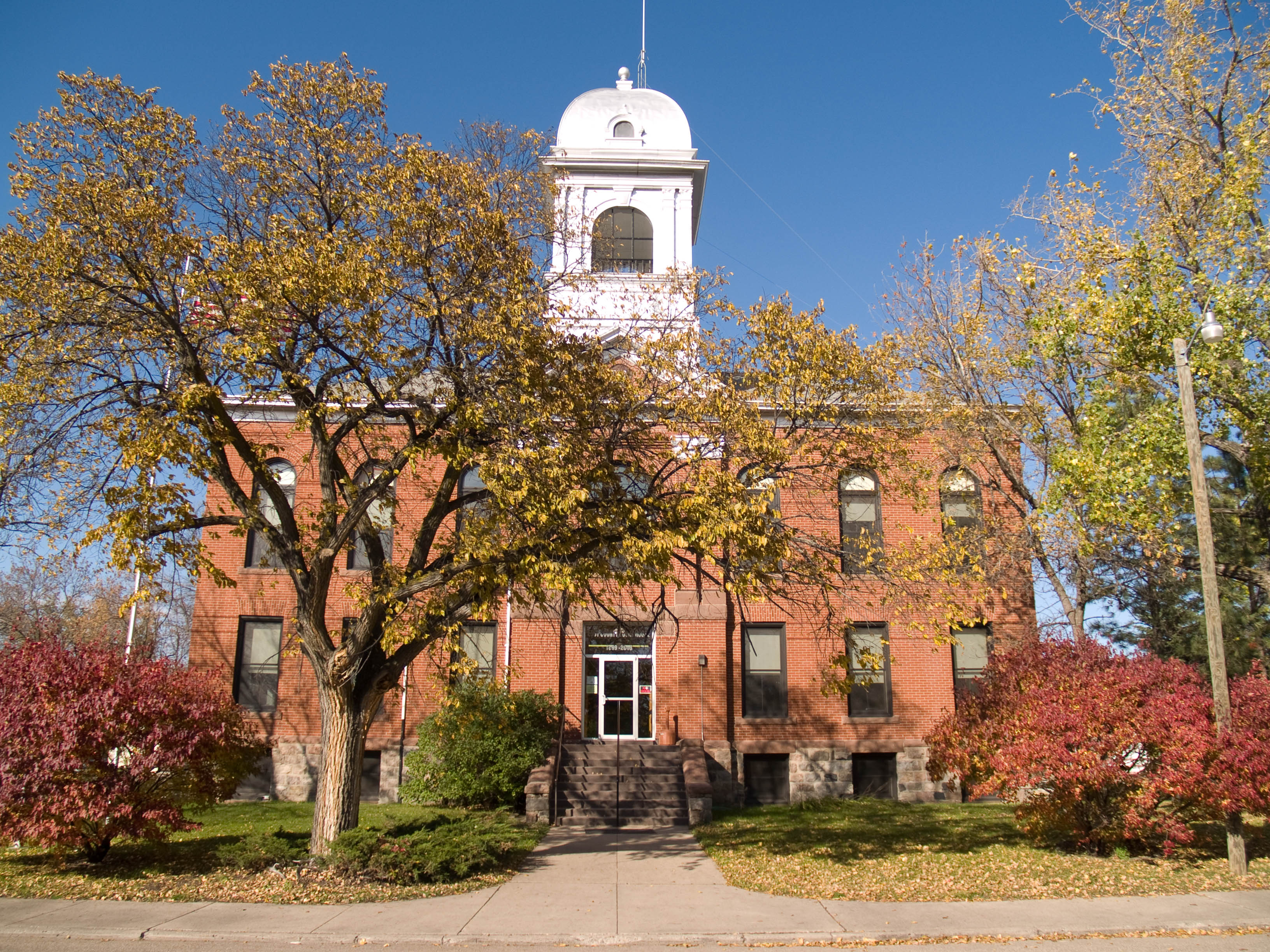
- The Eddy County Courthouse in New Rockford

- Location within the U.S. state of North Dakota
- Coordinates: 47.723436°N 98.900474°W
- Country: United States
- State: North Dakota
- Founded: March 31, 1885 (created); April 27, 1885 (organized)
- Seat: New Rockford
- Largest city: New Rockford

Area
  - Total: 644.144 sq mi (1,668.33 km^{2})
  - Land: 630.239 sq mi (1,632.31 km^{2})
  - Water: 13.905 sq mi (36.01 km^{2}) 2.16%

Population (2020)
  - Total: 2,347
  - Estimate (2025): 2,329 ▼
  - Density: 3.664/sq mi (1.415/km^{2})
- Time zone: UTC−6 (Central)
  - Summer (DST): UTC−5 (CDT)
- Area code: 701
- Congressional district: At-large
- Website: eddycountynd.org

Eddy County is a county in the U.S. state of North Dakota. As of the 2020 census, the population was 2,347, and was estimated to be 2,329 in 2025. The county seat and the largest city is New Rockford. Eddy County is the smallest county in North Dakota by land area.

== History ==
The Dakota Territory legislature created the county on March 31, 1885, with territory partitioned from Foster County. It was named for Ezra B. Eddy, a Fargo, North Dakota banker who had died a few weeks earlier. The county government was established on April 27, 1885.

== Geography ==
The Sheyenne River flows easterly through the upper part of the county. The county terrain consists of semi-arid hills, featuring some agriculture. The terrain slopes to the east and slightly to the north, with its highest point on a hill at the county's southwestern corner, at 1,562 ft (476 m) ASL.

According to the United States Census Bureau, the county has a total area of 644.144 square miles (1,668.33 km^{2}), of which 630.239 square miles (1,632.31 km^{2}) is land and 13.905 square miles (36.01 km^{2}) (2.16%) is water. It is the 53rd largest county and the 1st smallest county in North Dakota by total area.

=== Adjacent counties ===
- Benson County – north
- Nelson County – northeast
- Griggs County – southeast
- Foster County – south
- Wells County – west

=== Major highways ===
- U.S. Highway 281
- North Dakota Highway 15
- North Dakota Highway 20

=== County roads ===
- Eddy County Road 1
- Eddy County Road 2
- Eddy County Road 3
- Eddy County Road 4
- Eddy County Road 5
- Eddy County Road 6
- Eddy County Road 7
- Eddy County Road 8
- Eddy County Road 9
- Eddy County Road 10
- Eddy County Road 12
- Eddy County Road 14
- Eddy County Road 16

Eddy County Road 14 is a north-south County Road in North Dakota. It runs from North Dakota Highway 15 near New Rockford to Eddy County Road 9 (1st Ave North) in downtown New Rockford. Eddy County Road 9 is an east-west County Road in North Dakota. It runs from US 281/Highway 15 (1st Street) in New Rockford to Wells County CR 2, near New Rockford.

=== National protected area ===
- Johnson Lake National Wildlife Refuge (part)

== Demographics ==
Historical population
| Census | Pop. | Note | %± |
|---|---|---|---|
| 1890 | 1,377 | | — |
| 1900 | 3,330 | | 141.8% |
| 1910 | 4,800 | | 44.1% |
| 1920 | 6,493 | | 35.3% |
| 1930 | 6,346 | | −2.3% |
| 1940 | 5,741 | | −9.5% |
| 1950 | 5,372 | | −6.4% |
| 1960 | 4,936 | | −8.1% |
| 1970 | 4,103 | | −16.9% |
| 1980 | 3,554 | | −13.4% |
| 1990 | 2,951 | | −17.0% |
| 2000 | 2,757 | | −6.6% |
| 2010 | 2,385 | | −13.5% |
| 2020 | 2,347 | | −1.6% |
| 2025 (est.) | 2,329 | ▼ | −0.8% |
U.S. Decennial Census; 1790–1960 1900–1990; 1990–2000 2010–2020

As of the fourth quarter of 2024, the median home value in Eddy County was $122,379.

As of the 2023 American Community Survey, there are 1,142 estimated households in Eddy County with an average of 1.95 persons per household. The county has a median household income of $55,389. Approximately 11.5% of the county's population lives at or below the poverty line. Eddy County has an estimated 61.0% employment rate, with 28.2% of the population holding a bachelor's degree or higher and 92.7% holding a high school diploma.

The top five reported ancestries (people were allowed to report up to two ancestries, thus the figures will generally add to more than 100%) were English (98.1%), Spanish (0.4%), Indo-European (0.9%), Asian and Pacific Islander (0.0%), and Other (0.5%).

The median age in the county was 48.7 years.

Eddy County, North Dakota – racial and ethnic composition
Note: the US Census treats Hispanic/Latino as an ethnic category. This table excludes Latinos from the racial categories and assigns them to a separate category. Hispanics/Latinos may be of any race.

| Race / ethnicity (NH = non-Hispanic) | Pop. 1980 | Pop. 1990 | Pop. 2000 | Pop. 2010 | Pop. 2020 |
|---|---|---|---|---|---|
| White alone (NH) | 3,523 (99.13%) | 2,897 (98.17%) | 2,649 (96.08%) | 2,242 (94.00%) | 2,102 (89.56%) |
| Black or African American alone (NH) | 1 (0.03%) | 0 (0.00%) | 2 (0.07%) | 4 (0.17%) | 5 (0.21%) |
| Native American or Alaska Native alone (NH) | 26 (0.73%) | 49 (1.66%) | 63 (2.29%) | 57 (2.39%) | 60 (2.56%) |
| Asian alone (NH) | 1 (0.03%) | 1 (0.03%) | 4 (0.15%) | 6 (0.25%) | 0 (0.00%) |
| Pacific Islander alone (NH) | — | — | 2 (0.07%) | 2 (0.08%) | 0 (0.00%) |
| Other race alone (NH) | 0 (0.00%) | 0 (0.00%) | 0 (0.00%) | 0 (0.00%) | 0 (0.00%) |
| Mixed race or multiracial (NH) | — | — | 20 (0.73%) | 22 (0.92%) | 103 (4.39%) |
| Hispanic or Latino (any race) | 3 (0.08%) | 4 (0.14%) | 17 (0.62%) | 52 (2.18%) | 77 (3.28%) |
| Total | 3,554 (100.00%) | 2,951 (100.00%) | 2,757 (100.00%) | 2,385 (100.00%) | 2,347 (100.00%) |

=== 2024 estimate ===
As of the 2024 estimate, there were 2,309 people and 1,142 households residing in the county. There were 1,234 housing units at an average density of 1.96 per square mile (0.8/km^{2}). The racial makeup of the county was 91.6% White (88.4% NH White), 0.4% African American, 6.0% Native American, 0.4% Asian, 0.0% Pacific Islander, _% from some other races and 1.6% from two or more races. Hispanic or Latino people of any race were 3.9% of the population.

=== 2020 census ===
As of the 2020 census, the county had a population of 2,347, 1,026 households, and 637 families residing in the county. The population density was 3.7 inhabitants per square mile (1.4/km^{2}). There were 1,240 housing units at an average density of 1.97 per square mile (0.8/km^{2}); 17.3% were vacant. Of the residents, 22.3% were under the age of 18 and 25.1% were 65 years of age or older; the median age was 45.0 years. For every 100 females there were 109.6 males, and for every 100 females age 18 and over there were 107.0 males. The racial makeup of the county was 89.9% White, 0.2% Black or African American, 2.8% American Indian and Alaska Native, 0.1% Asian, 1.4% from some other race, and 5.7% from two or more races. Hispanic or Latino residents of any race comprised 3.3% of the population. Of the 1,026 households, 26.2% had children under the age of 18 living with them and 20.8% had a female householder with no spouse or partner present. About 32.3% of all households were made up of individuals and 17.1% had someone living alone who was 65 years of age or older. Among occupied housing units, 74.2% were owner-occupied and 25.8% were renter-occupied. The homeowner vacancy rate was 2.8% and the rental vacancy rate was 8.7%.

=== 2010 census ===
As of the 2010 census, there were 2,385 people, 1,057 households, and 653 families residing in the county. The population density was 3.8 inhabitants per square mile (1.5/km^{2}). There were 1,323 housing units at an average density of 2.10 per square mile (0.8/km^{2}). The racial makeup of the county was 95.18% White, 0.17% African American, 2.43% Native American, 0.25% Asian, 0.08% Pacific Islander, 0.84% from some other races and 1.05% from two or more races. Hispanic or Latino people of any race were 2.18% of the population.

In terms of ancestry, 52.7% were German, 45.9% were Norwegian, 9.3% were Irish, 6.5% were Swedish, and 1.3% were American.

There were 1,057 households, 24.2% had children under the age of 18 living with them, 50.9% were married couples living together, 7.4% had a female householder with no husband present, 38.2% were non-families, and 33.9% of all households were made up of individuals. The average household size was 2.18 and the average family size was 2.77. The median age was 49.2 years.

The median income for a household in the county was $38,404 and the median income for a family was $47,857. Males had a median income of $31,887 versus $28,194 for females. The per capita income for the county was $20,302. About 11.5% of families and 15.4% of the population were below the poverty line, including 21.0% of those under age 18 and 21.7% of those age 65 or over.

== Communities ==
=== Cities ===
- New Rockford (county seat)
- Sheyenne

=== Unincorporated communities ===
- Brantford
- Hamar

=== Townships ===
- Bush
- Cherry Lake
- Columbia
- Colvin
- Eddy
- Freeborn
- Gates
- Grandfield
- Hillsdale
- Lake Washington
- Munster
- New Rockford
- Paradise
- Pleasant Prairie
- Rosefield
- Sheldon
- Superior
- Tiffany

== Politics ==
Eddy County voters tend to vote Republican. In 71% percent of the national elections since 1960, the county selected the Republican Party candidate.

United States presidential election results for Eddy County, North Dakota
| Year | Republican | | Democratic | | Third party(ies) | |
| Year | No. | % | No. | % | No. | % |
|---|---|---|---|---|---|---|
| 1900 | 455 | 64.45% | 235 | 33.29% | 16 | 2.27% |
| 1904 | 596 | 76.21% | 162 | 20.72% | 24 | 3.07% |
| 1908 | 540 | 58.00% | 368 | 39.53% | 23 | 2.47% |
| 1912 | 199 | 21.87% | 376 | 41.32% | 335 | 36.81% |
| 1916 | 505 | 40.21% | 650 | 51.75% | 101 | 8.04% |
| 1920 | 1,525 | 68.76% | 577 | 26.01% | 116 | 5.23% |
| 1924 | 881 | 39.33% | 101 | 4.51% | 1,258 | 56.16% |
| 1928 | 1,071 | 46.12% | 1,240 | 53.40% | 11 | 0.47% |
| 1932 | 537 | 21.25% | 1,888 | 74.71% | 102 | 4.04% |
| 1936 | 579 | 21.36% | 1,729 | 63.78% | 403 | 14.87% |
| 1940 | 1,319 | 48.42% | 1,368 | 50.22% | 37 | 1.36% |
| 1944 | 974 | 47.56% | 1,042 | 50.88% | 32 | 1.56% |
| 1948 | 952 | 46.85% | 919 | 45.23% | 161 | 7.92% |
| 1952 | 1,534 | 67.05% | 728 | 31.82% | 26 | 1.14% |
| 1956 | 1,239 | 56.01% | 973 | 43.99% | 0 | 0.00% |
| 1960 | 1,188 | 50.73% | 1,152 | 49.19% | 2 | 0.09% |
| 1964 | 747 | 35.78% | 1,337 | 64.03% | 4 | 0.19% |
| 1968 | 1,018 | 51.10% | 893 | 44.83% | 81 | 4.07% |
| 1972 | 1,022 | 52.04% | 911 | 46.38% | 31 | 1.58% |
| 1976 | 890 | 43.33% | 1,123 | 54.67% | 41 | 2.00% |
| 1980 | 1,153 | 61.23% | 539 | 28.62% | 191 | 10.14% |
| 1984 | 1,049 | 56.40% | 796 | 42.80% | 15 | 0.81% |
| 1988 | 891 | 53.74% | 748 | 45.11% | 19 | 1.15% |
| 1992 | 591 | 36.59% | 575 | 35.60% | 449 | 27.80% |
| 1996 | 517 | 40.36% | 553 | 43.17% | 211 | 16.47% |
| 2000 | 703 | 55.44% | 458 | 36.12% | 107 | 8.44% |
| 2004 | 655 | 54.00% | 534 | 44.02% | 24 | 1.98% |
| 2008 | 548 | 47.04% | 583 | 50.04% | 34 | 2.92% |
| 2012 | 634 | 54.80% | 486 | 42.01% | 37 | 3.20% |
| 2016 | 791 | 64.26% | 355 | 28.84% | 85 | 6.90% |
| 2020 | 854 | 67.72% | 383 | 30.37% | 24 | 1.90% |
| 2024 | 862 | 71.54% | 316 | 26.22% | 27 | 2.24% |

== Education ==
School districts include:

- Carrington Public School District 10
- Dakota Prairie Public School District 1
- Midkota Public School District 7
- New Rockford-Sheyenne Public School District 2
- Warwick Public School District 29

== See also ==
- National Register of Historic Places listings in Eddy County, North Dakota
