= 1924 United States presidential election in North Dakota =

- November 4, 1924

| Nominee | Calvin Coolidge | Robert M. La Follette | John W. Davis |
| Party | Republican | Nonpartisan League | Democratic |
| Alliance | | Progressive |
| Home state | Massachusetts | Wisconsin | West Virginia |
| Running mate | Charles G. Dawes | Burton K. Wheeler | Charles W. Bryan |
| Electoral vote | 5 | 0 | 0 |
| Popular vote | 94,931 | 89,922 | 13,858 |
| Percentage | 47.68% | 45.17% | 6.96% |
County results
Coolidge
40–50%
50–60%
60–70%
La Follette
40–50%
50–60%
60–70%
70–80%
President before election
Calvin Coolidge
Republican
Elected President
Calvin Coolidge
Republican

The 1924 United States presidential election in North Dakota took place on November 4, 1924, as part of the 1924 United States presidential election which was held throughout all contemporary 48 states. Voters chose five representatives, or electors to the Electoral College, who voted for president and vice president.

Ever since statehood, North Dakota had been overwhelmingly Republican at state level and in many presidential elections, although progressive Democrat Woodrow Wilson was able to carry the state in both his campaigns in 1912 and 1916, in the second due to his anti-war platform. The Russian-Germans who dominated North Dakota's populace were vehemently opposed to President Wilson's pushing of the nation into World War I and his “League of Nations” proposal. To this populace descended from Germans who had settled in Russia, Wilson's entry into the war and his support for the Treaty of Versailles was a betrayal, whilst farmers were also faced with a postwar agricultural depression as prices fell with reduced demand in Europe. Consequently, North Dakota went for the isolationist Warren G. Harding over the pro-League Democrat Cox by four-to-one in 1920.

Despite Harding's massive victory, discontent amongst North Dakota's large farm population persisted during his term, but the national Democratic Party did nothing to provide any hope of regaining Wilson's prominence in North Dakota, being instead dominated by conflicts between its Southern and Western faction led by William Gibbs McAdoo and its urban Northeastern faction led by Al Smith. A fierce debate ensued that saw a compromise candidate, former Congressman John W. Davis of West Virginia, nominated after one hundred and three ballots in hot summer weather at Madison Square Garden. Although West Virginia was a border state whose limited African-American population had not been disenfranchised as happened in all former Confederate States, Davis did share many views of Southern Democrats of his era. He supported poll taxes, opposed women's suffrage, and believed in strictly limited government with no expansion in nonmilitary fields. In North Dakota, Davis had almost no appeal, especially as he unlike incumbent Calvin Coolidge supported the League of Nations and was opposed to the state's isolationist views. Although in September he underwent an extensive tour of the Great Plains, and campaigned to eliminate the income tax burden of the poorer classes,

The agrarian Nonpartisan League, as a response to the conservatism of the major parties, nominated Senator Robert M. La Follette of Wisconsin, with Senator Burton K. Wheeler of Montana, as a third-party ticket, supported by the state's Senators Lynn J. Frazier and Gerald P. Nye. Davis and Coolidge both spent most of their campaign attacking La Follette as a political extremist, but nonetheless opinion polls showed that La Follette was attracting large numbers of those German-American and Scandinavian-Americans who completely deserted Cox in 1920. In September some polls had La Follette winning sufficient electoral votes to give no candidate an electoral majority and force the House to make a choice, but as polling day approached newer polls suggested incumbent President Calvin Coolidge would hold the states of Minnesota, North Dakota, South Dakota, Nevada and Montana, which La Follette had been predicted to win in August. Coolidge ultimately won North Dakota by a narrow margin of 2.51 percent, with his win coming from the relatively urbanized Scandinavian-settled counties in the east.

== Results ==
1924 United States presidential election in North Dakota
| Party | Candidate | Running mate | Popular vote | | Electoral vote | |
| Party | Candidate | Running mate | Count | % | Count | % |
|---|---|---|---|---|---|---|
| Republican | Calvin Coolidge of Massachusetts | Charles G. Dawes of Illinois | 94,931 | 47.68% | 5 | 100.00% |
| Nonpartisan League | Robert M. La Follette of Wisconsin | Burton K. Wheeler of Montana | 89,922 | 45.17% | 0 | 0.00% |
| Democratic | John W. Davis of West Virginia | Charles W. Bryan of Nebraska | 13,858 | 6.96% | 0 | 0.00% |
| Communist | William Z. Foster of Massachusetts | Benjamin Gitlow of New York | 370 | 0.19% | 0 | 0.00% |
| Total | | | 199,081 | 100.00% | 5 | 100.00% |

=== Results by county ===
| County | Calvin Coolidge Republican | | John W. Davis Democratic | | Robert M. La Follette Nonpartisan League | | William Z. Foster Workers | | Margin (Note: Because Coolidge and La Follette finished in the first two places in North Dakota as a whole and in all counties in the state, all margins given are Coolidge vote minus La Follette vote and all percentage margins Coolidge percentage minus La Follette percentage.) | | Total votes cast |
| County | # | % | # | % | # | % | # | % | # | % | Total votes cast |
|---|---|---|---|---|---|---|---|---|---|---|---|
| Adams | 776 | 40.25% | 106 | 5.50% | 1,045 | 54.20% | 1 | 0.05% | -269 | -13.95% | 1,928 |
| Barnes | 3,205 | 51.46% | 346 | 5.56% | 2,675 | 42.95% | 2 | 0.03% | 530 | 8.51% | 6,228 |
| Benson | 1,870 | 45.00% | 246 | 5.92% | 2,038 | 49.04% | 2 | 0.05% | -168 | -4.04% | 4,156 |
| Billings | 421 | 48.34% | 32 | 3.67% | 418 | 47.99% | 0 | 0.00% | 3 | 0.34% | 871 |
| Bottineau | 1,338 | 31.99% | 221 | 5.28% | 2,621 | 62.67% | 2 | 0.05% | -1,283 | -30.68% | 4,182 |
| Bowman | 776 | 45.17% | 67 | 3.90% | 875 | 50.93% | 0 | 0.00% | -99 | -5.76% | 1,718 |
| Burke | 996 | 39.62% | 135 | 5.37% | 1,376 | 54.73% | 7 | 0.28% | -380 | -15.12% | 2,514 |
| Burleigh | 3,152 | 53.17% | 379 | 6.39% | 2,338 | 39.44% | 59 | 1.00% | 814 | 13.73% | 5,928 |
| Cass | 9,906 | 65.86% | 1,352 | 8.99% | 3,769 | 25.06% | 14 | 0.09% | 6,137 | 40.80% | 15,041 |
| Cavalier | 2,428 | 54.65% | 539 | 12.13% | 1,471 | 33.11% | 5 | 0.11% | 957 | 21.54% | 4,443 |
| Dickey | 1,716 | 43.66% | 352 | 8.96% | 1,856 | 47.23% | 6 | 0.15% | -140 | -3.56% | 3,930 |
| Divide | 743 | 30.43% | 91 | 3.73% | 1,605 | 65.72% | 3 | 0.12% | -862 | -35.30% | 2,442 |
| Dunn | 980 | 42.78% | 190 | 8.29% | 1,112 | 48.54% | 9 | 0.39% | -132 | -5.76% | 2,291 |
| Eddy | 881 | 39.33% | 101 | 4.51% | 1,258 | 56.16% | 0 | 0.00% | -377 | -16.83% | 2,240 |
| Emmons | 1,198 | 39.66% | 123 | 4.07% | 1,695 | 56.11% | 5 | 0.17% | -497 | -16.45% | 3,021 |
| Foster | 922 | 45.13% | 287 | 14.05% | 833 | 40.77% | 1 | 0.05% | 89 | 4.36% | 2,043 |
| Golden Valley | 718 | 48.29% | 140 | 9.41% | 628 | 42.23% | 1 | 0.07% | 90 | 6.05% | 1,487 |
| Grand Forks | 6,690 | 62.81% | 943 | 8.85% | 3,011 | 28.27% | 7 | 0.07% | 3,679 | 34.54% | 10,651 |
| Grant | 1,120 | 39.07% | 125 | 4.36% | 1,618 | 56.44% | 4 | 0.14% | -498 | -17.37% | 2,867 |
| Griggs | 738 | 33.33% | 116 | 5.24% | 1,360 | 61.43% | 0 | 0.00% | -622 | -28.09% | 2,214 |
| Hettinger | 936 | 39.73% | 128 | 5.43% | 1,291 | 54.80% | 1 | 0.04% | -355 | -15.07% | 2,356 |
| Kidder | 844 | 39.42% | 110 | 5.14% | 1,187 | 55.44% | 0 | 0.00% | -343 | -16.02% | 2,141 |
| LaMoure | 1,647 | 43.23% | 221 | 5.80% | 1,940 | 50.92% | 2 | 0.05% | -293 | -7.69% | 3,810 |
| Logan | 787 | 43.34% | 29 | 1.60% | 994 | 54.74% | 6 | 0.33% | -207 | -11.40% | 1,816 |
| McHenry | 1,692 | 36.89% | 264 | 5.76% | 2,630 | 57.34% | 1 | 0.02% | -938 | -20.45% | 4,587 |
| McIntosh | 637 | 34.45% | 39 | 2.11% | 1,172 | 63.39% | 1 | 0.05% | -535 | -28.93% | 1,849 |
| McKenzie | 1,113 | 38.14% | 137 | 4.69% | 1,661 | 56.92% | 7 | 0.24% | -548 | -18.78% | 2,918 |
| McLean | 1,651 | 36.02% | 194 | 4.23% | 2,718 | 59.31% | 20 | 0.44% | -1,067 | -23.28% | 4,583 |
| Mercer | 522 | 25.02% | 70 | 3.36% | 1,489 | 71.38% | 5 | 0.24% | -967 | -46.36% | 2,086 |
| Morton | 2,377 | 44.26% | 265 | 4.93% | 2,716 | 50.58% | 12 | 0.22% | -339 | -6.31% | 5,370 |
| Mountrail | 1,354 | 36.19% | 130 | 3.48% | 2,209 | 59.05% | 48 | 1.28% | -855 | -22.85% | 3,741 |
| Nelson | 1,697 | 49.20% | 175 | 5.07% | 1,571 | 45.55% | 6 | 0.17% | 126 | 3.65% | 3,449 |
| Oliver | 367 | 32.16% | 31 | 2.72% | 739 | 64.77% | 4 | 0.35% | -372 | -32.60% | 1,141 |
| Pembina | 2,783 | 59.02% | 588 | 12.47% | 1,341 | 28.44% | 3 | 0.06% | 1,442 | 30.58% | 4,715 |
| Pierce | 1,160 | 46.89% | 157 | 6.35% | 1,156 | 46.73% | 1 | 0.04% | 4 | 0.16% | 2,474 |
| Ramsey | 3,110 | 62.35% | 359 | 7.20% | 1,505 | 30.17% | 14 | 0.28% | 1,605 | 32.18% | 4,988 |
| Ransom | 1,862 | 45.59% | 303 | 7.42% | 1,919 | 46.99% | 0 | 0.00% | -57 | -1.40% | 4,084 |
| Renville | 649 | 32.18% | 120 | 5.95% | 1,247 | 61.82% | 1 | 0.05% | -598 | -29.65% | 2,017 |
| Richland | 3,235 | 48.84% | 769 | 11.61% | 2,617 | 39.51% | 3 | 0.05% | 618 | 9.33% | 6,624 |
| Rolette | 869 | 35.92% | 137 | 5.66% | 1,410 | 58.29% | 3 | 0.12% | -541 | -22.36% | 2,419 |
| Sargent | 1,468 | 43.68% | 232 | 6.90% | 1,656 | 49.27% | 5 | 0.15% | -188 | -5.59% | 3,361 |
| Sheridan | 594 | 34.66% | 49 | 2.86% | 1,069 | 62.37% | 2 | 0.12% | -475 | -27.71% | 1,714 |
| Sioux | 777 | 62.21% | 58 | 4.64% | 407 | 32.59% | 7 | 0.56% | 370 | 29.62% | 1,249 |
| Slope | 616 | 39.09% | 47 | 2.98% | 913 | 57.93% | 0 | 0.00% | -297 | -18.85% | 1,576 |
| Stark | 2,130 | 50.58% | 266 | 6.32% | 1,808 | 42.94% | 7 | 0.17% | 322 | 7.65% | 4,211 |
| Steele | 1,247 | 52.77% | 85 | 3.60% | 1,029 | 43.55% | 2 | 0.08% | 218 | 9.23% | 2,363 |
| Stutsman | 3,952 | 56.68% | 463 | 6.64% | 2,552 | 36.60% | 6 | 0.09% | 1,400 | 20.08% | 6,973 |
| Towner | 1,173 | 47.66% | 223 | 9.06% | 1,053 | 42.79% | 12 | 0.49% | 120 | 4.88% | 2,461 |
| Traill | 2,596 | 56.64% | 234 | 5.11% | 1,752 | 38.23% | 1 | 0.02% | 844 | 18.42% | 4,583 |
| Walsh | 2,837 | 49.17% | 917 | 15.89% | 2,009 | 34.82% | 7 | 0.12% | 828 | 14.35% | 5,770 |
| Ward | 4,166 | 47.99% | 721 | 8.31% | 3,784 | 43.59% | 10 | 0.12% | 382 | 4.40% | 8,681 |
| Wells | 1,644 | 44.40% | 138 | 3.73% | 1,917 | 51.77% | 4 | 0.11% | -273 | -7.37% | 3,703 |
| Williams | 1,865 | 36.76% | 308 | 6.07% | 2,859 | 56.36% | 41 | 0.81% | -994 | -19.59% | 5,073 |
| Totals | 94,931 | 47.68% | 13,858 | 6.96% | 89,922 | 45.17% | 370 | 0.19% | 5,009 | 2.52% | 199,081 |

== Analysis ==
With 45.17 percent of the popular vote, North Dakota would prove to be La Follette's second strongest state in the 1924 election in terms of popular vote percentage after Wisconsin. Davis received a mere 6.96% of the vote in North Dakota, his second-weakest state behind neighboring Minnesota. This was one of only two states, the other being Wisconsin, in which La Follette won a majority of counties (32 of 53 counties in North Dakota were carried by him). LaFollette and Coolidge did tie in one state, Nevada, where they both won 8 counties, and Davis won one.

== See also ==
- United States presidential elections in North Dakota
