= 1920 United States presidential election in North Dakota =

- November 2, 1920
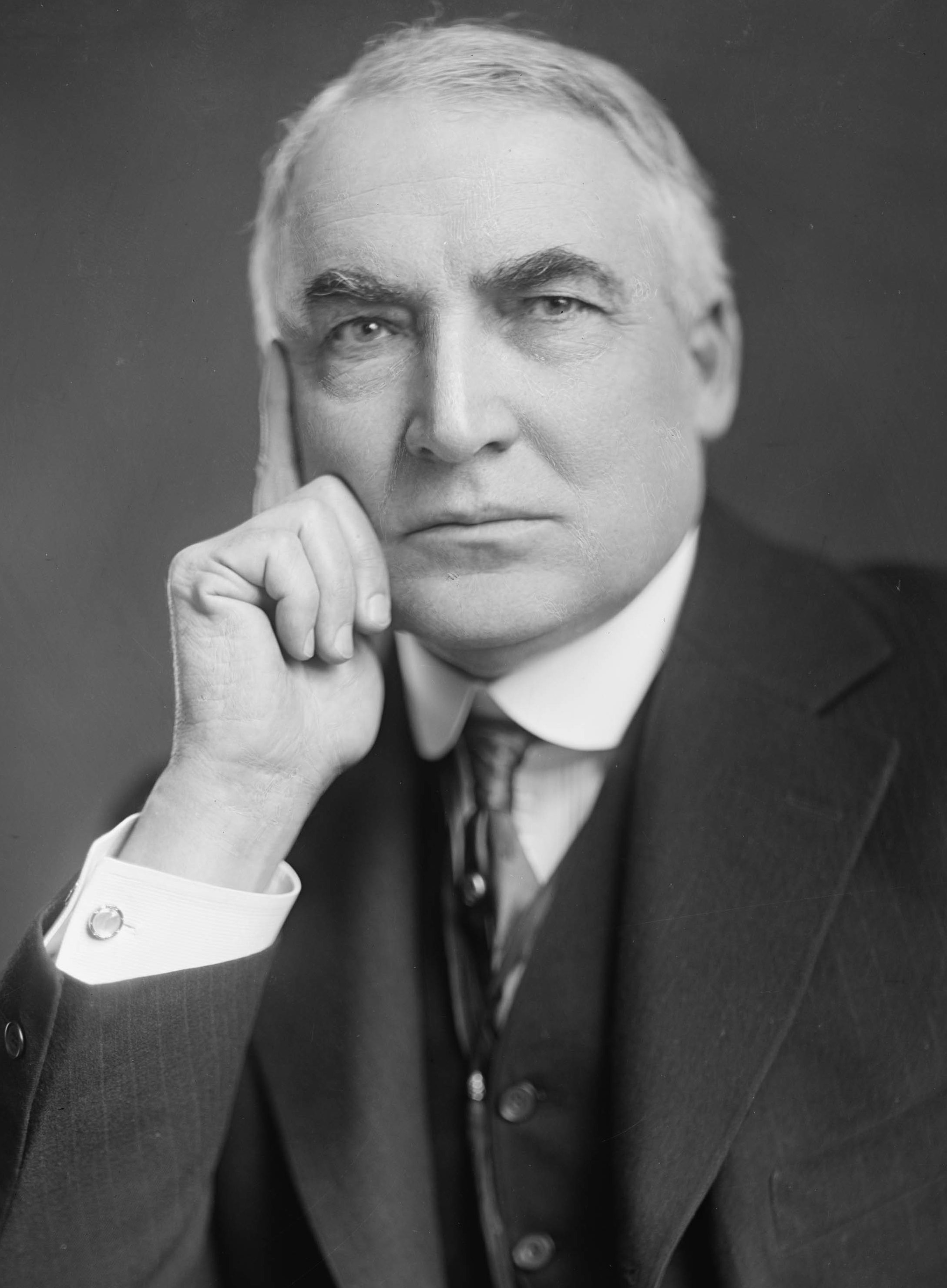

Nominee	Warren G. Harding	James M. Cox
Party	Republican	Democratic
Home state	Ohio	Ohio
Running mate	Calvin Coolidge	Franklin D. Roosevelt
Electoral vote	5	0
Popular vote	160,072	37,422
Percentage	77.97%	18.19%
County results
Harding
60–70%
70–80%
80–90%
90–100%
President before election
Woodrow Wilson
Democratic
Elected President
Warren G. Harding
Republican

The 1920 United States presidential election in North Dakota took place on November 2, 1920, as part of the 1920 United States presidential election which was held throughout all contemporary 48 states. Voters chose five representatives, or electors, to the Electoral College, who voted for president and vice president.

North Dakota voted for Republican nominee, Senator Warren G. Harding of Ohio, over the Democratic nominee, Governor James M. Cox of Ohio. Harding ran with Governor Calvin Coolidge of Massachusetts, while Cox ran with Assistant Secretary of the Navy Franklin D. Roosevelt of New York. Harding won the state by a landslide margin of 59.60 percentage points, the strongest performance of any presidential candidate in state history.

With 77.97 percent of the popular vote, North Dakota would prove to be Harding's strongest state in terms of popular vote percentage and margin of victory.

== Results ==
1920 United States presidential election in North Dakota
Party	Candidate	Running mate	Popular vote		Electoral vote	
Party	Candidate	Running mate	Count	%	Count	%
Republican	Warren G. Harding of Ohio	Calvin Coolidge of Massachusetts	160,072	77.79%	5	100.00%
Democratic	James M. Cox of Ohio	Franklin D. Roosevelt of New York	37,422	18.19%	0	0.00%
Socialist	Eugene V. Debs of Indiana	Seymour Stedman of Illinois	8,282	4.02%	0	0.00%
Total			205,776	100.00%	5	100.00%

=== Results by county ===
County	Warren G. Harding Republican		James M. Cox Democratic		Eugene V. Debs Socialist		Margin		Total votes cast
County	#	%	#	%	#	%	#	%	Total votes cast
Adams	1,377	77.88%	347	19.63%	44	2.49%	1,030	58.26%	1,768
Barnes	5,150	80.27%	1,101	17.16%	165	2.57%	4,049	63.11%	6,416
Benson	3,540	81.10%	680	15.58%	145	3.32%	2,860	65.52%	4,365
Billings	787	91.51%	61	7.09%	12	1.40%	726	84.42%	860
Bottineau	3,487	72.52%	970	20.17%	351	7.30%	2,517	52.35%	4,808
Bowman	1,192	69.79%	321	18.79%	195	11.42%	871	51.00%	1,708
Burke	1,911	70.94%	456	16.93%	327	12.14%	1,455	54.01%	2,694
Burleigh	4,300	77.28%	943	16.95%	321	5.77%	3,357	60.33%	5,564
Cass	10,735	77.02%	2,817	20.21%	386	2.77%	7,918	56.81%	13,938
Cavalier	3,936	79.21%	981	19.74%	52	1.05%	2,955	59.47%	4,969
Dickey	2,887	75.79%	766	20.11%	156	4.10%	2,121	55.68%	3,809
Divide	2,438	80.81%	462	15.31%	117	3.88%	1,976	65.50%	3,017
Dunn	2,102	80.60%	457	17.52%	49	1.88%	1,645	63.08%	2,608
Eddy	1,525	68.76%	577	26.01%	116	5.23%	948	42.74%	2,218
Emmons	2,900	91.77%	238	7.53%	22	0.70%	2,662	84.24%	3,160
Foster	1,583	78.99%	371	18.51%	50	2.50%	1,212	60.48%	2,004
Golden Valley	1,177	77.08%	286	18.73%	64	4.19%	891	58.35%	1,527
Grand Forks	7,646	74.00%	2,527	24.46%	159	1.54%	5,119	49.55%	10,332
Grant	2,184	83.17%	296	11.27%	146	5.56%	1,888	71.90%	2,626
Griggs	1,739	73.84%	530	22.51%	86	3.65%	1,209	51.34%	2,355
Hettinger	1,849	83.44%	327	14.76%	40	1.81%	1,522	68.68%	2,216
Kidder	1,855	80.69%	336	14.62%	108	4.70%	1,519	66.07%	2,299
LaMoure	2,991	77.59%	645	16.73%	219	5.68%	2,346	60.86%	3,855
Logan	1,590	89.68%	154	8.69%	29	1.64%	1,436	80.99%	1,773
McHenry	3,534	74.09%	848	17.78%	388	8.13%	2,686	56.31%	4,770
McIntosh	1,782	94.34%	79	4.18%	28	1.48%	1,703	90.15%	1,889
McKenzie	2,587	79.50%	511	15.70%	156	4.79%	2,076	63.80%	3,254
McLean	3,724	74.23%	748	14.91%	545	10.86%	2,976	59.32%	5,017
Mercer	1,786	87.25%	172	8.40%	89	4.35%	1,614	78.85%	2,047
Morton	4,618	86.37%	632	11.82%	97	1.81%	3,986	74.55%	5,347
Mountrail	2,960	72.73%	687	16.88%	423	10.39%	2,273	55.85%	4,070
Nelson	3,127	84.49%	501	13.54%	73	1.97%	2,626	70.95%	3,701
Oliver	1,105	85.86%	111	8.62%	71	5.52%	994	77.23%	1,287
Pembina	3,925	73.24%	1,405	26.22%	29	0.54%	2,520	47.02%	5,359
Pierce	2,102	84.59%	294	11.83%	89	3.58%	1,808	72.76%	2,485
Ramsey	3,996	79.33%	937	18.60%	104	2.06%	3,059	60.73%	5,037
Ransom	3,010	77.30%	802	20.60%	82	2.11%	2,208	56.70%	3,894
Renville	1,987	73.65%	581	21.53%	130	4.82%	1,406	52.11%	2,698
Richland	5,483	79.46%	1,339	19.41%	78	1.13%	4,144	60.06%	6,900
Rolette	2,139	75.05%	535	18.77%	176	6.18%	1,604	56.28%	2,850
Sargent	2,787	78.18%	673	18.88%	105	2.95%	2,114	59.30%	3,565
Sheridan	1,776	92.12%	134	6.95%	18	0.93%	1,642	85.17%	1,928
Sioux	776	80.75%	163	16.96%	22	2.29%	613	63.79%	961
Slope	1,143	76.56%	235	15.74%	115	7.70%	908	60.82%	1,493
Stark	3,526	86.23%	532	13.01%	31	0.76%	2,994	73.22%	4,089
Steele	2,222	85.17%	337	12.92%	50	1.92%	1,885	72.25%	2,609
Stutsman	5,531	77.41%	1,394	19.51%	220	3.08%	4,137	57.90%	7,145
Towner	2,192	79.33%	476	17.23%	95	3.44%	1,716	62.11%	2,763
Traill	3,666	86.00%	523	12.27%	74	1.74%	3,143	73.73%	4,263
Walsh	4,581	67.13%	2,047	30.00%	196	2.87%	2,534	37.13%	6,824
Ward	6,166	67.41%	2,291	25.05%	690	7.54%	3,875	42.36%	9,147
Wells	3,202	85.71%	456	12.21%	78	2.09%	2,746	73.50%	3,736
Williams	3,768	65.31%	1,330	23.05%	671	11.63%	2,438	42.26%	5,769
Totals	160,072	77.79%	37,422	18.19%	8,282	4.02%	122,650	59.60%	205,776

== See also ==
- United States presidential elections in North Dakota
