= 1916 United States presidential election in North Dakota =

- November 7, 1916

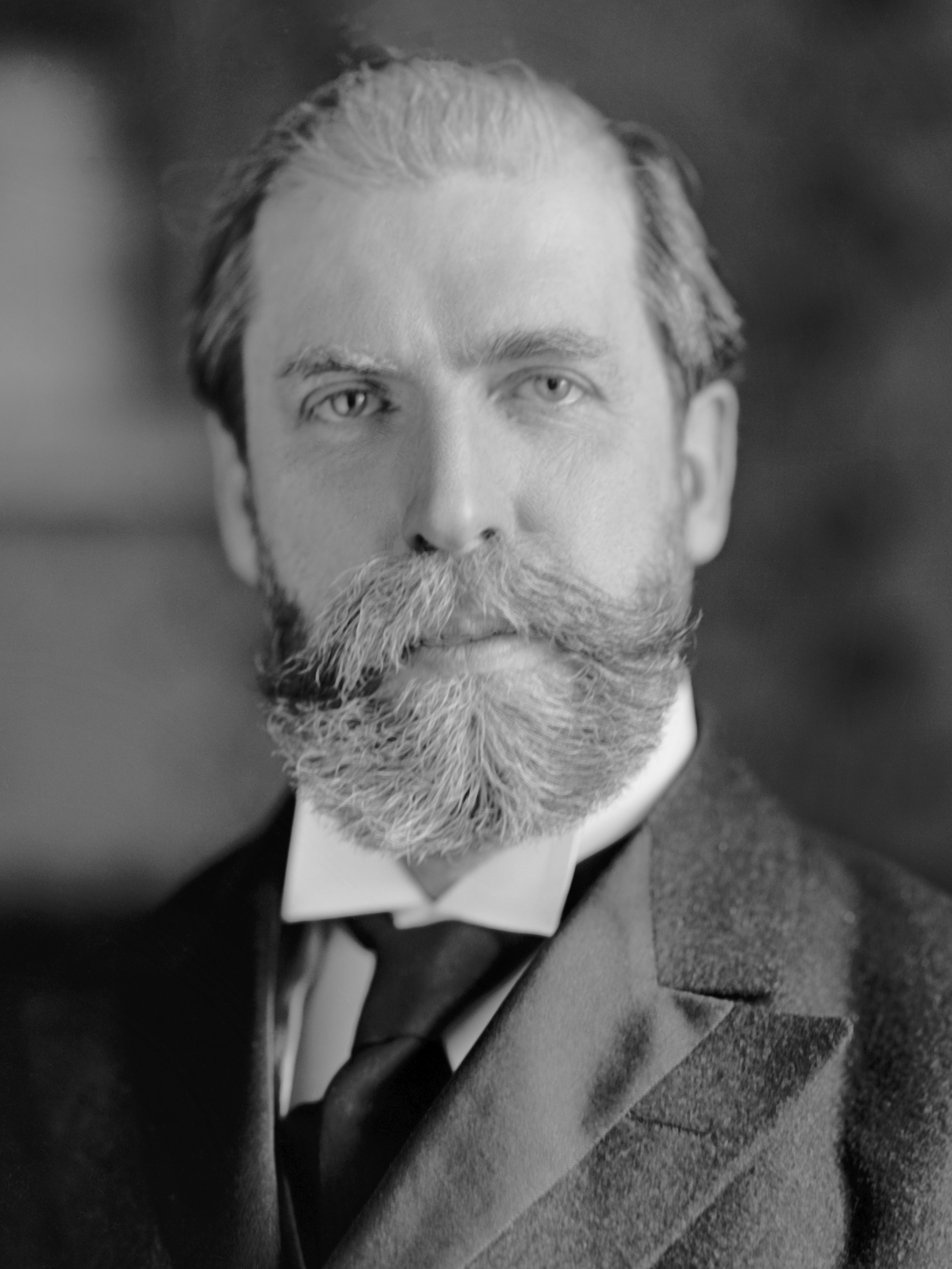
Nominee	Woodrow Wilson	Charles Evans Hughes
Party	Democratic	Republican
Home state	New Jersey	New York
Running mate	Thomas R. Marshall	Charles W. Fairbanks
Electoral vote	5	0
Popular vote	55,206	53,471
Percentage	47.84%	46.34%
County results
Wilson
40–50%
50–60%
60–70%
Hughes
40–50%
50–60%
60–70%
70–80%
President before election
Woodrow Wilson
Democratic
Elected President
Woodrow Wilson
Democratic

The 1916 United States presidential election in North Dakota took place on November 7, 1916. All contemporary forty-eight states were part of the 1916 United States presidential election. Voters chose five electors to the Electoral College, who voted for president and vice president.

North Dakota was won narrowly by incumbent President Woodrow Wilson (D–New Jersey), running with incumbent Vice President Thomas R. Marshall, with 47.84% of the popular vote, against Associate Justice of the U.S. Supreme Court Charles Evans Hughes (R–New York), running with former Vice President Charles W. Fairbanks, with 46.34% of the popular vote. Apart from the state's first presidential election in 1892, this is the closest presidential result on record in North Dakota, although the state was only the sixth-closest of the 1916 election.

Wilson had previously won North Dakota four years earlier. As of the 2024 presidential election, this is the last time that North Dakota voted for a different candidate than neighboring South Dakota, with North Dakota being won by Wilson and South Dakota being won by Hughes.

This is one of just five instances of North Dakota voting Democratic, as along with its Great Plains neighbors, the state would remain almost universally Republican following the 4th party system. The others came in 1912, 1932, 1936, and 1964. As all of these elections were landslide victories for the Democratic party, this is the only time that North Dakota has voted Democratic in a close election.

== Results ==
Presidential candidate	Running mate	Party	Electoral vote (EV)	Popular vote (PV)	
Woodrow Wilson	Thomas R. Marshall	Democratic	5	55,206	47.84%
Charles Evans Hughes	Charles W. Fairbanks	Republican	0	53,471	46.34%
Allan L. Benson	George R. Kirkpatrick	Socialist	0	5,716	4.95%
Frank Hanly	Ira Landrith	Prohibition	0	997	0.86%

=== Results by county ===
County	Woodrow Wilson Democratic		Charles Evans Hughes Republican		Allan L. Benson Socialist		Frank Hanly Prohibition		Margin		Total votes cast
County	#	%	#	%	#	%	#	%	#	%	Total votes cast
Adams	532	49.49%	469	43.63%	63	5.86%	11	1.02%	63	5.86%	1,075
Barnes	1,678	51.57%	1,467	45.08%	75	2.30%	34	1.04%	211	6.48%	3,254
Benson	922	40.62%	1,210	53.30%	109	4.80%	29	1.28%	-288	-12.69%	2,270
Billings	276	44.30%	306	49.12%	36	5.78%	5	0.80%	-30	-4.82%	623
Bottineau	1,471	47.00%	1,294	41.34%	329	10.51%	36	1.15%	177	5.65%	3,130
Bowman	685	59.51%	374	32.49%	88	7.65%	4	0.35%	311	27.02%	1,151
Burke	922	55.84%	518	31.37%	197	11.93%	14	0.85%	404	24.47%	1,651
Burleigh	1,267	48.73%	1,182	45.46%	129	4.96%	22	0.85%	85	3.27%	2,600
Cass	3,303	49.85%	3,093	46.68%	157	2.37%	73	1.10%	210	3.17%	6,626
Cavalier	1,149	42.13%	1,502	55.08%	68	2.49%	8	0.29%	-353	-12.94%	2,727
Dickey	920	44.47%	1,037	50.12%	99	4.78%	13	0.63%	-117	-5.65%	2,069
Divide	950	52.95%	707	39.41%	126	7.02%	11	0.61%	243	13.55%	1,794
Dunn	1,028	62.53%	566	34.43%	46	2.80%	4	0.24%	462	28.10%	1,644
Eddy	650	51.75%	505	40.21%	89	7.09%	12	0.96%	145	11.54%	1,256
Emmons	609	35.28%	1,090	63.15%	25	1.45%	2	0.12%	-481	-27.87%	1,726
Foster	662	53.60%	549	44.45%	14	1.13%	10	0.81%	113	9.15%	1,235
Golden Valley	697	54.93%	499	39.32%	63	4.96%	10	0.79%	198	15.60%	1,269
Grand Forks	2,814	54.66%	2,159	41.94%	125	2.43%	50	0.97%	655	12.72%	5,148
Griggs	668	52.39%	521	40.86%	59	4.63%	27	2.12%	147	11.53%	1,275
Hettinger	661	41.44%	856	53.67%	67	4.20%	11	0.69%	-195	-12.23%	1,595
Kidder	650	46.07%	604	42.81%	134	9.50%	23	1.63%	46	3.26%	1,411
LaMoure	990	45.08%	1,045	47.59%	141	6.42%	20	0.91%	-55	-2.50%	2,196
Logan	260	29.41%	567	64.14%	51	5.77%	6	0.68%	-307	-34.73%	884
McHenry	1,316	59.57%	692	31.33%	185	8.37%	16	0.72%	624	28.25%	2,209
McIntosh	270	21.99%	950	77.36%	7	0.57%	1	0.08%	-680	-55.37%	1,228
McKenzie	1,456	47.17%	1,394	45.16%	200	6.48%	37	1.20%	62	2.01%	3,087
McLean	1,210	47.81%	1,054	41.64%	247	9.76%	20	0.79%	156	6.16%	2,531
Mercer	353	31.02%	730	64.15%	52	4.57%	3	0.26%	-377	-33.13%	1,138
Morton	1,835	37.13%	2,785	56.35%	299	6.05%	23	0.47%	-950	-19.22%	4,942
Mountrail	1,262	55.67%	740	32.64%	231	10.19%	34	1.50%	522	23.03%	2,267
Nelson	861	43.33%	1,013	50.98%	77	3.88%	36	1.81%	-152	-7.65%	1,987
Oliver	327	45.17%	346	47.79%	48	6.63%	3	0.41%	-19	-2.62%	724
Pembina	1,400	48.33%	1,469	50.71%	16	0.55%	12	0.41%	-69	-2.38%	2,897
Pierce	789	49.69%	703	44.27%	74	4.66%	22	1.39%	86	5.42%	1,588
Ramsey	1,331	51.13%	1,169	44.91%	90	3.46%	13	0.50%	162	6.22%	2,603
Ransom	1,121	49.04%	1,093	47.81%	45	1.97%	27	1.18%	28	1.22%	2,286
Renville	1,012	59.99%	532	31.54%	119	7.05%	24	1.42%	480	28.45%	1,687
Richland	1,772	45.00%	2,097	53.25%	41	1.04%	28	0.71%	-325	-8.25%	3,938
Rolette	762	50.80%	600	40.00%	132	8.80%	6	0.40%	162	10.80%	1,500
Sargent	868	43.49%	1,050	52.61%	67	3.36%	11	0.55%	-182	-9.12%	1,996
Sheridan	310	26.91%	807	70.05%	25	2.17%	10	0.87%	-497	-43.14%	1,152
Sioux	200	43.20%	232	50.11%	24	5.18%	7	1.51%	-32	-6.91%	463
Slope	867	58.54%	516	34.84%	91	6.14%	7	0.47%	351	23.70%	1,481
Stark	953	39.30%	1,409	58.10%	57	2.35%	6	0.25%	-456	-18.80%	2,425
Steele	515	40.62%	676	53.31%	71	5.60%	6	0.47%	-161	-12.70%	1,268
Stutsman	1,846	50.67%	1,664	45.68%	109	2.99%	24	0.66%	182	5.00%	3,643
Towner	769	50.53%	665	43.69%	77	5.06%	11	0.72%	104	6.83%	1,522
Traill	664	30.15%	1,423	64.62%	72	3.27%	43	1.95%	-759	-34.47%	2,202
Walsh	2,003	52.54%	1,670	43.81%	126	3.31%	13	0.34%	333	8.74%	3,812
Ward	2,791	56.74%	1,743	35.43%	301	6.12%	84	1.71%	1,048	21.31%	4,919
Wells	810	38.70%	1,226	58.58%	48	2.29%	9	0.43%	-416	-19.88%	2,093
Williams	1,769	55.40%	903	28.28%	495	15.50%	26	0.81%	866	27.12%	3,193
Totals	55,206	47.84%	53,471	46.34%	5,716	4.95%	997	0.86%	1,735	1.50%	115,390

== See also ==
- United States presidential elections in North Dakota
