= Washington Irving Warrey =

Coordinates: 47°9′57.5″N 97°34′38.6″W

Washington Irving Warrey (August 23, 1855 – June 5, 1933) was an American pioneer settler and county official in Steele County in the U.S. state of North Dakota. He operated a hotel in Sherbrooke, North Dakota and served as county judge from 1894 to 1905.

== Early life ==
Washington I. Warrey was born in Columbia County, New York, August 25, 1855. He and his younger sister were the only two children born to Robert and Hannah (Carver) Warrey. His father had three children from a previous marriage as did his mother, for a total of eight children. When Warrey was a child, the family moved to Binghamton, New York, where his father worked at contracting and building. Robert Warrey was an architect and designer, and also worked as a carpenter. During the U.S. Civil War, his father was in charge of a force of pontoon and bridge builders.

=== College ===
Robert died when Washington was nine years old, and Washington then went to live on a farm for two years. When his mother died in 1867, he moved in with an uncle, who was appointed his guardian. At the age of 17, he became an apprentice mason, but eventual sought a more liberal education. At age 19, he enrolled in the Delaware Literary Institute at Franklin, New York, where he studied for four years. He studies are frequently interrupted by several terms where he taught school in the village and countryside. Education was a part of his family history, as a number of his mother's relatives had been leading professors in Amherst College and other universities in the east.

Mr. Warrey eventually wanted to pursue law practice. In 1880 he moved to Wyandotte County in Kansas where he worked as a carpenter and as a member of the local police force, and studied law in his spare time. This added strain caused his health to deteriorate, so he began carpentry work full-time and later became foreman of a crew for the Kansas City, Fort Scott and Memphis Railway Company.

Warrey was a member of the Masons, the Independent Order of Odd Fellows, and the Modern Woodmen of America.

== North Dakota ==
Washington I. Warrey's health never did improve, so in August 1884 he moved to Fargo, then part of Dakota Territory. He taught school for several winters in Steele and Cass Counties. He married Rose L. Wallace, a resident of Page, in 1888. They had four children, Victor I., Edward R., Lillian E., and Washington I.

In the spring of 1895, he filed a land claim in Broadlawn Township in Steele County. He performed contract work out of Hope, North Dakota, until 1893 when he moved to Sherbrooke, North Dakota. In June of that year, he purchased the Sherbrooke House Hotel in Sherbrooke, and worked as a hotel and livery barn operator.

Warrey, a Republican was elected as Steele County's surveyor in 1890, and elected Steele County judge in 1894. He served in that position until 1905. He also twice served as the county's deputy sheriff.

Warrey died in 1933 and is buried in the family plot in the Page Cemetery.
