= Finley Township =

Finley Township may refer to the following townships in the United States:

- Finley Township, Scott County, Indiana
- Finley Township, Steele County, North Dakota
- Finley Township, Decatur County, Kansas
- Finley Township, Webster County, Missouri

== See also ==
- East Finley Township, Washington County, Pennsylvania
- West Finley Township, Pennsylvania
