= Luverne, North Dakota =

Luverne
- City
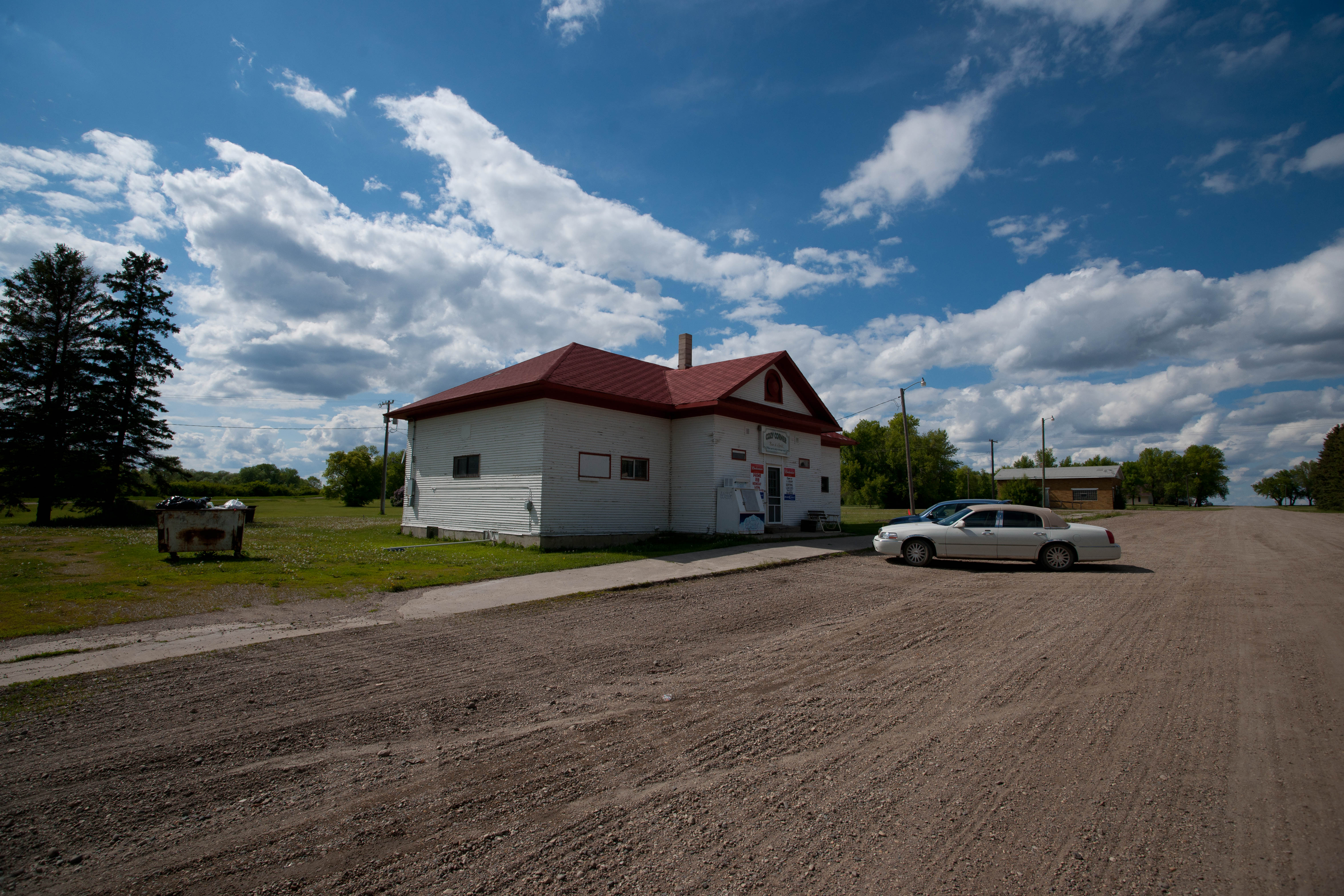
- Store in Luverne

- Location of Luverne, North Dakota
- Coordinates: 47°15′05″N 97°56′05″W
- Country: United States
- State: North Dakota
- County: Steele
- Founded: 1912

Area
  - Total: 0.25 sq mi (0.66 km^{2})
  - Land: 0.25 sq mi (0.66 km^{2})
  - Water: 0 sq mi (0.00 km^{2})
- Elevation: 1,421 ft (433 m)

Population (2020)
  - Total: 28
  - Estimate (2022): 27
  - Density: 109.5/sq mi (42.27/km^{2})
- Time zone: UTC-6 (Central (CST))
  - Summer (DST): UTC-5 (CDT)
- ZIP code: 58056
- Area code: 701
- FIPS code: 38-48580
- GNIS feature ID: 1036138

Luverne is a city in Steele County, North Dakota, United States. The population was 28 at the 2020 census. Luverne was founded in 1912.

== Geography ==
Luverne is located in southwest Steele County, about a mile north of the Steele County-Barnes County line on Steele County Highway 25. Luverne is approximately four miles (6 km) east of the Steele County-Griggs County line. Luverne is several miles away from Lake Ashtabula, a man-made reservoir on the Sheyenne River. Luverne's closest neighbor is Sibley, four miles (6 km) away.

According to the United States Census Bureau, the city has a total area of 0.26 square miles (0.67 km^{2}), all land.

== Demographics ==
Historical population
Census	Pop.	Note	%±
1920	225		—
1930	177		−21.3%
1940	187		5.6%
1950	154		−17.6%
1960	109		−29.2%
1970	84		−22.9%
1980	65		−22.6%
1990	41		−36.9%
2000	44		7.3%
2010	31		−29.5%
2020	28		−9.7%
2022 (est.)	27		−3.6%
U.S. Decennial Census; 2020 Census

=== 2010 census ===
As of the census of 2010, there were 31 people, 17 households, and 9 families residing in the city. The population density was 119.2 inhabitants per square mile (46.0/km^{2}). There were 21 housing units at an average density of 80.8 per square mile (31.2/km^{2}). The racial makeup of the city was 90.3% White, 6.5% Native American, and 3.2% from two or more races.

There were 17 households, of which 17.6% had children under the age of 18 living with them, 35.3% were married couples living together, 11.8% had a female householder with no husband present, 5.9% had a male householder with no wife present, and 47.1% were non-families. 41.2% of all households were made up of individuals, and 5.9% had someone living alone who was 65 years of age or older. The average household size was 1.82 and the average family size was 2.44.

The median age in the city was 43.5 years. 16.1% of residents were under the age of 18; 0.1% were between the ages of 18 and 24; 38.8% were from 25 to 44; 29% were from 45 to 64; and 16.1% were 65 years of age or older. The gender makeup of the city was 54.8% male and 45.2% female.

=== 2000 census ===
As of the census of 2000, there were 44 people, 16 households, and 12 families residing in the city. The population density was 170.6 inhabitants per square mile (65.9/km^{2}). There were 23 housing units at an average density of 89.2 per square mile (34.4/km^{2}). The racial makeup of the city was 97.73% White and 2.27% Native American.

There were 16 households, out of which 37.5% had children under the age of 18 living with them, 75.0% were married couples living together, and 25.0% were non-families. 18.8% of all households were made up of individuals, and none had someone living alone who was 65 years of age or older. The average household size was 2.75 and the average family size was 3.25.

In the city, the population was spread out, with 31.8% under the age of 18, 2.3% from 18 to 24, 29.5% from 25 to 44, 20.5% from 45 to 64, and 15.9% who were 65 years of age or older. The median age was 33 years. For every 100 females, there were 76.0 males. For every 100 females age 18 and over, there were 100.0 males.

The median income for a household in the city was $37,188, and the median income for a family was $37,188. Males had a median income of $26,875 versus $13,750 for females. The per capita income for the city was $12,042. None of the population and none of the families were below the poverty line.

== Economy ==
Luverne has two businesses located within the city limits. The first is Luverne Farmers Elevator, a grain handling and shipping facility.

Luverne is also home to a number of larger farm operations in the region, both grain and livestock operations. Luverne also boasts a hunting preserve as one of its area businesses.

== Education ==
Luverne is within the Hope-Page Public Schools.

Luverne had its own K-12 school system until the early 1970s. At that time, Luverne merged with the Hope, school district. Luverne's school aged population is bused to Hope, 15 miles (24 km) away, or Page 22 miles (35 km) away, for education, depending on their secondary or elementary status. The school's activities have been merged with the Finley-Sharon school district, two other communities in Steele County. With this merger, a great deal of Steele County is now groups for extracurricular activities together, laying the groundwork for a possible future merger of the entire region into one school district.
