= Colgate, North Dakota =

Unincorporated community in North Dakota, US

Colgate
- Unincorporated community
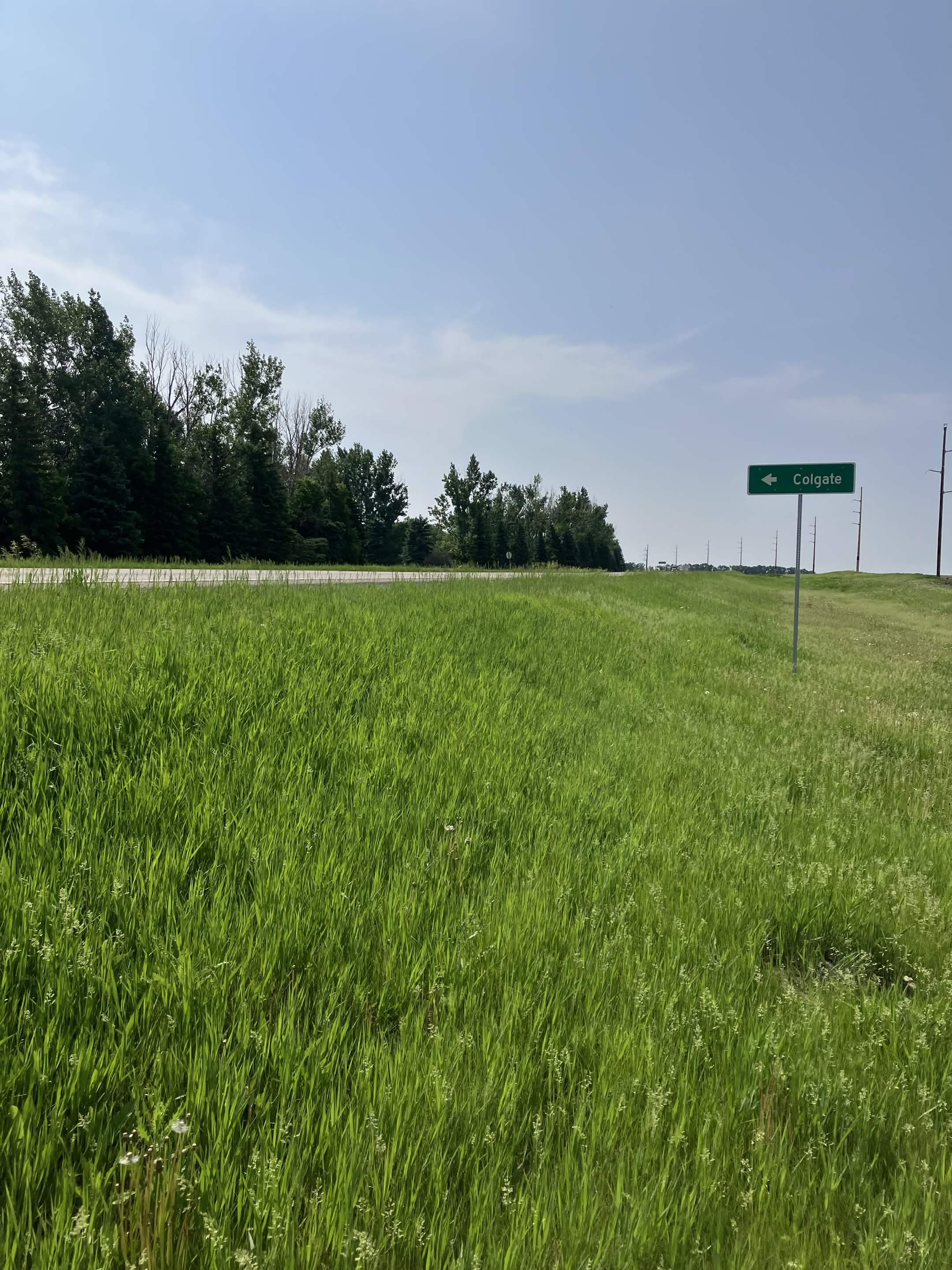

- Location within North Dakota
- Coordinates: 47°14′41″N 97°39′23″W
- Country: United States
- State: North Dakota
- County: Steele County
- Elevation: 1,181 ft (360 m)

Population
  - Total: 62
- ZIP Code: 58046
- GNIS feature ID: 1028423

Colgate is an unincorporated community in Steele County, North Dakota, United States.

== Founding ==
The townsite was founded in 1882. A post office called Colgate was established in 1883 and remained in operation until 1972. The community is named after James Boorman Colgate, who was the largest landowner with 4,000 acres (16 km^{2}) that he purchased from the Northern Pacific Railway.

== Schools ==
There was a Colgate School District, but after the school closed in 1964, children began attending schools in Hope and Page (now the Hope-Page School District).

== Climate ==
Colgate has a humid continental climate (Köppen Dfb), bordering on a dry-winter humid continental climate (Köppen Dwb).

Climate data for Colgate, North Dakota, 1991–2020 normals, 1915-2020 extremes: 1180ft (360m)
Month	Jan	Feb	Mar	Apr	May	Jun	Jul	Aug	Sep	Oct	Nov	Dec	Year
Record high °F (°C)	52 (11)	56 (13)	82 (28)	100 (38)	100 (38)	101 (38)	114 (46)	107 (42)	104 (40)	92 (33)	77 (25)	70 (21)	114 (46)
Mean maximum °F (°C)	38.8 (3.8)	42.4 (5.8)	55.4 (13.0)	80.0 (26.7)	88.1 (31.2)	91.1 (32.8)	93.7 (34.3)	94.4 (34.7)	89.5 (31.9)	78.0 (25.6)	58.0 (14.4)	41.0 (5.0)	97.0 (36.1)
Mean daily maximum °F (°C)	14.1 (−9.9)	18.7 (−7.4)	32.2 (0.1)	50.5 (10.3)	65.4 (18.6)	75.3 (24.1)	80.5 (26.9)	79.3 (26.3)	69.6 (20.9)	53.4 (11.9)	34.6 (1.4)	20.2 (−6.6)	49.5 (9.7)
Daily mean °F (°C)	4.1 (−15.5)	8.1 (−13.3)	22.8 (−5.1)	39.6 (4.2)	53.8 (12.1)	64.3 (17.9)	68.7 (20.4)	66.6 (19.2)	57.0 (13.9)	42.3 (5.7)	25.3 (−3.7)	11.5 (−11.4)	38.7 (3.7)
Mean daily minimum °F (°C)	−6.0 (−21.1)	−2.6 (−19.2)	13.4 (−10.3)	28.7 (−1.8)	42.1 (5.6)	53.4 (11.9)	56.8 (13.8)	53.9 (12.2)	44.3 (6.8)	31.2 (−0.4)	16.1 (−8.8)	2.8 (−16.2)	27.8 (−2.3)
Mean minimum °F (°C)	−25.1 (−31.7)	−22.6 (−30.3)	−8.1 (−22.3)	14.4 (−9.8)	26.9 (−2.8)	40.0 (4.4)	46.2 (7.9)	41.3 (5.2)	28.6 (−1.9)	17.0 (−8.3)	−2.8 (−19.3)	−19.7 (−28.7)	−28.6 (−33.7)
Record low °F (°C)	−40 (−40)	−37 (−38)	−31 (−35)	−10 (−23)	13 (−11)	24 (−4)	36 (2)	27 (−3)	15 (−9)	−7 (−22)	−31 (−35)	−34 (−37)	−40 (−40)
Average precipitation inches (mm)	0.51 (13)	0.46 (12)	0.84 (21)	0.94 (24)	3.15 (80)	3.58 (91)	3.30 (84)	2.51 (64)	2.73 (69)	1.58 (40)	0.71 (18)	0.57 (14)	20.88 (530)
Average snowfall inches (cm)	8.40 (21.3)	5.00 (12.7)	4.50 (11.4)	1.60 (4.1)	0.00 (0.00)	0.00 (0.00)	0.00 (0.00)	0.00 (0.00)	0.00 (0.00)	0.80 (2.0)	8.00 (20.3)	6.40 (16.3)	34.7 (88.1)
Source 1: NOAA
Source 2: XMACIS (records & 1981-2010 monthly max/mins)

== Demographics ==
=== 2020 census ===
As of the census of 2020, there were 62 people, 28 households, and 24 families living in the city. There were 30 housing units. The racial makeup of the city was 94.8% White and Hispanic or Latino of any race were 3.2% of the population.

== Gallery ==
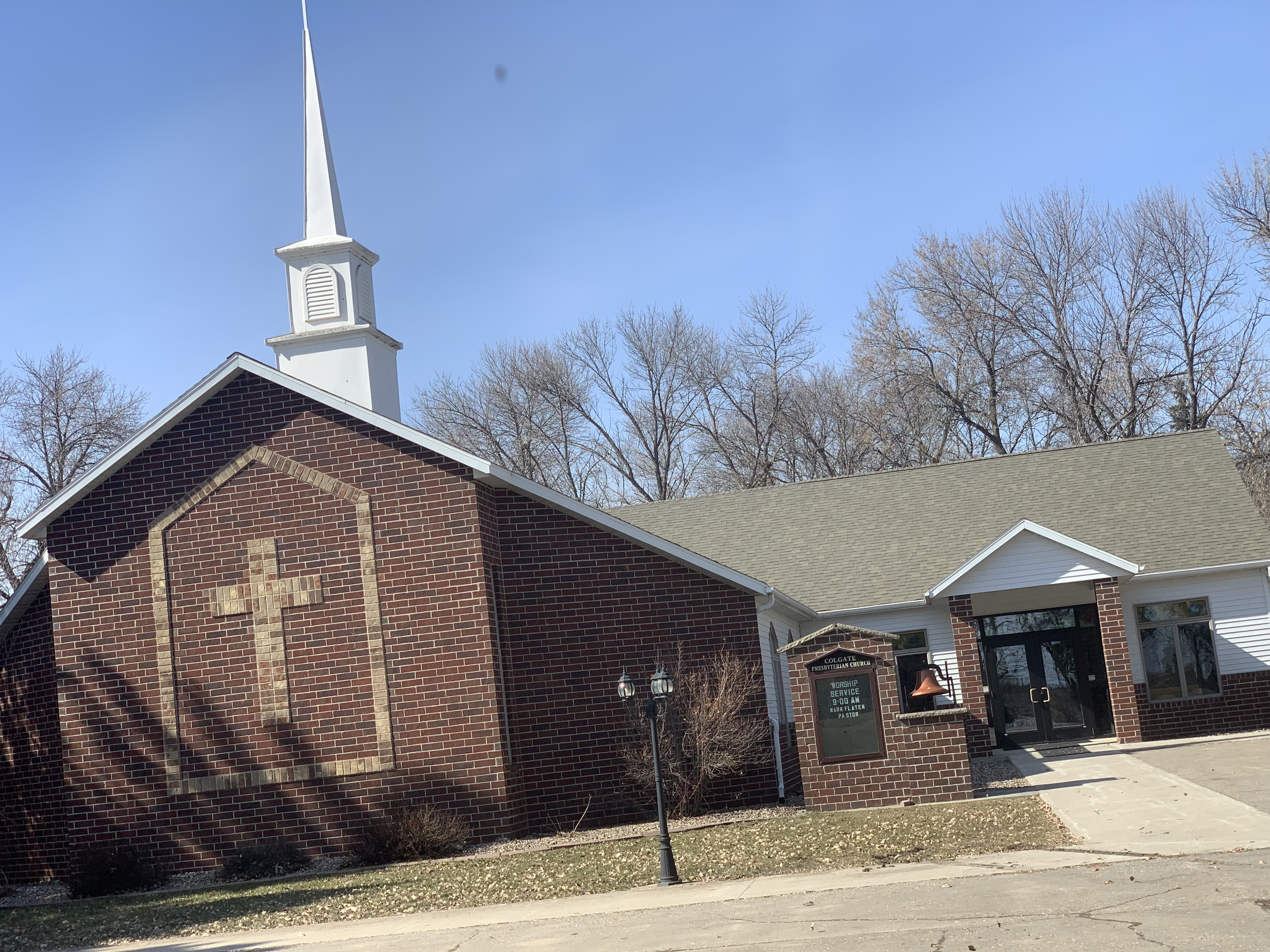
Colgate Presbyterian Church

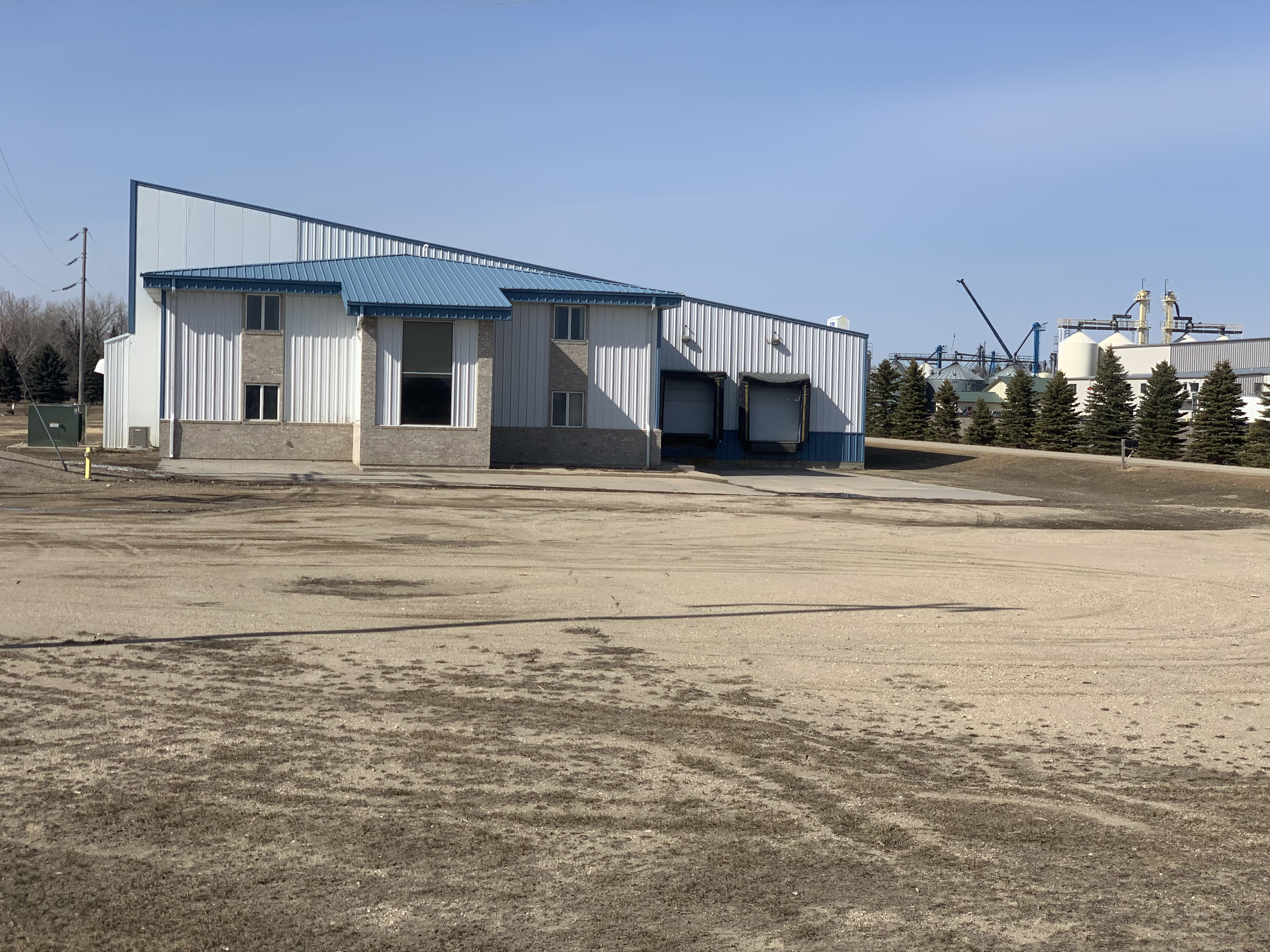
Old packaging plant, Now owned by Erickson Custom Operations
