= Steele County Courthouse (North Dakota) =

- U.S. National Register of Historic Places
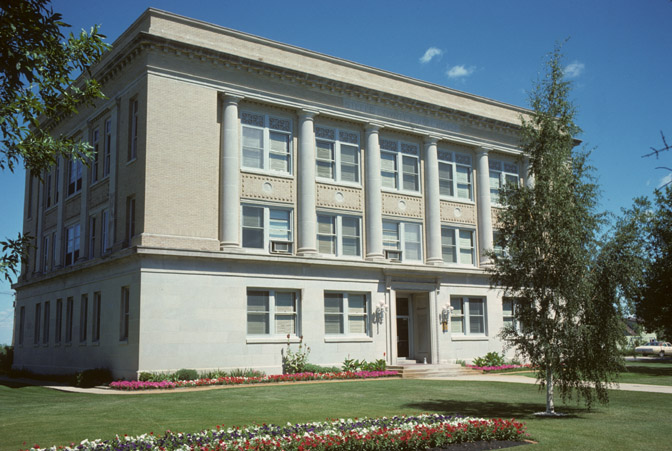

- Location within North Dakota Location within the United States
- Location: 201 Washington Ave., Finley, North Dakota
- Coordinates: 47°30′52″N 97°50′16″W
- Built: 1925
- Built by: Ostby, T. & Son
- Architect: Braseth & Houkom
- Architectural style: Classical Revival
- MPS: North Dakota County Courthouses TR
- NRHP reference No.: 85002995
- Added to NRHP: November 14, 1985

Steele County Courthouse in Finley, North Dakota was built in 1925. It was listed on the National Register of Historic Places in 1985.

It was designed in very pure Classical Revival style by architects Braseth & Houkum. It is a three-story 89 feet (27 m) by 64 feet (20 m) brick building.

Its construction ended contention between Finley and Hope, North Dakota claimants for the county seat.
