= Finley Township, Steele County, North Dakota =

Township in North Dakota, U.S.

Coordinates: 47°26′54″N 97°39′17″W

Finley Township is a township in Steele County in the U.S. state of North Dakota. Its population as of the 2000 Census was 64, which had dropped to an estimated 47 people as of 2009. The county seat of Finley, North Dakota is located in the township and shares its name.

== History ==
Finley Township was originally called Highland Township, until the name was changed in 1904. The township had a peak population of 350 in 1900. Finley village was incorporated from part of the township in 1908, reducing its size and population. The county seat for Steele County was moved to Finley from Sherbrooke in 1919 after a vote of the county residents.

== Geography ==
According to the United States Census Bureau, the township has a total area of 32.47 square miles (84.1 km^{2}), of which 0.08 square miles (0.21 km^{2}) is water.

== Demographics ==
Historical population
Census	Pop.	Note	%±
1890	92		—
1900	350		280.4%
1910	267		−23.7%
1920	275		3.0%
1930	283		2.9%
1940	211		−25.4%
1950	151		−28.4%
1960	150		−0.7%
1970	79		−47.3%
1980	81		2.5%
1990	65		−19.8%
2000	64		−1.5%
2009 (est.)	47

As of the 2000 Census, there were 62 people, 22 households, and 19 families residing in the township. The population density was 1.7 square miles (4.4 km^{2}). There were 25 housing units at an average density of 0.7 square miles (1.8 km^{2}). The racial makeup of the township was 98.4% White, with 1.6% reporting two or more races. The top two ancestry groups in the township were German with 34% and Norwegian with 33%.

Of the 22 households in the township, 40.9% had children under the age of 18 living with them, 81.8% were married couples living together. Only 13.6% were non-families. The average household size was 2.91 and the average family size was 3.21.

The township's population was spread out, with 37.8% under the age of 18, 23.4% from 25 to 44, 25.0% from 45 to 64, and 17.2% who were 65 years of age or older. The median age was 40.5 years.

The median household income for the township was $51,875, and the median family income was $56,250. Males had a median income of $38,125 versus $23,250 for females, with a per capita income of $26,196. About 3% of population was below the poverty line.
