= Steele County Courthouse =

Steele County Courthouse may refer to:

- Steele County Courthouse (Minnesota), Owatonna, Minnesota
- Steele County Courthouse (North Dakota), Finley, North Dakota
