= 1929 New York City aldermanic presidential election =

- November 5, 1929
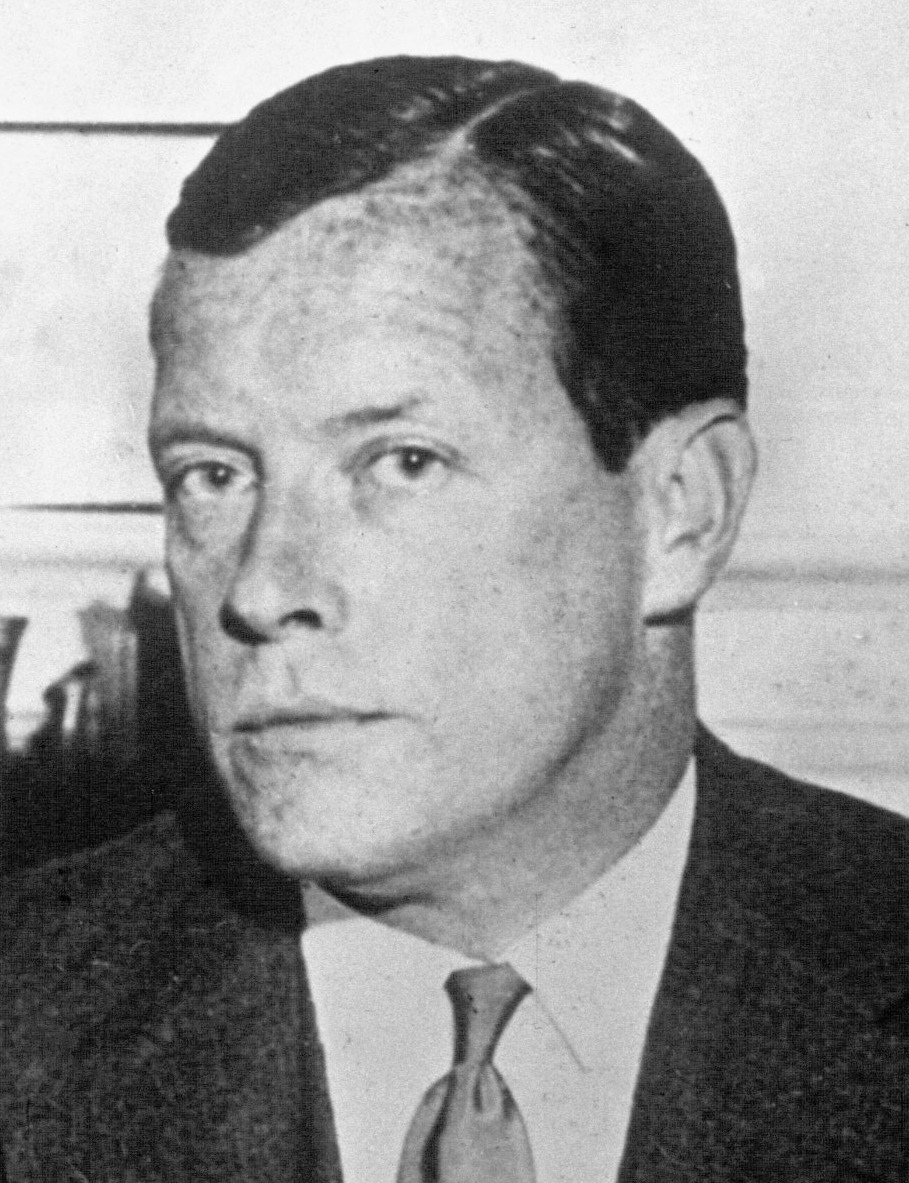

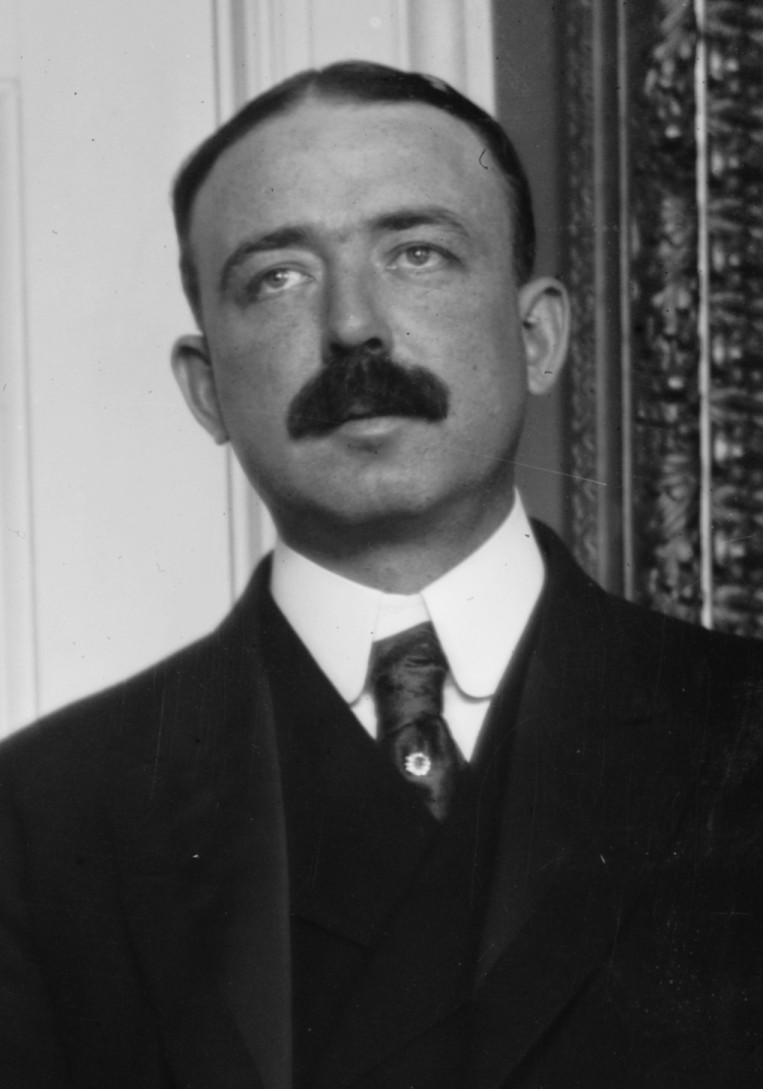
Nominee	Joseph V. McKee	Bird Sim Coler
Party	Democratic	Republican
Popular vote	890,635	385,514
Percentage	69.79%	30.21%
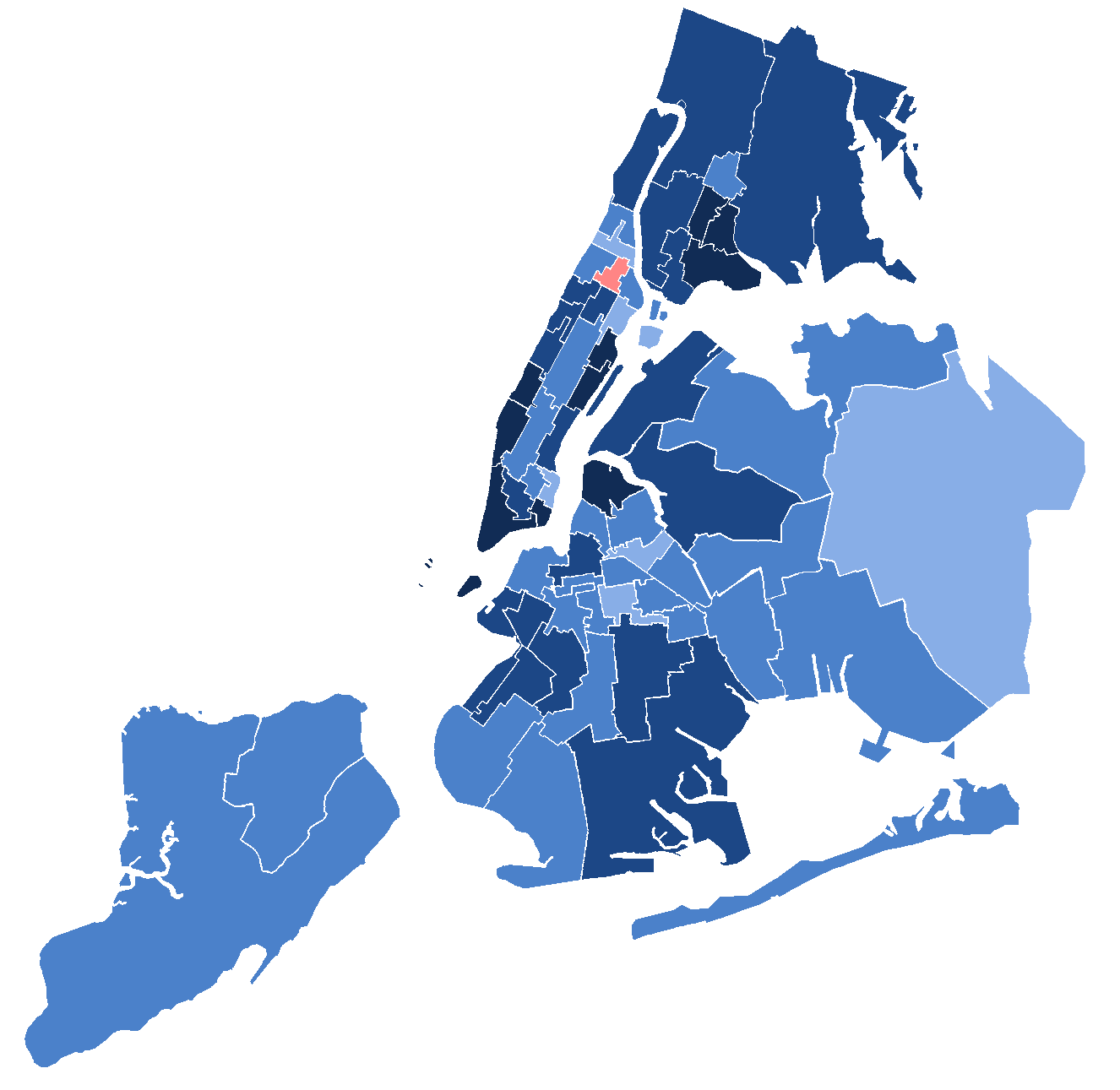
- Results by Assembly district
President of the Board of Aldermen before election
Joseph V. McKee
Democratic
Elected President of the Board of Aldermen
Joseph V. McKee
Democratic

An election was held on November 5, 1929, to elect the President of the New York City Board of Aldermen, in concert with other such contests as the mayoralty, Comptroller, the remainder of the Board of Aldermen, County Sheriffs, Borough presidents, and other miscellaneous questions on the ballot. Democratic incumbent Joseph V. McKee of The Bronx defeated Republican candidate Bird Sim Coler of Brooklyn, himself an independent Democrat, 890,655 votes to 385,514. This combined with Democratic victories in other contests formed what was considered "a Crushing Defeat to [the] City G.O.P. [delivered]" by Tammany Hall.

== General election ==
=== Candidates ===
- Bird Sim Coler, former New York City Comptroller and Brooklyn Borough President (Republican)
- Joseph V. McKee, incumbent president since 1927

=== Results ===
1929 New York City aldermanic presidential election
Party	Candidate	Votes	%	±%
Democratic	Joseph V. McKee (incumbent)	890,635	69.79%	
Republican	Bird Sim Coler	385,514	30.21%	
Total votes		1,276,149	100.00%	
