= Charles M. Preston =

American politician (1848–1909)

Charles More Preston (November 6, 1848 – November 16, 1909) was an American lawyer and banker from New York City.

== Life ==
Preston was born on November 6, 1848, in Roxbury, New York, the son of Otis Monroe Preston and Susan Ann More.

While working on his father's farm, Preston attended the Roxbury Academy and the Delaware Literary Institute in Franklin. He graduated from the latter school in 1869. Later that year, he went to Poughkeepsie and studied law in the office of Allard Anthony, the County Judge of Dutchess County. In 1870, he began studying at the Albany Law School. He graduated from there in 1871, and after he was admitted to the bar later that year he moved to Rondout, later part of Kingston. He became general counsel for the National Bank of Rondout shortly afterwards. In 1877, he formed a law partnership with Howard Chipp Jr. known as Preston & Chipp. He served as corporation counsel for the city of Kingston from 1878 to 1882.

In 1887, Preston became a member of the New York State Democratic Committee. In 1889, he unsuccessfully ran for County Judge as a Democrat, losing the election to Alphonso T. Clearwater. In 1890, Governor Hill appointed him Superintendent of the New York State Banking Department, a position he held for two terms. At the end of his term of Superintendent, he became president of the Equitable Securities Company in New York City, a liquidated institution he helped revive. He was also president of the National Bank Rondout from 1897 to 1902, and a receiver of the New York Building Loan-Banking Company until he left for health reasons in 1908. In the 1902 New York state election, he was considered as a nominee for Governor of New York, but the nomination went to Bird Sim Coler. He instead became the candidate for New York State Comptroller, although he lost the election to Nathan L. Miller.

Preston was also president of the Kingston Board of Water Commissioners, president and director of the Kingston Consolidated Railroad Company and the Lincoln Milling Company, and president of the Colonial City Traction Company of Kingston.

Preston was a member of the New York State Bar Association since 1886. He was a member of the Freemasons, the Odd Fellows, and the Knights of Pythias. In 1876, he married Mary Hasbrouck. Their children were Charlotte, Susan, Eloise Ostrander, and Jansen Hasbrouck.

Preston died at home on November 16, 1909. He was buried in Wiltwyck Cemetery in Kingston.

Party political offices
Preceded by Edward S. Atwater	Democratic nominee for New York State Comptroller; 1902	Succeeded by George Hall
