= Sherbrooke Township, Steele County, North Dakota =

Coordinates: 47°26′54″N 97°39′17″W

Sherbrooke Township
- Township
- Location in North Dakota
- Country: United States
- State: North Dakota
- County: Steele
- Established: 1885

Area
  - Total: 36.0 sq mi (93.2 km^{2})

Population (2009)
  - Total: 46
- Time zone: UTC-6 (CST)

Sherbrooke Township is a township in Steele County in the U.S. state of North Dakota. Its population as of the 2020 Census was 46. The township shares its name with Sherbrooke, North Dakota, which was the county seat from 1885 to 1919.

== History ==
Sherbrooke Township was organized in 1885 from survey township 146N, Range 55W. The first settlers were principally of Norwegian, Canadian, and American ancestry. Though the township was not on a major rail line, the promise of future rail service led to a growth in population with a high of 303 people in 1910. However, rail service never materialized, and in 1919 voters in Steele County decided to move the county seat to Finley, which was closer to the railroad. Losing the county seat eventually led to Sherbrooke township's gradual decline.

== Geography ==
Sherbrooke Township is located in the central part of Steele County.

== Demographics ==
Historical population
Census	Pop.	Note	%±
1890	152		—
1900	250		64.5%
1910	303		21.2%
1920	217		−28.4%
1930	263		21.2%
1940	233		−11.4%
1950	184		−21.0%
1960	157		−14.7%
1970	112		−28.7%
1980	85		−24.1%
1990	59		−30.6%
2000	62		5.1%
2009 (est.)	46

As of the 2020 Census, there were 46 people and 16 families residing in the township. The racial makeup of the township was 100.0% White. The top ancestry groups in the township were Norwegian with 39%, German with 28%, and Swedish with 11%.

Of the 23 households in the township, 34.8% had children under the age of 18 living with them, 69.6% were married couples living together. Only 26.1% were non-families. The average household size was 2.70 and the average family size was 3.29.
