= Colgate Township, Steele County, North Dakota =

Coordinates: 47°16′N 97°36′W

Colgate Township
- Township
- Interactive map of Colgate Township
- Country: United States
- State: North Dakota
- County: Steele County

Area
  - Total: 35.4 sq mi (92 km^{2})
  - Land: 35.4 sq mi (92 km^{2})
  - Water: 0 sq mi (0 km^{2}) 0%

Population (2020)
  - Total: 62
  - Density: 1.8/sq mi (0.68/km^{2})
- Time zone: UTC-6 (CST)
  - Summer (DST): UTC-5 (CDT)

Colgate Township is a civil township in Steele County, North Dakota, United States. As of the 2020 census, its population is 62.
