= Baldwin's Arcade =

- U.S. National Register of Historic Places
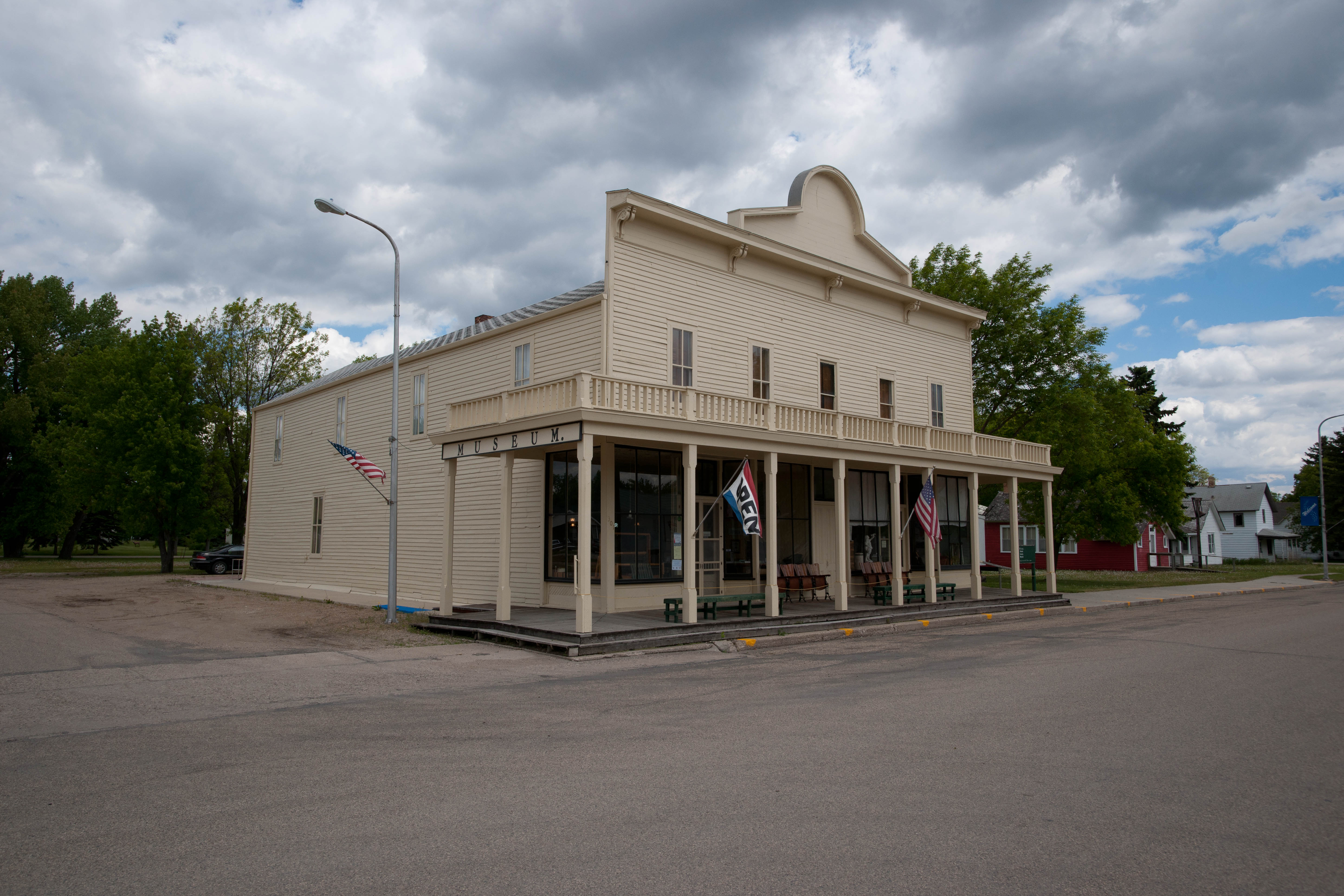
- Building in 2009

- Location within North Dakota Location within the United States
- Location: Steele Ave. and 3rd St., Hope, North Dakota
- Coordinates: 47°19′21″N 97°43′15″W
- Area: less than one acre
- Built: 1881
- NRHP reference No.: 75001306
- Added to NRHP: February 18, 1975

Baldwin's Arcade in Hope, North Dakota was built in 1881. It was listed on the National Register of Historic Places (NRHP) in 1975.

According to its NRHP nomination, it is "the oldest commercial building in the county" and "served as a post office, bank, furniture store, funeral parlor, drug store, hardware store, and grocery at various times during its long years of service."

== Steele County Museum ==
The building is now home to the Steele County Museum, operated by the Steele County Historical Society. The museum's collections include textiles, toy tractors, and a collection of artifacts from the Masons and Odd Fellows.
