= Charles W. Gillet =

American politician (1840–1908)

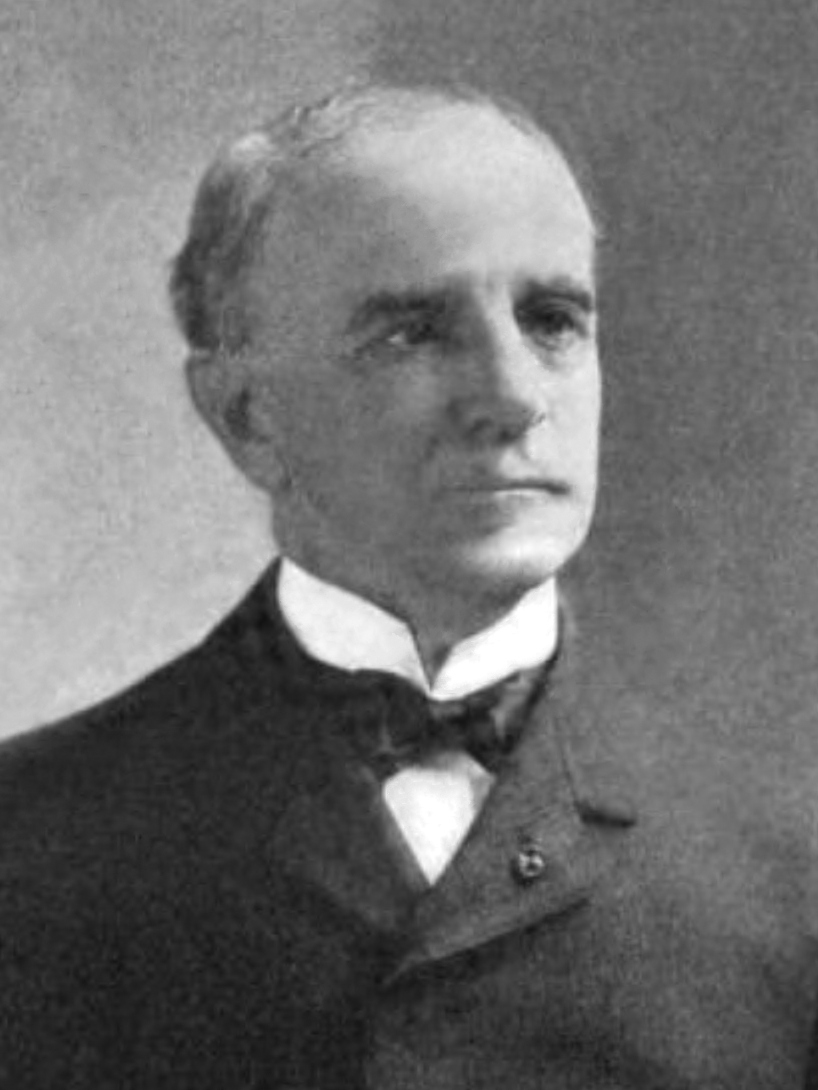

Member of the U.S. House of Representatives from New York
- In office March 4, 1893 – March 3, 1905
- Preceded by: John Raines
- Succeeded by: Jacob Sloat Fassett
- Constituency: 29th district (1893–1903); 33rd district (1903–1905)

Personal details
- Born: November 26, 1840 Addison, New York, U.S.
- Died: December 31, 1908 (aged 78) New York City, New York, U.S.
- Resting place: Rural Cemetery
- Party: Republican

Charles William Gillet (November 26, 1840 – December 31, 1908) was a U.S. representative from New York.

== Biography ==
He was born in Addison, New York on November 26, 1840. Gillet attended the public schools and the Delaware Literary Institute, Franklin, New York. He was graduated from Union College, Schenectady, New York, in 1861. Enlisted as a private in the Eighty-sixth Regiment, New York Volunteer Infantry, in August 1861. He was promoted to adjutant of the regiment in November 1861. He was wounded and honorably discharged for physical disability in 1863. He engaged in the manufacture of sash, doors, and blinds in Addison. He was appointed postmaster of Addison on June 15, 1878, and served until July 26, 1886.

Gillet was elected as a Republican to the Fifty-third and to the five succeeding Congresses (March 4, 1893 – March 3, 1905). He served as chairman of the Committee on Expenditures in the Department of Agriculture (Fifty-fourth through Fifty-seventh Congresses), Committee on Public Buildings and Grounds (Fifty-eighth Congress). He declined to be a candidate for renomination in 1904. He died in New York City December 31, 1908. He was interred in the Rural Cemetery, Addison, New York.

U.S. House of Representatives
| Preceded by John Raines | Member of the U.S. House of Representatives from New York's 29th congressional district 1893–1903 | Succeeded by Michael E. Driscoll |
| Preceded by De Alva S. Alexander | Member of the U.S. House of Representatives from New York's 33rd congressional district 1903–1905 | Succeeded by J. Sloat Fassett |
