= 1902 New York state election =

1902 New York gubernatorial election
- November 4, 1902
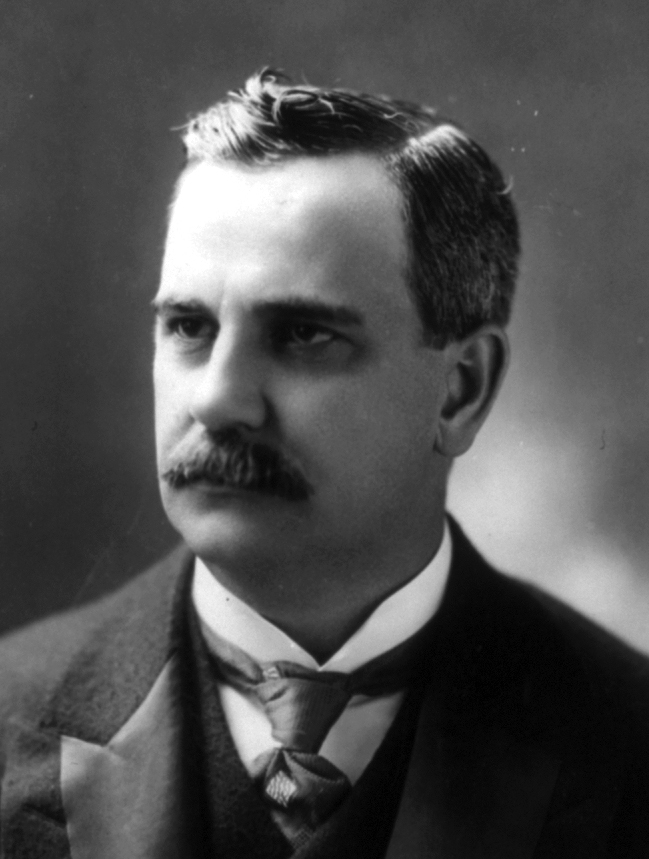

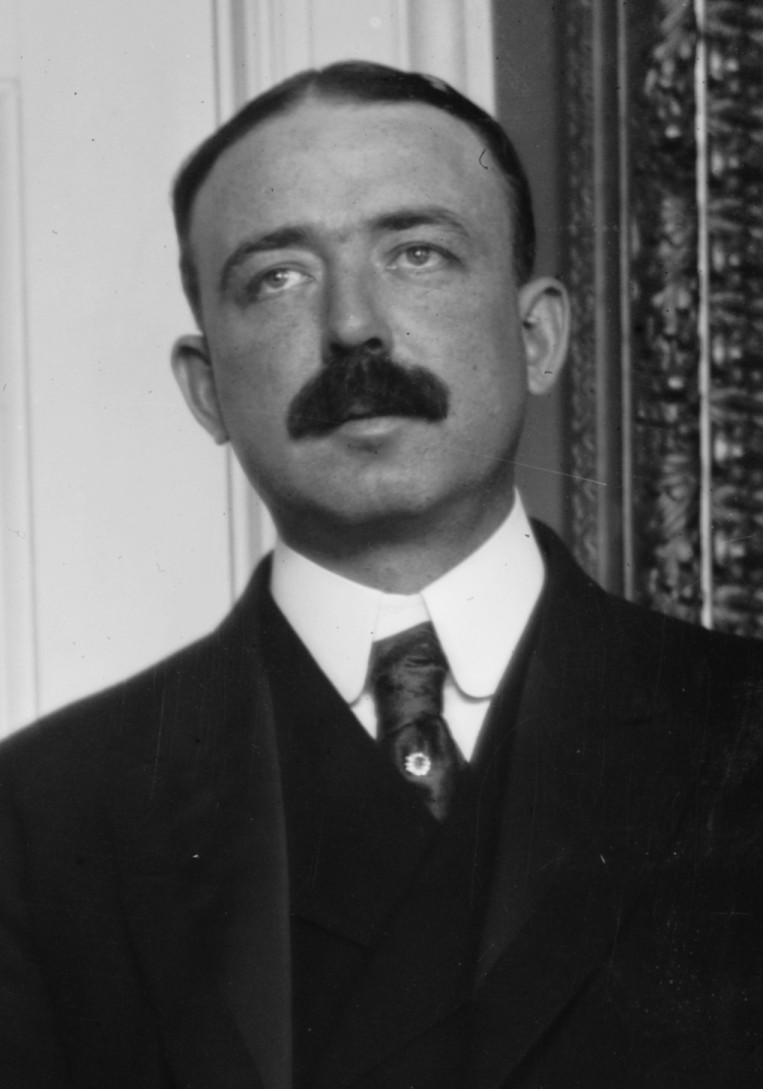
Nominee	Benjamin B. Odell Jr.	Bird Sim Coler
Party	Republican	Democratic
Popular vote	665,150	656,347
Percentage	48.09%	47.45%
- County results Odell: 40–50% 50–60% 60–70% 70–80% Coler: 50–60% 60–70%
Governor before election
Benjamin B. Odell Jr.
Republican
Elected Governor
Benjamin B. Odell Jr.
Republican

The 1902 New York state election was held on November 4, 1902, to elect the governor, the lieutenant governor, the Secretary of State, the state comptroller, the attorney general, the state treasurer, the state engineer and a judge of the New York Court of Appeals, as well as all members of the New York State Assembly and the New York State Senate.

== History ==
The "Liberal Democratic" state convention met at Cooper Union in Manhattan. This party was composed of Bryan Democrats, Chicago Platform Democrats and former Populists which were fiercely opposed to Democratic boss David B. Hill. Judge Samuel Seabury was Permanent Chairman. They nominated Edgar L. Ryder for Governor; J. C. Corbin, of St. Lawrence County, for Lieutenant Governor; John B. Howarth, of Buffalo, for Secretary of State; De Myre S. Fero for Comptroller; Daniel B. Casley, of Westchester County, for Treasurer; Dennis Spellissey, of New York City, for Attorney General; John E. Dugan, of Albany County, for State Engineer; and Robert Stewart, of Brooklyn, for the Court of Appeals.

The Social Democratic state convention met on July 4 at 64, East Fourth Street in Manhattan. They nominated Benjamin Hanford for Governor; William Thurston Brown, of Rochester, for Lieutenant Governor; Leonard D. Abbott for Secretary of State; Gen. Lawrence Mayes, of New York City, for Attorney General; Warren Atkinson, of Brooklyn, for Comptroller; Joel Moses, of Rochester, for Treasurer; Everitt Holmes, of Peekskill, for State Engineer; and John F. Clarke, of New York City, for the Court of Appeals.

The Socialist Labor state convention met on August 30 at Utica, New York.

The Prohibition state convention met on September 5 at Saratoga Springs, New York. Alfred L. Manierre, of New York City, was Temporary Chairman until the choice of Alphonso A. Hopkins as Permanent Chairman. They nominated Manierre for Governor; Alfred A. Hartman, of Albion, for Lieutenant Governor; Alden W. Young, of Oswego, for Secretary of State; Samuel Mitchell, of Hornellsville, for Treasurer; James McNeil, of Hudson, for Comptroller; Emmett F. Smith for State Engineer; Erwin J. Baldwin, of Elmira, for the Court of Appeals; and endorsed Democrat John Cunneen for Attorney General.

The Republican state convention met on September 23 and 24 at Saratoga Springs. Timothy E. Ellsworth was Permanent Chairman. Governor Benjamin B. Odell, Jr., was re-nominated after a roll call in which all votes were cast for him. All other state officers were nominated by acclamation.

The Democratic state convention met on September 30 and October 1 at Saratoga Springs. Martin W. Littleton was Permanent Chairman.

== Result ==
Six Republicans and two Democrats were elected in a tight race.

The incumbents Odell, Miller, Bond and Gray were re-elected.

28 Republicans and 22 Democrats were elected to a two-year term (1903–04) in the New York State Senate.

89 Republicans and 61 Democrats were elected for the session of 1903 to the New York State Assembly.

The Republican, Democratic, Social Democratic, Prohibition and Socialist Labor parties maintained automatic ballot status (necessary 10,000 votes for Governor).

1902 state election results
Office	Republican ticket		Democratic ticket		Social Democratic ticket		Prohibition ticket		Socialist Labor ticket		Liberal Democratic ticket	
Governor	Benjamin B. Odell Jr.	665,150	Bird S. Coler	656,347	Benjamin Hanford	23,400	Alfred L. Manierre	20,490	Daniel De Leon	15,886	Edgar L. Ryder	1,894
Lieutenant Governor	Frank W. Higgins	663,689	Charles N. Bulger	653,555	William Thurston Brown	23,652	John A. Hartman	21,358	Norman S. Burnham	16,233	J. C. Corbin	1,901
Secretary of State	John F. O'Brien	663,590	Frank H. Mott	650,731	Leonard D. Abbott	23,766	Alden W. Young	21,584	Boris Reinstein	16,394	John B. Howarth	1,969
Comptroller	Nathan L. Miller	664,412	Charles M. Preston	651,373	Warren Atkinson	24,759	James McNeil	21,310	Peter Jacobson	16,355	Daniel B. Casley	1,937
Attorney General	Henry B. Coman	662,463	John Cunneen	650,700	Lawrence Mayes	23,832	John Cunneen	21,292	John E. Wallace	16,473	Dennis Spellissey	1,916
Treasurer	John G. Wickser	663,490	George R. Finch	651,949	Joel Moses	23,841	Samuel Mitchell	21,442	Charles A. Ruby	16,432	De Myre S. Fero	1,899
State Engineer	Edward A. Bond	663,674	Richard W. Sherman	651,677	Everitt Holmes	23,832	Emmett F. Smith	21,929	John M. Grady	16,473	Flinn	1,926
Judge of the Court of Appeals	William E. Werner	650,505	John Clinton Gray	665,326	John F. Clarke	23,617	Erwin J. Baldwin	21,191	Anton Metzler	16,363	Robert Stewart	1,842

Obs.: "Blank and scattering" votes: 8,901 (Judge), 8,737 (Attorney), 6,632 (Governor)

== See also ==
- New York gubernatorial elections

== Sources ==
- The tickets: Elections in Forty-Two States Nov. 4 in NYT on October 19, 1902
- Result: THE VOTE IN NOVEMBER in NYT on December 10, 1902
- Result: STATE CANVASSERS MEET TO-DAY in NYT on December 12, 1902 [the numbers differ slightly from the ones published two days earlier]
- Result: The Tribune Almanac 1903
- The New York Red Book 1903
