= Blabon, North Dakota =

Unincorporated community in North Dakota, US

Blabon
- Unincorporated community
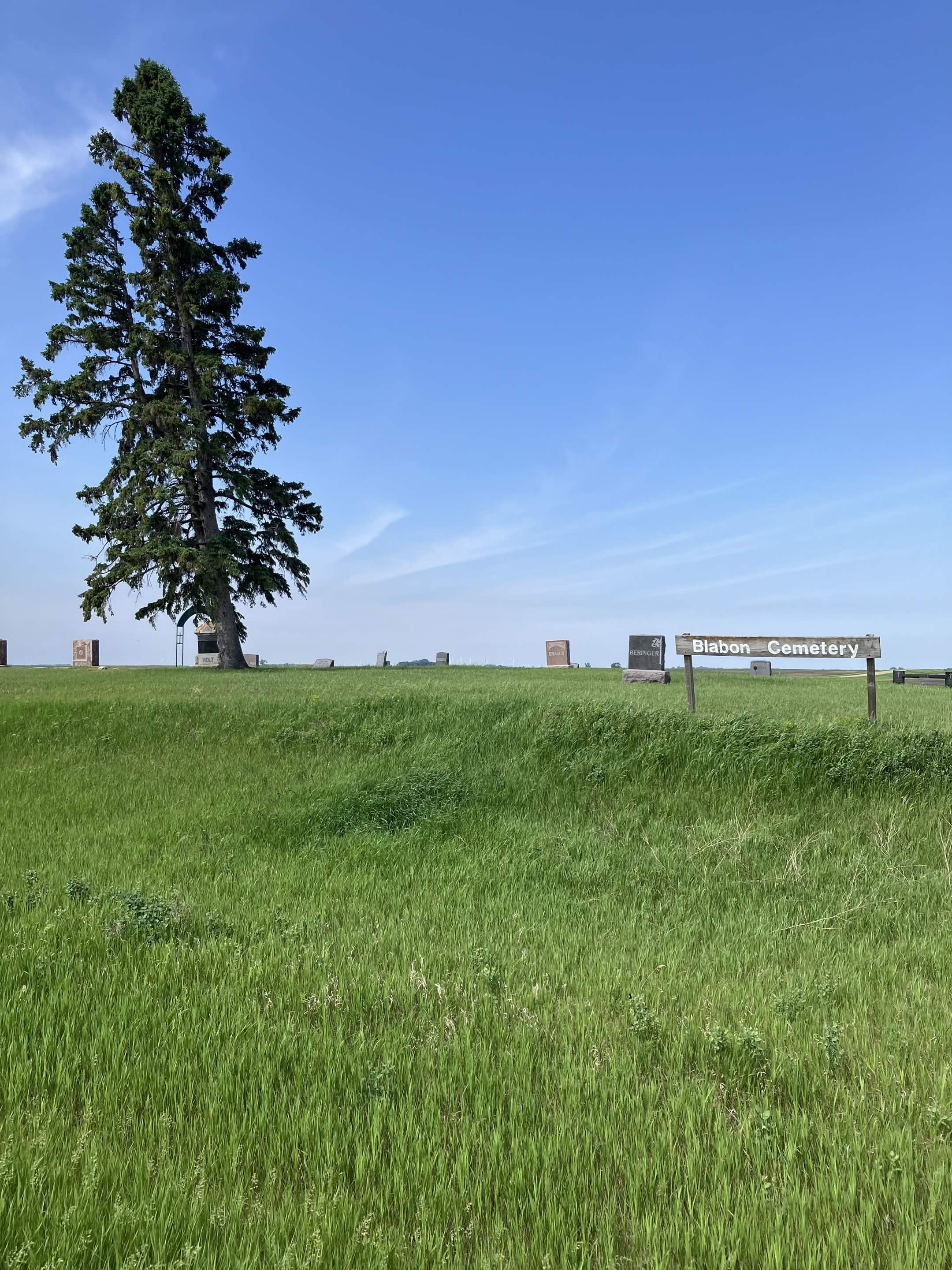
- Cemetery in Blabon

- Location within North Dakota
- Coordinates: 47°24′13″N 97°47′20″W
- Country: United States
- State: North Dakota
- County: Steele County
- Elevation: 1,355 ft (413 m)
- GNIS feature ID: 1028423

Blabon is an unincorporated community in Steele County, North Dakota, United States.

== Founding ==
The community was founded in 1896, named after Joseph Ward Blabon, an official for the Great Northern Railway, who visited the site in 1897. A post office was established in 1900 and remained in operation until 1957. As of 2023, the town is uninhabited.
