= Delaware Literary Institute =

Former secondary school in Franklin, New York, US (1835–1902)

Coordinates: 42°20′21″N 75°10′4.5″W

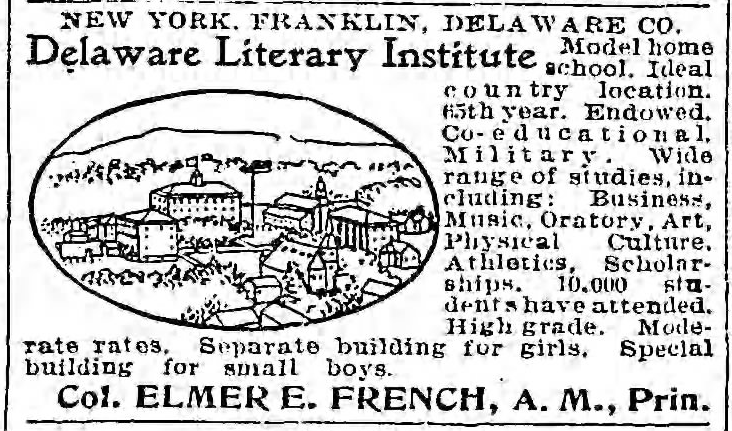
- 1899 advertisement in The Brooklyn Eagle

Location
- Franklin, New York; United States

Information
- Established: 1835
- Closed: 1902
- Principal: Col. Elmer E. French
- Gender: Co-educational
- Enrollment: 83 (1836); 409 (1852); 225 (1870s)

The Delaware Literary Institute was a secondary school located at Franklin, New York. In the mid-19th century it was one of the most prominent educational institutions in New York State. It operated from 1835 to 1902.

== History ==
The Delaware Literary Institute was chartered in 1835 as a "literary institution for the instruction and education of youth of both sexes," with a primary aim of educating ministers and missionary teachers. The first building opened in 1836 (Old Stone Hall) and enrollment was 45 male and 38 female students. In 1852, the student body stood at 409. In 1852, a large three story structure known as Ladies Boarding Hall was constructed. In 1855–1856, Chapel Hall was built and the New Stone Hall constructed to replace the Old Stone Hall that was destroyed by fire.

Enrollment declined after the American Civil War and remained at about 225 through the next 30 years. Enrollment dropped in the 1890s due to competition from public schools. In 1902, Delaware Literary Institute succumbed to public and financial pressures and leased its buildings for use as a Union Free School. Chapel Hall and the New Stone Hall are the only remaining structures. Chapel Hall is used by the Franklin Stage Company, a professional theater founded in 1996, operating on an Actors Equity Association Small Professional Theater Tier IV contract.

== Prominent graduates ==
- Arthur C. Butts
- Charles M. Preston
- Charles W. Gillet
- Samuel F. Miller (US politician)
- Charles J. Knapp
- Ferris Jacobs, Jr.
- William H. Steele
- Washington Irving Warrey
- N. B. Willey
