= Hope-Page Public Schools =

School district in North Dakota, United States

Hope-Page Public School District 85 is a school district headquartered in Page, North Dakota, serving Hope and Page. It operates Hope-Page Elementary School in Page and Hope-Page High School in Hope.

== History ==
In 1910 the board of education aimed to spend $5,000 in a tax levy.

In 1964 students from Colgate began attending school in Hope and Page after the Colgate school closed.

Beginning circa 1987 the Hope and Page school districts made cooperative sports teams. Beginning circa 1999 the two districts began doing a "trial merger" where on a temporary basis students from the respective districts attended each others' schools. In 2005 Hope officials signaled a willingness to permanently consolidate while Page officials had hesitancy since the Hope district hoped to have an athletic partnership in girls' basketball with Finley-Sharon School District, something that the Page district was not in favor of as the market for girls' basketball players would be crowded. That year a board member of the Hope district, Trevor Jacobsen, stated to the Page officials "We've been dating for 18 years. It's time we get married."

The Hope and Page school districts formally consolidated in the 2020-2021 school year.

== Area ==
In Cass County the district serves, in addition to Page, a section of Erie. In Steele County the district serves Hope and Luverne. In Barnes County the district serves Pillsbury. It also serves Griggs County.
