= John Duval Gluck =

American philanthropist, real estate broker and artist

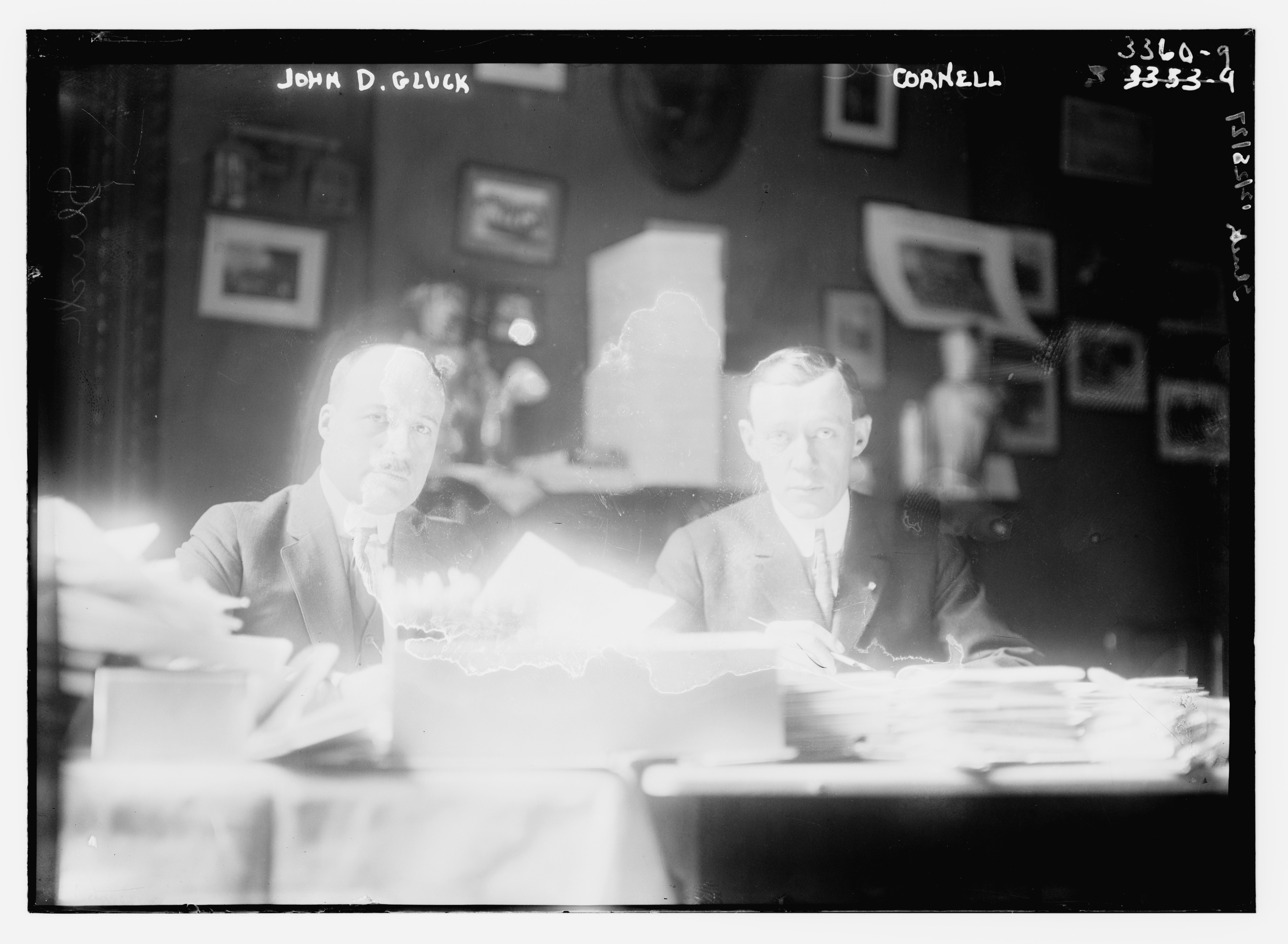
John D. Gluck (left) c. 1914

John Duval Gluck Jr. (December 25, 1878 – 1951) was an American philanthropist, customs broker, and con artist who is best known for popularizing the practice of sending and answering letters to Santa Claus in New York City. Gluck's organization, the Santa Claus Association, would receive letters addressed to Santa Claus from impoverished children, investigate them to ensure that they were truly needy, and if approved would send gifts to those children.

== Early life ==
Gluck, the oldest of five brothers, was born in Bedford-Stuyvesant, Brooklyn, New York and raised in Westfield, New Jersey. Gluck, who was born on Christmas Day, descended from a line of Santa Claus players, including his grandfather, Johan Baptiste von Gluck who played Santa Claus in Baltimore, Maryland.

He inherited his father's customs brokerage business but left the business at age 35.

== The Santa Claus Association ==
In 1911, the United States Postal Service made a policy change to no longer destroy letters addressed to Santa Claus, but instead give them to local charity groups. There were no charity groups willing to participate in this program in New York City, which led to the Santa Claus Association being founded in December 1913. Gluck proposed the Santa Claus Association to Edward M. Morgan, then Postmaster of New York City, laying out plans for a not-for-profit organization to receive, verify, and respond to Christmas letters sent by needy children in New York. Gluck, who was born on Christmas Day, was seen as a natural choice to run the program.

The Santa Claus Association served as a middleman between donors and children. Volunteers devoted their time reading and organizing letters while donors, often wealthy businesspersons or other members of the social elite, funded the gift-giving operations. Gluck himself served as president of the association, and he named John J. Kiely as the honorary vice-president.

The organization quickly grew large, receiving thousands of dollars in donations to pay for supplies, postage, and gifts for needy children. It also collaborated extensively with major politicians like New York Governor Al Smith and United States President Warren Harding as well as celebrities like Mary Pickford and Douglas Fairbanks.

As funds poured in, Gluck's ambitions grew. In 1915, three years after the Association started operating, Gluck announced a plan to build a massive structure called the Santa Claus Building on a 100-foot-wide plot in the middle of New York City. Though Gluck aggressively fundraised to raise the $300,000 needed to build the project, and even commissioned famous architects George and Edward Blum to design the building, no work was ever done.

=== Downfall ===
The Santa Claus Association became embroiled in controversy as a result of dubious fundraising and accounting practices. Bird S. Coler, then the commissioner for public welfare in New York City, investigated the organization in 1927. Coler uncovered tens of thousands of dollars in unaccounted-for funds as well as a lack of institutional oversight over Gluck's use of donors' funds. Coler's audit revealed that almost all of the money raised for the Santa Claus Building had been embezzled by Gluck himself, who had also embezzled most of the funds raised to purchase gifts and pay for postage. The United States Post Office ended its involvement with the Santa Claus Association and eventually developed its own letter-answering service under the auspices of Operation Santa Claus.

== Later life and death ==
Gluck was never charged with a crime for his activities with the Santa Claus Association. After the collapse of the Association, he and his wife moved to Miami, Florida where he became a real estate agent. He remained there until 1951, where he died at the age of 73.
