= Sherbrooke, North Dakota =

- Ghost town
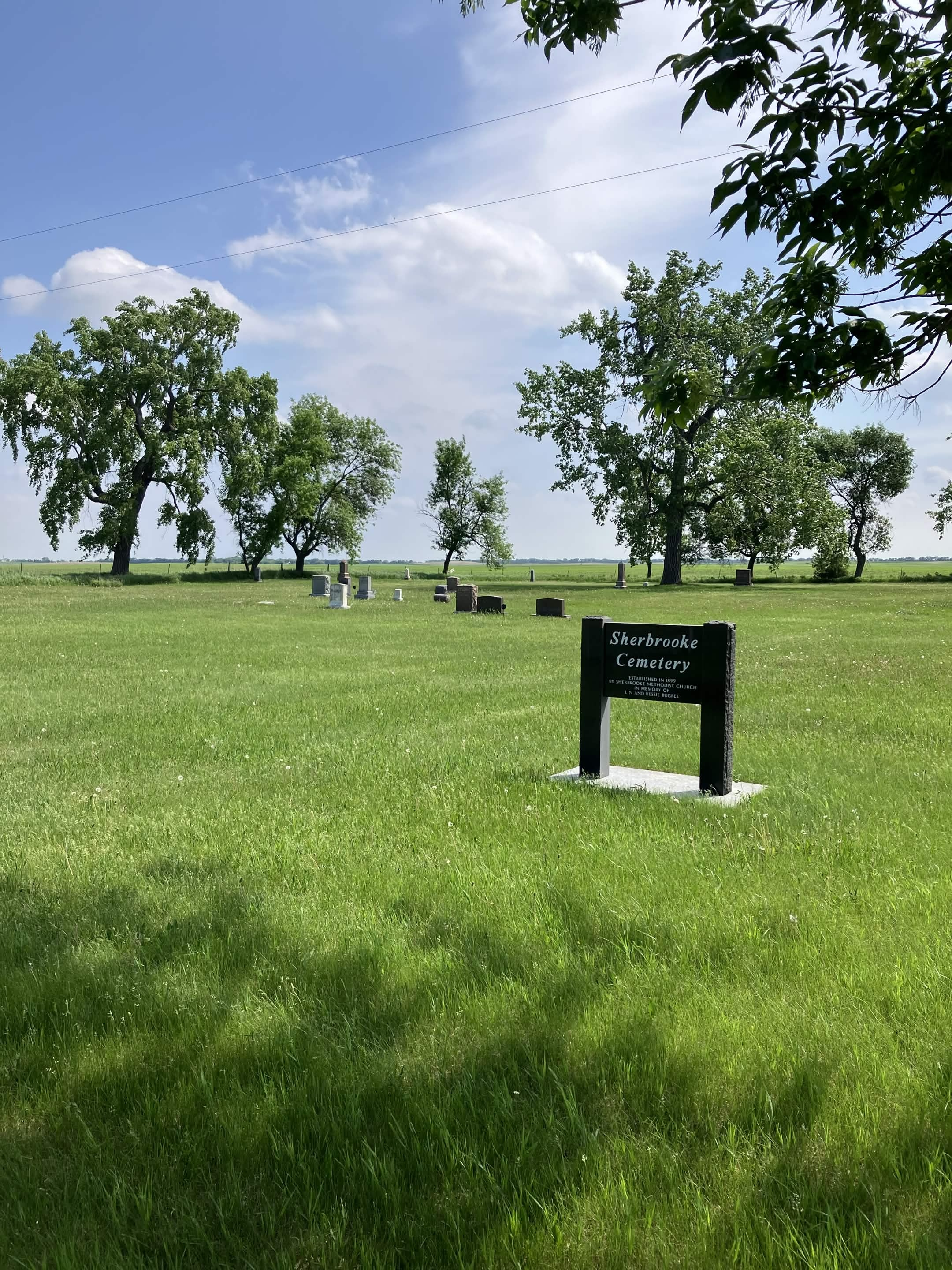
- Cemetery in Sherbrooke

- Location within the state of North Dakota Sherbrooke, North Dakota (the United States)
- Coordinates: 47°27′39″N 97°43′10″W
- Country: United States
- State: North Dakota
- County: Steele
- Township: Sherbrooke
- Founded: 1884
- Named after: Sherbrooke, Quebec
- Elevation: 1,250 ft (380 m)
- Time zone: UTC-6 (Central (CST))
  - Summer (DST): UTC-5 (CDT)
- Area code: 701
- FIPS code: 38-72425
- GNIS feature ID: 1032050

Sherbrooke is a ghost town in Steele County in the U.S. state of North Dakota. It was the county seat from 1885 to 1919, when the government moved to the current county seat of Finley. It is located in Sherbrooke Township.

== History ==
Sherbrooke was named after the city of Sherbrooke, Quebec, Canada, which itself was named after Sir John Coape Sherbrooke (1764 – 1830), Governor General of Canada from 1816 to 1818.

The Sherbrooke House Hotel was a prominent fixture in the community. The hotel was purchased in 1893 by Washington Irving Warrey, who served as Steele County judge from 1894 to 1905. Hotel records indicate President William McKinley stayed at the hotel in 1896 during a trip to North Dakota.

On June 28, 1918, county residents voted to move the county seat from Sherbrooke to "some other and more convenient place", since Sherbrooke did not lie along the railroad or an interstate river. Finley, North Dakota, received the most votes. Residents of Sherbrooke petitioned the North Dakota Supreme Court for an injunction to stop the relocation. The Supreme Court denied the petition, and the county seat was moved in 1919.
