= Steele County, North Dakota =

County in North Dakota, United States

- County
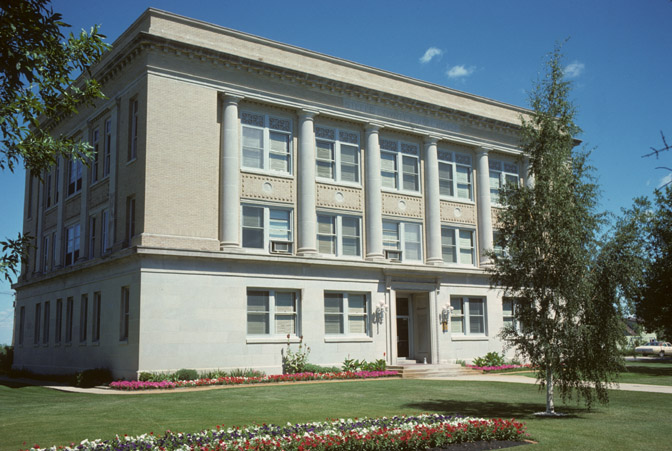
- The Steele County Courthouse in Finley

- Location within the U.S. state of North Dakota
- Coordinates: 47.451062°N 97.71892°W
- Country: United States
- State: North Dakota
- Founded: June 2, 1883 (created); July 13, 1883 (organized)
- Named for: Edward H. Steele
- Seat: Finley
- Largest city: Finley

Area
  - Total: 715.400 sq mi (1,852.88 km^{2})
  - Land: 712.143 sq mi (1,844.44 km^{2})
  - Water: 3.257 sq mi (8.44 km^{2}) 0.46%

Population (2020)
  - Total: 1,798
  - Estimate (2025): 1,797 ▼
  - Density: 2.481/sq mi (0.958/km^{2})
- Time zone: UTC−6 (Central)
  - Summer (DST): UTC−5 (CDT)
- Area code: 701
- Congressional district: At-large
- Website: steelecountynd.gov

Steele County is a county in the U.S. state of North Dakota. As of the 2020 census, the population was 1,798, and was estimated to be 1,797 in 2025, making it the fourth-least populous county in North Dakota. The county seat and the largest city is Finley.

== History ==
The Dakota Territory legislature created the county on June 2, 1883, with territories partitioned from Griggs and Traill counties. It was not organized at that time but was attached to Traill for administrative and judicial purposes. It was named for businessman Edward H. Steele, who had pushed for its creation.

On June 13, 1883, the county organization was affected and Steele County was detached from Traill County; Sherbrooke, North Dakota was chosen as the county seat. In 1897 the town of Finley was founded, and by 1919 its growth had eclipsed Sherbrooke to the point that the county seat was transferred to Finley. The county's boundaries have been unchanged since its creation.

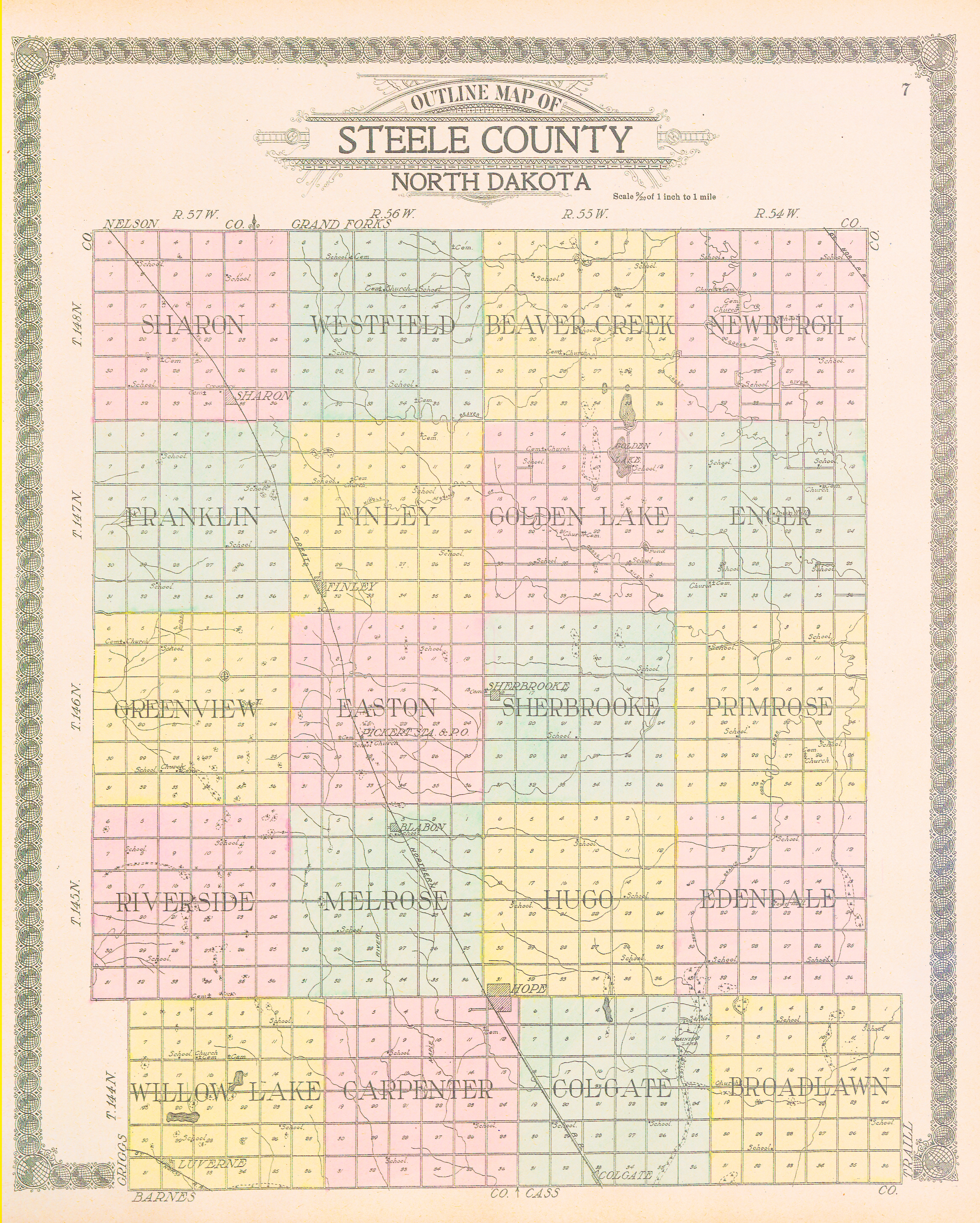
Outline map of Steele County, North Dakota, 1911

== Geography ==
The Sheyenne River flows south near and into the county's west boundary line. The Goose River flows southeast through the northeastern part of the county. The terrain consists of rolling hills dotted with lakes and ponds. The area is devoted to agriculture. The terrain slopes to the south and east; its highest point is near its northwestern corner, at 1,562 ft (476 m) ASL.

According to the United States Census Bureau, the county has a total area of 715.400 square miles (1,852.88 km^{2}), of which 712.143 square miles (1,844.44 km^{2}) is land and 3.257 square miles (8.44 km^{2}) (0.46%) is water. It is the 50th largest county in North Dakota by total area.

=== Major highways ===
- North Dakota Highway 32
- North Dakota Highway 38
- North Dakota Highway 200

=== Adjacent counties ===
- Grand Forks County - north
- Traill County - east
- Cass County - southeast
- Barnes County - southwest
- Griggs County - west
- Nelson County - northwest

=== Lakes ===
- Golden Lake
- Golden Rush Lake
- Lake Tobiason
- Lone Tree Lake
- North Golden Lake
- Stony Lake
- Willow Lake

== Demographics ==
Historical population
Census	Pop.	Note	%±
1890	3,777		—
1900	5,888		55.9%
1910	7,616		29.3%
1920	7,401		−2.8%
1930	6,972		−5.8%
1940	6,193		−11.2%
1950	5,145		−16.9%
1960	4,719		−8.3%
1970	3,749		−20.6%
1980	3,106		−17.2%
1990	2,420		−22.1%
2000	2,258		−6.7%
2010	1,975		−12.5%
2020	1,798		−9.0%
2025 (est.)	1,797	▼	−0.1%
U.S. Decennial Census; 1790–1960 1900–1990; 1990–2000 2010–2020

=== Recent estimates ===
As of the fourth quarter of 2024, the median home value in Steele County was $127,570.

As of the 2023 American Community Survey, there are 731 estimated households in Steele County with an average of 2.37 persons per household. The county has a median household income of $80,313. Approximately 13.3% of the county's population lives at or below the poverty line. Steele County has an estimated 59.7% employment rate, with 29.6% of the population holding a bachelor's degree or higher and 94.5% holding a high school diploma.

The top five reported ancestries (people were allowed to report up to two ancestries, thus the figures will generally add to more than 100%) were English (98.6%), Spanish (0.0%), Indo-European (1.4%), Asian and Pacific Islander (0.0%), and Other (0.1%).

Steele County, North Dakota – racial and ethnic composition
Note: the US Census treats Hispanic/Latino as an ethnic category. This table excludes Latinos from the racial categories and assigns them to a separate category. Hispanics/Latinos may be of any race.

Race / ethnicity (NH = non-Hispanic)	Pop. 1980	Pop. 1990	Pop. 2000	Pop. 2010	Pop. 2020
White alone (NH)	3,094 (99.61%)	2,411 (99.63%)	2,220 (98.32%)	1,916 (97.01%)	1,721 (95.72%)
Black or African American alone (NH)	2 (0.06%)	0 (0.00%)	1 (0.04%)	3 (0.15%)	3 (0.17%)
Native American or Alaska Native alone (NH)	1 (0.03%)	2 (0.08%)	14 (0.62%)	23 (1.16%)	7 (0.39%)
Asian alone (NH)	6 (0.19%)	2 (0.08%)	1 (0.04%)	2 (0.10%)	0 (0.00%)
Pacific Islander alone (NH)	—	—	0 (0.00%)	0 (0.00%)	0 (0.00%)
Other race alone (NH)	0 (0.00%)	0 (0.00%)	1 (0.04%)	1 (0.05%)	0 (0.00%)
Mixed race or multiracial (NH)	—	—	17 (0.75%)	10 (0.51%)	31 (1.72%)
Hispanic or Latino (any race)	3 (0.10%)	5 (0.21%)	4 (0.18%)	20 (1.01%)	36 (2.00%)
Total	3,106 (100.00%)	2,420 (100.00%)	2,258 (100.00%)	1,975 (100.00%)	1,798 (100.00%)

=== 2020 census ===
As of the 2020 census, the county had a population of 1,798, 788 households, and 515 families residing in the county. Of the residents, 21.7% were under the age of 18 and 24.4% were 65 years of age or older; the median age was 48.4 years. For every 100 females there were 114.3 males, and for every 100 females age 18 and over there were 117.1 males.

There were 788 households, of which 27.0% had children under the age of 18 living with them and 14.0% had a female householder with no spouse or partner present. About 30.1% of all households were made up of individuals and 12.7% had someone living alone who was 65 years of age or older.

The population density was 2.52 inhabitants per square mile (1.0/km^{2}). There were 1,091 housing units at an average density of 1.53 per square mile (0.6/km^{2}). Of those units, 27.8% were vacant. Among occupied housing units, 81.9% were owner-occupied and 18.1% were renter-occupied. The homeowner vacancy rate was 2.0% and the rental vacancy rate was 15.6%.

The racial makeup of the county was 96.3% White, 0.2% Black or African American, 0.4% American Indian and Alaska Native, 0.0% Asian, 0.22% Pacific Islander, 0.3% from some other race, and 2.6% from two or more races. Hispanic or Latino residents of any race comprised 2.0% of the population.

=== 2010 census ===
As of the 2010 census, there were 1,975 people, 864 households, and 589 families residing in the county. The population density was 2.8 inhabitants per square mile (1.1/km^{2}). There were 1,171 housing units at an average density of 1.6 per square mile (0.6/km^{2}). The racial makeup of the county was 97.57% White, 0.15% African American, 1.16% Native American, 0.10% Asian, 0.00% Pacific Islander, 0.41% from some other races and 0.61% from two or more races. Hispanic or Latino people of any race were 1.01% of the population.

In terms of ancestry, 60.0% were Norwegian, 35.2% were German, 5.4% were Irish, and 1.0% were American.

There were 864 households, 24.7% had children under the age of 18 living with them, 59.4% were married couples living together, 4.5% had a female householder with no husband present, 31.8% were non-families, and 27.8% of all households were made up of individuals. The average household size was 2.29 and the average family size was 2.78. The median age was 47.7 years.

The median income for a household in the county was $44,191 and the median income for a family was $54,625. Males had a median income of $36,588 versus $25,648 for females. The per capita income for the county was $27,728. About 4.3% of families and 4.2% of the population were below the poverty line, including 7.1% of those under age 18 and 5.1% of those age 65 or over.

== Communities ==
=== Cities ===
- Finley (county seat)
- Hope
- Luverne
- Sharon

=== Unincorporated communities ===
- Blabon
- Colgate
- Pickert
- Sherbrooke (original county seat; now mostly uninhabited)

=== Townships ===
- Beaver Creek
- Broadlawn
- Carpenter
- Colgate
- Easton
- Edendale
- Enger
- Finley
- Franklin
- Golden Lake
- Greenview
- Hugo
- Melrose
- Newburgh
- Primrose
- Riverside
- Sharon
- Sherbrooke
- Westfield
- Willow Lake

Township Numbers and Range Numbers
	Range 57	Range 56	Range 55	Range 54
Township 148	Sharon	Westfield	Beaver Creek	Newburgh
Township 147	Franklin	Finley	Golden Lake	Enger
Township 146	Greenview	Easton	Sherbrooke	Primrose
Township 145	Riverside	Melrose	Hugo	Edendale
Township 144	Willow Lake	Carpenter	Colgate	Broadlawn

== Politics ==
Steele County was a Democratic-leaning swing county in presidential elections until 2016, when Hillary Clinton lost to Donald Trump by nearly 20 points, an almost total flip from Barack Obama's 20 point win in 2008. In 2020, Joe Biden fared even worse despite a national increase for the Democratic Party from 2016. He was the first Democrat to win without the county since John F. Kennedy in 1960, and had the lowest proportion of the county's vote of any winning Democrat since Woodrow Wilson in 1912. Since 1964 Steele County has favored the Democratic presidential candidate in 64% of elections.

United States presidential election results for Steele County, North Dakota
Year	Republican		Democratic		Third party(ies)	
Year	No.	%	No.	%	No.	%
1900	724	74.41%	214	21.99%	35	3.60%
1904	817	86.82%	69	7.33%	55	5.84%
1908	881	68.72%	366	28.55%	35	2.73%
1912	237	23.58%	253	25.17%	515	51.24%
1916	676	53.31%	515	40.62%	77	6.07%
1920	2,222	85.17%	337	12.92%	50	1.92%
1924	1,247	52.77%	85	3.60%	1,031	43.63%
1928	1,574	57.34%	1,152	41.97%	19	0.69%
1932	695	25.88%	1,925	71.69%	65	2.42%
1936	724	25.20%	1,444	50.26%	705	24.54%
1940	1,328	47.70%	1,434	51.51%	22	0.79%
1944	1,042	43.89%	1,320	55.60%	12	0.51%
1948	1,052	45.00%	1,163	49.74%	123	5.26%
1952	1,513	62.16%	911	37.43%	10	0.41%
1956	1,188	50.83%	1,148	49.12%	1	0.04%
1960	1,209	50.76%	1,173	49.24%	0	0.00%
1964	796	36.13%	1,404	63.73%	3	0.14%
1968	952	46.87%	991	48.79%	88	4.33%
1972	1,063	53.96%	892	45.28%	15	0.76%
1976	835	43.35%	1,066	55.35%	25	1.30%
1980	997	53.32%	617	32.99%	256	13.69%
1984	941	54.08%	781	44.89%	18	1.03%
1988	690	43.26%	895	56.11%	10	0.63%
1992	503	36.72%	598	43.65%	269	19.64%
1996	486	39.67%	620	50.61%	119	9.71%
2000	655	54.13%	475	39.26%	80	6.61%
2004	586	48.31%	616	50.78%	11	0.91%
2008	404	39.15%	614	59.50%	14	1.36%
2012	498	47.79%	518	49.71%	26	2.50%
2016	538	53.85%	361	36.14%	100	10.01%
2020	652	59.93%	392	36.03%	44	4.04%
2024	622	61.28%	367	36.16%	26	2.56%

== Education ==
School districts include:

- Dakota Prairie Public School District 1
- Finley-Sharon Public School District 19
- Griggs County Central School District 18
- Hatton Public School District 7
- Hope-Page School District 85 (merger of Hope Public School District 10 and Page Public School District 80)
- May-Port CG Public School District 14
- Northwood Public School District 129

Former districts:

- Hope Public School District 10 - Consolidated with Page district in 2020
- Page Public School District 80 - Consolidated with Hope district in 2020

In 1964 the county had 992 students in four schools; at the time there were five school districts but Colgate was not operating any schools as its school closed in 1964.

== See also ==
- National Register of Historic Places listings in Steele County, North Dakota
