= Finley Township, Webster County, Missouri =

Township in Webster County, Missouri, U.S.

Coordinates: 37.1133°N 92.7731°W

Finley Township is an inactive township in Webster County, in the U.S. state of Missouri.

Finley Township was erected in 1855, taking its name from Finley Creek.
