= Bird Sim Coler =

American politician (1867–1941)

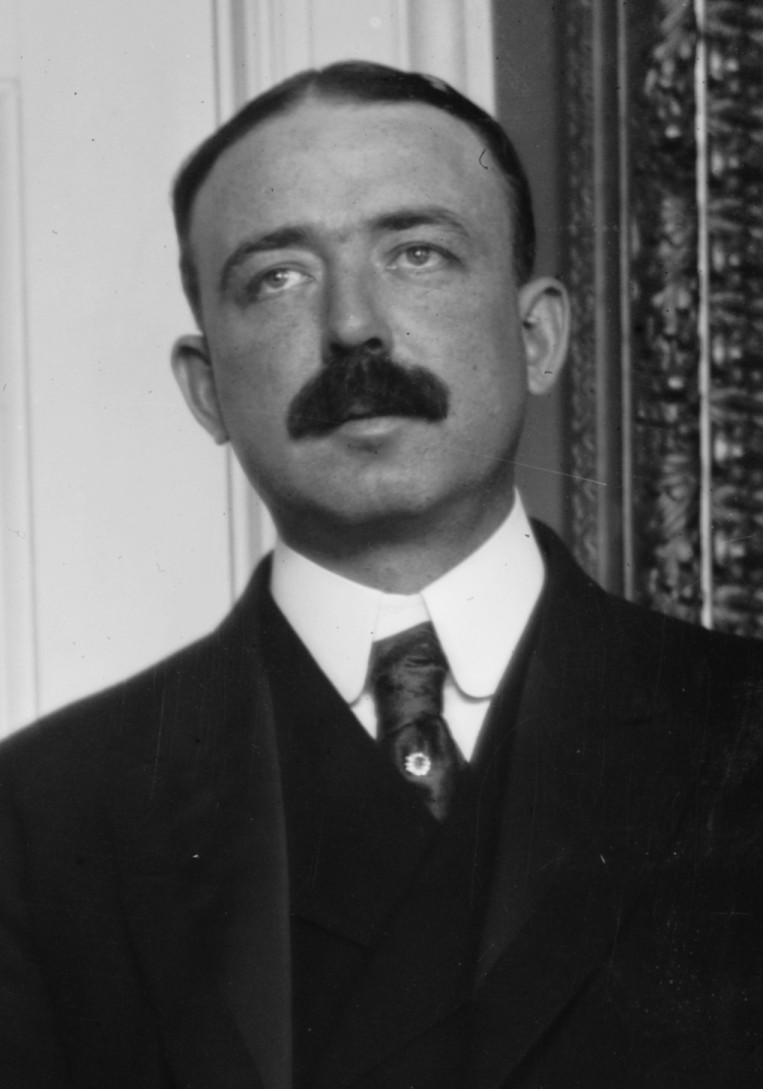
- Coler in 1908

23rd New York City Comptroller
- In office January 1, 1898 – December 31, 1901
- Preceded by: Ashbel P. Fitch (pre-consolidation)
- Succeeded by: Edward M. Grout

4th Borough President of Brooklyn
- In office January 1, 1906 – December 31, 1909
- Preceded by: Martin W. Littleton
- Succeeded by: Alfred E. Steers

Personal details
- Born: October 9, 1867 Urbana, Illinois, US
- Died: June 12, 1941 (aged 73) Brooklyn, New York, US
- Party: Democratic; Municipal Ownership League

Bird Sim Coler (October 9, 1867 Urbana, Illinois – June 12, 1941 Brooklyn, New York) was an American stockbroker and politician. He served as the first New York City Comptroller after the city's 1898 consolidation and was the Democratic nominee for Governor of New York in 1902. He narrowly lost the election to Governor Benjamin Odell Jr.

== Early and personal life ==
Coler was born on October 9, 1868, in Urbana, Illinois, the son of William N. Coler and Cordelia Sim. The elder Coler established a banking house after the Civil War and brought his family to Brooklyn. The younger Coler was educated at Brooklyn Polytechnic Institute.

Coler and Emily Moore, the daughter of Mr. and Mrs. Benjamin Moore, were married on October 1, 1888. He died on June 12, 1941, in Brooklyn, and she died on August 23, 1941, in the same hospital. They had a son, Eugene Bird Coler.

== Career ==
Coler established himself as a stockbroker in New York City, became prominent in municipal and State politics, and was first Comptroller of Greater New York, from 1897 to 1901. In 1902, he was the Democratic nominee for Governor of New York, but lost to Benjamin B. Odell Jr., by a small plurality in spite of his enormous lead in New York City.

In 1905, Coler was elected president of the Borough of Brooklyn, on the Municipal Ownership ticket. For his four-year term, Coler appointed Charles Frederic Adams, a Single-Tax advocate who had endorsed Coler's earlier run for governor, to be the Borough Secretary. In 1918, Coler ran unsuccessfully on the Democratic ticket for New York State Comptroller.

Coler was the author of Commercialism in Politics, Two and Two Make Four, He Made Them Twain, and other sociological works.

In 1927, Coler, then the commissioner for public welfare in New York City, investigated "The Santa Claus Association" of John Duval Gluck. The association became embroiled in controversy as a result of dubious fundraising and accounting practices.

== Legacy ==
Coler-Goldwater Specialty Hospital on Roosevelt Island bears his name.

Party political offices
Preceded by John B. Stanchfield	Democratic nominee for Governor of New York; 1902	Succeeded by D-Cady Herrick
Preceded by Joseph W. Masters	Democratic nominee for New York State Comptroller; 1918	Succeeded by Charles W. Berry
Political offices
Preceded by New office	New York City Comptroller; 1898–1901	Succeeded by Edward M. Grout
Political offices
Preceded by Martin W. Littleton	Borough President of Brooklyn; 1906–1909	Succeeded by Alfred E. Steers
