= Page, North Dakota =

- City
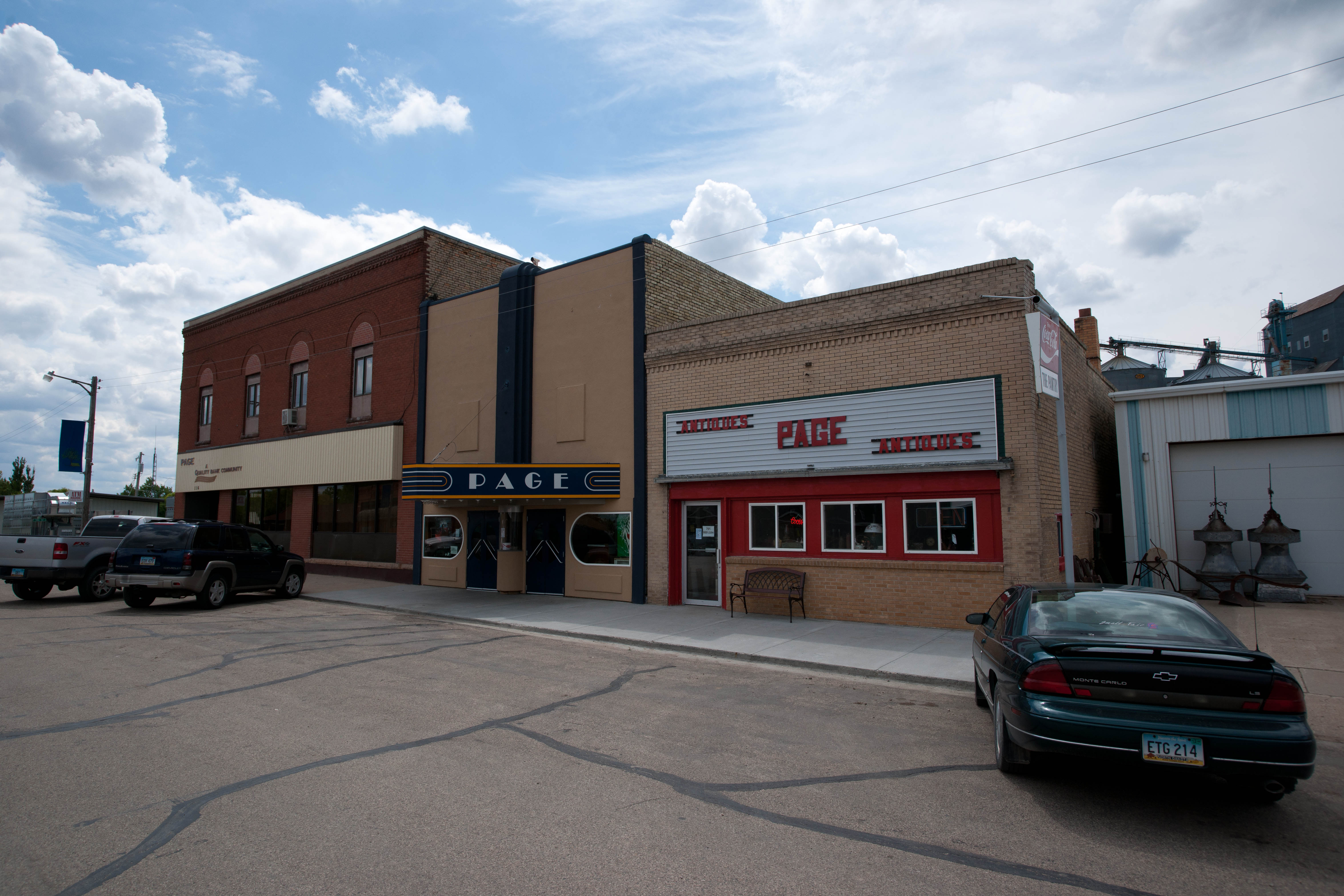
- Page Theatre and Page Antiques

- Location of Page, North Dakota
- Coordinates: 47°09′33″N 97°34′05″W
- Country: United States
- State: North Dakota
- County: Cass
- Founded: 1882

Government
  - Mayor: Jim Heidorn

Area
  - Total: 1.003 sq mi (2.599 km^{2})
  - Land: 1.003 sq mi (2.599 km^{2})
  - Water: 0 sq mi (0.000 km^{2})
- Elevation: 1,168 ft (356 m)

Population (2020)
  - Total: 190
  - Estimate (2023): 189
  - Density: 189.3/sq mi (73.09/km^{2})
- Time zone: UTC–6 (Central (CST))
  - Summer (DST): UTC–5 (CDT)
- ZIP Code: 58064
- Area code: 701
- FIPS code: 38-60500
- GNIS feature ID: 1036211
- Website: pagend.com

Page is a city in Cass County, North Dakota, United States. The population was 190 at the 2020 census. Page was founded in 1882.

== Geography ==
According to the United States Census Bureau, the city has a total area of 1.004 square miles (2.60 km^{2}), all land.

== Demographics ==
Historical population
Census	Pop.	Note	%±
1910	479		—
1920	452		−5.6%
1930	443		−2.0%
1940	428		−3.4%
1950	482		12.6%
1960	432		−10.4%
1970	367		−15.0%
1980	329		−10.4%
1990	266		−19.1%
2000	225		−15.4%
2010	232		3.1%
2020	190		−18.1%
2023 (est.)	189		−0.5%
U.S. Decennial Census; 2020 Census

=== 2010 census ===
As of the 2010 census, there were 232 people, 102 households, and 61 families living in the city. The population density was 1,288.9 inhabitants per square mile (497.6/km^{2}). There were 121 housing units at an average density of 672.2 per square mile (259.5/km^{2}). The racial makeup of the city was 98.7% White, 0.4% Asian, and 0.9% from two or more races. Hispanic or Latino of any race were 7.8% of the population.

There were 102 households, of which 32.4% had children under the age of 18 living with them, 50.0% were married couples living together, 4.9% had a female householder with no husband present, 4.9% had a male householder with no wife present, and 40.2% were non-families. 36.3% of all households were made up of individuals, and 19.6% had someone living alone who was 65 years of age or older. The average household size was 2.27 and the average family size was 3.02.

The median age in the city was 37.5 years. 28% of residents were under the age of 18; 5.2% were between the ages of 18 and 24; 22.5% were from 25 to 44; 26.3% were from 45 to 64; and 18.1% were 65 years of age or older. The gender makeup of the city was 47.4% male and 52.6% female.

=== 2000 census ===
As of the 2000 census, there were 225 people, 101 households, and 61 families living in the city. The population density was 1,259.1 inhabitants per square mile (486.1/km^{2}). There were 125 housing units at an average density of 699.5 per square mile (270.1/km^{2}). The racial makeup of the city was 99.11% White, 0.44% Native American, and 0.44% from two or more races. Hispanic or Latino of any race were 3.56% of the population.

There were 101 households, out of which 29.7% had children under the age of 18 living with them, 52.5% were married couples living together, 5.0% had a female householder with no husband present, and 39.6% were non-families. 34.7% of all households were made up of individuals, and 18.8% had someone living alone who was 65 years of age or older. The average household size was 2.23 and the average family size was 2.89.

In the city, the population was spread out, with 24.4% under the age of 18, 6.2% from 18 to 24, 20.9% from 25 to 44, 23.6% from 45 to 64, and 24.9% who were 65 years of age or older. The median age was 43 years. For every 100 females, there were 92.3 males. For every 100 females age 18 and over, there were 95.4 males.

The median income for a household in the city was $25,833, and the median income for a family was $37,143. Males had a median income of $27,500 versus $21,250 for females. The per capita income for the city was $16,692. About 1.8% of families and 13.0% of the population were below the poverty line, including 18.9% of those under the age of eighteen and 3.2% of those 65 or over.

== Government ==
The city is governed by a mayor and a four-member city council. The current mayor is Shane Larck. The current city council president is Justin Knott and the vice president is Jim Heidorn. Other council members are Matthew Erikson and Julie Bankers.

== Education ==
Page is part of the Hope-Page School District. Students attend elementary school (K-6) in Page while students attend middle school through high school (7–12) in the neighboring town of Hope.

== Notable people ==
- Louis B. Hanna, congressman, 11th governor of North Dakota
- Matthew Mechtel, Republican candidate for U.S. Representative in the 2006 general election, lost to Earl Pomeroy
- Cal Stoll, College Football Player and Coach
