= Finley, North Dakota =

- City
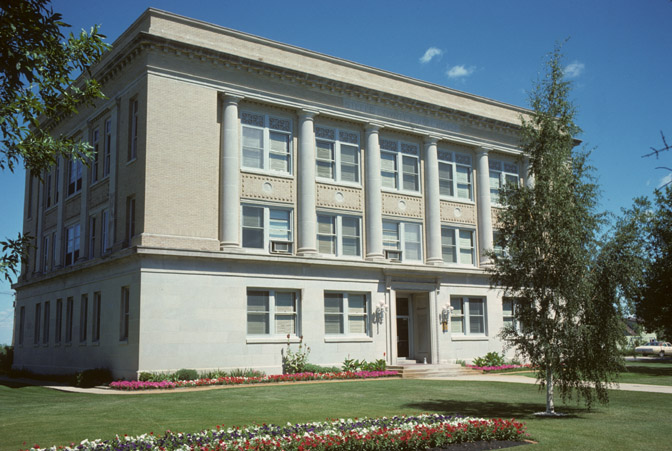
- The Steele County Courthouse in Finley

- Location of Finley, North Dakota
- Coordinates: 47.512515°N 97.837267°W
- Country: United States
- State: North Dakota
- County: Steele
- Founded: 1897

Area
  - Total: 3.487 sq mi (9.030 km^{2})
  - Land: 3.487 sq mi (9.030 km^{2})
  - Water: 0 sq mi (0.000 km^{2})
- Elevation: 1,457 ft (444 m)

Population (2020)
  - Total: 401
  - Estimate (2024): 391
  - Density: 115.0/sq mi (44.41/km^{2})
- Time zone: UTC–6 (Central (CST))
  - Summer (DST): UTC–5 (CDT)
- ZIP Code: 58230
- Area code: 701
- FIPS code: 38-26420
- GNIS feature ID: 1036033
- Sales tax: 8.0%
- Website: finleynd.net

Finley is a city in Steele County, North Dakota, United States. It is the county seat of Steele County. The population was 401 at the 2020 census, and was estimated to be 391 in 2024. Finley was founded in 1897.

== History ==
Finley was founded in 1897. In 1911, a train wreck in Finley caused by a broken rail killed six and injured 13. In 1919, the county seat was transferred to Finley from Sherbrooke, North Dakota.

== Geography ==
According to the United States Census Bureau, the city has a total area of 3.47 square miles (8.99 km^{2}), all land.

== Demographics ==
Historical population
Census	Pop.	Note	%±
1910	516		—
1920	599		16.1%
1930	587		−2.0%
1940	677		15.3%
1950	671		−0.9%
1960	808		20.4%
1970	809		0.1%
1980	718		−11.2%
1990	543		−24.4%
2000	515		−5.2%
2010	445		−13.6%
2020	401		−9.9%
2024 (est.)	391		−2.5%
U.S. Decennial Census; 2020 Census

=== 2020 census ===
As of the 2020 census, there were 401 people, 188 households, and 108 families residing in the city.

=== 2010 census ===
As of the 2010 census, there were 445 people in 206 households, including 125 families, in the city. The population density was 128.2 inhabitants per square mile (49.5/km^{2}). There were 245 housing units at an average density of 70.6 per square mile (27.3/km^{2}). The racial makup of the city was 95.7% White, 0.2% African American, 2.2% Native American, 0.7% from other races, and 1.1% from two or more races. Hispanic or Latino of any race were 0.7%.

There were 206 households 25.7% had children under the age of 18 living with them, 49.0% were married couples living together, 5.8% had a female householder with no husband present, 5.8% had a male householder with no wife present, and 39.3% were non-families. 32.5% of households were one person and 19.9% were one person aged 65 or older. The average household size was 2.16 and the average family size was 2.67.

The median age was 45.9 years. 21.1% of residents were under the age of 18; 5.6% were between the ages of 18 and 24; 22.2% were from 25 to 44; 27.1% were from 45 to 64; and 23.8% were 65 or older. The gender makeup of the city was 49.4% male and 50.6% female.

=== 2000 census ===
As of the 2000 census, there were 515 people in 224 households, including 144 families, in the city. The population density was 147.4 inhabitants per square mile (56.9/km^{2}). There were 256 housing units at an average density of 73.3 per square mile (28.3/km^{2}). The racial makup of the city was 97.28% White, 1.75% Native American, 0.39% from other races, and 0.58% from two or more races. Hispanic or Latino of any race were 0.19% of the population.

Of the 224 households 28.1% had children under the age of 18 living with them, 54.9% were married couples living together, 8.0% had a female householder with no husband present, and 35.7% were non-families. 32.6% of households were one person and 18.3% were one person aged 65 or older. The average household size was 2.30 and the average family size was 2.95.

The age distribution was 26.0% under the age of 18, 6.4% from 18 to 24, 19.2% from 25 to 44, 23.9% from 45 to 64, and 24.5% 65 or older. The median age was 43 years. For every 100 females, there were 95.8 males. For every 100 females age 18 and over, there were 89.6 males.

The median household income was $32,917 and the median family income was $43,417. Males had a median income of $34,844 versus $17,500 for females. The per capita income for the city was $17,989. About 10.1% of families and 10.7% of the population were below the poverty line, including 18.4% of those under age 18 and 3.7% of those age 65 or over.

== Notable people ==
- LaurieBeth Hager, member of the North Dakota House of Representatives
- Harvey B. Knudson (1903–1978), justice of the North Dakota Supreme Court
- Peter O. Sathre (1876–1968), 16th North Dakota Attorney General and justice of the North Dakota Supreme Court
