= Hope, North Dakota =

- City
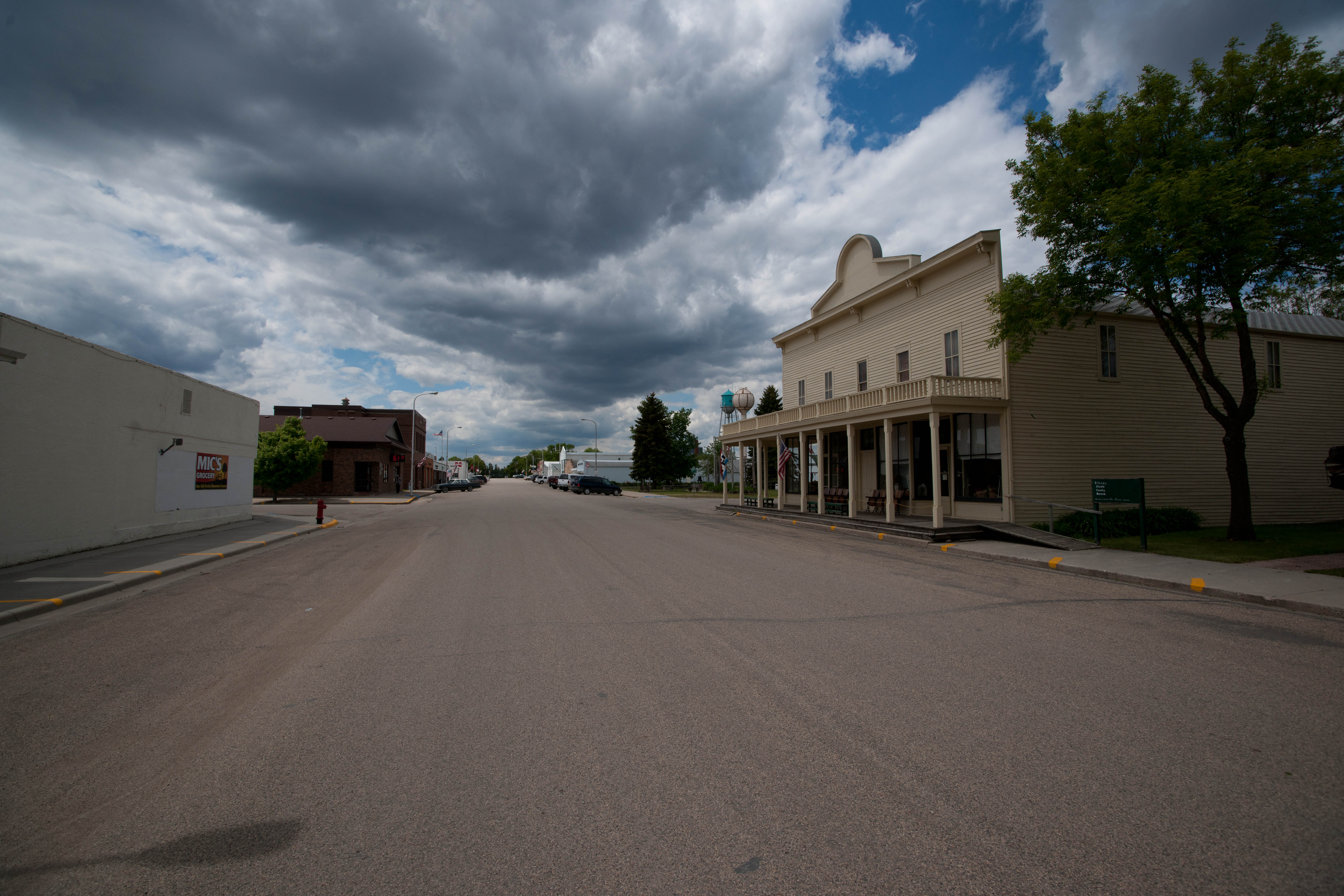
- View to the west along Steele Ave.; the NRHP-listed Baldwin's Arcade is at right

- Logo

- Location of Hope, North Dakota
- Coordinates: 47°19′28″N 97°43′09″W
- Country: United States
- State: North Dakota
- County: Steele
- Founded: 1881

Area
  - Total: 0.61 sq mi (1.59 km^{2})
  - Land: 0.61 sq mi (1.59 km^{2})
  - Water: 0 sq mi (0.00 km^{2})
- Elevation: 1,230 ft (375 m)

Population (2020)
  - Total: 272
  - Estimate (2022): 278
  - Density: 443.6/sq mi (171.29/km^{2})
- Time zone: UTC-6 (Central (CST))
  - Summer (DST): UTC-5 (CDT)
- ZIP code: 58046
- Area code: 701
- FIPS code: 38-38860
- GNIS feature ID: 1036094
- Website: hopend.com

Hope is a city in Steele County, North Dakota, United States. The population was 272 at the 2020 census. Hope was founded in 1881.

== Geography ==
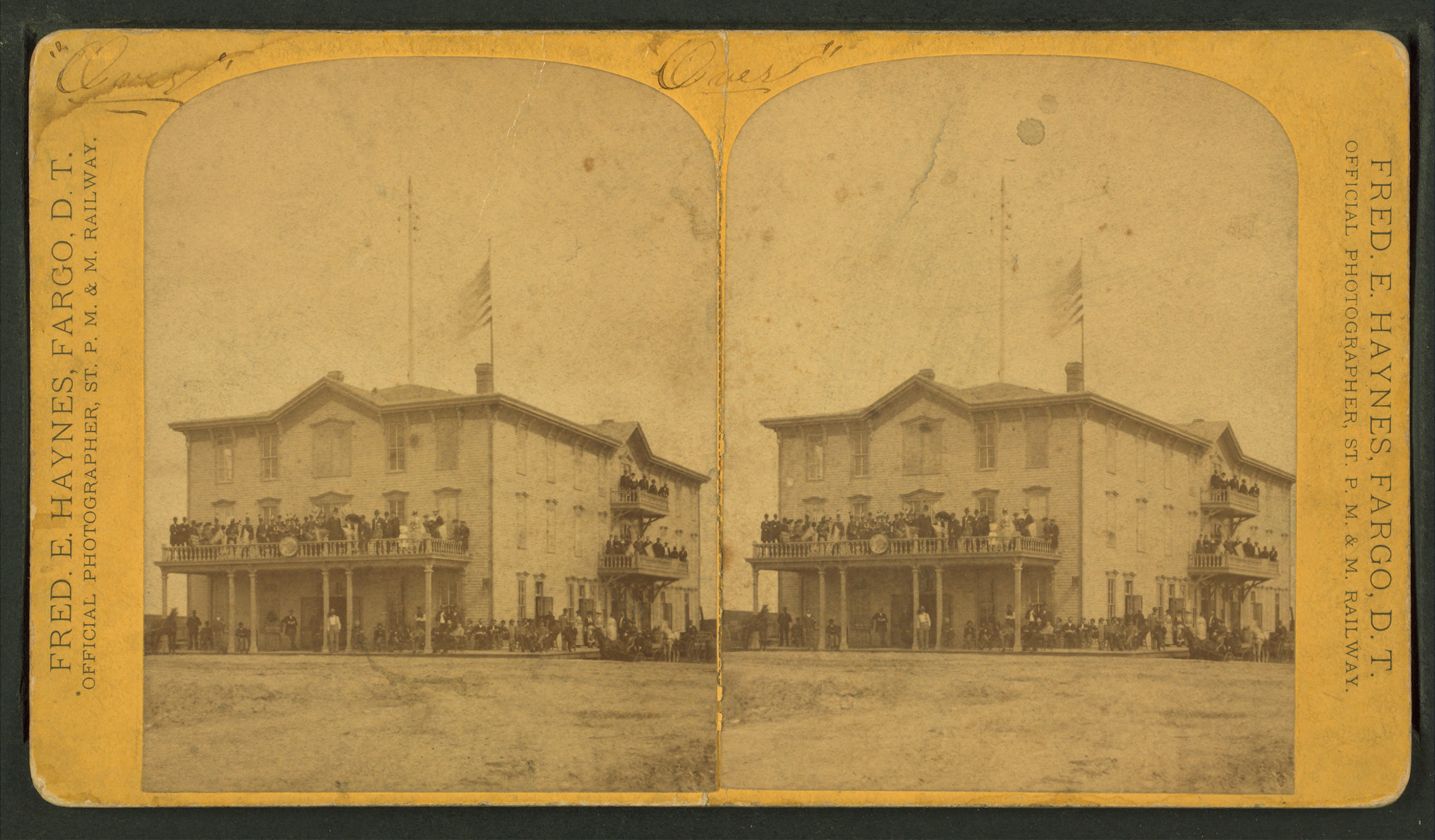
Stereo card of the Grand Central Hotel at Hope, then part of the Dakota Territory, 1882

According to the United States Census Bureau, the city has a total area of 0.62 square miles (1.61 km^{2}), all land.

== Demographics ==
Historical population
Census	Pop.	Note	%±
1890	238		—
1900	606		154.6%
1910	909		50.0%
1920	699		−23.1%
1930	535		−23.5%
1940	474		−11.4%
1950	470		−0.8%
1960	390		−17.0%
1970	364		−6.7%
1980	406		11.5%
1990	281		−30.8%
2000	303		7.8%
2010	258		−14.9%
2020	272		5.4%
2022 (est.)	278		2.2%
U.S. Decennial Census; 2020 Census

=== 2010 census ===
As of the census of 2010, there were 258 people, 131 households, and 75 families residing in the village. The population density was 416.1 inhabitants per square mile (160.7/km^{2}). There were 155 housing units at an average density of 250.0 per square mile (96.5/km^{2}). The racial makeup of the village was 100.0% White.

There were 131 households, of which 14.5% had children under the age of 18 living with them, 51.9% were married couples living together, 2.3% had a female householder with no husband present, 3.1% had a male householder with no wife present, and 42.7% were non-families. 39.7% of all households were made up of individuals, and 22.9% had someone living alone who was 65 years of age or older. The average household size was 1.97 and the average family size was 2.63.

The median age in the village was 52 years. 15.1% of residents were under the age of 18; 4.9% were between the ages of 18 and 24; 17.1% were from 25 to 44; 30.2% were from 45 to 64; and 32.6% were 65 years of age or older. The gender makeup of the village was 47.7% male and 52.3% female.

=== 2000 census ===
As of the census of 2000, there were 303 people, 131 households, and 75 families residing in the village. The population density was 491.0 inhabitants per square mile (189.6/km^{2}). There were 155 housing units at an average density of 251.1 per square mile (97.0/km^{2}). The racial makeup of the village was 98.68% White, 0.33% African American, 0.33% Asian, 0.66% from other races. Hispanic or Latino of any race were 0.66% of the population.

There were 131 households, out of which 26.7% had children under the age of 18 living with them, 49.6% were married couples living together, 6.9% had a female householder with no husband present, and 42.0% were non-families. 37.4% of all households were made up of individuals, and 18.3% had someone living alone who was 65 years of age or older. The average household size was 2.31 and the average family size was 3.14.

In the village, the population was spread out, with 29.7% under the age of 18, 4.3% from 18 to 24, 26.1% from 25 to 44, 16.2% from 45 to 64, and 23.8% who were 65 years of age or older. The median age was 41 years. For every 100 females, there were 94.2 males. For every 100 females age 18 and over, there were 97.2 males.

The median income for a household in the village was $31,042, and the median income for a family was $44,167. Males had a median income of $29,625 versus $21,875 for females. The per capita income for the village was $16,724. None of the families and 2.0% of the population were living below the poverty line.

== Education ==
Hope is part of the Hope-Page School District. Students attend elementary school (K-6) in Page while students attend middle school through high school (7-12) in Hope.

== Climate ==
This climatic region is typified by large seasonal temperature differences, with warm to hot (and often humid) summers and cold (sometimes severely cold) winters. According to the Köppen Climate Classification system, Hope has a humid continental climate, abbreviated "Dfb" on climate maps.
