= Beach Township, North Dakota =

- Township
- Location in North Dakota
- Coordinates: 46.892458°N 103.954824°W
- Country: United States
- State: North Dakota
- County: Golden Valley

Area
  - Total: 105 sq mi (272 km^{2})
  - Land: 104.9 sq mi (271.7 km^{2})
  - Water: 0.12 sq mi (0.3 km^{2})
- Elevation: 2,858 ft (871 m)

Population (2020)
  - Total: 154
  - Density: 1.47/sq mi (0.567/km^{2})
- Area code: 701
- FIPS code: 38-05460
- GNIS ID: 1037079

Beach Township is a township in Golden Valley County, North Dakota. Its population was 157 as of the 2010 census, down from 189 in 2000.

== Geography ==
The township covers an area containing 104.911 square miles (271.72 km^{2}) of land and 0.097 square miles (0.25 km^{2}) water, and it is located at 46.892458°N 103.954824°W. The elevation is 2,858 feet (871 m).

The township of Beach is located on the western border of the county and the state. It surrounds the city of Beach and borders the following other townships in Golden Valley County:

- Saddle Butte – north
- Delhi – north
- Sentinel – east
- Garner – southeast corner
- Lone Tree – south

== Demographics ==
As of the 2023 American Community Survey, there were an estimated 89 households.
