= Elmwood Township, North Dakota =

Former township in North Dakota

Elmwood Township was a township in Golden Valley County, North Dakota, United States. The former township became the Elmwood Unorganized Territory.

As of the 2000 census the township's population was 9 while it covered an area containing 35.643 square miles (92.31 km^{2}), all land, and was located at 47.119653°N 103.964660°W. The elevation was 2,625 feet (800 m).

The township was located on the western border of the county and the state. It bordered the following other townships in Golden Valley County:

- Henry – north
- Pearl – northeast corner
- Elk Creek – east
- Delhi – southeast corner
- Saddle Butte – south
