= Saddle Butte Township, North Dakota =

Saddle Butte Township, North Dakota Township of Saddle Butte
- Township
- Location within North Dakota
- Coordinates: 47°01′24″N 103°59′01″W
- Country: United States
- State: North Dakota
- County: Golden Valley

Area
  - Total: 35.45 sq mi (91.81 km^{2})
  - Land: 35.27 sq mi (91.35 km^{2})
  - Water: 0.18 sq mi (0.46 km^{2})
- Elevation: 2,707 ft (825 m)

Population (2020)
  - Total: 41
  - Density: 1.2/sq mi (0.45/km^{2})
- Time zone: UTC-7 (Mountain (MST))
  - Summer (DST): UTC-6 (MDT)
- ZIP code: 58621 (Beach)
- Area code: 701
- FIPS code: 38-69580
- GNIS feature ID: 1037074

Saddle Butte Township is a township in Golden Valley County, North Dakota, United States. The population was 41 at the 2020 census, up from 25 in 2010; the population was 27 in 2000.

== Geography ==
Saddle Butte Township has a total area of 35.449 square miles (91.81 km^{2}), of which 35.271 square miles (91.35 km^{2}) is land and 0.178 square miles (0.46 km^{2}) is water. The township is located on the western border of the county and the state. It borders the following other townships in Golden Valley County:

- Elk Creek—northeast corner
- Delhi—east
- Beach—south

It is bordered to the north by Elmwood Unorganized Territory, formerly Elmwood Township.

=== Major highways ===
- North Dakota Highway 16
