= Lone Tree Township, North Dakota =

- Township
- Location within North Dakota
- Coordinates: 46°43′02″N 103°57′19″W
- Country: United States
- State: North Dakota
- County: Golden Valley

Area
  - Total: 105.2 sq mi (272.4 km^{2})
  - Land: 105.1 sq mi (272.1 km^{2})
  - Water: 0.13 sq mi (0.34 km^{2})
- Elevation: 2,818 ft (859 m)

Population (2020)
  - Total: 146
  - Density: 1.39/sq mi (0.537/km^{2})
- Time zone: UTC-7 (Mountain (MST))
  - Summer (DST): UTC-6 (MDT)
- ZIP codes: 58621 (Beach); 58632 (Golva); 58654 (Sentinel Butte)
- Area code: 701
- FIPS code: 38-47700
- GNIS feature ID: 1037205

Lone Tree Township is a township in Golden Valley County, North Dakota, United States. The population was 146 at the 2020 census.

The city of Golva is entirely surrounded by Lone Tree Township.

== Geography ==
Lone Tree Township has a total area of 105.19 square miles (272.4 km^{2}), of which 105.06 square miles (272.1 km^{2}) is land and 0.13 square miles (0.34 km^{2}) is water.

=== Major highways ===
- North Dakota Highway 16
