= Bullion Township, North Dakota =

- Township
- Location within North Dakota
- Coordinates: 46°40′23″N 103°47′52″W
- Country: United States
- State: North Dakota
- County: Golden Valley

Area
  - Total: 35.85 sq mi (92.85 km^{2})
  - Land: 35.83 sq mi (92.80 km^{2})
  - Water: 0.019 sq mi (0.05 km^{2})
- Elevation: 2,753 ft (839 m)

Population (2020)
  - Total: 28
  - Density: 0.78/sq mi (0.30/km^{2})
- Time zone: UTC-7 (Mountain (MST))
  - Summer (DST): UTC-6 (MDT)
- ZIP codes: 58632 (Golva); 58654 (Sentinel Butte)
- Area code: 701
- FIPS code: 38-10660
- GNIS feature ID: 1037076

Bullion Township is a township in Golden Valley County, North Dakota, United States. The population was 28 at the 2020 census.

The unincorporated community of Alpha is located within Bullion Township.

== Geography ==
Bullion Township has a total area of 35.850 square miles (92.85 km^{2}), of which 35.831 square miles (92.80 km^{2}) is land and 0.019 square miles (0.049 km^{2}) is water.

== Demographics ==
As of the 2023 American Community Survey, there were an estimated 15 households.
