= North Golden Valley, North Dakota =

- Unorganized territory
- Location within North Dakota
- Coordinates: 47°09′05″N 103°43′52″W
- Country: United States
- State: North Dakota
- County: Golden Valley

Area
  - Total: 143.31 sq mi (371.16 km^{2})
  - Land: 143.16 sq mi (370.77 km^{2})
  - Water: 0.15 sq mi (0.38 km^{2})
- Elevation: 2,536 ft (773 m)

Population (2020)
  - Total: 27
  - Density: 0.19/sq mi (0.073/km^{2})
- Time zone: UTC-7 (Mountain (MST))
  - Summer (DST): UTC-6 (MDT)
- ZIP codes: 58621 (Beach); 58654 (Sentinel Butte)
- Area code: 701
- FIPS code: 38-57865
- GNIS feature ID: 1036194

North Golden Valley is an unorganized territory in Golden Valley County, North Dakota, United States. The population was 27 at the 2020 census.

== Geography ==
North Golden Valley has a total area of 143.304 square miles (371.16 km^{2}), of which 143.156 square miles (370.77 km^{2}) is land and 0.148 square miles (0.38 km^{2}) is water.
