= South Golden Valley, North Dakota =

- Unorganized territory
- Location within North Dakota
- Coordinates: 46°35′03″N 103°55′36″W
- Country: United States
- State: North Dakota
- County: Golden Valley

Area
  - Total: 71.42 sq mi (184.98 km^{2})
  - Land: 71.18 sq mi (184.36 km^{2})
  - Water: 0.24 sq mi (0.62 km^{2})
- Elevation: 2,871 ft (875 m)

Population (2020)
  - Total: 18
  - Density: 0.25/sq mi (0.098/km^{2})
- Time zone: UTC-7 (Mountain (MST))
  - Summer (DST): UTC-6 (MDT)
- ZIP code: 58632 (Golva); 58654 (Sentinel Butte)
- Area code: 701
- FIPS code: 38-74180
- GNIS feature ID: 1036271

South Golden Valley is an unorganized territory in Golden Valley County, North Dakota, United States. The population was 18 at the 2020 census.

== Geography ==
South Golden Valley has a total area of 71.420 square miles (184.98 km^{2}), of which 71.180 square miles (184.36 km^{2}) is land and 0.240 square miles (0.62 km^{2}) is water.
