= Trotters, North Dakota =

- Unincorporated town
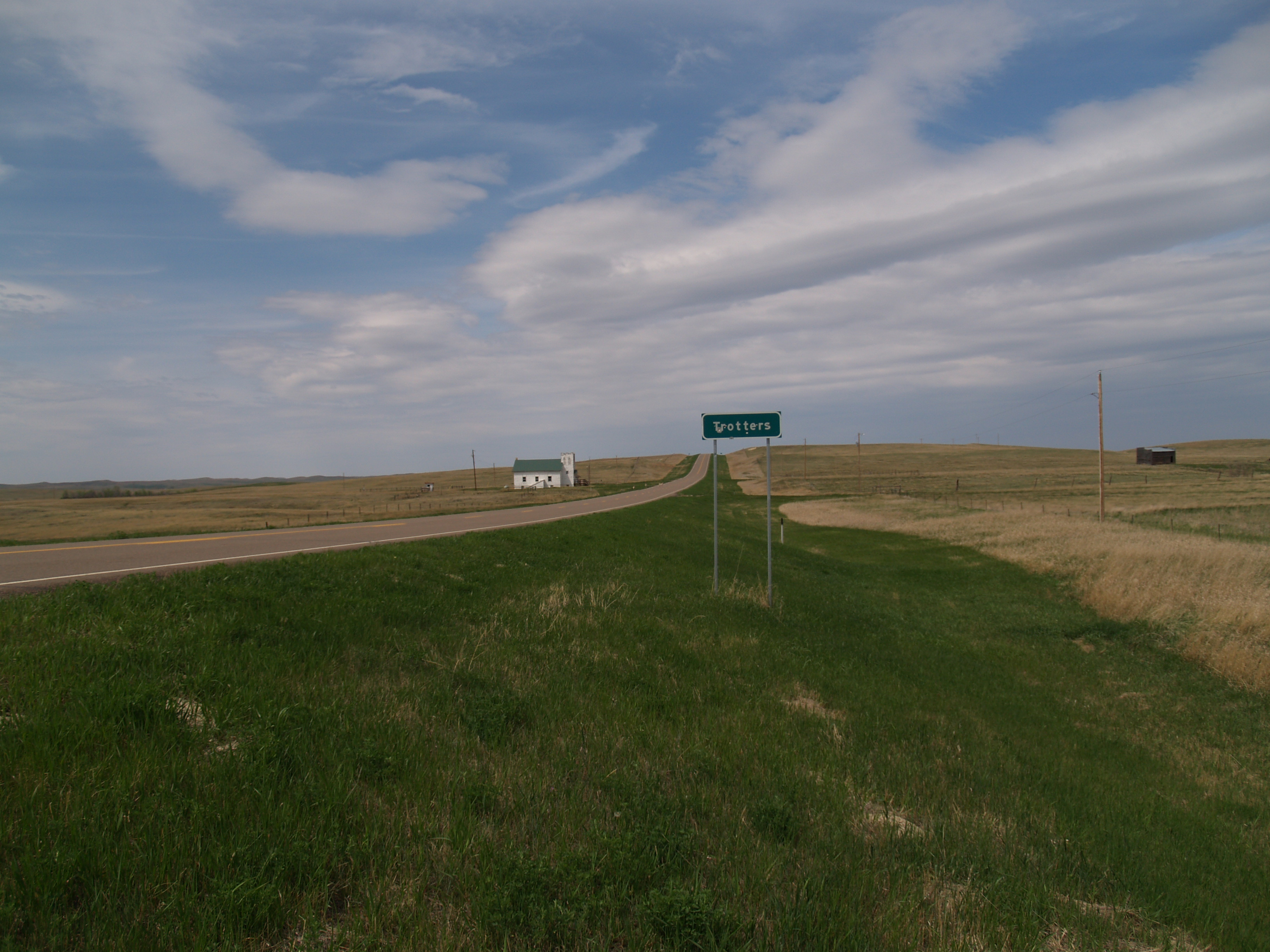
- Looking north at Trotters on ND 16

- Location within North Dakota Location within the United States
- Coordinates: 47°19′23″N 103°55′06″W
- Country: United States
- State: North Dakota
- County: Golden Valley
- Elevation: 2,421 ft (738 m)
- Time zone: UTC-7 (Mountain (MST))
  - Summer (DST): UTC-6 (MDT)
- Area code: 701
- GNIS feature ID: 1035220

Trotters is an unincorporated town in Golden Valley County, North Dakota, United States. Trotters is located on North Dakota Highway 16, 28.3 miles (45.5 km) north of Beach. The community did not receive telephone service until 1972, and Highway 16, its only road, was paved in the 1980s.

== Name ==
Trotters was named after Francis Leighton Trotter (surname sometimes Trotters, 1865–1908), who served as the first postmaster in the community. Trotter carried mail from Wibaux, Montana for a year without pay in order to establish the post office.

== History ==
Leonard Hall, who moved to Trotters in 1956, was the town's only resident for much of the twentieth century. Hall was the postmaster of the Trotters post office, which opened in 1904 and served area ranchers as far as 28 miles (45 km) away from Trotters, as few other post offices operated in the region. The post office also served as the town's grocery store and gas station, and Hall lived in the back of the building. Two other buildings, a disused church and an empty abandoned structure, also stood in the town. The post office closed in 1995 when Hall's poor health caused him to retire as postmaster.

== Climate ==
According to the Köppen Climate Classification system, Trotters has a semi-arid climate, abbreviated "BSk" on climate maps.

Climate data for Hazelton, North Dakota, 1991–2020 normals, extremes 1959–2011
Month	Jan	Feb	Mar	Apr	May	Jun	Jul	Aug	Sep	Oct	Nov	Dec	Year
Record high °F (°C)	60 (16)	66 (19)	79 (26)	92 (33)	101 (38)	106 (41)	110 (43)	105 (41)	103 (39)	93 (34)	81 (27)	61 (16)	110 (43)
Mean maximum °F (°C)	48.1 (8.9)	51.4 (10.8)	67.0 (19.4)	79.6 (26.4)	86.4 (30.2)	92.9 (33.8)	99.8 (37.7)	98.8 (37.1)	93.3 (34.1)	80.6 (27.0)	62.8 (17.1)	48.5 (9.2)	102.1 (38.9)
Mean daily maximum °F (°C)	26.3 (−3.2)	30.5 (−0.8)	42.8 (6.0)	56.4 (13.6)	66.8 (19.3)	75.9 (24.4)	84.8 (29.3)	84.4 (29.1)	72.9 (22.7)	56.2 (13.4)	40.5 (4.7)	29.3 (−1.5)	55.6 (13.1)
Daily mean °F (°C)	16.6 (−8.6)	20.3 (−6.5)	31.5 (−0.3)	43.4 (6.3)	53.9 (12.2)	63.2 (17.3)	70.6 (21.4)	69.5 (20.8)	59.2 (15.1)	44.4 (6.9)	30.4 (−0.9)	19.9 (−6.7)	43.6 (6.4)
Mean daily minimum °F (°C)	6.9 (−13.9)	10.1 (−12.2)	20.2 (−6.6)	30.4 (−0.9)	41.0 (5.0)	50.5 (10.3)	56.3 (13.5)	54.6 (12.6)	45.3 (7.4)	32.6 (0.3)	20.3 (−6.5)	10.5 (−11.9)	31.6 (−0.2)
Mean minimum °F (°C)	−19.2 (−28.4)	−14.6 (−25.9)	−2.9 (−19.4)	13.5 (−10.3)	25.9 (−3.4)	38.6 (3.7)	45.5 (7.5)	42.5 (5.8)	28.1 (−2.2)	12.9 (−10.6)	−1.1 (−18.4)	−18.5 (−28.1)	−26.6 (−32.6)
Record low °F (°C)	−37 (−38)	−37 (−38)	−35 (−37)	−7 (−22)	16 (−9)	29 (−2)	38 (3)	30 (−1)	17 (−8)	−3 (−19)	−22 (−30)	−37 (−38)	−37 (−38)
Average precipitation inches (mm)	0.36 (9.1)	0.41 (10)	0.61 (15)	1.39 (35)	2.52 (64)	2.80 (71)	2.28 (58)	1.45 (37)	1.56 (40)	1.29 (33)	0.61 (15)	0.47 (12)	15.75 (399.1)
Average snowfall inches (cm)	5.3 (13)	5.2 (13)	4.7 (12)	4.5 (11)	1.3 (3.3)	0.0 (0.0)	0.0 (0.0)	0.0 (0.0)	0.1 (0.25)	3.1 (7.9)	5.3 (13)	5.6 (14)	35.1 (87.45)
Average precipitation days (≥ 0.01 in)	7.3	6.0	7.6	8.1	12.6	13.0	9.3	7.4	7.2	7.4	6.4	7.0	99.3
Average snowy days (≥ 0.1 in)	7.5	6.2	5.4	3.0	0.8	0.0	0.0	0.0	0.2	1.9	5.4	6.7	37.1
Source 1: NOAA
Source 2: National Weather Service (mean maxima and minima 1981–2010)
