= Velgonda, Karimnagar district =

Coordinates: 18.8975°N 79.0546°E

Velgonda is a village in Karimnagar district, Telangana, India. It falls under Dharmapuri mandal. The National Highway 16 or NH-16 passes through this village.
