= List of highways numbered 16 =

Route 16, or Highway 16, can refer to:

== International ==
- AH16 Asian Highway 16
- E16 European route E16
- E016 European route E016

== Australia ==
– Thompsons Road (Victoria)

– South Australia

== Canada ==
Parts of the Trans-Canada Highway

- Yellowhead Highway, part of the Trans-Canada Highway system
  - Alberta Highway 16
    - Alberta Highway 16A
    - Alberta Highway 16X (former)
  - British Columbia Highway 16
  - Manitoba Highway 16
    - Manitoba Highway 16A
  - Saskatchewan Highway 16
    - Saskatchewan Highway 16A
    - Saskatchewan Highway 16B
- New Brunswick Route 16

Other instances of Highway 16

- Nova Scotia Trunk 16
- Ontario Highway 16
- Prince Edward Island Route 16

== China ==
- G16 Expressway

== Cuba ==
- Highway I–16
  - Highway 3–I–16
  - Highway 4–I–16
- 2–16

== Czech Republic ==
- I/16 Highway; Czech: Silnice I/16

== Greece ==
- EO16 road

== India ==
- National Highway 16 (India)

== Israel ==
- Highway 16 (Israel)

== Iran ==
- Freeway 16
- Road 16

== Ireland ==
- N16 road (Ireland)

== Italy ==
- Autostrada A16
- RA 16

== Japan ==
- Japan National Route 16
- Route 16 (Nagoya Expressway)
- Ōsakakō Route

== Korea, South ==
- Ulsan Expressway

== Malaysia ==
- FT 16 Senai Airport Highway

== New Zealand ==
- New Zealand State Highway 16

== Paraguay ==
- National Route 16

== United Kingdom ==
- British A16 (Peterborough-Grimsby)

== United States ==
- Interstate 16
- U.S. Route 16
- New England Route 16 (former)
- Alabama State Route 16 (former)
  - County Route 16 (Lee County, Alabama)
- Arkansas Highway 16
- California State Route 16
  - County Route A16 (California)
  - County Route E16 (California)
  - County Route G16 (California)
  - County Route J16 (California)
  - County Route S16 (California)
- Colorado State Highway 16
- Connecticut Route 16
- Delaware Route 16
- Florida State Road 16
- Georgia State Route 16
- Hawaii Route 16 (former)
- Idaho State Highway 16
- Illinois Route 16
- Indiana State Road 16
- Iowa Highway 16
- K-16 (Kansas highway)
- Kentucky Route 16
- Louisiana Highway 16
  - Louisiana State Route 16 (former)
- Maine State Route 16
- Maryland Route 16
- Massachusetts Route 16
- M-16 (Michigan highway) (former)
- Minnesota State Highway 16
  - County Road 16 (St. Louis County, Minnesota)
- Mississippi Highway 16
- Missouri Route 16
- Montana Highway 16
- Nebraska Highway 16
  - Nebraska Spur 16B
  - Nebraska Spur 16F
  - Nebraska Recreation Road 16C
  - Nebraska Recreation Road 16D
- Nevada State Route 16 (former)
- New Hampshire Route 16
  - New Hampshire Route 16B
- New Mexico State Road 16
- County Route 16 (Monmouth County, New Jersey)
- New York State Route 16
  - County Route 16 (Allegany County, New York)
  - County Route 16 (Cattaraugus County, New York)
  - County Route 16 (Cayuga County, New York)
  - County Route 16 (Chautauqua County, New York)
  - County Route 16 (Chenango County, New York)
  - County Route 16 (Clinton County, New York)
  - County Route 16 (Dutchess County, New York)
  - County Route 16 (Franklin County, New York)
  - County Route 16 (Herkimer County, New York)
  - County Route 16 (Lewis County, New York)
  - County Route 16 (Monroe County, New York)
  - County Route 16 (Oneida County, New York)
  - County Route 16 (Orange County, New York)
  - County Route 16 (Otsego County, New York)
  - County Route 16 (Putnam County, New York)
  - County Route 16 (Rensselaer County, New York)
  - County Route 16 (Schenectady County, New York)
  - County Route 16 (Schuyler County, New York)
  - County Route 16 (Steuben County, New York)
  - County Route 16 (Suffolk County, New York)
  - County Route 16 (Ulster County, New York)
  - County Route 16 (Warren County, New York)
- North Carolina Highway 16
- North Dakota Highway 16
- Ohio State Route 16
- Oklahoma State Highway 16
- Pennsylvania Route 16
- South Carolina Highway 16
- South Dakota Highway 16 (former)
  - South Dakota Highway 16B (former)
- Tennessee State Route 16
- Texas State Highway 16
  - Texas State Highway Loop 16 (former)
  - Texas State Highway Spur 16
  - Farm to Market Road 16
  - Texas Park Road 16
- Utah State Route 16
- Vermont Route 16
- Virginia State Route 16
  - State Route 16 (Virginia 1918-1940) (former)
- Washington State Route 16
  - Primary State Highway 16 (Washington) (former)
- West Virginia Route 16
- Wisconsin Highway 16

Territories

- Guam Highway 16
- Puerto Rico Highway 16

== Zambia ==
- M16 road (Zambia)

== See also ==
- List of A16 roads
- List of highways numbered 16A
- Route-16
- The Highway, a SiriusXM channel previously known as Highway 16.

Preceded by 15	Lists of highways 16	Succeeded by 17
