= North Dakota Highway 68 =

State highway in North Dakota, U.S.

North Dakota Highway 68

Route information
- Maintained by NDDOT
- Length: 28.124 mi (45.261 km)

Major junctions
- West end: MT 23 at the Montana border east of Sidney, MT
- East end: US 85 / ND 200 south of Alexander

Location
- Country: United States
- State: North Dakota
- Counties: McKenzie

Highway system
- North Dakota State Highway System; Interstate; US; State
← ND 67	→ ND 69

North Dakota Highway 68 (ND 68) is a 28.124-mile-long (45.261 km) east–west state highway in the U.S. state of North Dakota. ND 68's western terminus is a continuation as Montana Highway 23 (MT 23) at the Montana border, and the eastern terminus is at U.S. Route 85 (US 85)/ND 200 south of Alexander.

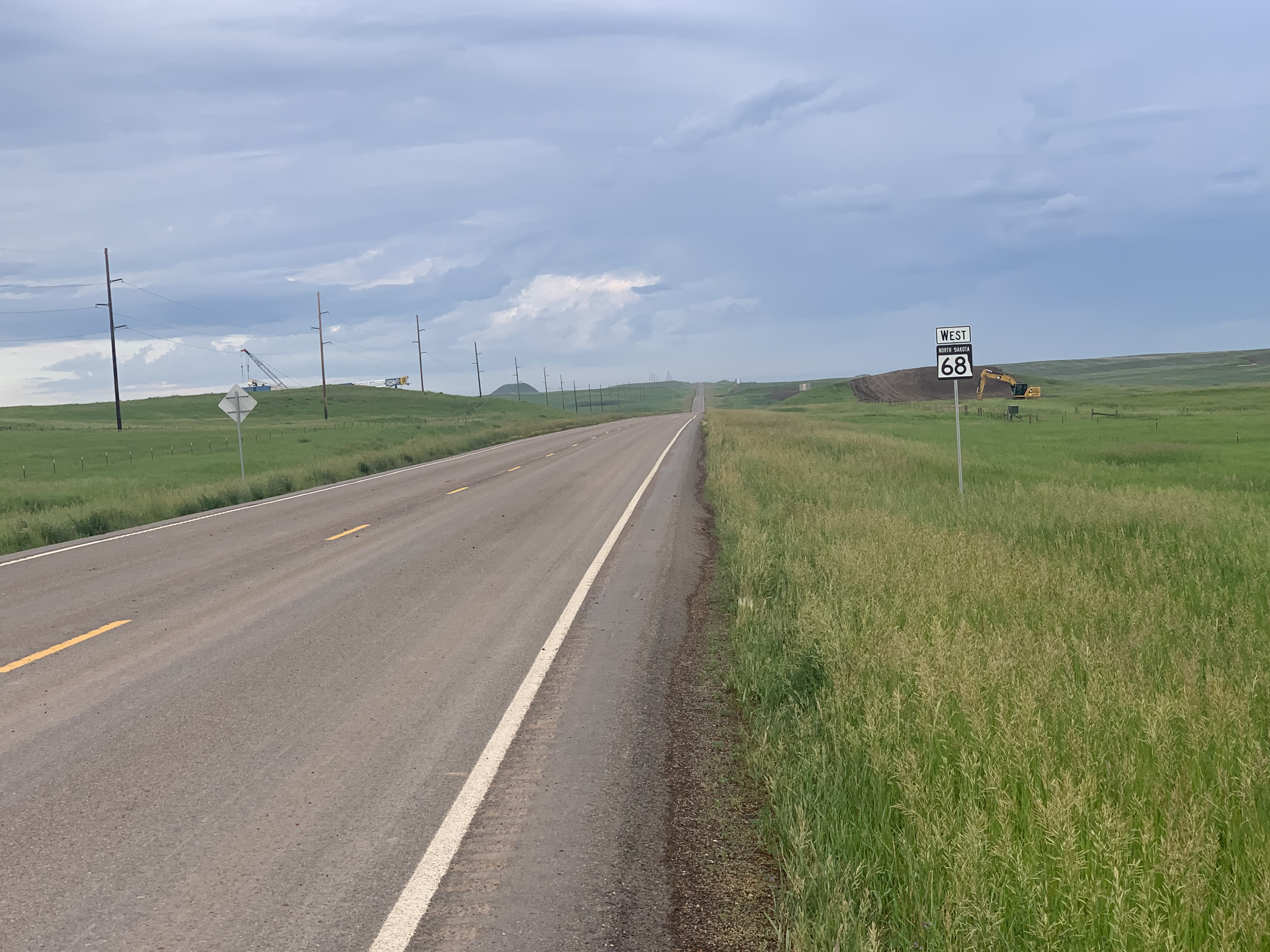
North Dakota Highway 68

== Major intersections ==
The entire route is in McKenzie County.

Location	mi	km	Destinations	Notes
	0.000	0.000	MT 23 – Sidney	Continuation into Montana
	11.441	18.413	ND 16 south – Beach	Northern terminus of ND 16
	28.124	45.261	US 85/ ND 200	Eastern terminus
1.000 mi = 1.609 km; 1.000 km = 0.621 mi
