= Henry Township, North Dakota =

- Township
- Location within North Dakota
- Coordinates: 47°14′18″N 103°58′57″W
- Country: United States
- State: North Dakota
- County: Golden Valley

Area
  - Total: 72.25 sq mi (187.12 km^{2})
  - Land: 72.19 sq mi (186.98 km^{2})
  - Water: 0.056 sq mi (0.15 km^{2})
- Elevation: 2,487 ft (758 m)

Population (2020)
  - Total: 14
  - Density: 0.19/sq mi (0.075/km^{2})
- Time zone: UTC-7 (Mountain (MST))
  - Summer (DST): UTC-6 (MDT)
- ZIP code: 58621 (Beach)
- Area code: 701
- FIPS code: 38-37340
- GNIS feature ID: 1759435

Henry Township is a township in Golden Valley County, North Dakota, United States. The population was 14 at the 2020 census.

== Geography ==
Henry Township has a total area of 72.248 square miles (187.12 km^{2}), of which 72.192 square miles (186.98 km^{2}) is land and 0.056 square miles (0.15 km^{2}) is water.

=== Major highways ===
- North Dakota Highway 16
