= East Golden Valley, North Dakota =

- Unorganized territory
- Location within North Dakota
- Coordinates: 46°43′05″N 103°49′22″W
- Country: United States
- State: North Dakota
- County: Golden Valley

Area
  - Total: 71.41 sq mi (184.95 km^{2})
  - Land: 71.26 sq mi (184.57 km^{2})
  - Water: 0.15 sq mi (0.38 km^{2})
- Elevation: 2,608 ft (795 m)

Population (2020)
  - Total: 22
  - Density: 0.31/sq mi (0.12/km^{2})
- Time zone: UTC-7 (Mountain (MST))
  - Summer (DST): UTC-6 (MDT)
- ZIP codes: 58645 (Medora); 58654 (Sentinel Butte)
- Area code: 701
- FIPS code: 38-21665
- GNIS feature ID: 1036004

East Golden Valley is an unorganized territory in Golden Valley County, North Dakota, United States. The population was 22 at the 2020 census.

== Geography ==
East Golden Valley has a total area of 71.409 square miles (184.95 km^{2}), of which 71.264 square miles (184.57 km^{2}) is land and 0.145 square miles (0.38 km^{2}) is water.
