= A16 =

A16, A 16, A.16 or A-16 may refer to:

- A16 road, in several countries
- ATC code A16, Other alimentary tract and metabolism products, a subgroup of the Anatomical Therapeutic Chemical Classification System
- British NVC community A16 (Callitriche stagnalis community), a British Isles plant community

It may also refer to:

== Technology ==
- Apple A16 Bionic, a system on a chip mobile processor designed by Apple
- Samsung Galaxy A16, an Android device developed by Samsung Electronics

== Transportation ==
- A16 road, in several countries
- Aviadesign A-16 Sport Falcon, an American light-sport aircraft
- Focke-Wulf A.16, a 1926 German three-four passenger light transport monoplane
- A16 station, an upcoming MTR station on the West Rail line Tuen Mun South extension

== Other uses ==
- ATC code A16, Other alimentary tract and metabolism products, a subgroup of the Anatomical Therapeutic Chemical Classification System
- British NVC community A16 (Callitriche stagnalis community), a British Isles plant commu
- A16 (restaurant), a restaurant in the San Francisco Bay Area
- Subfamily A16, a rhodopsin-like receptors subfamily
- English Opening, in chess (Encyclopaedia of Chess Openings code A16, among others)
- Washington A16, 2000 protests in Washington, D.C. against the International Monetary Fund and the World Bank on April 16 of 2000 and 2005, both known as "A16"
