= List of A16 roads =

This is a list of roads designated A16. Roads entries are sorted in the countries alphabetical order.

- Grand Junction Road, in South Australia connecting Port Adelaide and the Adelaide Hills
- A16 motorway (Belgium), a road connecting Mons and Tournai
- A16 motorway (France), a road connecting Abbeville and Dunkirk
- A16 motorway (Italy), a road connecting Naples and Canosa
- A16 highway (Lithuania), a road connecting Vilnius, Prienai and Marijampolė
- A16 road (Malaysia), a road connecting Kampung Labu Kubong and Kampung Changkat Petai
- A16 motorway (Netherlands), a road connecting the interchange Zestienhoven near Rotterdam and the Belgian border near Breda
- A-16 motorway (Spain), a road connecting Barcelona and El Vendrell
- A 16 road (Sri Lanka), a road connecting Beragala and Hali ela
- A16 motorway (Switzerland), a road connecting Boncourt at the French border and Biel/Bienne
- A16 road (United Kingdom) may refer to:
  - A16 road (England), a road connecting Grimsby and Peterborough
  - A16 road (Isle of Man), a road connecting Bride and Point of Ayre road
- A16 road (United States of America) may refer to:
  - A16 road (California), a road connecting the SR 36 and the SR 273 in Redding

== See also ==
- List of highways numbered 16
