= Sentinel Township, North Dakota =

- Township
- Location within North Dakota
- Coordinates: 46°53′23″N 103°44′09″W
- Country: United States
- State: North Dakota
- County: Golden Valley

Area
  - Total: 143.91 sq mi (372.73 km^{2})
  - Land: 143.62 sq mi (371.98 km^{2})
  - Water: 0.29 sq mi (0.75 km^{2})
- Elevation: 2,651 ft (808 m)

Population (2020)
  - Total: 65
  - Density: 0.45/sq mi (0.17/km^{2})
- Time zone: UTC-7 (Mountain (MST))
  - Summer (DST): UTC-6 (MDT)
- ZIP codes: 58645 (Medora); 58654 (Sentinel Butte)
- Area code: 701
- FIPS code: 38-71740
- GNIS feature ID: 1037078

Sentinel Township is a township in Golden Valley County, North Dakota, United States. The population was 65 at the 2020 census.

Sentinel Township gets its name from Sentinel Butte, a city which the township surrounds.

== Geography ==
Sentinel Township has a total area of 143.910 square miles (372.73 km^{2}), of which 143.621 square miles (371.98 km^{2}) is land and 0.289 square miles (0.75 km^{2}) is water.

=== Major highways ===
- Interstate 94
