= Pearl Township, North Dakota =

- Township
- Location within North Dakota
- Coordinates: 47°14′31″N 103°51′22″W
- Country: United States
- State: North Dakota
- County: Golden Valley

Area
  - Total: 72.29 sq mi (187.23 km^{2})
  - Land: 72.18 sq mi (186.95 km^{2})
  - Water: 0.11 sq mi (0.28 km^{2})
- Elevation: 2,415 ft (736 m)

Population (2020)
  - Total: 11
  - Density: 0.15/sq mi (0.059/km^{2})
- Time zone: UTC-7 (Mountain (MST))
  - Summer (DST): UTC-6 (MDT)
- ZIP code: 58621 (Beach)
- Area code: 701
- FIPS code: 38-61340
- GNIS feature ID: 1759436

Pearl Township is a township in Golden Valley County, North Dakota, United States. The population was 11 at the 2020 census.

== Geography ==
Pearl Township has a total area of 72.288 square miles (187.23 km^{2}), of which 72.180 square miles (186.95 km^{2}) is land and 0.108 square miles (0.28 km^{2}) is water.
