= Garner Township, North Dakota =

- Township
- Location within North Dakota
- Coordinates: 46°45′36″N 103°47′52″W
- Country: United States
- State: North Dakota
- County: Golden Valley

Area
  - Total: 35.89 sq mi (92.96 km^{2})
  - Land: 35.86 sq mi (92.87 km^{2})
  - Water: 0.033 sq mi (0.085 km^{2})
- Elevation: 2,822 ft (860 m)

Population (2020)
  - Total: 12
  - Density: 0.33/sq mi (0.13/km^{2})
- Time zone: UTC-7 (Mountain (MST))
  - Summer (DST): UTC-6 (MDT)
- Area code: 701
- FIPS code: 38-29340
- GNIS feature ID: 1037077

Garner Township is a township in Golden Valley County, North Dakota, United States. The population was 12 at the 2020 census.

== Geography ==
Garner Township has a total area of 35.892 square miles (92.96 km^{2}), of which 35.859 square miles (92.87 km^{2}) is land and 0.033 square miles (0.085 km^{2}) is water.

== Demographics ==
As of the 2023 American Community Survey, there were an estimated 2 households.
