= Delhi Township, North Dakota =

- Township
- Location within North Dakota
- Coordinates: 47°01′24″N 103°51′26″W
- Country: United States
- State: North Dakota
- County: Golden Valley

Area
  - Total: 35.90 sq mi (92.99 km^{2})
  - Land: 35.85 sq mi (92.86 km^{2})
  - Water: 0.048 sq mi (0.12 km^{2})
- Elevation: 2,809 ft (856 m)

Population (2020)
  - Total: 33
  - Density: 0.92/sq mi (0.36/km^{2})
- Time zone: UTC-7 (Mountain (MST))
  - Summer (DST): UTC-6 (MDT)
- ZIP codes: 58621 (Beach); 58654 (Sentinel Butte)
- Area code: 701
- FIPS code: 38-18900
- GNIS feature ID: 1759432

Delhi Township is a township in Golden Valley County, North Dakota, United States. The population was 33 at the 2020 census.

== Geography ==
Delhi Township has a total area of 35.902 square miles (92.99 km^{2}), of which 35.854 square miles (92.86 km^{2}) is land and 0.048 square miles (0.12 km^{2}) is water.

== Demographics ==
As of the 2023 American Community Survey, there were an estimated 20 households.
