= European route E016 =

Road in trans-European E-road network

E016

Route information
- Length: 490 km (300 mi)

Major junctions
- From: Zapadnoye
- To: Astana

Location
- Countries: Kazakhstan

Highway system
- International E-road network; A Class; B Class

E 016 is a European B class road in Kazakhstan, connecting the cities Zapadnoye - Astana.

== Route ==
- Kazakhstan
  - Zapadnoye
  - Astana
