= Aviadesign A-16 Sport Falcon =

American light-sport aircraft

A-16 Sport Falcon

General information
- Type: Light-sport aircraft
- National origin: United States
- Manufacturer: Aviadesign
- Status: Production completed
- Number built: 2

History
- Introduction date: 2007
- First flight: 2006

The Aviadesign A-16 Sport Falcon is an American light-sport aircraft that was designed by Aviadesign, a certified aircraft modification company based in Camarillo, California. The A-16 was announced at Sun 'n Fun April 2006 and introduced at the LSA Expo held in Sebring, Florida in 2007. The aircraft was to be supplied as a complete ready-to-fly-aircraft.

Jane's Information Group reports that two prototypes were completed by 2006, but it is not clear if any other examples ever flew before the company went out of business.

== Design and development ==
The aircraft was designed to comply with the US light-sport aircraft rules. It features a strut-braced high-wing, a two-seats-in-tandem enclosed cockpit under a bubble canopy, fixed tricycle landing gear and a single engine in pusher configuration.

The aircraft is made with a welded steel tubing airframe. Its 29 ft (8.8 m) span wing employs a single strut per side. The standard engine for production examples was intended to be the 100 hp (75 kW) Rotax 912ULS four-stroke powerplant. Entry to the cockpit is via an airstair door.

The design is listed on the Federal Aviation Administration's list of accepted SLSAs, but as no longer in production.

== Operational history ==
In March 2010 reviewer Dan Johnson reported on a test flight in the prototype:

the interior is spacious and comfortable, more so than many other LSAs; handling is predictable with no bad traits I could uncover; the airplane is well equipped and expects to have a price somewhere in the $110,000 range, though this decision is still being reviewed; visibility is enormous, with the pilot sitting about 4 feet in front of the wing; even the aft seat has good room, very good visibility, and full controls — it turns out my smoothest landings were from the rear.

== Specifications (A-16) ==
Data from Bayerl

General characteristics

- Crew: one
- Capacity: one passenger
- Length: 27 ft (8.2 m)
- Wingspan: 28 ft 10 in (8.8 m)
- Wing area: 130 sq ft (12 m^{2})
- Empty weight: 739 lb (335 kg)
- Gross weight: 1,232 lb (559 kg)
- Fuel capacity: 80 litres (18 imp gal; 21 US gal)
- Powerplant: 1 × Rotax 912ULS four cylinder, liquid and air-cooled, four stroke aircraft engine, 101 hp (75 kW)
- Propellers: 3-bladed Prince Aircraft composite

Performance

- Maximum speed: 140 mph (220 km/h, 120 kn)
- Cruise speed: 121 mph (195 km/h, 105 kn)
- Stall speed: 45 mph (72 km/h, 39 kn)
- Range: 450 mi (720 km, 390 nmi)
- g limits: +4/-2
- Rate of climb: 980 ft/min (5 m/s)
- Wing loading: 9.55 lb/sq ft (46.6 kg/m^{2})
