= Elk Creek Township, North Dakota =

- Township
- Location within North Dakota
- Coordinates: 47°06′36″N 103°51′28″W
- Country: United States
- State: North Dakota
- County: Golden Valley

Area
  - Total: 35.73 sq mi (92.54 km^{2})
  - Land: 35.66 sq mi (92.36 km^{2})
  - Water: 0.026 sq mi (0.067 km^{2})
- Elevation: 2,622 ft (799 m)

Population (2020)
  - Total: 6
  - Density: 0.17/sq mi (0.065/km^{2})
- Time zone: UTC-7 (Mountain (MST))
  - Summer (DST): UTC-6 (MDT)
- Area code: 701
- FIPS code: 38-23100
- GNIS feature ID: 1759433

Elk Creek Township is a township in Golden Valley County, North Dakota, United States. The population was 6 at the 2020 census.

== Geography ==
Elk Creek Township has a total area of 35.729 square miles (92.54 km^{2}), of which 35.662 square miles (92.36 km^{2}) is land and 0.067 square miles (0.17 km^{2}) is water.

== Demographics ==
As of the 2023 American Community Survey, there were an estimated 0 households.
