= Golva, North Dakota =

- City
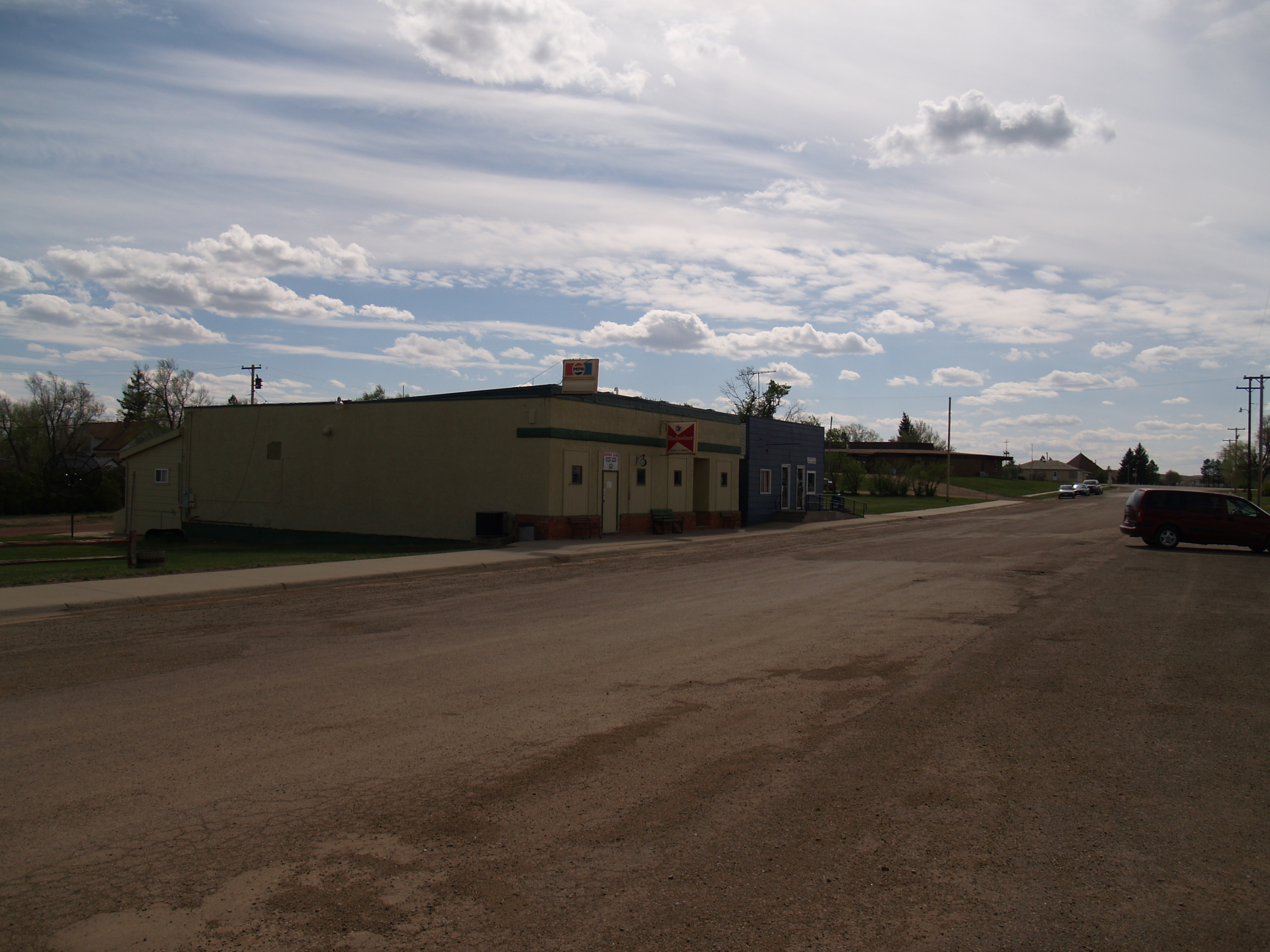
- The Golva Bar and the Golva post office

- Location of Golva, North Dakota
- Coordinates: 46°44′6″N 103°59′10″W
- Country: United States
- State: North Dakota
- County: Golden Valley
- Founded: 1915

Area
  - Total: 0.32 sq mi (0.83 km^{2})
  - Land: 0.32 sq mi (0.83 km^{2})
  - Water: 0 sq mi (0.00 km^{2})
- Elevation: 2,831 ft (863 m)

Population (2020)
  - Total: 84
  - Estimate (2022): 85
  - Density: 262.5/sq mi (101.35/km^{2})
- Time zone: UTC-7 (Mountain (MST))
  - Summer (DST): UTC-6 (MDT)
- ZIP code: 58632
- Area code: 701
- FIPS code: 38-31420
- GNIS feature ID: 1034887
- Website: golvanorthdakota.com

Golva is a city in Golden Valley County, North Dakota, United States. The population was 84 at the 2020 census. Golva was founded in 1915.

== History ==
Golva is surrounded by Lone Tree Township. The homesteaders that arrived in the area between 1900 and 1910 found only one tree in the area. That tree was standing about one mile (1.6 km) east of modern-day Golva till it died around 1980. According to the Homestead Act, the homesteaders got 160 acres (0.65 km^{2}) if they lived on the land for 7 years. In western North Dakota, they were also given another 160 acres (0.65 km^{2}) if they planted trees on the land, so there are now trees around most farmsteads in the area. The last living homesteader from the Golva area, Mrs. George (Emma) Geary, died in 1978, still owning her homestead and the house on it, although she had left the homestead in 1958 after breaking her hip. The doctors told her, due to the seriousness of the break, she would be bedridden for the rest of her life. Being a true pioneer, she responded "The hell I will". She walked with one crutch and lived alone until shortly before her death at 89. Her neighbor for over 40 years, Eva Weinreis, wrote an autobiography entitled A Note On the Tea Kettle about her life and coming from Aberdeen, South Dakota in 1906 with her husband, Peter Weinreis, to homestead two miles (3 km) west of Burkey, North Dakota and two miles (3 km) south of modern-day Golva. The book told of the early history of the Golva area.

Golva was founded in 1915, when the Northern Pacific Railroad line came down from Beach, North Dakota. It was originally supposed to be the county seat of Golden Valley County and got the name Golva from the first three letters of Golden and first two letters of Valley, the name having been suggested by the original townsite owner, A.L. Martin. The "Golden Valley" name comes from the rolling valleys of golden wheat just before harvest. Prior to 1915, most of the local businesses were in Burkey, situated about four miles (6 km) southwest of Golva. St Mary's Catholic Church was built in Burkey in 1906, but moved to Golva shortly after it was founded. The Golva post office was established February 15, 1916. Other businesses moved from Burkey to Golva and Burkey literally disappeared within a couple of years.

Golva once had a business community which consisted of a hardware store, a grocery store, a car dealership, a lumberyard, two grain elevators, two bars, a few restaurants, and several other businesses. As of 2017, the businesses in the city were a lumberyard, a gas station, a grocery store, a bank and a grain elevator. Services consisted of the post office, and the St. Mary's Catholic church.

== Geography ==
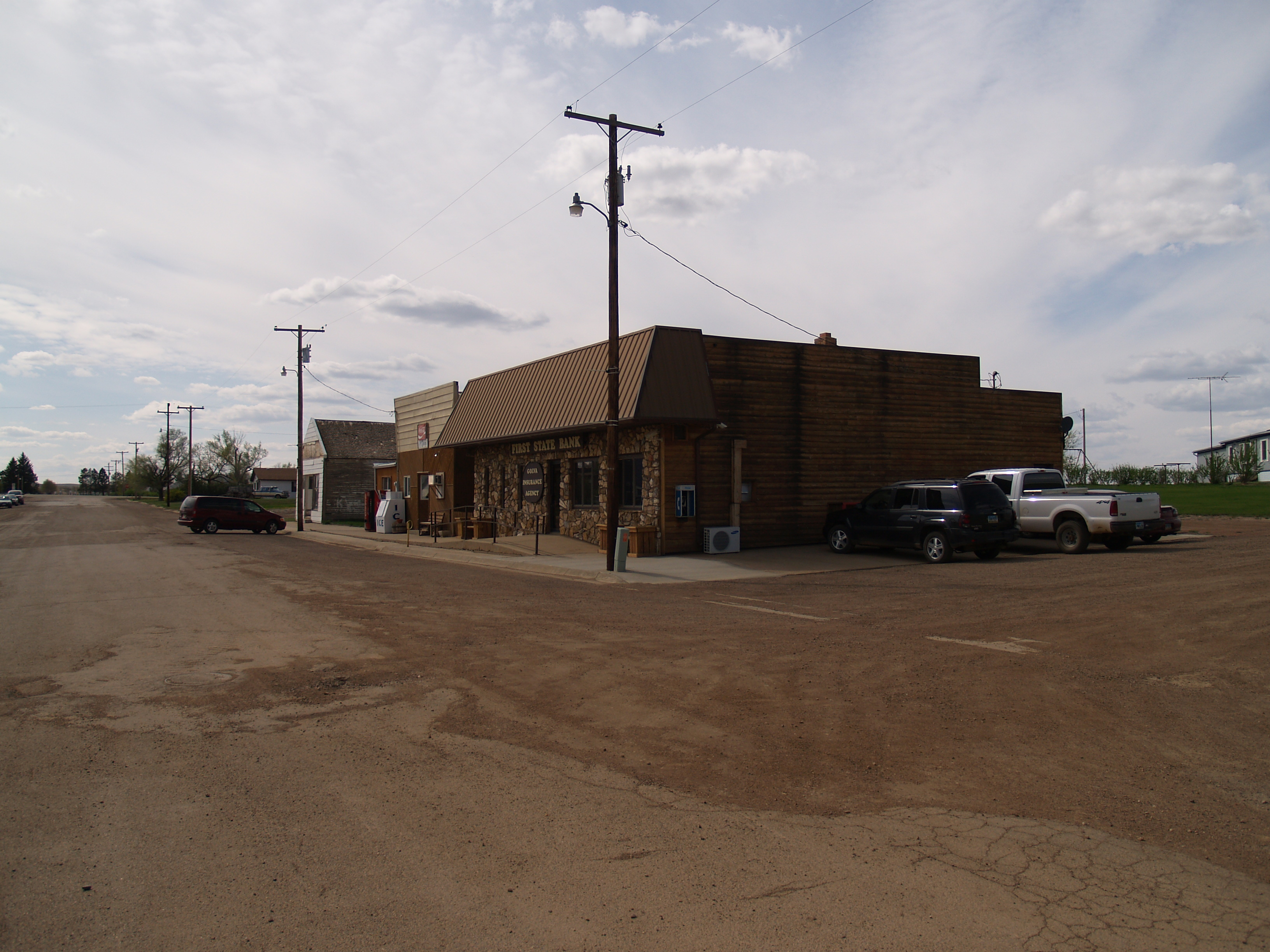
First State Bank in Golva

Golva is located at 46°44′6″N 103°59′10″W (46.735099, -103.986172).

According to the United States Census Bureau, the city has a total area of 0.33 square miles (0.85 km^{2}), all land.

== Demographics ==
Historical population
Census	Pop.	Note	%±
1950	174		—
1960	162		−6.9%
1970	104		−35.8%
1980	101		−2.9%
1990	101		0.0%
2000	106		5.0%
2010	61		−42.5%
2020	84		37.7%
2022 (est.)	85		1.2%
U.S. Decennial Census; 2020 Census

=== 2010 census ===
As of the census of 2010, there were 61 people, 37 households, and 13 families residing in the city. The population density was 184.8 inhabitants per square mile (71.4/km^{2}). There were 52 housing units at an average density of 157.6 per square mile (60.8/km^{2}). The racial makeup of the city was 100.0% White.

There were 37 households, of which 21.6% had children under the age of 18 living with them, 29.7% were married couples living together, 5.4% had a male householder with no wife present, and 64.9% were non-families. 62.2% of all households were made up of individuals, and 21.6% had someone living alone who was 65 years of age or older. The average household size was 1.65 and the average family size was 2.77.

The median age in the city was 51.2 years. 18% of residents were under the age of 18; 3.2% were between the ages of 18 and 24; 9.8% were from 25 to 44; 47.5% were from 45 to 64; and 21.3% were 65 years of age or older. The gender makeup of the city was 45.9% male and 54.1% female.

=== 2000 census ===
As of the census of 2000, there were 106 people, 46 households, and 28 families residing in the city. The population density was 314.8 inhabitants per square mile (121.5/km^{2}). There were 71 housing units at an average density of 210.9 per square mile (81.4/km^{2}). The racial makeup of the city was 98.11% White, and 1.89% from two or more races.

There were 46 households, out of which 30.4% had children under the age of 18 living with them, 56.5% were married couples living together, 2.2% had a female householder with no husband present, and 39.1% were non-families. 37.0% of all households were made up of individuals, and 13.0% had someone living alone who was 65 years of age or older. The average household size was 2.30 and the average family size was 3.07.

In the city, the population was spread out, with 29.2% under the age of 18, 1.9% from 18 to 24, 27.4% from 25 to 44, 29.2% from 45 to 64, and 12.3% who were 65 years of age or older. The median age was 39 years. For every 100 females, there were 89.3 males. For every 100 females age 18 and over, there were 102.7 males.

The median income for a household in the city was $30,000, and the median income for a family was $48,750. Males had a median income of $25,357 versus $23,125 for females. The per capita income for the city was $18,081. There were 8.7% of families and 11.8% of the population living below the poverty line, including no under eighteens and 33.3% of those over 64.

== Education ==
Golva High School and Golva Elementary School were in the same building from 1920 until 1972, when a new elementary school was built next to the high school. In 1989, the high school was closed and eventually torn down due to low enrollment and the cost of updating the building to new building codes. K-8 still attend Golva Elementary School, but the high school students go to school in Beach, North Dakota.

== Climate ==
According to the Köppen Climate Classification system, Golva has a semi-arid climate, abbreviated "BSk" on climate maps.
