= North Dakota Highway 16 =

Highway in North Dakota

North Dakota Highway 16
- ND 16 highlighted in red

Route information
- Maintained by NDDOT
- Length: 77.915 mi (125.392 km)
- Existed: 1927–present

Major junctions
- South end: End of state maintenance south of Golva
- I-94 in Beach
- North end: ND 68 southeast of Alexander

Location
- Country: United States
- State: North Dakota
- Counties: Golden Valley, McKenzie

Highway system
- North Dakota State Highway System; Interstate; US; State
| ← ND 15 | → ND 17 |

North Dakota Highway 16 (ND 16) is a 77.915-mile-long (125.392 km) north–south state highway in the U.S. state of North Dakota. ND 16's southern terminus is at the end of state maintenance south of Golva, and the northern terminus is at ND 68 southeast of Alexander.

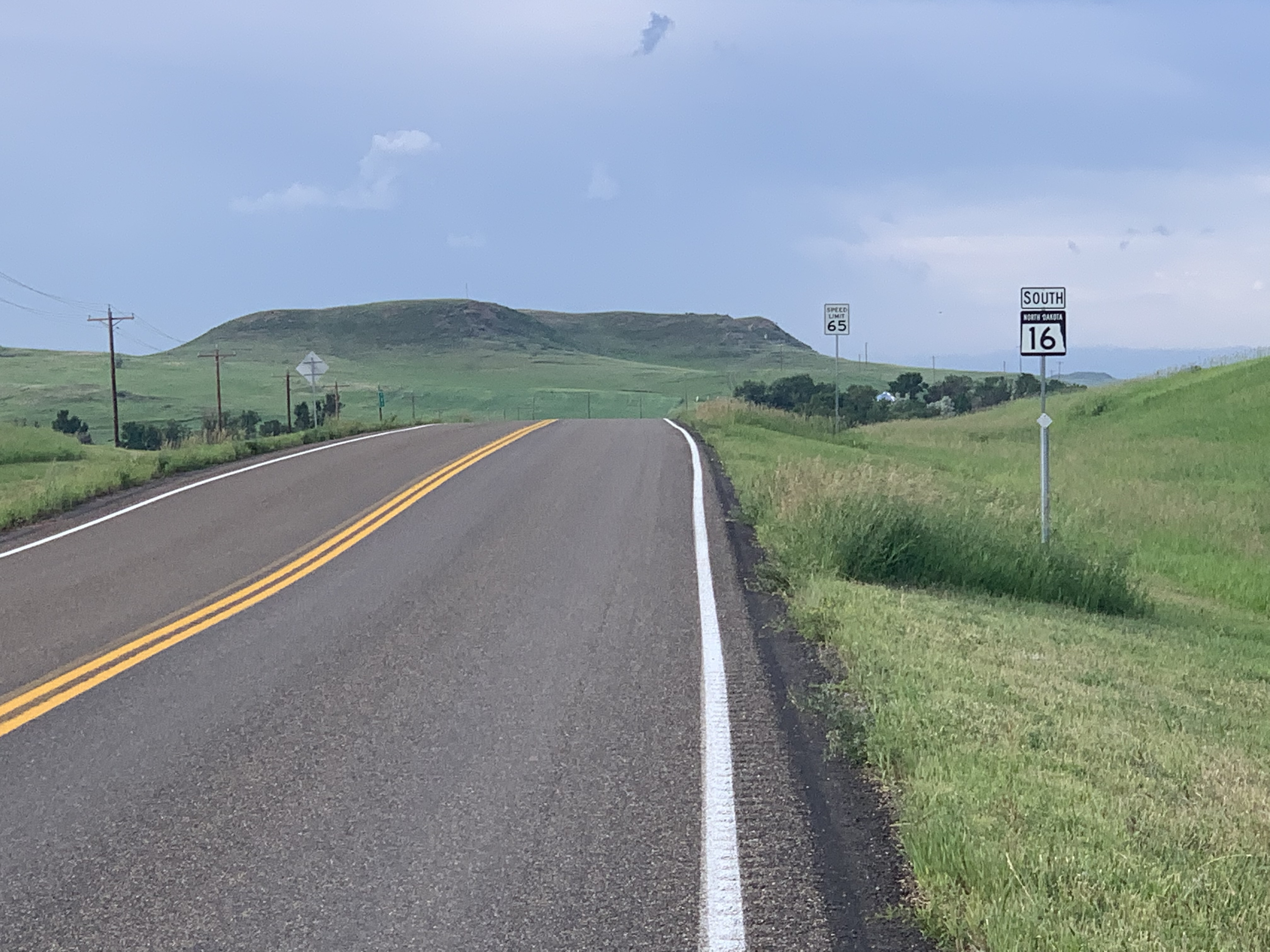
North Dakota Highway 16 in McKenzie County

== Major intersections ==
| County | Location | mi | km | Destinations | Notes |
|---|---|---|---|---|---|
| Golden Valley | | 0.000 | 0.000 | End of state maintenance | Southern terminus |
| Golden Valley | Beach | 16.887 | 27.177 | I-94 | I-94 exit 1 |
| McKenzie | | 77.915 | 125.392 | ND 68 | Northern terminus |
1.000 mi = 1.609 km; 1.000 km = 0.621 mi
