= Sentinel Butte, North Dakota =

- City
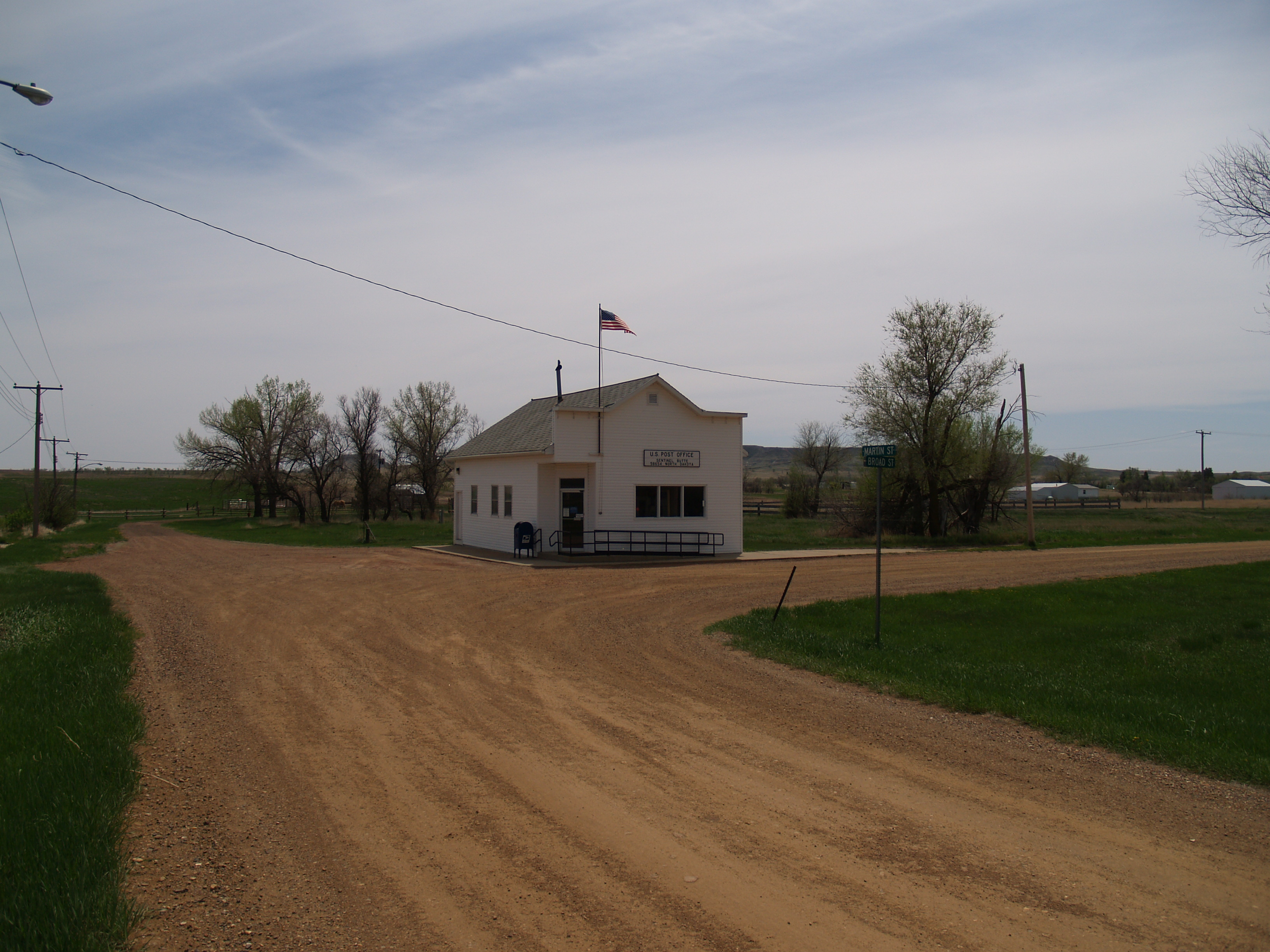
- Sentinel Butte post office

- Location of Sentinel Butte, North Dakota
- Coordinates: 46.91944°N 103.84059°W
- Country: United States
- State: North Dakota
- County: Golden Valley
- Founded: 1902

Area
  - Total: 1.046 sq mi (2.709 km^{2})
  - Land: 1.031 sq mi (2.669 km^{2})
  - Water: 0.016 sq mi (0.042 km^{2})
- Elevation: 2,720 ft (829 m)

Population (2020)
  - Total: 61
  - Estimate (2024): 70
  - Density: 59.2/sq mi (22.86/km^{2})
- Time zone: UTC–7 (Mountain (MST))
  - Summer (DST): UTC–6 (MDT)
- ZIP Code: 58654
- Area code: 701
- FIPS code: 38-71780
- GNIS feature ID: 1032020

Sentinel Butte is a city in Golden Valley County, North Dakota, United States. The population was 61 at the 2020 census, and was estimated at 70 in 2024.

== History ==
Sentinel Butte was founded in 1902 along the transcontinental rail line of the Northern Pacific Railway. The name comes from the prominent butte (3,428 ft [1,045 m]) three miles (5 km) to the south. This geographical feature was named in honor of two Arikara sentinels killed nearby in 1864 by the Sioux.

== Geography ==
According to the United States Census Bureau, the city has a total area of 1.046 square miles (2.71 km^{2}), of which 1.030 square miles (2.67 km^{2}) is land and 0.016 square miles (0.04 km^{2}) (1.53%) is water.

== Climate ==
According to the Köppen Climate Classification system, Sentinel Butte has a semi-arid climate, abbreviated "BSk" on climate maps.

== Demographics ==
Historical population
| Census | Pop. | Note | %± |
|---|---|---|---|
| 1920 | 292 | | — |
| 1930 | 219 | | −25.0% |
| 1940 | 256 | | 16.9% |
| 1950 | 229 | | −10.5% |
| 1960 | 160 | | −30.1% |
| 1970 | 125 | | −21.9% |
| 1980 | 86 | | −31.2% |
| 1990 | 79 | | −8.1% |
| 2000 | 62 | | −21.5% |
| 2010 | 56 | | −9.7% |
| 2020 | 61 | | 8.9% |
| 2024 (est.) | 70 | | 14.8% |
U.S. Decennial Census; 2020 Census

=== 2010 census ===
As of the 2010 census, there were 56 people, 30 households, and 17 families residing in the city. The population density was 53.8 inhabitants per square mile (20.8/km^{2}). There were 38 housing units at an average density of 36.5 per square mile (14.1/km^{2}). The racial makeup of the city was 100.0% White.

There were 30 households, of which 6.7% had children under the age of 18 living with them, 50.0% were married couples living together, 6.7% had a female householder with no husband present, and 43.3% were non-families. 40.0% of all households were made up of individuals, and 20% had someone living alone who was 65 years of age or older. The average household size was 1.87 and the average family size was 2.47.

The median age in the city was 56.8 years. 5.4% of residents were under the age of 18; 5.4% were between the ages of 18 and 24; 16.1% were from 25 to 44; 39.3% were from 45 to 64; and 33.9% were 65 years of age or older. The gender makeup of the city was 51.8% male and 48.2% female.

=== 2000 census ===
As of the 2000 census, there were 62 people, 30 households, and 18 families residing in the city. The population density was 55.3 inhabitants per square mile (21.4/km^{2}). There were 44 housing units at an average density of 39.2 per square mile (15.1/km^{2}). The racial makeup of the city was 100.00% White.

There were 30 households, out of which 20.0% had children under the age of 18 living with them, 56.7% were married couples living together, 3.3% had a female householder with no husband present, and 40.0% were non-families. 40.0% of all households were made up of individuals, and 23.3% had someone living alone who was 65 years of age or older. The average household size was 2.07 and the average family size was 2.72.

In the city, the population was spread out, with 19.4% under the age of 18, 3.2% from 18 to 24, 16.1% from 25 to 44, 27.4% from 45 to 64, and 33.9% who were 65 years of age or older. The median age was 50 years. For every 100 females, there were 100.0 males. For every 100 females age 18 and over, there were 100.0 males.

The median income for a household in the city was $21,563, and the median income for a family was $33,750. Males and females had a median income of $21,250. The per capita income for the city was $13,584. There were 16.7% of families and 18.2% of the population living below the poverty line, including no under eighteens and 26.7% of those over 64.
