= Beach, North Dakota =

- City
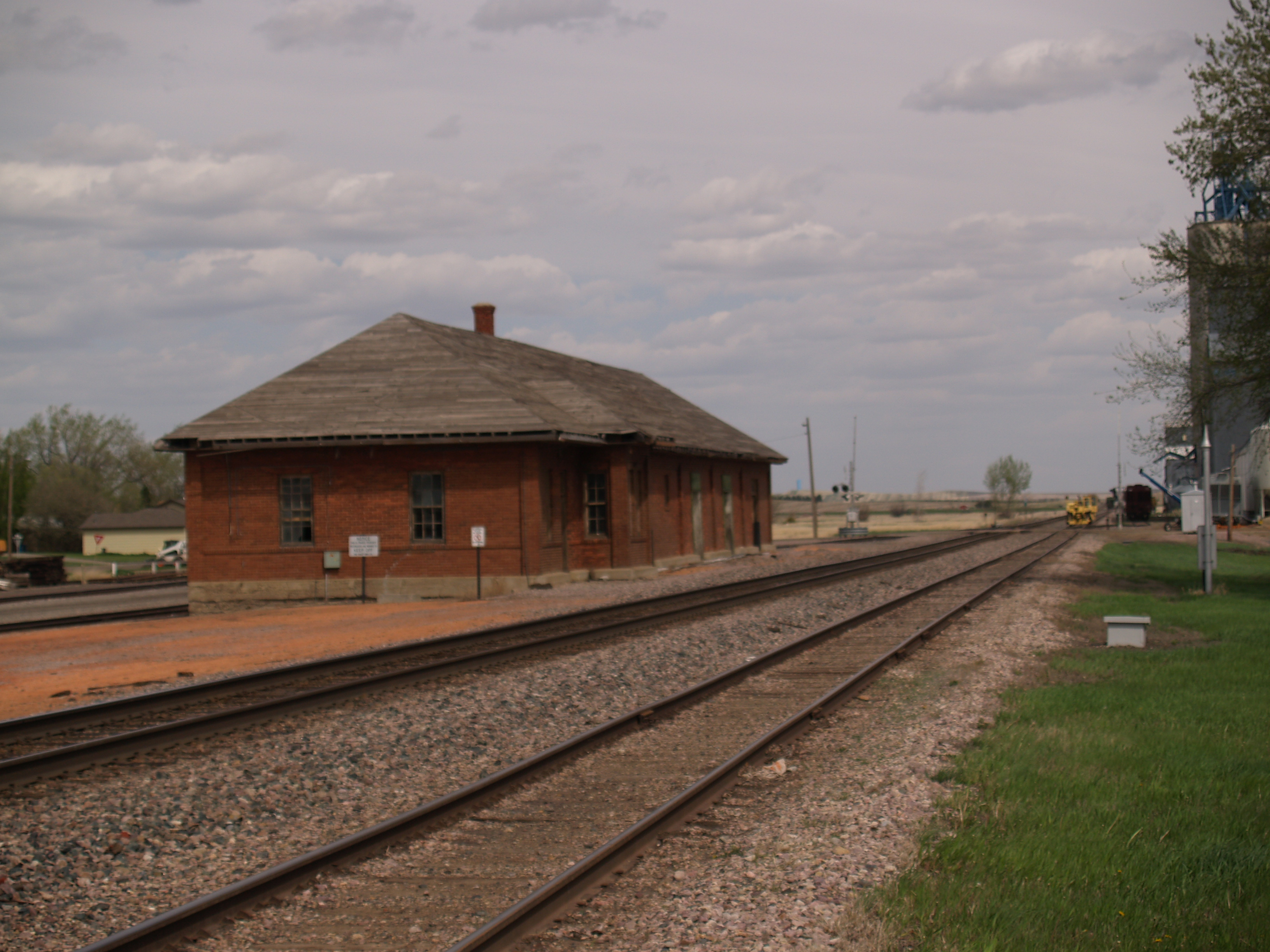
- Beach train station

- Seal

- Location of Beach, North Dakota
- Coordinates: 46°54′57″N 104°00′16″W
- Country: United States
- State: North Dakota
- County: Golden Valley
- Settled: 1900
- Incorporated (village): 1908
- Incorporated (city): 1909
- Named for: Capt. Warren C. Beach

Government
  - Mayor: Walter Losinski

Area
  - Total: 2.574 sq mi (6.667 km^{2})
  - Land: 2.552 sq mi (6.610 km^{2})
  - Water: 0.022 sq mi (0.058 km^{2})
- Elevation: 2,772 ft (845 m)

Population (2020)
  - Total: 981
  - Estimate (2024): 993
  - Density: 384/sq mi (148.4/km^{2})
- Time zone: UTC–7 (Mountain (MST))
  - Summer (DST): UTC–6 (MDT)
- ZIP Code: 58621
- Area code: 701
- FIPS code: 38-05420
- GNIS feature ID: 1027837
- Highways: I-94, ND 16
- Website: beachnd.com

Beach is a city in and the county seat of Golden Valley County in the State of North Dakota. The population was 981 at the 2020 census and was estimated to be 993 in 2024. Beach was incorporated in 1909. Walter Losinski was elected mayor of Beach in June 2022. Beach is approximately 1 mile away from Montana.

== History ==
Beach was first settled circa 1900. It was named for Captain Warren C. Beach of the U.S. Army's 11th Infantry Regiment. Beach had led an expedition of railroad surveyors through the area in 1880. The post office was established in 1902, and the town was incorporated first as a village in 1908 and as a city in 1909. It was named the county seat of Golden Valley County in 1912.

In April 1911, the then ex-president and long-term fixture of the Badlands region, Theodore Roosevelt, made his last trip to the area, stopping in Beach and nearby Medora. His visit to Medora passed without incident, but the visit to Beach was marred by a strongly negative reception to Roosevelt's speech. He first expressed surprise that the town of Beach even existed, based upon such marginal land. This was undoubtedly due to the lack of flora and fauna, the wear and strain he endured in the 10 years he ranched in the area, and Rocky Mountain and Great Plains blizzard of 1886–7. Roosevelt's speech had a strong conservationist element, suggesting to local ranchers there should only be one cow for every 12 acres (49,000 m^{2}) of land, which led to local disenchantment with the president.

The incident is likely to have critically influenced his commentary and estrangement with the region, culminating in October 1918. While giving a morale speech regarding World War I in then strongly anti-war North Dakota, a side trip to the Badlands was suggested. Roosevelt demurred, stating "[i]t is a mistake for one to hit the back trail after many years have passed. One finds things have changed, the old picture destroyed, the romance gone . . . It's best that it should be so, but I don't want to see the place again. I'd rather try and remember it as it was."

== Geography ==
Beach is located in western North Dakota along the border with Montana. According to the United States Census Bureau, the city has a total area of 2.574 square miles (6.67 km^{2}), of which 2.552 square miles (6.61 km^{2}) is land and 0.022 square miles (0.06 km^{2}) is water.

== Demographics ==
Historical population
Census	Pop.	Note	%±
1910	1,003		—
1920	1,106		10.3%
1930	1,263		14.2%
1940	1,178		−6.7%
1950	1,461		24.0%
1960	1,460		−0.1%
1970	1,408		−3.6%
1980	1,381		−1.9%
1990	1,205		−12.7%
2000	1,116		−7.4%
2010	1,019		−8.7%
2020	981		−3.7%
2024 (est.)	993		1.2%
U.S. Decennial Census; 2020 Census

=== 2010 census ===
As of the 2010 census, there were 1,019 people, 498 households, and 251 families living in the city. The population density was 528.0 inhabitants per square mile (203.9/km^{2}). There were 601 housing units at an average density of 311.4 per square mile (120.2/km^{2}). The racial makeup of the city was 97.4% White, 0.6% African American, 0.4% Native American, 0.1% Asian, 0.1% Pacific Islander, 0.7% from other races, and 0.7% from two or more races. Hispanic or Latino of any race were 2.2% of the population.

There were 498 households, of which 23.1% had children under the age of 18 living with them, 42.6% were married couples living together, 5.2% had a female householder with no husband present, 2.6% had a male householder with no wife present, and 49.6% were non-families. 43.8% of all households were made up of individuals, and 22.9% had someone living alone who was 65 years of age or older. The average household size was 2.05 and the average family size was 2.90.

The median age in the city was 46.2 years. 22.5% of residents were under the age of 18; 5.4% were between the ages of 18 and 24; 20% were from 25 to 44; 29.2% were from 45 to 64; and 23% were 65 years of age or older. The gender makeup of the city was 47.3% male and 52.7% female.

=== 2000 census ===
As of the 2000 census, there were 1,116 people, 470 households, and 292 families living in the city. The population density was 610.3 inhabitants per square mile (235.6/km^{2}). There were 570 housing units at an average density of 311.7 per square mile (120.3/km^{2}). The racial makeup of the city was 98.66% White, 0.18% Native American, 0.18% Asian, 0.54% from other races, and 0.45% from two or more races. Hispanic or Latino of any race were 0.99% of the population.

There were 470 households, out of which 28.3% had children under the age of 18 living with them, 51.7% were married couples living together, 7.0% had a female householder with no husband present, and 37.7% were non-families. 36.0% of all households were made up of individuals, and 19.1% had someone living alone who was 65 years of age or older. The average household size was 2.29 and the average family size was 3.00.

In the city, the population was spread out, with 25.4% under the age of 18, 5.4% from 18 to 24, 22.0% from 25 to 44, 21.6% from 45 to 64, and 25.6% who were 65 years of age or older. The median age was 43 years. For every 100 females, there were 80.6 males. For every 100 females age 18 and over, there were 76.3 males.

The median income for a household in the city was $28,977, and the median income for a family was $35,536. Males had a median income of $25,515 versus $17,857 for females. The per capita income for the city was $14,450. About 10.9% of families and 17.6% of the population were below the poverty line, including 31.6% of those under age 18 and 7.2% of those age 65 or over.

== Notable people ==
- Vern Oech, offensive guard for the Chicago Bears (1936–1937)
- A. C. Townley, farmer, political organizer, founder of the Non-Partisan League

== Climate ==
According to the Köppen Climate Classification system, Beach has a borderline humid continental climate, abbreviated Dfb on climate maps, and it closely borders upon a cool semi-arid climate, abbreviated BSk.

Climate data for Beach, North Dakota, 1991–2020 normals, extremes 1906–2011
Month	Jan	Feb	Mar	Apr	May	Jun	Jul	Aug	Sep	Oct	Nov	Dec	Year
Record high °F (°C)	61 (16)	68 (20)	84 (29)	93 (34)	99 (37)	106 (41)	110 (43)	108 (42)	102 (39)	93 (34)	79 (26)	67 (19)	110 (43)
Mean maximum °F (°C)	48.5 (9.2)	52.8 (11.6)	67.0 (19.4)	77.6 (25.3)	85.4 (29.7)	92.2 (33.4)	97.5 (36.4)	96.2 (35.7)	92.6 (33.7)	79.5 (26.4)	64.1 (17.8)	49.0 (9.4)	99.7 (37.6)
Mean daily maximum °F (°C)	27.3 (−2.6)	31.0 (−0.6)	43.1 (6.2)	56.3 (13.5)	67.4 (19.7)	76.5 (24.7)	84.6 (29.2)	85.0 (29.4)	73.9 (23.3)	56.5 (13.6)	40.9 (4.9)	30.2 (−1.0)	56.1 (13.4)
Daily mean °F (°C)	16.8 (−8.4)	20.7 (−6.3)	31.7 (−0.2)	43.0 (6.1)	54.0 (12.2)	63.5 (17.5)	70.1 (21.2)	69.5 (20.8)	59.4 (15.2)	44.4 (6.9)	30.6 (−0.8)	20.3 (−6.5)	43.7 (6.5)
Mean daily minimum °F (°C)	6.2 (−14.3)	10.4 (−12.0)	20.3 (−6.5)	29.7 (−1.3)	40.5 (4.7)	50.5 (10.3)	55.6 (13.1)	53.9 (12.2)	44.9 (7.2)	32.3 (0.2)	20.3 (−6.5)	10.4 (−12.0)	31.3 (−0.4)
Mean minimum °F (°C)	−18.3 (−27.9)	−12.9 (−24.9)	−3.4 (−19.7)	12.8 (−10.7)	25.7 (−3.5)	38.0 (3.3)	45.3 (7.4)	40.5 (4.7)	28.3 (−2.1)	12.7 (−10.7)	−1.1 (−18.4)	−17.3 (−27.4)	−26.5 (−32.5)
Record low °F (°C)	−40 (−40)	−43 (−42)	−40 (−40)	−8 (−22)	10 (−12)	26 (−3)	32 (0)	29 (−2)	11 (−12)	−15 (−26)	−20 (−29)	−38 (−39)	−43 (−42)
Average precipitation inches (mm)	0.53 (13)	0.50 (13)	0.79 (20)	1.70 (43)	2.36 (60)	2.50 (64)	2.47 (63)	1.56 (40)	1.81 (46)	1.27 (32)	0.49 (12)	0.52 (13)	16.5 (419)
Average snowfall inches (cm)	5.0 (13)	5.5 (14)	5.2 (13)	4.1 (10)	1.9 (4.8)	0.0 (0.0)	0.0 (0.0)	0.0 (0.0)	0.1 (0.25)	2.5 (6.4)	3.3 (8.4)	5.2 (13)	32.8 (82.85)
Average precipitation days (≥ 0.01 in)	3.9	3.5	4.4	5.4	8.3	9.1	7.1	4.9	4.9	4.5	3.4	3.8	63.2
Average snowy days (≥ 0.1 in)	3.1	3.3	2.8	1.6	0.6	0.0	0.0	0.0	0.2	0.7	2.1	3.4	17.8
Source: NOAA (mean maxima/minima, snow/snow days 1981–2010)
